= Godspeed You! Black Emperor discography =

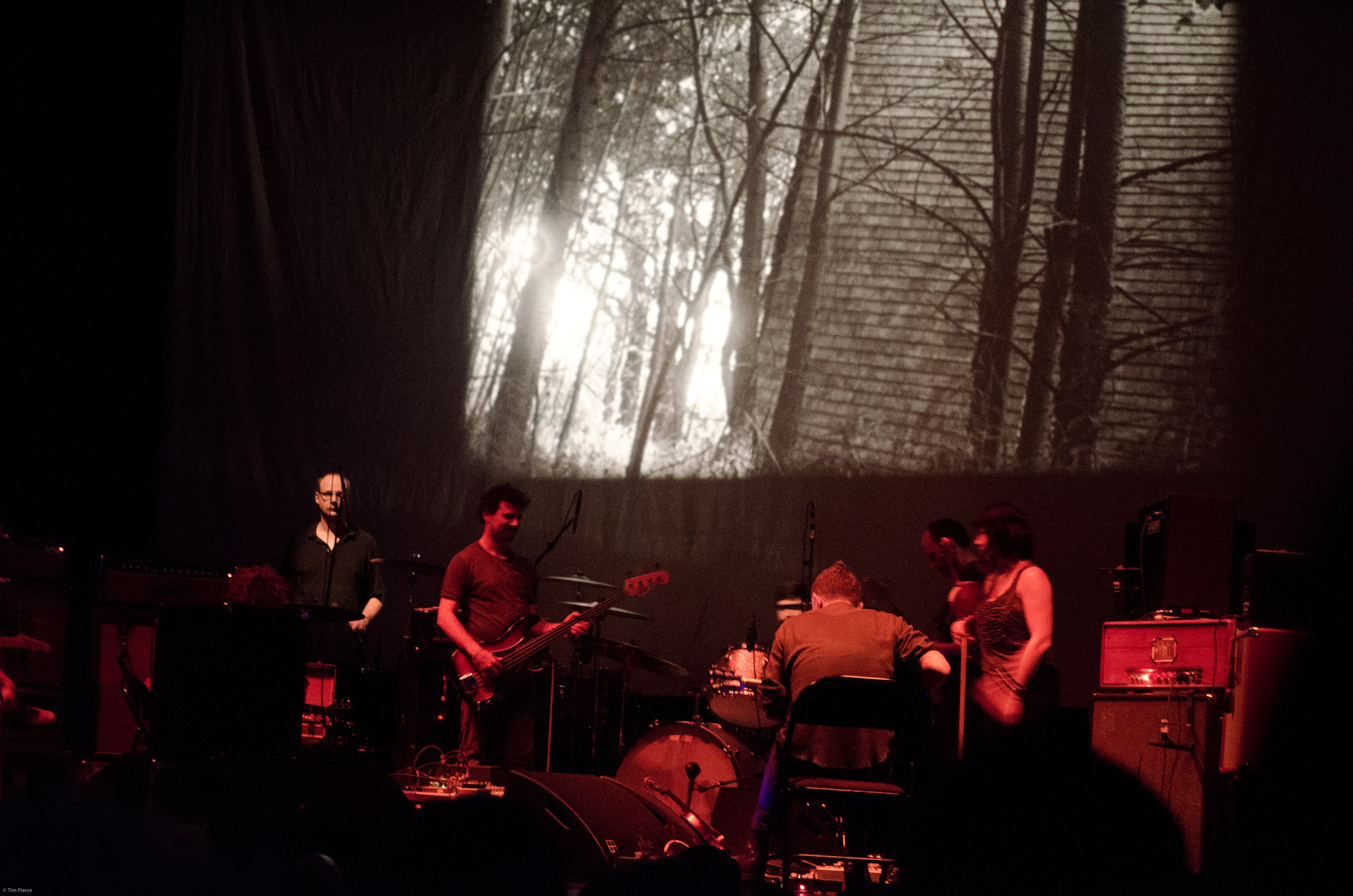
- Studio albums: 8
- Extended plays: 1
- Singles: 5
- Various artist compilations: 2

The discography of Godspeed You! Black Emperor—a Canadian post-rock musical collective from Quebec—consists of eight studio albums, one extended play, one split single, and two contributions to various artists compilation albums.

== Albums ==
=== Studio albums ===
Title	Album details	Peak chart positions								
Title	Album details	BEL Fl.	BEL Wa.	FIN	GER	NLD	SPA	SWI	UK	US
F♯ A♯ ∞	Released: 14 August 1997 (vinyl), 8 June 1998 (CD); Label: Constellation/Kranky	—	—	—	—	—	—	—	—	—
Lift Your Skinny Fists like Antennas to Heaven	Released: 9 October 2000; Label: Constellation/Kranky	—	—	—	—	—	—	—	66	—
Yanqui U.X.O.	Released: 4 November 2002; Label: Constellation	—	—	—	—	—	—	—	92	—
'Allelujah! Don't Bend! Ascend!	Released: 1 October 2012; Label: Constellation	49	118	47	—	95	—	94	41	45
Asunder, Sweet and Other Distress	Released: 31 March 2015; Label: Constellation	62	125	—	—	—	—	—	37	129
Luciferian Towers	Released: 22 September 2017; Label: Constellation	58	131	—	100	—	—	—	34	—
G_d's Pee at State's End!	Released: 2 April 2021; Label: Constellation	28	133	—	11	82	75	21	29	—
No Title as of 13 February 2024 28,340 Dead	Released: 4 October 2024; Label: Constellation	79	—	—	81	—	—	—	97	—

=== Demos ===
Title	Album details
All Lights Fucked on the Hairy Amp Drooling	Released on cassette: December 1994; Re-released digitally: February 14, 2022

== Extended plays ==
Title	EP details
Slow Riot for New Zero Kanada	Released: 8 March 1999; Label: Constellation

== Singles ==
Title	Year	Label	Album
"Sunshine + Gasoline"	1998	aMAZEzine!	Lost in the House, split single with Fly Pan Am included with the magazine aMAZEzine!.
"We Drift Like Worried Fire"	2015	Joyful Noise Recordings	'Allelujah! Don't Bend! Ascend!, 50 Bands & a Cat for Indiana Equality series on Joyful Noise Recordings.
"Undoing a Luciferian Towers"	2017	Constellation Records	Luciferian Towers
"Anthem for No State, Pt. III"	2017	Constellation Records	Luciferian Towers
"Grey Rubble – Green Shoots"	2024	Constellation Records	No Title as of 13 February 2024 28,340 Dead

== Various artist compilations ==
Title	Year	Track(s)	Notes
Azadi!	2003	"George Bush Cut Up While Talking"	Released by Fire Museum Records on Compact Disc. This track is a part of the track "motherfucker=redeemer" part II on the vinyl edition of Yanqui U.X.O.
Song of the Silent Land	2004	"Outro"	Released by Constellation Records on Compact Disc. This track is a live performance in Nantes of the ending to the F♯A♯∞ song "The Dead Flag Blues"

== Other songs ==
On 22 November 1998, the band recorded the song "Hung Over as the Queen in the Maida Vale" for a John Peel session; it was made up of the movements "Monheim", "Chart #3", and "Steve Reich". It was first transmitted on 19 January 1999. Later in 1999, the band recorded a radio session for VPRO which included "She Dreamt She Was a Bulldozer", "Steve Reich", "World Police and Friendly Fire", and "Moya".

== Related projects ==
David Bryant, Bruce Cawdron, Aidan Girt, Mike Moya, Thea Pratt, Roger Tellier-Craig, and Sophie Trudeau

- Set Fire to Flames

Thierry Amar, Efrim Menuck, and Sophie Trudeau

- Thee Silver Mt. Zion Memorial Orchestra & Tra-La-La Band

Thierry Amar, Norsola Johnson, and Mike Moya

- Molasses

Thierry Amar and Efrim Menuck

- Vic Chesnutt (production and playing on North Star Deserter and At the Cut)
- Hannah Marcus (performers on Desert Farmers, tracks 2–5, 8, 9; Efrim – vocals on track 2)

Roger Tellier-Craig and Sophie Trudeau

- Et Sans

Mike Moya and Sophie Trudeau

- HṚṢṬA

Thierry Amar

- Balai Mécanique
- Black Ox Orkestar
- Land of Kush (bass guitar)
- Because of Ghosts (double bass, cello)

David Bryant

- Bliss
- Hiss Tracts

Bruce Cawdron

- Esmerine
- Triple Burner

Aidan Girt

- 1-Speed Bike (also known as Bottleskup Flenkenkenmike)
- Bottleskup Flenkenkenmike
- Exhaust
- Bakunin's Bum
- The Trapt
- Please Don't Put Charles on the Money

Norsola Johnson

- Sixtoo & Norsola (Collaboration)
- Amon Tobin's Foley Room (Performer)
- Land of Kush (cello)

Efrim Menuck

- Hangedup (recording and mixing)
- Lesbians on Ecstasy (recording and mixing on We Know You Know)
- Simon Finn (recording on Magic Moments)

Mike Moya

- Elizabeth Anka Vajagic's live band
- Lonesome Hanks

Mauro Pezzente

- Crowface
- Mauro Pezzente & Kiva Stimac (Infrequent performances at Hotel2Tango in 1995)

Roger Tellier-Craig

- Le Révélateur
- Fly Pan Am
- Pas Chic Chic
- Shalabi Effect
- Klaxon Gueule

Sophie Trudeau

- Valley of the Giants
- Diebold
- Kiss Me Deadly
- The Mile End Ladies String Auxiliary Set

Various members

- Evangelista – Hello, Voyager (Efrim Menuck – recording, mixing, guitar, voice; Sophie Trudeau – violin, Thierry Amar – double bass)
