= East Hastings (composition) =

Composition by Godspeed You! Black Emperor

from the album F♯ A♯ ∞
- Released: June 8, 1998
- Recorded: May 1997
- Studio: Hotel2Tango
- Length: 18:00 (all parts); 1:35 ("Nothing's Alrite in Our Life..." / "The Dead Flag Blues (Reprise)"); 10:44 ("The Sad Mafioso..."); 5:41 ("Drugs in Tokyo" / "Black Helicopter")
- Label: Constellation, Kranky
- Songwriters: Efrim Menuck; Mauro Pezzente; Sophie Trudeau; Thierry Amar; David Bryant; Roger Tellier-Craig; Aidan Girt; Bruce Cawdron; Norsola Johnson
- Producers: Don Wilkie; Ian Ilavsky; Godspeed You! Black Emperor

"East Hastings" is a three-part composition by Canadian post-rock band Godspeed You! Black Emperor from the 1998 CD release of their debut studio album F♯ A♯ ∞. The song is named after East Hastings Street in Vancouver's Downtown Eastside. The composition consists of three movements: "Nothing's Alrite in Our Life..." / "The Dead Flag Blues (Reprise)", "The Sad Mafioso...", and "Drugs in Tokyo" / "Black Helicopter".

Most of the composition was featured on the original 1997 LP release of F♯ A♯ ∞: "Nothing's Alrite in Our Life..." and "The Sad Mafioso..." opened the B-side of the record, titled "Bleak, Uncertain, Beautiful...", while "Drugs in Tokyo" was from the A-side, "Nervous, Sad, Poor..."

An edited version of "The Sad Mafioso..." was used in the film 28 Days Later and its subsequent sequel, 28 Years Later. The song is also featured towards the end of the fifth episode of the show Under the Banner of Heaven. “The Sad Mafioso…” is a regular closer to their live shows, being played over 250 times since reforming in 2010 as of June 2025. As a live set closer, the piece starts with a noisy improvisation, with the band singing along to the tune after the first crescendo. As a drumroll closes out the song, the band utilizes feedback and improvisation in an extended noisy outro slowly quieting as the band members leave the stage.

== Composition ==
=== "Nothing's Alrite in Our Life..." / "The Dead Flag Blues (Reprise)" ===
The opening movement of "East Hastings" is titled "Nothing's Alrite in Our Life..." / "The Dead Flag Blues (Reprise)". It features a bagpipe reprise of the main riff from the album's opening track, "The Dead Flag Blues", and a Caribbean street preacher testifying about spiritual hunger and material wealth. The woman delivering the sermon was Imogen, who was well known to the community around East Hastings in the late 1980s and early 90s, as she would sit out the front of a Woodward's store and spread the word of God. In an interview, Efrim Menuck said that they were in Vancouver filming and recording around East Hastings when they heard Imogen testifying from around the corner and pulled out a portable audio recorder.

=== "The Sad Mafioso..." ===
The second section, "The Sad Mafioso..." begins with a slow, repeating guitar theme, slowly building as drums and strings are added. The music becomes faster and more aggressive before switching to double time, ending, and transitioning into the third and final section.

=== "Drugs in Tokyo" / "Black Helicopter" ===
A pulsating drone starts the final movement, and fades into a guitar loop, before being overtaken by a buzzing, electronic drone, which ends the song.

== Use in 28 Days Later and 28 Years Later ==
During an interview with The Guardian, director Danny Boyle of 28 Days Later and 28 Years Later explained, "I always try to have a soundtrack in my mind [when creating a film]. Like when we did Trainspotting, it was Underworld. For me, the soundtrack to 28 Days Later was Godspeed. The whole film was cut to Godspeed in my head."

The song does not appear on 28 Days Later: The Soundtrack Album because the rights to the song could not be obtained.
