= Maria Hinze =

German visual artist

- Occupation: Visual artist

Maria Hinze is a German visual artist with the main focus in painting and drawing. Born in Germany, she studied in Vienna at the Academy of Fine Arts under Walter Obholzer, in Leipzig at the Academy of Fine Arts in the class of Neo Rauch and Astrid Klein and in Düsseldorf in the class of Tal R. She has produced multimedia works and exhibited together with the light technicians Hans Leser (HAU) and Martin Schwemin (Rimini Protokoll) at Souterrain-Berlin, with filmmaker Johann Lurf and painter Florian Schmidt and other artists in the Pinacoteca Vienna. She has worked on interdisciplinary projects with Raymond Pettibon (for the art book "Dem neuen Himmel eine neue Erde"), Simon Faithfull, Taka Kagitomi and Camilla Richter and musicians such as Etkin Cekin (Istanbul), Mike Moya (Montreal) and M. Rux (Berlin).

== Life and career ==
Hinze's artistic approach touches on contemporary and historical discourses about art and architecture, which she transfers into new formats, such as at the Archiv Massiv in Leipzig, at Acud Macht Neu and Plattenpalast in Berlin, the BMW branch at Alte Messe in Leipzig or at Haus Blumenthal, Händelallee 67 in Berlin's Hansaviertel district.

She currently lives and works in Berlin (Germany) and Montreal (Canada) with her partner musician Mike Moya (Godspeed You! Black Emperor) and their family.

== Education ==
2009–2010 Studied painting, Düsseldorf Art Academy, Prof. Tal R

2005–2008 Studied painting and graphic design, Academy of Fine Arts Leipzig, Prof. Neo Rauch – Degree in Fine Art

2004–2005 Studied art, Academy of Fine Arts Leipzig, Prof. Astrid Klein

2002–2004 Studied art, Academy of Fine Arts Vienna, Prof. Walter Obholzer

2000–2002 Studied art history, Humboldt University Berlin

== Work ==
In her work, Hinze tackles the complexity of varying methods and approaches in order to question pictorial spaces and visual content. She is interested in finding independent structural and aesthetic means, via which her work can challenge the power of drawing and painting to influence the observer, the materiality of the line in contrast to the pictorial surface and the possible multidimensionality of both media. The transition between media influences the very core of her work. She examines the potential meaning of drawing and painting in the liminal zones between the drawn line and the painted surface in tangible surroundings, as she does between an artistic mind-set and a sphere of social activity. Thematically, her work deals with concepts such as presence and permeability, visibility and invisibility, and disappearance, all from the most variant perspectives. These aspects are examined as moments of motion, as moments of appearance and acts of concealment. Maria Hinze's work is concerned with the relationship between humans and their surroundings. The human body functions as a physical medium for storing both the conscious and subconscious. Hinze comprehends herself as a storage medium for images of a world of language and form, which is rooted in the subconscious and, as such, precedes her own thought structures – intangible knowledge is translated into language and tangible space. Translated by Pete Littlewood.

== Exhibitions ==
=== Solo exhibitions ===
- 2020 „Neues Leben, neue Zeit“ wall drawing, Haus Blumenthal, Hansaviertel Berlin
- 2016/17 "The sagest time to dam the sea is when the sea is gone", in dialogue with works by Camilla Richter, Florian Schmidt, Simon Faithfull, Taka Kagitomi at KVlegal, Berlin
- 2016 "Totgesagte leben länger", former Tuberculosis clinic Vogelsang near Gommern, department for pain therapy
- 2016 "Line Out Somewhere, Part II", Beach drawing with Mike Moya (Godspeed You! Black Emperor), Darßer peninsula near Ahrensoop
- 2014 "Notiz 14" with Etkin Çekin (Farfara), Mike Moya (Godspeed You! Black Emperor), Saaela Abrams, project space Acud, Berlin
- 2014 "Line Out Somewhere", beach drawing with Mike Moya (Godspeed You! Black Emperor), Darß peninsula near Ahrenshoop
- 2014 "The Great", private site "LEUCHTKRAFT" – lighting, camera, production, Berlin
- 2013 "Federding", at Mike Moya's, Montreal
- 2013 "Zeichenfinder", private collection, Prof. Carsten Wieworra, Plattenpalast, Berlin
- 2012 "Zwischen Utopie und Wirklichkeit", Haus Blumenthal, Hansaviertel, private collection, Händelallee 67, Berlin
- 2012 "Ordnung, Kraft", Meinblau e.V., Berlin
- 2011 "Broken Circle", with Falko Teichmann, Hans Leser, M. Rux, Souterrain-Berlin
- 2010 "The Mess We Made", Archiv Massiv, Baumwollspinnerei, Leipzig
- 2010 "When An Area Is Enveloped By Fog It Appears Larger More Sublime", with M. Rux/Ellenschneider, Lukas Lonski, Kiki Bohemia and Chez Mieke, Wald und Wiese alias Fog Puma, bar25, Berlin
- 2009 "Both Sides Of A Swing Door Are Swaying Open And Shut, As If Blown By A Breath Of Wind Or The After-effects Of Someone Passing Through", Plattenpalast, Berlin
- 2009 "He Persists in Silence", Enblanco project space, Berlin
- 2008 "Dem neuen Himmel eine neue Erde", Diplom Galerie Pierogie, Leipzig/Brooklyn

=== Selected group exhibitions and projects ===
- 2020 “Herzschwingen - Tension of Human Life – The Heartbeat and Myocardial Contraction“, curated by Maria Hinze, with Kimberley de Jong and Jason Sharp, Laura Fong Prosper, Nele Brönner, Aidan Girt, Gambletron, Mike Moya, Kevin Doria, Nick Kuepfer and others; Meinblau e.V. Projektraum, Pfefferberg, Berlin
- 2018 "Tokyo Morandi" curated by Maria Hinze with Sophie Trudeau, Michaela Grill, Karl Holmquist, Camilla Richter, Mauro Pezzente, Kimberley de Jong, Mike Moya, Simon Faithfull, Philippe Leonard, Johann Lurf, Gambletron and Johnny Nawracaj at Meinblau Projektraum, Pfefferberg, Berlin
- 2016 48 Stunden Neuköln, Cherie Sundays No 7 // nothing happens, with Laura Fong Prosper i.a., Berlin
- 2015 "Display", with Ayumi Rahn, Christian Otto, Johann Lurf, Karl Lemieux, Michael Part, Walter Obholzer, Pinacoteca Wien, Vienna
- 2014 "Neue Regeln", with Peder K. Bugge, Takehito Koganezawa, Arne Schreiber, curated by Anne Fäser, Isabel Holert, Felix Laubscher, Plattenpalast, Berlin
- 2014 "Paradis de la Crème", with Falko Teichmann, M. Rux, Talis and Gatis Silde, Naked Lunch, Berlin
- 2013 "Let it go", with Fiete Stolte, Kerstin Gottschalk, Melissa Steckbauer, Rainer Neumeier a.o., Souterrain-Berlin
- 2013 "Radio Osscillations", curated residency, with Gambletron and Jen Reimer, Montreal, Souterrain-Berlin
- 2013 "Transitory Rituals", curated exhibition, with Hanako Geierhos, Souterrain-Berlin
- 2013 fashion collection, "Fernzeichen" mit Lesole, Berlin
- 2012 participation in group exhibition "Timed Up and Go Test", with Florian Schmidt, Kartenrecht, Kitty Kraus, Ulf Aminde a.o., Souterrain-Berlin
- 2012 participation in group exhibition "Let it Flow let it Go", with Christian Egger, Dominique Hurth, Thomas Janitzky a.o., Souterrain-Berlin
- 2012 participation in group exhibition "Temporary Home", video performance, parallel event to Documenta, Kassel
- 2011 "Er hockte in der Zeit und konnte sie nicht an sich bringen", with Alexandra Leykauf, Eiko Grimberg, Michael Part, Norbert Witzgall a.o., Auguststr. 35, Berlin
- 2011 participation in group exhibition, "Heavy Papers", Galeri Merkur, Istanbul
- 2011 participation in group exhibition, "Offensichtlich öffentlich", curated by Peer Golo Willi, Berlin
- 2010 participation in group exhibition, Canakkale Biennale, "Fiktional, Realities, Transformations", Canakkale
- 2010 studio presentations, Akademie der Künste, Düsseldorf, class Tal R
- 2009 work presentation, Baumwollspinnerei, Leipzig
- 2009 Lubok, Museum of Fine Arts, Leipzig
- 2008 book project "Dem neuen Himmel eine neue Erde", with Raymond Pettibon, limited edition
- 2008 group exhibition of the final year class, HGB Leipzig
- 2007 ALS-Immendorf-Initiative of Charite Hospital Berlin, class Immendorf (Düsseldorf), class Rauch (Leipzig), class Richter (Berlin)
- 2007 Lubok 3, with Cindy Schmiedichen, Matthias Weischer, David Schnell a.o.
- 2005 mural, "o.T.", BMW branch office Leipzig, Alte Messe, in association with HGB Leipzig
- 2005 "TEST, TEST, TEST", Art-Atom, project space Schleifmühlengasse, Vienna
- 2004 Klasse Walter Obholzer, Galerie 422, Gmunden

=== Album cover artworks ===
- 2014 "Spree", Air Cushion Finish, Hamburg
- 2011 "111", ellenschneider, Rostock
- 2007 "Walls", Apparat, Berlin

=== Funding and grants ===
- 2015 long list, Art Aesthetica Art Prize
- 2009-2010 funding from the European Social Fund
- 2006 travel grant to Los Angeles and San Francisco, Friedrich-Ebert-Stiftung
- 2004-2008 grant by the Friedrich-Ebert-Stiftung, funding for the main course Fine Arts
