= Luciferian Towers =

2017 album by Godspeed You! Black Emperor

Studio album by Godspeed You! Black Emperor
- Released: 22 September 2017
- Studio: Hotel2Tango, Montreal; The Pines, Griffintown
- Length: 44:04
- Label: Constellation
- Producer: Godspeed You! Black Emperor; Greg Norman

Godspeed You! Black Emperor chronology
Asunder, Sweet and Other Distress (2015)	Luciferian Towers (2017)	G_d's Pee at State's End! (2021)

Singles from Luciferian Towers
- 1. "Undoing a Luciferian Towers" Released: 30 August 2017; 2. "Anthem for No State, Pt. III" Released: 7 September 2017

Luciferian Towers (sometimes stylized with quotation marks) is the sixth studio album by Canadian post-rock band Godspeed You! Black Emperor, released on 22 September 2017 by Constellation Records.

== Background ==
According to the Constellation Records one sheet about the album, Luciferian Towers was made "in the midst of communal mess, raising dogs and children. Eyes up and filled with dreadful joy – we aimed for wrong notes that explode, a quiet muttering amplified heavenward. We recorded it all in a burning motorboat." A list of "grand demands" also accompanied the information about the album, including:

- an end to foreign invasion
- an end to borders
- the total dismantling of the prison–industrial complex
- healthcare, housing, food and water acknowledged as an inalienable human right
- the expert fuckers who broke this world never get to speak again

== Reception ==
Professional ratings
Aggregate scores
Source	Rating
AnyDecentMusic?	7.6/10
Metacritic	78/100
Review scores
Source	Rating
AllMusic	4/5 stars
The A.V. Club	B+
Exclaim!	9/10
Mojo	4/5 stars
MusicOMH	4/5 stars
Pitchfork	7.3/10
Record Collector	4/5 stars
Sputnikmusic	4.5/5
Uncut	4/5 stars
The 405	9.5/10

Luciferian Towers was well received by contemporary music critics upon its release. At Metacritic, which assigns a normalized rating out of 100 to reviews from mainstream publications, the album received an average score of 78 based on 19 reviews.

In a four-star review for AllMusic, Paul Simpson concluded that "Like many of Godspeed's albums, Luciferian Towers might seem bleak or funereal on the surface, but ultimately, it's incredibly optimistic and hopeful. Perhaps out of necessity, the group seem more inspired here than they have in a while, and the result is arguably their best work since their 2000 opus Lift Your Skinny Fists Like Antennas to Heaven." The album received a B+ from The A.V. Club's Josh Modell, summing it up by calling the music, "incredible sounds to smash the state by". Sean T. Collins gave the album a rating of 7.3 out of 10 in the review for Pitchfork, stating "Godspeed's music is undergirded by its musicians' radical leftist politics (I mean, look at that press release), and that means there's hope rather than despair at its heart—a belief that collective struggle against our overlords is a battle worth fighting instead of a foregone conclusion to surrender to. It's this spirit that animates Luciferian Towers, the band's most melodic and powerfully positive-sounding album to date. One glance at the world around us offers a persuasive argument that it's the spirit we need."

Pretty Much Amazing reviewer Luke Fowler also praised the album, writing that "Luciferian Towers is a better album than Asunder. I'd venture that it's even better than 2012's 'Allelujah! Don't Bend! Ascend! by virtue of its interludes not being completely disposable. It's less bold than their earliest and best work (I wish they'd make another double LP one of these days), but it bodes well for their future, and stands as one of the best albums of the year."

== Track listing ==
=== Compact disc and vinyl editions ===
No.	Title	Length
1.	"Undoing a Luciferian Towers"	7:47
2.	"Bosses Hang"	14:45
3.	"Fam / Famine"	6:44
4.	"Anthem for No State"	14:48
Total length:		44:04

=== Digital edition ===
No.	Title	Length
1.	"Undoing a Luciferian Towers"	7:47
2.	"Bosses Hang, Pt. I"	4:39
3.	"Bosses Hang, Pt. II"	4:40
4.	"Bosses Hang, Pt. III"	5:24
5.	"Fam / Famine"	6:44
6.	"Anthem for No State, Pt. I"	3:05
7.	"Anthem for No State, Pt. II"	2:55
8.	"Anthem for No State, Pt. III"	8:36
Total length:		43:50

== Personnel ==
=== Godspeed You! Black Emperor ===
- Thierry Amar – upright bass, bass guitar
- David Bryant – electric guitar, MG-1
- Aidan Girt – drums
- Timothy Herzog – drums
- Efrim Manuel Menuck – electric guitar, organ, OP-1
- Mike Moya – electric guitar
- Mauro Pezzente – bass guitar
- Sophie Trudeau – violin, organ

=== Guests on "Undoing a Luciferian Towers" ===
- Bonnie Kane – saxophone, flute, electronics
- Craig Pedersen – trumpet

== Charts ==
Chart (2017)	Peak position
Belgian Albums (Ultratop Flanders)	58
Belgian Albums (Ultratop Wallonia)	131
German Albums (Offizielle Top 100)	100
Dutch Albums (Album Top 100)	112
Scottish Albums (OCC)	11
UK Albums (OCC)	34
