= Casa del Popolo =

Bar, bistro, and music venue in Montreal, Canada

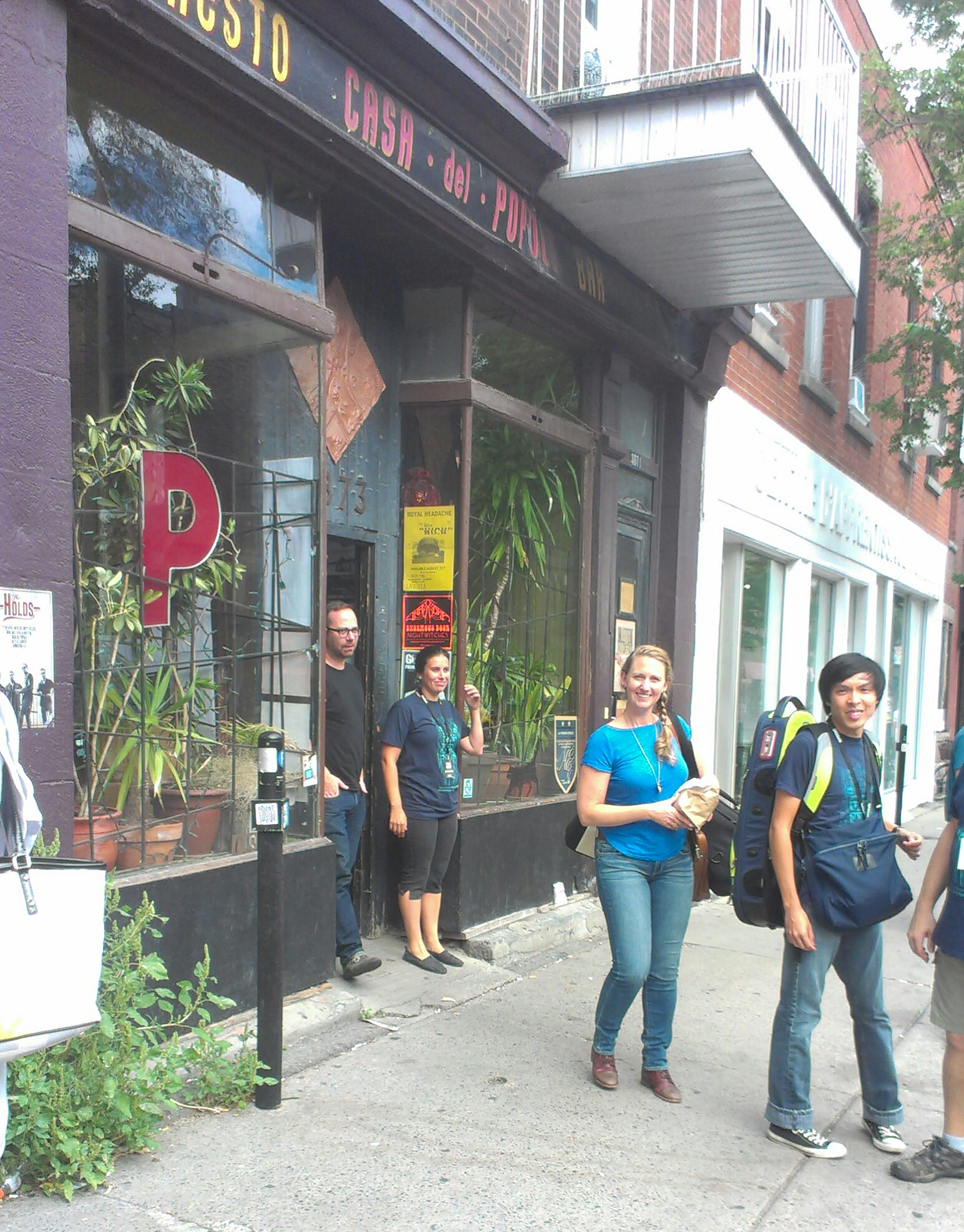
- Victoria Vox in front of Casa del Popolo in 2015
- Interactive map of Casa del Popolo
- Location: 4873, boulevard Saint-Laurent; Montreal, Quebec, Canada
- Coordinates: 45.5222°N 73.5905°W
- Owner: Mauro Pezzente; Kiva Stimac
- Type: Bistro; Nightclub
- Event: Indie

Construction
- Opened: September 2000

Website
- casadelpopolo.com

Casa del Popolo is a bar, bistro, and music venue in Montreal, Quebec, Canada, on Saint Laurent Boulevard in the borough of Le Plateau-Mont-Royal. Its name is Italian for "House of the People".

It was established in September 2000 by Godspeed You! Black Emperor bassist Mauro Pezzente and his partner Kiva Stimac. Since then, the Casa has hosted performances by Arcade Fire, Buck 65, ...And You Will Know Us By The Trail Of Dead, Do Make Say Think, Moldy Peaches, Carla Bozulich, and many more. Casa has also hosted non-musical performances, including slideshows by Seth and book launches by Jonathan Goldstein.

Fodor's describes Casa del Popolo as "one of (Montreal's) top venues for indie rock music", and Frommer's has compared it to CBGB.
