= Asunder, Sweet and Other Distress =

2015 album by Godspeed You! Black Emperor

Studio album by Godspeed You! Black Emperor
- Released: 31 March 2015
- Recorded: 2013–2014
- Studios: Fidelitorium, North Carolina; Hotel2Tango, Montreal; The Pines, Montreal
- Genre: Post-rock
- Length: 40:23
- Label: Constellation

Godspeed You! Black Emperor chronology
| 'Allelujah! Don't Bend! Ascend! (2012) | Asunder, Sweet and Other Distress (2015) | Luciferian Towers (2017) |

Asunder, Sweet and Other Distress is the fifth studio album by Canadian post-rock band Godspeed You! Black Emperor, released on 31 March 2015 by Constellation Records. The album is composed of four tracks developed from a single long-form composition known by fans as "Behemoth", which had been performed extensively in live tours between 2012 and 2014. Recorded at studios in North Carolina and Montreal, the album was the group's first to consist entirely of new material written since their reformation in 2010, distinguishing it from their previous release, 'Allelujah! Don't Bend! Ascend!, which featured older compositions.

The album juxtaposes two dense, riff-driven compositions with a pair of ambient drone-based pieces, marking a shift toward a more concise and distilled sonic approach. The album received widespread acclaim from music critics who praised its intensity and cohesion, and the evolution of the band's sound.

== Background and recording ==
Asunder, Sweet and Other Distress originated from a single extended piece known among fans as "Behemoth", which was developed and refined through live performances prior to the album's recording. The piece, also informally referred to as "Big 'Un", was performed extensively during the band's 2010–2012 tours, and previously recorded onstage for the concert series We Have Signal. "Behemoth" became a fixture of the band's setlists, including their 2013 support dates on Nine Inch Nails' Tension tour, where it was occasionally the sole performance in their set.

Unlike their 2012 album 'Allelujah! Don't Bend! Ascend!, which consisted of previously unreleased material written before the band's 2003 hiatus, Asunder, Sweet and Other Distress marked the first release of entirely new music composed after the band's 2010 reformation. The piece was gradually honed into a concise four-track structure, transforming the sprawling live arrangement into a more focused studio composition. The final album is a condensed and arranged version of "Behemoth".

Recording sessions took place in 2013 and 2014 at Fidelitorium Recordings in North Carolina, as well as at Hotel2Tango and guitarist David Bryant's Montreal studio, the Pines, with longtime collaborator Greg Norman serving as recording and mixing engineer. At just over 40 minutes, the album became the band's shortest full-length release since the vinyl version of their 1997 debut F♯ A♯ ∞, and the first to exclude sampled or field-recorded voices.

== Musical style ==
Asunder, Sweet and Other Distress retains Godspeed You! Black Emperor's signature post-rock sound, marked by gradual build-ups, extended crescendos, and a strong emphasis on dynamics and atmosphere. Compared to the group's earlier, more expansive works, the album presents a more concise and focused musical statement. Clocking out at approximately 40 minutes, it consists of four tracks that evolved from a single long-form composition known in live performances as "Behemoth".

Instrumentally, the album features bass, drums, keyboards, violin, and electric guitars. Structurally, the album is often divided into two expansive, symphonic tracks ("Peasantry or 'Light! Inside of Light!'" and "Piss Crowns Are Trebled") which bookend two ambient drone-based pieces, ("Lambs' Breath" and "Asunder, Sweet"). The first track, "Peasantry or 'Light! Inside of Light!'", opens with a pronounced drum beat and distorted guitars, immediately departing from the band's typical gradual build-ups. AllMusic critic Thom Jurek likened the heavy riffing and drum patterns to heavy metal and in particular Black Sabbath while later sections introduce string melodies and Balkan-influenced motifs.

The central portion of the album, comprising "Lambs' Breath" and "Asunder, Sweet", is dominated by extended drone passages and ambient textures. These tracks make use of tonal and microtonal drones, heavily distorted basslines, guitar feedback, bowed cymbals, and minimal melodic movement. While The Quietus's Tristan Bath characterised these pieces as abstract or alienating, MusicOMH's Sam Shephard emphasised their role in establishing a disquieting atmosphere and serving as the album's conceptual core. The final track, "Piss Crowns Are Trebled", builds from an ambient introduction into a climactic crescendo of militaristic drumming, layered guitars, and soaring strings. The piece has been described by Andrzej Lukowski of Drowned in Sound as one of the band's most powerful closers, blending their earlier emotive style with the more forceful direction of the album as a whole.

== Release and packaging ==
Asunder, Sweet and Other Distress was released by Constellation Records on 31 March 2015. The album was made available in CD, digital, and LP formats. On 24 February 2015, the band announced the album through Pitchfork and shared an eight-minute excerpt of "Peasantry or 'Light! Inside of Light!'" on SoundCloud. The LP version of the album is pressed onto two sides of vinyl, in contrast to the previous album, which included a separate 7-inch record for shorter pieces. The A-side ends with a locked groove, allowing the final drone to loop indefinitely. In the CD version, the two middle tracks play continuously without a break.

The album's inner artwork references the band's 2013 Polaris Music Prize acceptance statement, in which the band criticised the music industry and redirected the prize money to fund musical instruments in prisons. The statement's closing words, "we love you so much / our country is fucked", are printed between an inverted Canadian flag at half-mast and a black-and-white photograph of grazing sheep, imagery interpreted by Shephard as a critique of societal complacency.

== Critical reception ==
Professional ratings
Aggregate scores
| Source | Rating |
|---|---|
| AnyDecentMusic? | 7.9/10 |
| Metacritic | 84/100 |
Review scores
| Source | Rating |
| AllMusic | 3.5/5 stars |
| The A.V. Club | A− |
| Drowned in Sound | 9/10 |
| Exclaim! | 8/10 |
| The Guardian | 4/5 stars |
| MusicOMH | 4.5/5 stars |
| Paste | 9.3/10 |
| Pitchfork | 7.6/10 |
| Spin | 8/10 |
| Sputnikmusic | 4/5 |

Asunder, Sweet and Other Distress has received acclaim from critics. At the review aggregator Metacritic, which assigns a weighted average rating out of 100 to reviews from mainstream critics, the album received a rating of 84 based on eleven critic reviews, indicating "universal acclaim". Similarly, on AnyDecentMusic?, it received a rating of 7.9 out of 10, based on eight reviews.

Pitchfork's Mark Richardson described the album as a "different kind of transaction" from the rest of their catalogue, requiring open-minded listening and transforming "feelings into compelling records". Writing for Exclaim!, Nilan Perera called the record "a beautiful, concise blast that conveys this band's musical essence". Writing for Sputnikmusic, pseudonymous staff reviewer "Sowing" gave the album a highly positive review, characterizing it as a "thematic and musical awakening" for the band. He praised the album's "bold, sleek, and fast" ability to reimagine the band's established sound, and resisted stagnation despite the group's long career and periods of hiatus. He regarded the album's middle drone tracks as essential to its structure, calling them the "heart of it all".

In a review for AllMusic, Thom Jurek praised Asunder, Sweet and Other Distress for its intensity and refinement, calling it a sharpened and focused work with "maximum impact". He regarded the album as a powerful reflection on destruction and transformation, concluding that its final moments represent "the undoing of a world". In her The Guardian review, Maddy Costa described the album as a "resolute and defiant" return for the band. She praised the album's emotional depth and interpretive richness, framing it as both a reflection on collective political struggle and a metaphor for the band's own collaborative persistence. Writing for The Skinny, Gary Kaill awarded it four stars out of five, describing it as "brief by their own epic standards", noting that its four-track configuration lent the album a surprising degree of accessibility compared to the band's earlier work. Later that year, the publication ranked it as their 24th favorite album of 2015.

Writing for Paste, Tyler Kane described it as a "true piece of art", noting favorably its seamless structure and emotional payoff. He viewed the album as a focused and refined document of the band's long-developed live piece "Behemoth", highlighting how it retained its intensity and nuance while avoiding the excesses of improvisation. Tristan Bath of The Quietus praised the album as a "deceptively meaningful step" for the band, calling it a potent and distilled work that showcases the band at their most direct and uncompromising. He described the album as "pure distilled, 200 proof revolutionary instrumental rock" and noted that the group had shed previous elements such as spoken word and melancholy interludes in favor of a stripped-down, high-volume approach. Jonathan Dick of Spin said that the album is the band's "heaviest and darkest release to date". He praised the band's sharpened focus and sense of urgency, noting that while their hallmark orchestral crescendos remained intact, the album's immediacy and minimalism marked a shift toward restraint over volatility.

== Track listing ==
| No. | Title | Length |
|---|---|---|
| 1. | "Peasantry or 'Light! Inside of Light!'" | 10:28 |
| 2. | "Lambs' Breath" | 9:52 |
| 3. | "Asunder, Sweet" | 6:13 |
| 4. | "Piss Crowns Are Trebled" | 13:50 |
| Total length: | | 40:32 |

== Personnel ==
Credits are adapted from the album's liner notes.

=== Godspeed You! Black Emperor ===
- Thierry Amar – bass guitar, double bass
- David Bryant – electric guitar, Portasound, organ, drones
- Aidan Girt – drums
- Timothy Herzog – drums and drones
- Efrim Menuck – electric guitar
- Mike Moya – electric guitar
- Mauro Pezzente – bass guitar
- Sophie Trudeau – violin, drones
- Karl Lemieux – 16mm film projections

=== Technical personnel ===
- Greg Norman – recording, mixing
- Harris Newman at Greymarket – mastering

== Charts ==
| Chart (2015) | Peak position |
|---|---|
| UK Albums (Official Charts) | 37 |
| French Albums (SNEP) | 179 |
| US Billboard 200 | 129 |
