= "No Title As of 13 February 2024 28,340 Dead" =

Studio album by Godspeed You! Black Emperor
- Released: 4 October 2024
- Recorded: 2024
- Studios: Hotel2Tango, Montreal, Canada
- Genre: Post-rock
- Length: 54:09
- Labels: Constellation; CST183
- Producer: Jace Lasek

Godspeed You! Black Emperor chronology
G_d's Pee at State's End! (2021)	"No Title As of 13 February 2024 28,340 Dead" (2024)

Singles from "No Title As of 13 February 2024 28,340 Dead"
- 1. "Grey Rubble – Green Shoots" Released: 28 August 2024

"No Title As of 13 February 2024 28,340 Dead" (stylized in all caps) is the eighth studio album by Canadian post-rock band Godspeed You! Black Emperor, released on 4 October 2024 by Constellation Records. It follows their 2021 release G_d's Pee at State's End!, and was preceded by a single, as "Grey Rubble – Green Shoots" was released alongside the album's announcement on 27 August 2024.

== Background ==
The title refers to the reported number of Palestinian deaths by Israeli strikes between 7 October 2023 and 13 February 2024 during the Gaza war, according to the Gaza Health Ministry. In a statement of the album announcement, the band proclaimed: "No Title= What gestures make sense while tiny bodies fall? What context? What broken melody? And then a tally and a date to mark a point on the line, the negative process, the growing pile".

In February 2024, the band premiered three new songs at the Knockdown Center in New York City.

On 27 August 2024, while embarking on a North American tour, the band announced the album, releasing the single "Grey Rubble – Green Shoots", which was engineered and mixed by Jace Lasek and mastered by Harris Newman, along with additional 2025 tour dates in North America and Europe.

== Critical reception ==
Professional ratings
Aggregate scores
Source	Rating
AnyDecentMusic?	7.2/10
Metacritic	79/100
Review scores
Source	Rating
AllMusic	4/5 stars
Beats per Minute	86%
Classic Rock	3.5/5 stars
The Observer	4/5 stars
Mojo	4/5 stars
Pitchfork	7.8/10
The Skinny	4/5 stars
Slant Magazine	3/5 stars
Tom Hull	B+
Uncut	4/5 stars

"No Title As of 13 February 2024 28,340 Dead" has received acclaim from critics. At the review aggregator Metacritic, which assigns a weighted average rating out of 100 to reviews from mainstream critics, the album received a rating of 79 based on eleven critic reviews, indicating "generally favorable" reviews. Similarly, on AnyDecentMusic?, it received a rating of 7.2 out of 10, based on eight reviews.

Slant Magazine gave the album 3 out of 5 stars and said "Godspeed's adherence to formula undercuts the visceral punch that, for decades, has been central to their appeal". The Observer called the release "powerfully brilliant" and said the band "have made an urgent soundtrack for an uncertain and dangerous world". BrooklynVegan said the album "has the raw urgency of an album that came together quickly and intuitively, as both a response and a soundtrack to ongoing mass tragedy, and it's as overpowering as any of Godspeed's best records". The Skinny described the album as "the embodiment of music as art", noting its warped, noisy instrumentation. The review highlighted the band's departure from corporate influence, traditional song structures, and algorithmically driven track lengths, allowing Godspeed You! Black Emperor to deliver an uncompromised message.

== Track listing ==
No.	Title	Length
1.	"Sun Is a Hole Sun Is Vapors"	5:32
2.	"Babys in a Thundercloud"	13:37
3.	"Raindrops Cast in Lead"	13:18
4.	"Broken Spires at Dead Kapital"	3:35
5.	"Pale Spectator Takes Photographs"	11:18
6.	"Grey Rubble – Green Shoots"	6:53
Total length:		54:09

Vinyl edition-exclusive bonus track

No.	Title	Length
7.	"Untitled" (Ambient reprise of "Grey Rubble")	13:05
Total length:		67:14

Notes

- All tracks stylized in all caps

== Personnel ==
Adapted from the liner notes on Bandcamp

=== Godspeed You! Black Emperor ===
- Thierry Amar – electric bass, double bass
- David Bryant – electric guitar, tape loops
- Aidan Girt – drums
- Timothy Herzog – drums, glockenspiel
- Efrim Manuel Menuck – electric guitar, tape loops
- Michael Moya – electric guitar
- Mauro Pezzente – electric bass
- Sophie Trudeau – violin
- Karl Lemieux, Philippe Leonard – 16mm projections

==== Additional Musician(s) ====
- Michele Fiedler Fuentes – voice on "Raindrops Cast in Lead"

=== Technical personnel ===
- Jace Lasek – recording engineer, mixing engineer
- Harris Newman – mastering engineer
- Martin Krafft – mastering engineer (lacquer cut by)
- Stacy Lee – photography

== Charts ==
Chart performance for No Title as of 13 February 2024 28,340 Dead
Chart (2024)	Peak position
Belgian Albums (Ultratop Flanders)	79
German Albums (Offizielle Top 100)	81
UK Albums (Official Charts)	97
