= Lift Your Skinny Fists like Antennas to Heaven =

2000 studio album by Godspeed You! Black Emperor

Studio album by Godspeed You! Black Emperor
- Released: October 9, 2000
- Recorded: February 2000
- Studios: Chemical Sound, Toronto, Ontario
- Genre: Post-rock
- Length: 87:21
- Labels: Constellation; Kranky
- Producer: Daryl Smith

Godspeed You! Black Emperor chronology
| Slow Riot for New Zerø Kanada (1999) | Lift Your Skinny Fists like Antennas to Heaven (2000) | Yanqui U.X.O. (2002) |

Lift Your Skinny Fists like Antennas to Heaven (Note: Also written Levez Vos Skinny Fists comme Antennas to Heaven and Lift Yr. Skinny Fists like Antennas to Heaven! on physical releases, often shortened to Lift Your Skinny Fists or its initials (LYSFLATH).) is the second studio album by Canadian post-rock band Godspeed You! Black Emperor, released as a double album on 9 October 2000 on vinyl by Constellation and on CD by Kranky. The album consists of four 20-minute songs divided into subsections or movements, usually consisting of instrumental crescendos, with occasional use of field recordings. Though the band's output is politically-motivated, the overall tone is more hopeful than their prior work. Recording was conducted in February 2000 in Chemical Sound Studios, Toronto, and was derived from the band's live performances and guitarist Efrim Menuck's experience in film-making studies.

Packaging contains liner notes dedicating the album to prisoners, a diagram illustrating each of the subsection's sound, and William Schaff's artwork from the zine Notes to a Friend; Silently Listening No. 2. The album has received critical acclaim, with many critics finding the composition to be beautiful and sprawling, though comparisons to the band's prior discography were mixed. It has been listed on multiple year-end and decade-end lists.

== Background and composition ==
Godspeed You! Black Emperor is a Montreal band formed in 1994; the band hails from the Canadian post-rock scene. The band's label Constellation plays a central role, although both founder Ian Ilavsky and Godspeed You! Black Emperor guitarist Efrim Menuck have stated they see their music as more punk rock than post-rock. Godspeed You! Black Emperor's politically motivated music output is primarily instrumental, being framed with field recordings and tape manipulation. According to The A.V. Club's Andrew Paul, their early work leading up to Lift Your Skinny Fists like Antennas to Heaven "[came] across like an attempt to blend divinity and human folly atop the same sonic canvas," with the music conveying humanity's hopelessness and self-destruction.

Godspeed You! Black Emperor released three records in the 1990s: the self-released cassette All Lights Fucked on the Hairy Amp Drooling (1994), the studio album F♯ A♯ ∞ (1997), and the EP Slow Riot for New Zero Kanada (1999). The band also regularly staged three-hour long live performances, including in major cities such as London, San Francisco, and New York City. During this time, they started receiving attention beyond the underground scene, with much critical analysis of their work. The band itself has typically avoided interviews and promotional material, citing concerns of misrepresentation of their work in the media and bafflement at their increased popularity. Two notable exceptions include their interviews for The Wire and NME, with the latter's being a cover interview despite the cover not featuring a picture of the band.

Godspeed You! Black Emperor – "Storm"
Excerpts from the opener, "Lift Yr. Skinny Fists, Like Antennas to Heaven...".

Lift Your Skinny Fists like Antennas to Heaven is a post-rock album consisting of four 20-minute tracks: "Storm", "Static", "Sleep", and "Antennas to Heaven", each of which are divided into subsections. Godspeed You! Black Emperor recorded the album in Chemical Sound Studios, Toronto, in nine days in February 2000 with Daryl Smith, using material drawn from the band's then-recent live performances. The instrumentation involved string instruments, guitars, pianos, and static. Most of the album is instrumental, often consisting of crescendoes from "slow and vaporous" music to "towering waves of sound" before dissipating. An exception is the use of field recordings, including a loudspeaker announcement from ARCO, a preacher's religious rant, an old man musing about Coney Island, and a folk song performed by band member Mike Moya. According to Menuck, the composition of the tracks drew upon his filmmaking studies, with him comparing the combining of musical pieces and field recordings to film editing. Compared to previous projects by Godspeed You! Black Emperor, Lift Your Skinny Fists like Antennas to Heaven is more progressive and hopeful. In a 2012 interview from the Guardian, the band collectively stated their intent from the beginning was to create "heavy music, joyously" that acknowledged yet dismissed the bleakness of contemporary times, contrary to popular belief. Jeanette Leech argued Lift Your Skinny Fists like Antennas to Heaven represented this ideal in Fearless: the Making of Post-Rock.

== Release and packaging ==
Lift Your Skinny Fists like Antennas to Heaven was released as a double album on 9 October 2000 by Constellation in vinyl format and on 23 October 2000 by American record label Kranky in CD format. The typewritten liner notes jokingly refer to the band as "god's [sic] pee"; refer to the songs as "more awkward pirouettes in the general direction of hope [and] joy" and "a tentative stagger towards the pale [and] holy fading light"; and dedicate the album to prisoners, alongside "quiet refusals, loud refusals, and sad refusals." The inner panels of the vinyl edition and a paper insert in the CD edition uses a diagram drawn by Menuck to illustrate the album's composition and sound. The diagram denotes the time length and name of each subsection, and uses gradients to represent their intensity.

The album's packaging contains artwork by William Schaff from a zine titled Notes to a Friend; Silently Listening No. 2, which dealt with his struggles as a young artist. Schaff first met Menuck at Hotel2Tango, bonding over their shared interests and themes of workers' plight. Later, after he left behind some of his work at Hotel2Tango, Menuck approached him for permission to use his work for the album. One image included in the packaging depicts Benjamin Franklin severing Schaff's hands with shears as he is signing a lease, while another depicts Schaff, his wrists bandaged, witnessing George Washington and Franklin waving a pantsuit in front of a withdrawn woman. The cover art, depicting Schaff's severed hands, was repurposed from Notes to a Friend; Silently Listening No. 2 by John Arthur Tinholt.

Lift Your Skinny Fists like Antennas to Heaven entered into the UK charts, run by the Official Charts Company, on the week of 21 October 2000. The album was on the UK Independent Albums Charts for five weeks, peaking at number five, and was on two other charts for one week, peaking at number 66 for the UK Album Charts and number 69 for the Scottish Albums Charts.

The album, along with the rest of Godspeed You! Black Emperor's discography, was removed from streaming services on 17 August 2025. Their label, Constellation, made no comment on the situation.

== Reception ==
Professional ratings
Aggregate scores
| Source | Rating |
|---|---|
| Metacritic | 84/100 |
Review scores
| Source | Rating |
| AllMusic | 5/5 stars |
| Alternative Press | 5/5 |
| The Austin Chronicle | 4/5 stars |
| The Guardian | 3/5 stars |
| NME | 9/10 |
| Pitchfork | 9.0/10 |
| Q | 4/5 stars |
| Rolling Stone | 3/5 stars |
| Select | 5/5 |
| Spin | 8/10 |

Lift Your Skinny Fists like Antennas to Heaven garnered critical acclaim. On Metacritic, it has a score of 84 based on 13 reviews, indicating "universal acclaim". Critics have regarded the album to be beautiful and sprawling. (Note: Attributed to multiple sources:) Alternative Press called it "a massive instrumental effort" that is "as skilled and musical as it is on-the-fly improvised and messy", and The Austin Chronicle calling it "cinematic" and "breathtaking in its grandiose beauty". Highlighting the album's uplifting nature and use of field recordings, The Village Voice called Lift Your Skinny Fists Like Antennas the "best movie I've seen all year." Among more mixed reviews, Rolling Stone found the album one-note but commended its compositional ambition, and The Guardian noted occasional "passages of spellbinding beauty" but found the listening experience uneven.

Critical comparisons with Godspeed You! Black Emperor's prior discography were divided. The A.V. Club called the album "as beautiful and disarming as its predecessors". Pitchfork assessed the first disc as representative of the band's past work and the second disc to be "the future", and AllMusic found the album overall to be less predictable due to its dynamic nature. In contrast, The Wire found the album to be more meaningless, with the radical nature of Godspeed You! Black Emperor's music being "reduced to rock gesture". Both Spin and The Guardian considered the album less consistent than the band's prior work.

Retrospectively, critical reception of Lift Your Skinny Fists like Antennas to Heaven has remained positive. Tiny Mix Tapes called the album "alternately hypnotic and captivating, sleepy and startling" comparing its sounds to "a far subtler Pink Floyd". Sputnikmusic gave the album a perfect score and, deeming the album indescribable, called upon the reader to listen to the album for themselves. In their 20th anniversary reviews, both The A.V. Club and Stereogum deemed the album as representative of the failures of capitalism in the 21st century and highly mythical and evocative. PopMatters positively emphasized the album's instrumental and protesting nature.

The album went on to be included in numerous year-end and decade-end music lists. Magnet included it in its "20 Best Albums of 2000" list. NME ranked it number 16 in its "Top 50 Albums of the Year". Sputnikmusic named it the 6th best album of the 2000s. Pitchfork named it the 5th best album of the year and the 65th best album of the decade. They also ranked the first subsection of the track "Storm" at number 283 on their list of "Top 500 tracks of the 2000s". Tiny Mix Tapes ranked it 7th on their "Favorite 100 Albums of 2000–2009" list. LAS Magazine ranked it the 14th greatest album of the decade. Gigwise included the album on its list of the 50 best albums of the 2000s. A 2020 BBC overview of double albums lists this as an "honorable mention" for releases that the audience needs to hear. Paste magazine placed this album on 6 in their list of 50 post-rock albums of all time.

== Track listing ==
Adapted from Godspeed You! Black Emperor's official discography.

Disc one
| No. | Title | Length |
|---|---|---|
| 1. | "Storm": "Lift Yr. Skinny Fists, Like Antennas to Heaven..."; "Gathering Storm" / "Il Pleut à Mourir [+Clatters Like Worry]"; "'Welcome to Barco AM/PM...' [L.A.X.; 5/14/00]"; "Cancer Towers on Holy Road Hi-Way" | 22:32: 6:15; 11:10; 1:15; 3:52 |
| 2. | "Static": "Terrible Canyons of Static"; "Atomic Clock."; "Chart #3"; "World Police and Friendly Fire"; "[...+The Buildings They Are Sleeping Now]" | 22:35: 3:34; 1:09; 2:39; 9:48; 5:25 |
| Total length: | | 45:07 |

Disc two
| No. | Title | Length |
|---|---|---|
| 3. | "Sleep": "Murray Ostril: '...They Don't Sleep Anymore on the Beach...'"; "Monheim"; "Broken Windows, Locks of Love Pt. III." / "3rd Part" | 23:17: 1:10; 12:14; 9:53 |
| 4. | "Like Antennas to Heaven...": "Moya Sings 'Baby-O'..."; "Edgyswingsetacid"; "[Glockenspiel Duet Recorded on a Campsite in Rhinebeck, N.Y.]"; "'Attention...Mon Ami...Fa-Lala-Lala-La-La...' [55-St. Laurent]'"; "She Dreamt She Was a Bulldozer, She Dreamt She Was Alone in an Empty Field"; "Deathkamp Drone"; "[Antennas to Heaven...]" | 18:57: 1:00; 0:58; 0:46; 1:18; 9:43; 3:09; 2:02 |
| Total length: | | 42:14 |

== Personnel ==
Adapted from liner notes and AllMusic. Names are in order based on liner notes.

Godspeed You! Black Emperor

- Sophie Trudeau – violin
- Norsola Johnson – cello
- David Bryant – electric guitar
- Thierry Amar – bass guitar
- Aidan Girt – drums
- Mauro Pezzente – bass guitar
- Bruce Cawdron – drums
- Roger Tellier-Craig – guitar
- Efrim Menuck – guitar

Other personnel

- Daryl Smith – recording
- Brian Cram – horn (tracks 1a and 3c)
- Alfons – horn (tracks 1a and 3c)

== Charts ==
| Chart (2000) | Peak position |
|---|---|
| Scottish Albums (Official Charts) | 69 |
| UK Albums (Official Charts) | 66 |
| UK Independent Albums (Official Charts) | 5 |

== Sources ==
- Adams, Bruce (1 November 2023). "After This They Chose Silence: 2000–2002". You're with Stupid: kranky, Chicago, and the Reinvention of Indie Music. University of Texas Press. doi:10.7560/321201. ISBN 978-1-47-732616-9. S2CID 251340352.
- Barclay, Michael (26 April 2022). Hearts on Fire: Six Years that Changed Canadian Music 2000–2005. ECW Press. ISBN 978-1-77-305904-4.
- Leech, Jeanette (2017). Fearless: the Making of Post-Rock. Jawbone Publisher. ISBN 978-1-91-103615-9.
