= Yanqui U.X.O. =

Studio album by Godspeed You! Black Emperor
- Released: November 4, 2002
- Recorded: 2001
- Studios: Electrical Audio, Chicago
- Genre: Post-rock
- Length: 75:00 (CD); 83:58 (vinyl)
- Label: Constellation
- Producer: Steve Albini

Godspeed You! Black Emperor chronology
Lift Your Skinny Fists Like Antennas to Heaven (2000)	Yanqui U.X.O. (2002)	'Allelujah! Don't Bend! Ascend! (2012)

Yanqui U.X.O. is the third studio album by Canadian post-rock band Godspeed You! Black Emperor, released on November 4, 2002 by Constellation. It was recorded by Steve Albini at Electrical Audio in Chicago in late 2001, and was the band's first album released after their slight name change (moving the exclamation mark from the "emperor" to the "you"). Lacking both their characteristic interwoven field recordings and specifically named movements, the album was instead described by the band as "just raw, angry, dissonant, epic instrumental rock". Shortly after its release, the group announced an indefinite hiatus so band members could pursue differing musical interests; it was their last album for a decade until the release of 2012's 'Allelujah! Don't Bend! Ascend!.

== Background ==
Yanqui is the Spanish word for "Yankee". The liner notes also refer to "Yanqui" as a "multinational corporate oligarchy", while "U.X.O." stands for "unexploded ordnance". The packaging of the album contains an arrow diagram purporting to represent the links between four major record labels (AOL Time-Warner, BMG, Sony, Vivendi Universal) and various arms manufacturers. This chart accompanied a photograph of falling bombs. The band later acknowledged that a particular extension of the chart (namely EMI appearing on the chart as a subsidiary of AOL Time-Warner) was incorrect.

The album was released as a CD and a double vinyl LP. The LP differs in three ways from the CD:

First, the two-part composition "09-15-00" is compounded into one part. The album liner notes imply that on this date the second Palestinian intifada began, although this is incorrect.

Second, an untitled "hidden" track is added after some silence, in a similar manner to the short song "J.L.H. Outro" on the CD release of F♯ A♯ ∞. This ulterior track consists of a sampled and cut-up George W. Bush speech with applause added. The track also appears on bandmember Aidan Girt's related project 1-Speed Bike's debut album Droopy Butt Begone! (2000) in the track "The Day that Mauro Ran Over Elwy Yost", as well as on Museum Fire Records' compilation Azadi! (2003), a benefit for the Revolutionary Association of the Women of Afghanistan where it is titled "George Bush Cut Up While Talking".

Finally, the second part of the two-part track "Motherfucker=Redeemer" is about five minutes longer on the LP due to an extended ambient opening.

Common alternate titles for certain pieces used by the band on setlists include "12-28-99" (which became "09-15-00"), "Tazer Floyd" (became "Rockets Fall on Rocket Falls"), and "Tiny Silver Hammers" (became "Motherfucker=Redeemer").

== Recording ==
The album was recorded at Electrical Audio by Steve Albini. The record was mixed by the band and Howard Bilerman (who also did some additional recording) at the Hotel2Tango in Montreal, and mastered by John Loder and Steve Rooke at Abbey Road Studios in London, UK.

== Reception ==
Professional ratings
Aggregate scores
Source	Rating
Metacritic	80/100
Review scores
Source	Rating
AllMusic	3.5/5 stars
Blender	4/5 stars
Drowned in Sound	10/10
The Guardian	4/5 stars
Mojo	4.5/5 stars
Pitchfork	5.6/10
Q	3/5 stars
Spin	7/10
Stylus Magazine	B+
Uncut	4/5 stars

Yanqui U.X.O received a rating of 80 out of 100 on the online review aggregator Metacritic, which corresponds with "generally favorable reviews", based on 16 reviews. While some, such as Thom Jurek of AllMusic, praised the release as being among the group's finest albums, others, like Ryan Schreiber of Pitchfork, derided it for its "sluggishness and a lack of invention".

Playlouder ranked the album at number 47 on their list of the top 50 albums of 2002.

== Track listing ==
=== Compact disc ===
No.	Title	Length
1.	"09-15-00"	16:27
2.	"09-15-00 (cont.)"	6:17
3.	"Rockets Fall on Rocket Falls"	20:42
4.	"Motherfucker=Redeemer"	21:22
5.	"Motherfucker=Redeemer (cont.)"	10:10
Total length:		74:57

=== Vinyl edition ===
Side one
No.	Title	Length
1.	"09-15-00"	22:40

Side two
No.	Title	Length
2.	"Rockets Fall on Rocket Falls"	20:43

Side three
No.	Title	Length
3.	"Motherfucker=Redeemer"	21:30

Side four
No.	Title	Length
4.	"Motherfucker=Redeemer (cont.)": (Hidden track: George Bush Cut Up While Talking)"	15:25: 3:40

== Personnel ==
Godspeed You! Black Emperor

- Thierry Amar – bass guitar, double bass
- David Bryant – electric guitar
- Bruce Cawdron – drums
- Aidan Girt – drums
- Norsola Johnson – cello
- Efrim Menuck – electric guitar
- Mauro Pezzente – bass guitar
- Roger Tellier-Craig – electric guitar
- Sophie Trudeau – violin

Other musicians

- Josh Abrams – double bass
- Geof Bradfield – bass clarinet
- Rob Mazurek – trumpet
- Matana Roberts – clarinet

Production

- Steve Albini – recording, production
- Howard Bilerman – mixing
- Godspeed You! Black Emperor – mixing
- John Loder – mastering
- Steve Rooke – mastering
