= 'Allelujah! Don't Bend! Ascend! =

2012 studio album by Godspeed You! Black Emperor

Studio album by Godspeed You! Black Emperor
- Released: October 1, 2012
- Recorded: April 2011
- Studios: Hotel2Tango, Montreal
- Genres: Post-rock; experimental; noise rock
- Length: 53:09
- Labels: Constellation; CST081
- Producers: Thierry Amar; David Bryant; Howard Bilerman; Efrim Menuck; Mike Moya

Godspeed You! Black Emperor chronology
Yanqui U.X.O. (2002)	'Allelujah! Don't Bend! Ascend! (2012)	Asunder, Sweet and Other Distress (2015)

'Allelujah! Don't Bend! Ascend! (sometimes stylized in all caps) is the fourth studio album by Canadian post-rock band Godspeed You! Black Emperor, released on Constellation Records. It was their first album since 2002's Yanqui U.X.O.. After reforming in 2010, the group went on tour and silently released the album at a concert in Boston on October 1, 2012, with official release dates on October 15 in Europe and the following day in other countries. The album received positive reviews and has been heralded as a comeback for the collective, winning the 2013 Polaris Music Prize.

The album marked the beginning of a major stylistic change for Godspeed You! Black Emperor, being less technically complex and focusing more on drones while abandoning the concept of movements altogether – a compositional format they would continue to employ until 2021's G_d's Pee at State's End!.

== Critical reception ==
Professional ratings
Aggregate scores
Source	Rating
AnyDecentMusic?	8.0/10
Metacritic	81/100
Review scores
Source	Rating
AllMusic	3.5/5 stars
The A.V. Club	B+
The Guardian	5/5 stars
The Independent	3/5 stars
Mojo	4/5 stars
The Observer	4/5 stars
Pitchfork	9.3/10
Q	3/5 stars
Rolling Stone	4/5 stars
Spin	9/10

'Allelujah! Don't Bend! Ascend! received positive reviews from critics. Eli Kleman of Sputnikmusic stated that the album has "immeasurable breadth and depth" and is a "truly unforgettable experience". Drowned in Sound's Andrzej Lukowski said that the release is "a modestly magnificent record that entirely validates" the band reforming.

Mark Richardson of Pitchfork also draws a connection between the group's entire output, finishing his review by calling this "an album of music that is both new and old from a band that we thought we might never hear from again, one we should appreciate while we can".

Tyler Kane of Paste gave the album an 8.9 out of 10, writing that, "the time-tested tracks not only showcase the band doing what they do best in notoriously long, dramatic, panic-inducing instrumentals but are also startling reminders on why the band was so vital and lead such a movement to begin with".

The Guardian's Dom Lawson gave the album 5 out of 5 stars, because "the Godspeed ethos of wordlessly eliciting universal truths remains as devastatingly effective as ever".

== Accolades ==
The album was listed 13th on Stereogum's list of top 50 albums of 2012.

The album won the 2013 Polaris Music Prize on September 23, 2013.

== Track listing ==
=== LP release ===
==== Disc A (12") ====
Side A1
No.	Title	Length
1.	"Mladic (Note: "Mladic" and "We Drift Like Worried Fire" are re-workings of previously unreleased live tracks formerly known as "Albanian" and "Gamelan", which have been performed live as far back as 2003.)"	19:54

Side A2
No.	Title	Length
1.	"We Drift like Worried Fire"	19:58

==== Disc B (7") ====
Side B1
No.	Title	Length
1.	"Their Helicopters' Sing"	6:30

Side B2
No.	Title	Length
1.	"Strung like Lights at thee Printemps Erable"	6:31
Total length:		52:53

=== CD release ===
No.	Title	Length
1.	"Mladic"	19:59
2.	"Their Helicopters' Sing"	6:30
3.	"We Drift like Worried Fire"	20:07
4.	"Strung like Lights at thee Printemps Erable"	6:31
Total length:		53:07

- The CD edition of the album compiles all four tracks on a single disc.

== Personnel ==
=== Godspeed You! Black Emperor ===
- Thierry Amar – bass guitar, double bass, cello
- David Bryant – electric guitar, hammered dulcimer, Portasound, kemençe
- Bruce Cawdron – drums, vibraphone, marimba, glockenspiel
- Aidan Girt – drums
- Efrim Menuck – electric guitar, hurdy-gurdy
- Mike Moya – electric guitar
- Mauro Pezzente – bass guitar
- Sophie Trudeau – violin, Casio SK-5
- Karl Lemieux – 16-mm film projections

=== Technical personnel ===
- Howard Bilerman – recording engineer (on "Mladic" and "We Drift like Worried Fire")
- Thierry Amar, David Bryant, Efrim Menuck – recording engineer, mixing engineer (on "Their Helicopters Sing" and "Strung like Lights at thee Printemps Erable")
- Harris Newman – mastering engineer
  - mastered at Greymarket
- Charles-André Coderre – cover photography
- Yannick Grandmont, David Bryant, Karl Lemieux, Efrim Menuck – photography
- Timothy Herzog – "Atonal Canada" photo

== Charts ==
Chart performance for 'Allelujah! Don't Bend! Ascend!
Chart (2012)	Peak position
Belgian Albums (Ultratop Flanders)	49
Belgian Albums (Ultratop Wallonia)	118
Dutch Albums (Album Top 100)	95
Finnish Albums (Suomen virallinen lista)	47
Swiss Albums (Schweizer Hitparade)	94
UK Albums (Official Charts)	41
US Billboard 200	45
US Independent Albums (Billboard)	9
US Top Alternative Albums (Billboard)	13
US Top Rock Albums (Billboard)	18
