= Slow Riot for New Zero Kanada E.P. =

EP by Godspeed You! Black Emperor
- Released: March 8, 1999
- Recorded: 1998
- Studios: The Gas Station in Toronto, Ontario, Canada
- Genre: Post-rock
- Length: 28:36
- Labels: Constellation; Kranky (reissue); CST006; KRANK 034 (reissue)

Godspeed You! Black Emperor chronology
F♯ A♯ ∞ (1997)	Slow Riot for New Zero Kanada E.P. (1999)	Lift Your Skinny Fists like Antennas to Heaven (2000)

Slow Riot for New Zero Kanada E.P. (stylised as Slow Riot for New Zerø Kanada E.P.) is the only EP and second release by Godspeed You! Black Emperor. It was released in Canada on the Montreal-based label Constellation Records in 1999, and concurrently in the US by Kranky.

Professional ratings
Review scores
Source	Rating
AllMusic	4/5 stars
NME	8/10
Pitchfork	9.0/10
Sputnikmusic	5/5

== Packaging ==
The EP's packaging makes only sparing reference to either the band or the EP's title: the outer packaging does not make any reference to Godspeed, but mentions them in the liner notes; the EP's title is only shown on the spine of the CD pressing. The song titles are not listed anywhere on the cover.

The cardboard album case is unusual in that it opens in the opposite direction of a conventional CD case; this is due to the Hebrew text being read from right to left.

The front of the EP contains Hebrew characters (Hebrew: תֹ֨ה֯וּ֙ וָבֹ֔הוּ, romanized: ṯōhū wā-ḇōhū, lit. ''formless and empty''). This phrase is used in both Genesis 1:2 and Jeremiah 4:23, the former to describe the Earth before God separated light from dark and the latter to describe the Earth after the Lord's Day. The dots and dashes above the letters are called trope. They dictate the tune and intonation and are found in the Torah as well as the rest of the Hebrew Bible. On the inside cover, this text is put into greater context, with Jer 4:23–27 provided in both Hebrew and English (seemingly the Jewish Publication Society version):

^{23} I beheld the earth,
And, lo, it was waste and void;
And the heavens, and they had no light.
^{24} I beheld the mountains, and, lo, they trembled,
And all the hills moved to and fro.
^{25} I beheld, and, lo, there was no man,
And all the birds of the heavens were fled.
^{26} I beheld, and, lo, the fruitful field was a wilderness,
And all the cities thereof were broken down
At the presence of the LORD,
And before His fierce anger.
^{27} For thus saith the LORD:
The whole land shall be desolate;
Yet will I not make a full end.

The back of the EP contains a diagram with instructions in Italian on how to make a molotov cocktail.

The EP is pressed on a 12" record with each side intended to be played at a different speed. Side A, "Moya", is played at 45 rpm, while side B, "BBF3", is played at 33 ⅓ rpm.

== Songs ==
=== "Moya" ===
The song title is a reference to band member Mike Moya. Concert setlists refer to this song as "Gorecki" because it is a reworking of his third symphony.

=== "BBF3" ===
The song title "BBF3" refers to the vox pop interviewee going by the name of "Blaise Bailey Finnegan III", whose eccentric ramblings form the core of the song. Finnegan recites a poem which he claims to have written himself. The poem is, in fact, composed mostly of lyrics from the song "Virus" by Iron Maiden that were written by their then-vocalist Blaze Bayley. Blaise Bailey Finnegan III is also heard interviewed at the beginning of the track "Providence" on the group's previous release F♯ A♯ ∞, and indeed some concert performances of "BBF3" also incorporate that sample.

== Track listing ==
No.	Title	Length
1.	"Moya"	10:51
2.	"BBF3"	17:45
Total length:		28:36

== Personnel ==
=== Godspeed You! Black Emperor ===
- Thierry Amar – bass guitar, double bass
- David Bryant – guitar, tapes
- Bruce Cawdron – drums, percussion, glockenspiel
- Aidan Girt – drums, percussion
- Norsola Johnson – cello
- Efrim Menuck – guitar, keyboards
- Mike Moya – guitar
- Mauro Pezzente – bass guitar
- Sophie Trudeau – violin

=== Technical personnel ===
- Dale Morningstar– recording engineer, mixing engineer
