= G d's Pee at State's End! =

G_d's Pee at State's End!

Studio album by Godspeed You! Black Emperor
- Released: 2 April 2021
- Studios: Hotel2Tango, Montreal
- Genre: Post-rock
- Length: 52:38
- Label: Constellation
- Producer: Jace Lasek

Godspeed You! Black Emperor chronology
Luciferian Towers (2017)	G_d's Pee at State's End! (2021)	No Title As of 13 February 2024 28,340 Dead (2024)

G_d's Pee at State's End! (stylized as G_d's Pee AT STATE'S END!) is the seventh studio album by the Canadian post-rock band Godspeed You! Black Emperor, released on 2 April 2021 by Constellation Records.

== Background ==
Godspeed You! Black Emperor released their sixth studio album, Luciferian Towers, in 2017. It received generally favorable reviews from music critics. They toured in support of the album from December 2017 to April 2018, with additional dates extending through August 2018.

In August 2019, the band played two new songs, "Glacier" and "Cliff", as a part of their live sets for the first time. According to a statement by the band, the material for the album was recorded in October 2020.

On 2 March 2021, the band released a video with a minute-long preview of the first track on the album: "A Military Alphabet (five eyes all blind) (4521.0kHz 6730.0kHz 4109.09kHz) / Job's Lament / First of the Last Glaciers / where we break how we shine (Rockets for Mary)". The following day, 3 March 2021, Constellation Records announced the scheduled release of G_d's Pee at State's End! for 2 April 2021. As with the band's previous album, Luciferian Towers, a statement including a list of demands was released with the announcement:

- empty the prisons
- take power from the police and give it to the neighbourhoods that they terrorise.
- end the forever wars and all other forms of imperialism.
- tax the rich until they're impoverished.

Prior to the release of the album, Constellation Records sent more than a hundred 10-inch vinyl records to independent record stores as review copies, instructing them "to share clips of [the preview] spinning in their stores or homes or wherever they find themselves with a turntable, in isolation or otherwise".

== Release ==
On 27 March 2021, the Saturday before the official release date, the band released an official livestream of the album in its entirety. The music was accompanied by a 16mm projection show from Karl Lemieux and Philippe Leonard, and shot in an empty Cinema Imperial in Montreal. The 16mm projections opened, as is characteristic of the band's live shows, with the word "HOPE" scratched white onto black on celluloid. The show also used footage of pylons, riots, and oil fires alongside the music. Such projection shows have long been a component of the band's live performances, but had not been released in an official capacity prior to the livestream. The album was officially released on 2 April.

== Composition ==
The album consists of one 12-inch LP and one 10-inch record. It consists of four pieces, two long and two short, a structure used on the band's earlier albums, 'Allelujah! Don't Bend! Ascend! and Luciferian Towers.

The album makes use of found sound recordings, a stylistic choice which the band is known for but which had been absent in their previous two releases.

The opening movement of the album, "A Military Alphabet (five eyes all blind) [4521.0kHz 6730.0kHz 4109.09kHz]", is a drone accompanied by recordings of shortwave radio transmissions and gunfire. A simple guitar riff transitions the first movement into the second, titled "Job's Lament". The core of the piece consists of the band's three guitars and two basses. The side closes with the movement "where we break how we shine (ROCKETS FOR MARY)", a recording of birds chirping while guns can be heard in the background.

Following the first long suite is "Fire at Static Valley", the first of the two shorter tracks on the 10-inch LP. The track is made up of drones, delay-heavy guitars, strings, and a kick drum.

The third side is the second large suite. It follows in form to the first also opening with samples of shortwave radio transmissions, and closing with a sample of clanging church bells. Reviewing the album for AllMusic, Paul Simpson assessed the track as "easily the most ecstatically triumphant music GY!BE have ever made".

The final track and second of the shorter two is a string piece titled "OUR SIDE HAS TO WIN (For D.H.)". The D.H. in the title refers to Dirk Hugsam, the long time European tour agent of the band. Hugsam died in December 2018 and, in addition to the track dedication, was eulogized by band members on the record label's website.

== Reception ==
Professional ratings
Aggregate scores
Source	Rating
AnyDecentMusic?	7.8/10
Metacritic	82/100
Review scores
Source	Rating
AllMusic	4/5 stars
Clash	8/10
Consequence of Sound	B+
Exclaim!	7/10
The Guardian	4/5 stars
MusicOMH	4/5 stars
NME	8/10
Paste	8.0/10
Pitchfork	8.1/10
Record Collector	5/5 stars

At Metacritic, which assigns a normalized rating out of 100 to reviews from mainstream publications, the album received an average score of 82 based on 19 reviews, indicating "universal acclaim".

Critics noted G_d's Pee, reintroducing found sound recordings and moving away from the ambient sounds of Luciferian Towers, as a return to form for the band, with Ben Salmon writing for Paste Magazine: "Having zigged for a while, Godspeed zags (of course) on G_d's Pee, bringing back some of the inscrutable elements that made the band so interesting in the first place."

Patrick Clarke of NME said that STATE'S END is a tumultuous record for tumultuous times, but there is a piece of galvanising beauty for every moment of crushing dread. Grayson Haver Currin of Pitchfork portrayed the album as being honest about 'the nonlinear shape of progress, or how winning the war to build a better world inherently entails a lot of devastating loss', even the album in entirety sounded 'more than glibly hopeful'. Writing for The Guardian, Kitty Empire commented that this album is a 'particularly rocking instalment of their familiar franchise; still head and shoulders above most other music that sails under the flag of post-rock'. British music magazine, Record Collector gave the album a full score of 5-star, praising the album as "the declaration of dogged resistance amid what GY!BE call our 'death-times' battles".

== Track listing ==
Physical release and digital download
No.	Title	Length
1.	"A Military Alphabet (five eyes all blind) (4521.0kHz 6730.0kHz 4109.09kHz) / Job's Lament / First of the Last Glaciers / where we break how we shine (Rockets for Mary)"	20:22
2.	"Fire at Static Valley"	5:58
3.	""Government Came" (9980.0kHz 3617.1kHz 4521.0 kHz) / Cliffs Gaze / cliffs' gaze at empty waters' rise / Ashes to Sea or Nearer to Thee"	19:48
4.	"Our Side Has to Win (for D.H.)"	6:30
Total length:		52:38

Streaming
No.	Title	Length
1.	"A Military Alphabet (five eyes all blind) [4521.0kHz 6730.0kHz 4109.09kHz]"	4:35
2.	"Job's Lament"	8:02
3.	"First of the Last Glaciers"	5:59
4.	"where we break how we shine (Rockets for Mary)"	1:44
5.	"Fire at Static Valley"	5:58
6.	""Government Came" (9980.0kHz 3617.1kHz 4521.0 kHz)"	11:36
7.	"Cliffs Gaze / cliffs' gaze at empty waters' rise / Ashes to Sea or Nearer to Thee"	8:12
8.	"Our Side Has to Win (for D.H.)"	6:30

== Personnel ==
- Aidan Girt – sitting drums and standing drums
- David Bryant – electric guitars, MG-1
- Efrim Manuel Menuck – electric guitars, OP-1, radios
- Mauro Pezzente – electric bass
- Michael Moya – electric guitars
- Sophie Trudeau – violins, organ
- Thierry Amar – electric bass and upright bass
- Timothy Herzog – sitting drums and standing drums, glockenspiel
- Karl Lemieux – 16mm projections
- Philippe Leonard – 16mm projections

== Charts ==
Chart performance for G_d's Pee at State's End!
Chart (2021)	Peak position
Australian Albums (ARIA)	87
Belgian Albums (Ultratop Flanders)	28
Belgian Albums (Ultratop Wallonia)	133
Dutch Albums (Album Top 100)	82
German Albums (Offizielle Top 100)	11
Irish Albums (IRMA)	74
Scottish Albums (Official Charts)	8
Spanish Albums (Promusicae)	75
Swedish Vinyl Albums (Sverigetopplistan)	4
Swiss Albums (Schweizer Hitparade)	21
UK Albums (Official Charts)	29
