= All Lights Fucked on the Hairy Amp Drooling =

Album by Godspeed You! Black Emperor

- Digital re-release cover, adapted from the original packaging

Studio album by God Speed You Black Emperor!
- Released: December 1994
- Recorded: March–November 1993
- Genre: Post-rock; avant-garde
- Length: 69:34
- Label: Self-released
- Producer: Efrim Menuck

God Speed You Black Emperor! chronology
All Lights Fucked on the Hairy Amp Drooling (1994)	F♯ A♯ ∞ (1997)

All Lights Fucked on the Hairy Amp Drooling is a cassette released in 1994 by Canadian musician Efrim Menuck, using the name God Speed You Black Emperor!. Given a limited release of 33 cassette copies in December 1994, the album quickly fell into obscurity and was thought lost by the band's fans, often described as the "Holy Grail of Post-Rock". Segments of the tape were leaked online in 2013 and the full recording surfaced in 2022, after which Menuck officially re-released the album on Bandcamp.

== Background ==
According to a 1998 interview with Godspeed You! Black Emperor, the album was published on cassette in 1994 and limited to 33 copies. At that point, the group consisted only of Efrim Menuck, Mauro Pezzente, and Mike Moya. Menuck says the limited release was "because that's what I could afford" due to the expense of its handmade inserts. According to Nashville Scene, "the tapes were as quickly sold as they were lost; there are no reported copies aside from what their label, Constellation Records, preserved", and Constellation has never reissued it. In 2013, FACT remarked that the release was "thought to be lost forever by the band's fans".

When asked about the subject in a 2010 interview, Menuck stated that All Lights is a vocal rock album that bears little relation to the band's later work, and that he "keep[s] expecting it's gonna pop up [on the internet] but it never does". In other interviews, Menuck stated that the album was a 4-track Portastudio recording.

Menuck says "I was with a group of people, and we had engagement with each other. We were figuring out how to engage with the world together. That was a big missing piece in my life, and none of it would have happened if I hadn't made this goofy little cassette."

== Reappearances ==
=== 2013 ===
In 2013, a Reddit user, who claimed to have purchased a copy of the tape in Moncton, New Brunswick, uploaded photographs of the cassette box and the last two songs on the A-side, "Random Luvly Moncton Blue(s)" and "Dadmomdaddy". The user's Reddit account was deleted shortly afterward, leading some news outlets to suggest the alleged rediscovery could be another hoax.

=== 2022 ===
On February 4, 2022, a 4chan user posted a Mega link to the entire album to /mu/, the site's music imageboard. The album was uploaded to YouTube shortly after. Constellation Records, the later label of Godspeed You! Black Emperor, initially declined to comment on the leaked audio.

On February 14, 2022, the band officially released the album on their Bandcamp page without prior announcement, confirming the authenticity of both the 2022 and 2013 leaks and clearing the mystery surrounding the album. The Bandcamp release described the album as a "retirement letter" which was recorded in mid-1993. The sole musician for most of the album was Menuck, with minor bass contributions from Pezzente and two guest musicians, Dano Leblanc on acoustic guitar and Menuck's then-partner (credited as "D.C.") on vocals on "$13.13". All proceeds from sales are to be donated to the Canadians for Justice and Peace in the Middle East's campaign to provide medical oxygen to the Gaza Strip.

Menuck was interviewed in a Kreative Kontrol podcast and stated that although he does not regret its re-release, the album is "not Godspeed":

"I don't feel like the cassette was a mistake, I don't feel embarrassed by it [...] If I was younger than I am [...], I would have just put it on SoundCloud. [...] I'm not confused about any of that, you know? It's just [that] you've brought up another point, which is it's not Godspeed, and it feels disrespectful to my friends who I've played music with for almost 30 years to be presenting this thing that was just me and a tiny room, you know?"

== Track listing ==
=== Cassette release ===
The original 1994 release consisted of 27 tracks split across two sides of a cassette.

Side A
No.	Title	Length
1.	"Drifting Intro Open"
2.	"Shot Thru Tubes"
3.	"Threethreethree"
4.	"When All the Furnaces Exploded"
5.	"Beep"
6.	"Hush"
7.	"Son of a Diplomat, Daughter of a Politician"
8.	"Glencairn 14"
9.	"$13.13"
10.	"Loose the Idiot Dogs"
11.	"Diminishing Shine"
12.	"Random Luvly Moncton Blue(s)"
13.	"Dadmomdaddy"

Side B
No.	Title	Length
14.	"333 Frames Per Second"
15.	"Revisionist Alternatif Wounds to the Hairkut Hit Head"
16.	"Ditty for Moya"
17.	"Buried Ton"
18.	"And the Hairy Guts Shine"
19.	"Hoarding"
20.	"Deterior 23"
21.	"All Angels Gone"
22.	"Deterior 17"
23.	"Deterior Three"
24.	"Devil's in the Church"
25.	"No Job"
26.	"Dress Like Shit"
27.	"Perfumed Pink Corpses from the Lips of Ms. Celine Dion"

=== Digital release ===
The 2022 digital release through Bandcamp consisted of 4 tracks each comprising a half of one of the original cassette sides.

No.	Title	Length
1.	"Side A1"	17:23
2.	"Side A2"	17:45
3.	"Side B1"	17:51
4.	"Side B2"	16:35
Total length:		69:34

== Personnel ==
- Efrim Menuck – vocals, all instruments
- Mauro Pezzente – bass
- "D.C." (Efrim's partner at the time) – vocals on "$13.13"
- Dano LeBlanc – acoustic guitar, "backwards hash"
