= Harris Newman =

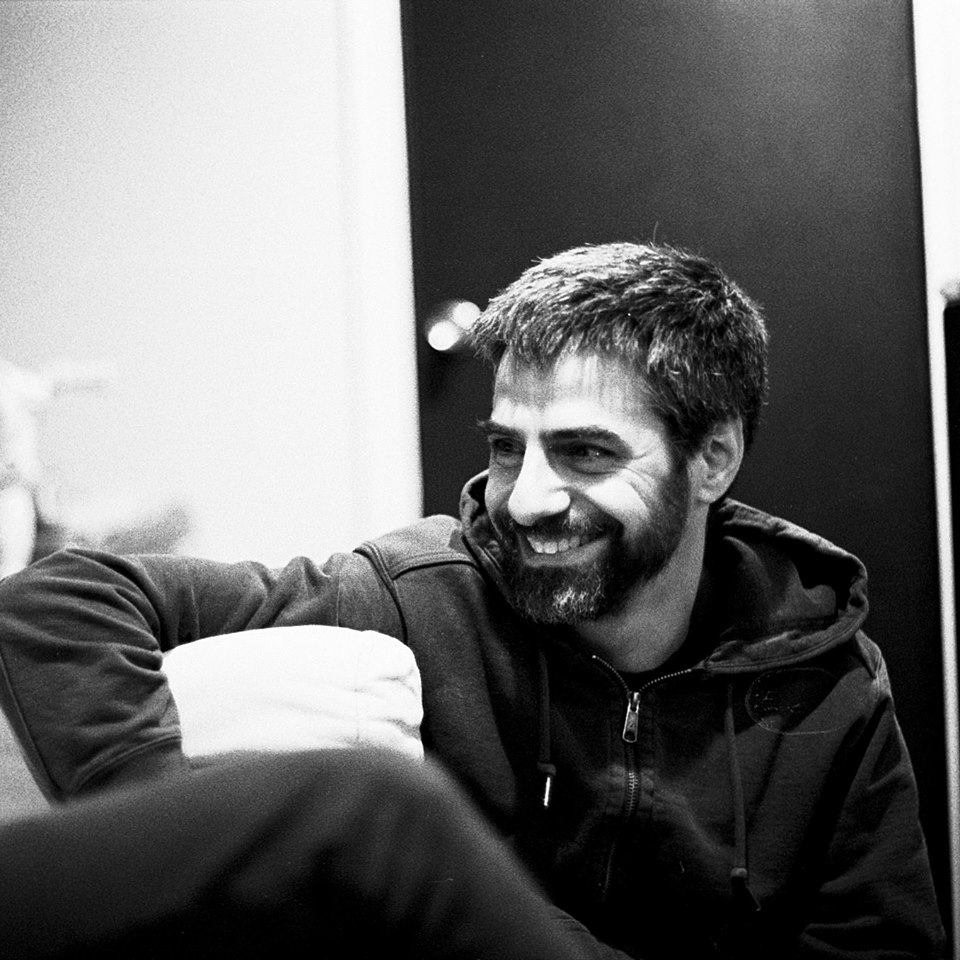

Background information
- Born
- Origin: Montreal, Quebec, Canada
- Genres: Experimental, American primitive guitar
- Occupation: mastering engineer
- Instruments: Guitar, bass guitar
- Years active: 1998–present
- Labels: Strange Attractors Audio House, Constellation, Mag Wheel, Madrona Records
- Website: harrisnewman.com

Harris Newman is a mastering engineer working out of Grey Market Mastering in Montreal, Quebec, Canada. His studio shares a building with the Hotel2Tango recording studio, as well as Constellation Records. Newman has mastered hundreds of albums since 1998, for artists including Wolf Parade, Frog Eyes, Thee Silver Mt. Zion Memorial Orchestra, Vic Chesnutt, Astral Swans, Carla Bozulich, BBQ, Les Sexareenos, Ravens & Chimes, Molasses, Think About Life, We Are Wolves, aKido, and Oiseaux-Tempête.

He is also a guitarist and bass player, and has recorded with Montreal groups Sackville, Hrsta, Triple Burner, Esmerine, Angela Desveaux, as well as his own acoustic guitar project, which has seen multiple release on Strange Attractors Audio House. His acoustic guitar style has been compared to John Fahey's output.

== Discography ==
Sources:

- Non-Sequiturs (2003)
- Accidents With Nature And Each Other (2005)
- Triple Burner (2006)
- Dark Was The Night (2006)
- Harris Newman / Mauro Antonio Pawlowski Split 12" (2008)
- Decorated (2008)
- Ignatz & Harris Newman Bring You Buzzard Meat (2009)

Compilation appearances

- Tunes On Toxic Terrain: WFMU Live From New Jersey (2004)
- Imaginational Anthem (2005)

== Sources ==
- Mastering studio website
- NPR All Songs Considered audio archive
- VPRO VPRO Zeldzaam Dwars session
- Maisonneuve magazine article
- Montreal Mirror interview
