= Mike Moya =

Canadian rock musician

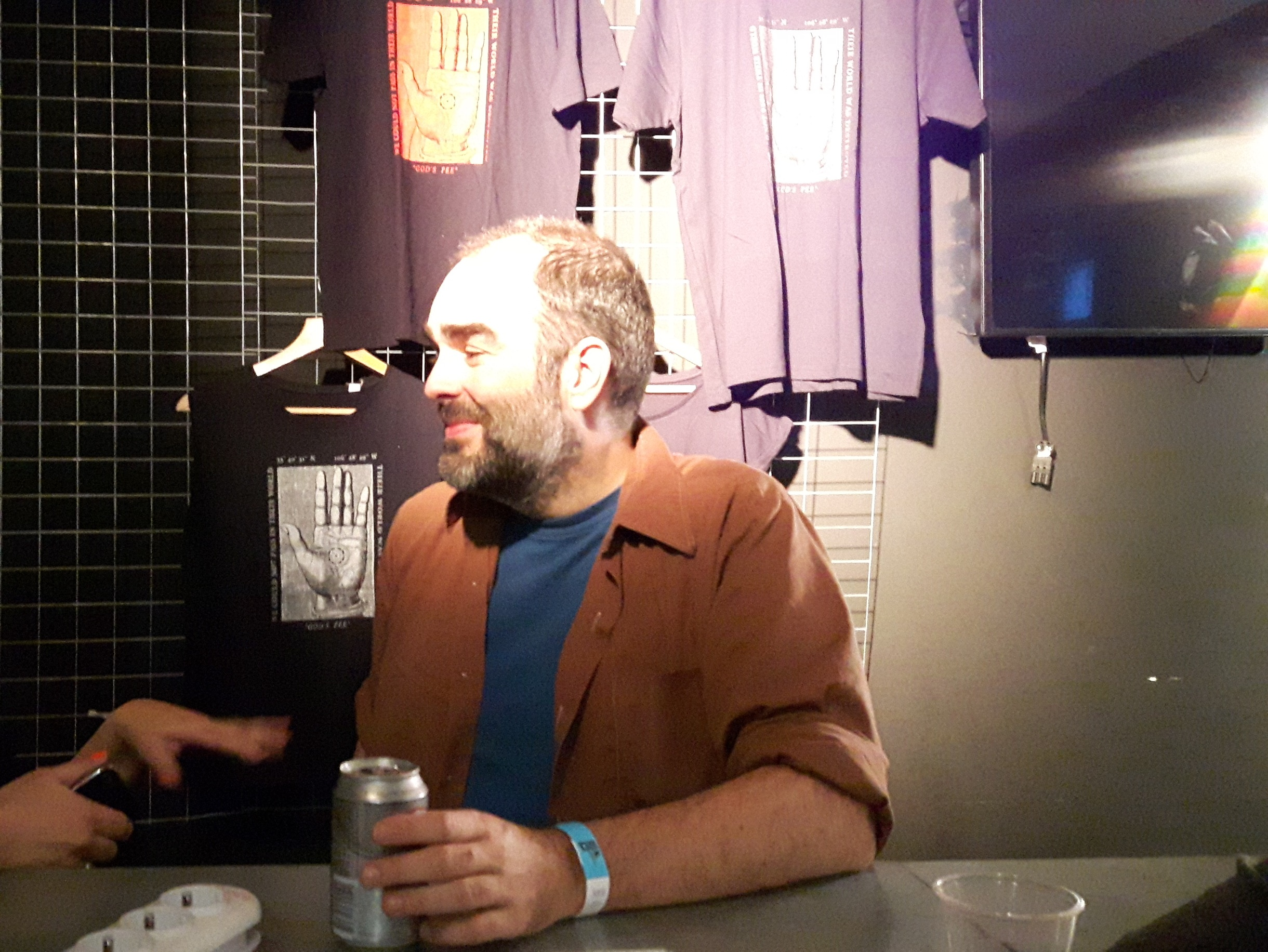
- Mike Moya (2016)

Background information
- Genre: Experimental rock
- Occupation: Musician
- Instruments: Guitar, vocals, piano, organ, tapes
- Years active: 1994–present
- Labels: Kranky, Constellation

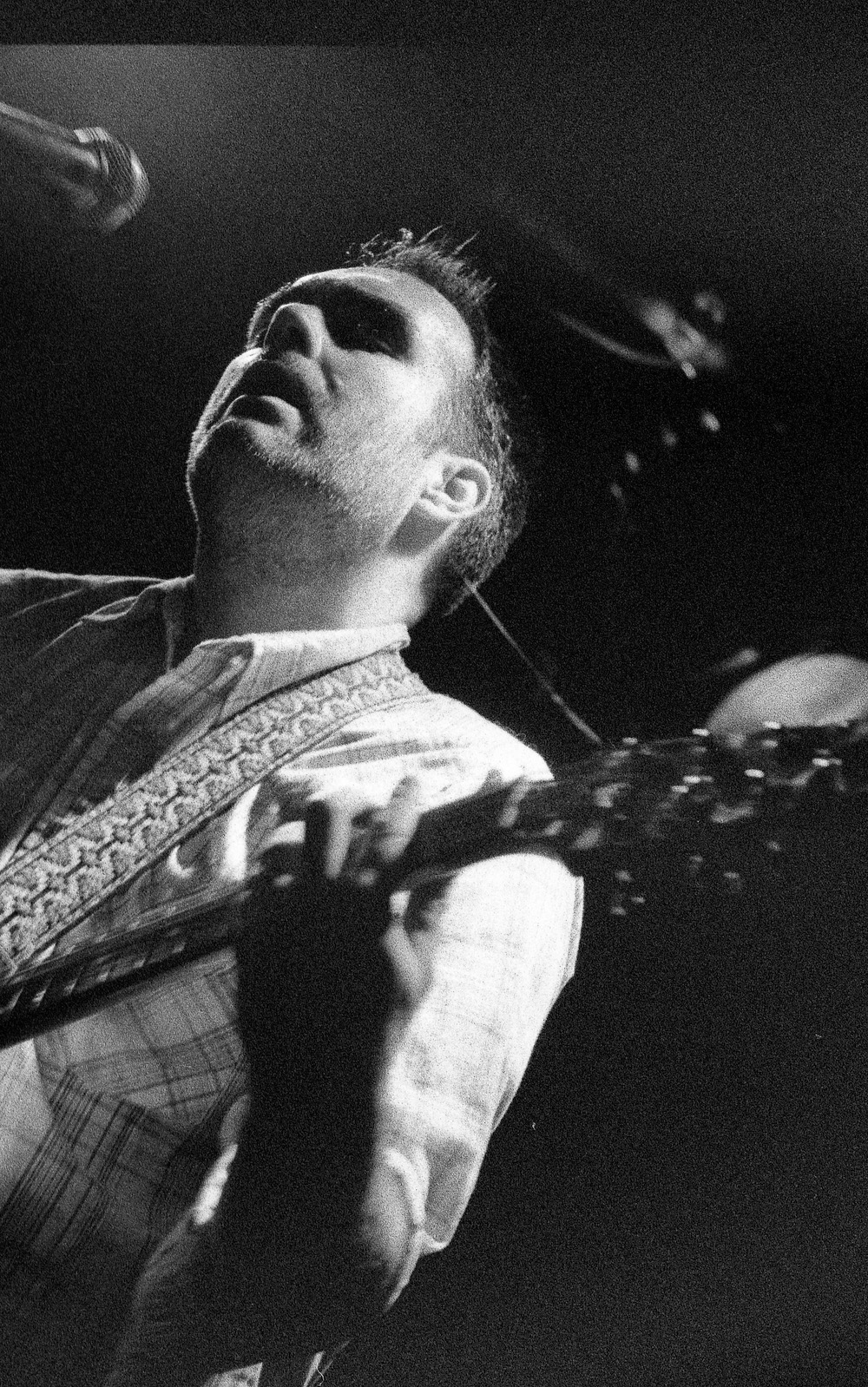
Mike Moya (2009)

Mike Moya (born December 1, 1969) is a Canadian rock musician, who is one of the founding members of post-rock band Godspeed You! Black Emperor. He left the band in 1998 to concentrate on his other bands Molasses, Set Fire to Flames and HṚṢṬA, but rejoined the band during their reunion in 2010. He was part of the live band of labelmate Elizabeth Anka Vajagic. He lives between Berlin and Montreal with his partner Maria Hinze and their family.

== Godspeed You! Black Emperor ==
Together with Efrim Menuck and Mauro Pezzente, Moya formed Godspeed You! Black Emperor in the early 1990s. He contributed guitar to the band's 1997 debut album F♯A♯∞ and their follow-up EP Slow Riot for New Zerø Kanada, but left the group in 1998, before the EP was released. Additionally, his vocals can be heard in the opening moments of the song "Antennas to Heaven," from the group's 2000 release Lift Your Skinny Fists Like Antennas to Heaven. Moya has been participating in the band's reunion.

== Other projects ==
After leaving GY!BE, Moya performed with a variety of other ensembles, including Molasses and Set Fire to Flames. He currently fronts the group HṚṢṬA.

== Discography ==
=== Godspeed You! Black Emperor ===
- All Lights Fucked on the Hairy Amp Drooling demo (1994)
- F♯ A♯ ∞ (1997, Constellation Records)
- aMAZEzine! 7" (1998, aMAZEzine!)
- Slow Riot for New Zerø Kanada EP (1999, Constellation)
- 'Allelujah! Don't Bend! Ascend! (2012, Constellation)
- Asunder, Sweet and Other Distress (2015, Constellation)
- Luciferian Towers (2017, Constellation)
- G_d's Pee at State's End! (2021, Constellation)
- No Title as of 13 February 2024 28,340 Dead (2024, Constellation)

=== Molasses ===
- You'll Never Be Well No More (1999)
- Trilogie: Toil & Peaceful Life (2000)
- A Slow Messe (2003)
- Trouble at Jinx Hotel (2004)

=== Set Fire to Flames ===
- Sings Reign Rebuilder (2001)
- Telegraphs in Negative/Mouths Trapped in Static (2003)

=== Esmerine ===
- Aurora (2005)

=== HṚṢṬA ===
- L'éclat du ciel était insoutenable (Album, 2001)
- Stem Stem in Electro (Album, 2005)
- Ghosts Will Come and Kiss Our Eyes (Album, 2007)

=== Angela Desveaux ===
- If I Ever Loved (2009)
