= Godspeed You! Black Emperor =

Canadian post-rock band

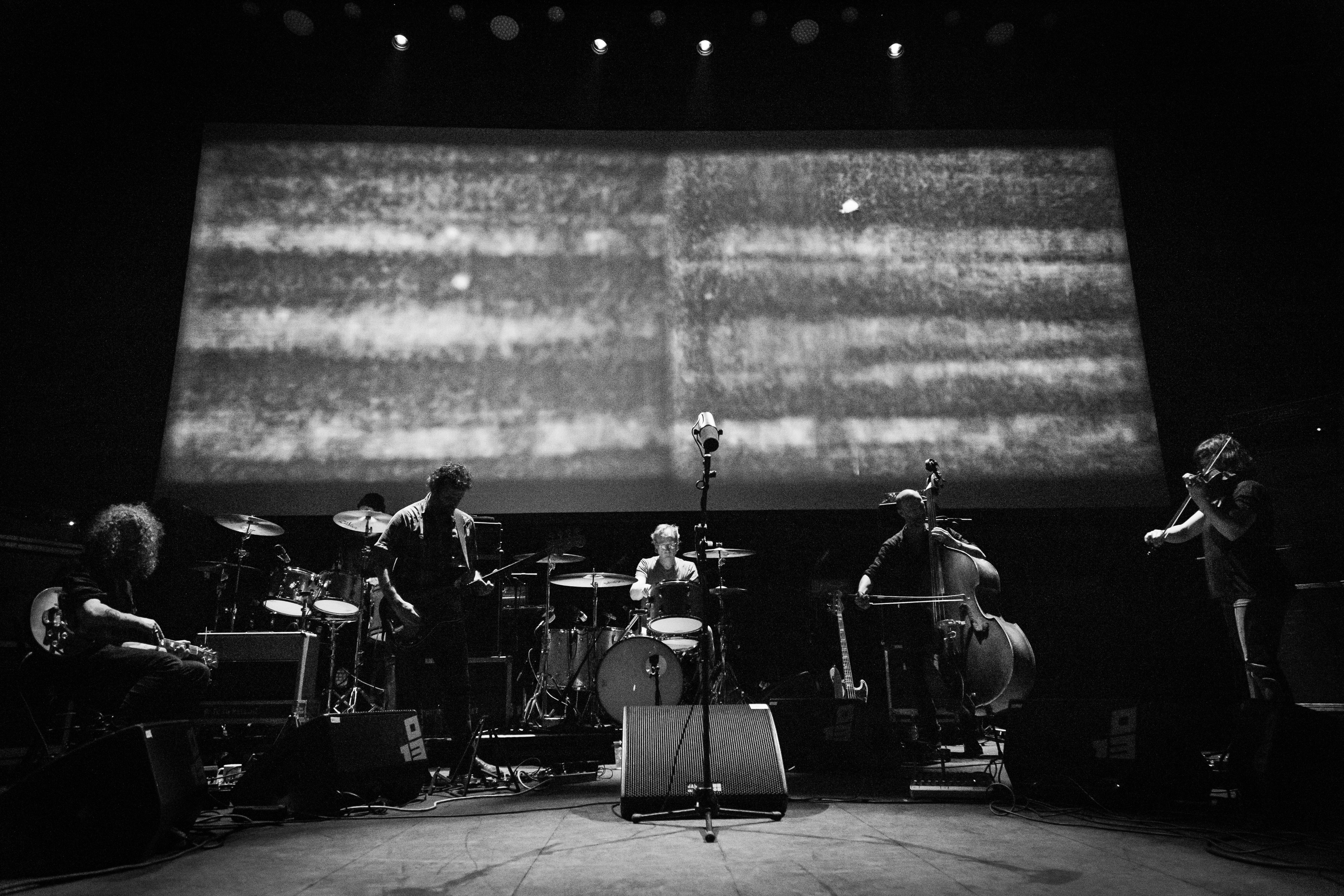
- Godspeed You! Black Emperor performing live at Roadburn Festival in 2018

Background information
- Also known as: Godspeed You Black Emperor!; Godspeed; GY!BE; God's Pee; Pee'd Emp'ror
- Origin: Montreal, Quebec, Canada
- Genre: Post-rock
- Works: Godspeed You! Black Emperor discography
- Years active: 1994–2003; 2010–present
- Labels: Constellation; Kranky
- Spinoffs: Thee Silver Mt. Zion Memorial Orchestra; Fly Pan Am; Hrsta; Esmerine; Set Fire to Flames
- Members: Efrim Menuck; Mauro Pezzente; Mike Moya; Sophie Trudeau; Thierry Amar; David Bryant; Karl Lemieux; Aidan Girt; Tim Herzog; Philippe Léonard
- Past members: Mark Littlefair; Thea Pratt; Bruce Cawdron; Norsola Johnson; Roger Tellier-Craig; Grayson Walker; Christophe Comte; Fluffy Erskine
- Website: brainwashed.com/godspeed/

Godspeed You! Black Emperor (sometimes shortened to GY!BE or Godspeed) is a Canadian post-rock collective founded in Montreal, Quebec in 1994. They release recordings through Constellation, a Montreal independent record label.

The group released their debut album F♯ A♯ ∞ in 1997 and toured regularly from 1998 to 2003. Their second album Lift Your Skinny Fists Like Antennas to Heaven (2000) received critical acclaim and has been named as one of the best albums of the decade. Then, following the release of Yanqui U.X.O. (2002), the band went on hiatus in 2003 to pursue other musical interests.

The band was rumored to have broken up, but reformed in 2010. Their first post-reunion album 'Allelujah! Don't Bend! Ascend! (2012) won the 2013 Polaris Music Prize. This was followed by Asunder, Sweet and Other Distress (2015), Luciferian Towers (2017), G_d's Pee at State's End! (2021) and No Title as of 13 February 2024 28,340 Dead (2024).

The band has a dedicated cult following and is renowned for their influence on the post-rock genre. Their music has been noted for its symphonic constructions, contrasts between ambient soundscapes and high-intensity crescendos; use of field recordings and spoken word monologues; and focus on dystopian, leftist, and anti-war themes. Members of the group have formed a number of side projects, including Thee Silver Mt. Zion Memorial Orchestra, Fly Pan Am, Hrsta, Esmerine, and Set Fire to Flames.

== History ==
=== First run (1994–2003) ===
Godspeed You! Black Emperor was formed in 1994 in Montreal, Quebec, by Efrim Menuck (guitar), Mike Moya (guitar), and Mauro Pezzente (bass). The band took its name from God Speed You! Black Emperor, a 1976 Japanese black-and-white documentary by director Mitsuo Yanagimachi, which follows the exploits of a Japanese biker gang, the Black Emperors. The band initially assembled after being offered a supporting act for another local band named Steak 72. Thereafter, the trio performed live on a few separate occasions. Previously, the name "God Speed You Black Emperor!" had been used by Menuck on a limited cassette entitled All Lights Fucked on the Hairy Amp Drooling that had been recorded the year prior, with limited contributions by Pezzente on bass, although it would not be until 1994 that the actual band formed.

The band expanded and continued to perform live. According to Menuck, joining the group was simple: "It was like if anyone knew anybody who played an instrument and seemed like an okay person, they would sort of join up." The group's number of members frequently changed during this time. Local musicians would often join the band for a handful of performances, then depart. The revolving door nature of the group's membership frequently caused it strain before the release of F♯ A♯ ∞. After that release, the group stabilized around a nine-person lineup with Menuck, Moya and David Bryant on guitars, Pezzente and Thierry Amar on bass guitars, Aidan Girt and Bruce Cawdron on drums, and Sophie Trudeau and Norsola Johnson on violin and cello respectively. Moya would depart in 1998 to focus on HṚṢṬA, being replaced by Roger Tellier-Craig of Fly Pan Am. Tellier-Craig left in 2004 to devote more time to Fly Pan Am. In 2002, the band released their third album Yanqui U.X.O., which was recorded in Chicago and engineered by Steve Albini.

The group was once misconstrued as being a band of terrorists. After stopping at a local gas station for fuel in the town of Ardmore, Oklahoma, during their 2003 tour of the United States, the station attendant working that day believed the group of Canadians to be terrorists. She quickly passed a note to another customer asking them to call the police. When the local police appeared, the group was held until it could be questioned by the FBI. Although the police were suspicious of the band's anti-government documents and some photos it had (such as those of oil rigs), they found no incriminating evidence. After background checks were run, the ensemble was released from custody and continued on its way to its next show in Saint Louis. Efrim Menuck later spoke to the crowd during their appearance in Missouri about what happened to them and speculated that their origin was a motive for being released quickly ("It's a good thing we're nice white kids from Canada"). The incident was mentioned in Michael Moore's book Dude, Where's My Country?.

In July 2003, Constellation Records posted a note on their website reading: "godspeed will be on hiatus for the better part of a year, while the band members work on their many other projects".

=== Reunion (2010–present) ===
On April 9, 2010, the band announced it was reuniting for an All Tomorrow's Parties music event in the UK as well as further US dates. "after a decade's retreat, godspeed has decided to roll again", read the statement. Mike Moya re-joined the band for the reunion, while original cellist Norsola Johnson declined to participate. The band played a full North American and European tour in 2011, and more dates in the UK including an appearance at the ATP 'I'll Be Your Mirror' music festival in London.

The following year, the band appeared at the Pitchfork Music Festival in Chicago, Coachella in California, and the All Tomorrow's Parties I'll Be Your Mirror festival in New York. Drummer Timothy Herzog began touring with the band after the departure of Bruce Cawdron.

"3 quick bullet-points that almost anybody could agree on maybe=

-holding a gala during a time of austerity and normalized decline is a weird thing to do.

-organizing a gala just so musicians can compete against each other for a novelty-sized cheque doesn’t serve the cause of righteous music at all.

-asking the toyota motor company to help cover the tab for that gala, during a summer where the melting northern ice caps are live-streaming on the internet, IS FUCKING INSANE, and comes across as tone-deaf to the current horrifying malaise."

— Godspeed You! Black Emperor, in response to winning the 2013 Polaris Music Prize

In 2013, the band won the Polaris Music Prize for their fourth album 'Allelujah! Don't Bend! Ascend!, but it criticized the cost of the ceremony during the time of austerity, stating, "Maybe the next celebration should happen in a cruddier hall, without the corporate banners and culture overlords." The band's fifth album Asunder, Sweet and Other Distress was released on March 31, 2015, and the sixth album Luciferian Towers came out on September 22, 2017.

In August 2019, the band played new songs tentatively titled "Glaciers" and "Cliff". They would appear on the band's seventh album G_d's Pee at State's End!, which was released on April 2, 2021.

In February 2022, a copy of All Lights Fucked on the Hairy Amp Drooling was posted to 4chan's music board, /mu/. The band eventually uploaded the full audio of the tape to its official Bandcamp page on February 14.

On February 24, 2024, the band debuted three new untitled songs at the Knockdown Center in New York City. On August 28, 2024, the band announced its eighth album, No Title as of 13 February 2024 28,340 Dead, supported by the lead single "Grey Rubble – Green Shoots". Its title references the death toll of Palestinians in the Gaza Strip during the Gaza war at the time of the album's conception.

In August 2025, the band removed most of their discography from major streaming services, including Spotify, Tidal, and Deezer. Their two albums released through Kranky—F♯ A♯ ∞ (1998) and Lift Your Skinny Fists Like Antennas to Heaven (2000)—remained temporarily available on Apple Music but were scheduled for removal. A representative for Kranky stated that the label allows artists to determine how their music is distributed. The band's catalog continued to be available for purchase and streaming through Bandcamp. The decision followed similar actions taken by Deerhoof, Xiu Xiu, and King Gizzard & the Lizard Wizard, who had withdrawn their music from Spotify earlier in 2025. Those groups cited concerns regarding investments made by Spotify chief executive officer Daniel Ek through his fund Prima Materia, which has financed Helsing, a defense company developing artificial intelligence software for military applications. However, the reason for their discography being pulled from streaming remains unclear, as Godspeed You! Black Emperor or Constellation have not commented on the situation.

=== Musical style ===
Godspeed You! Black Emperor, since its inception, has been lauded as trailblazers of the post-rock genre. However, members have largely disavowed this categorization over the years.

== Live concerts ==
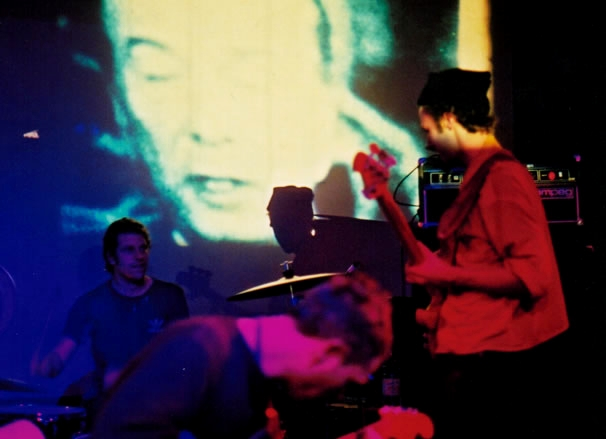
The band performing in London in 2000

Film loop projections are an important aspect of the group's live performances, explained by Efrim Menuck as "[putting] the whole into context".

The band is taper-friendly; they allow audience members to record their live performances, and fans often release new material before the band makes an official recording. Since 2003, over 800 recordings of their live shows have been uploaded to the Internet Archive, with the permission of Constellation Records on behalf of the band.

The band toured Australia and New Zealand for the first time in February 2013, including a performance at the All Tomorrow's Parties I'll Be Your Mirror festival in Melbourne. They toured China for the first time in April 2013, giving performances in Shanghai and Beijing, and revisited China in March 2016.

The band supported Nine Inch Nails on its Tension tour in October 2013.

In 2015 and 2016, the band performed numerous concert and festival shows around the world. Two new songs were previewed in many of the shows picking up the fan titles "Buildings" and "Railroads" from the projections that accompanied them. The band also lent live performances of their songs to a revival of the 2005 work "monumental" by Canadian dance troupe Holy Body Tattoo in 2016.

The band toured in ten countries across Europe and North America in 2024 and 2025.

They announced their first concert in South America on June 18, 2026, where they will be playing for audiences in Argentina, Brazil and Chile.

== Politics ==
The Guardian wrote that Godspeed You! Black Emperor "don't simply espouse anti-capitalism but embody it, rejecting the selfish individualism at its core", pointing out how the band's operation as a collective challenges traditional notions of hierarchy. In a 2012 interview, Menuck said, "All music is political, right? You either make music that pleases the king and his court, or you make music for the serfs outside the walls ... We started making this noise together when we were young and broke. Whatever politics we had were born out of living through a time when the dominant narrative was that everything was fine." Several of its songs also incorporate voice samples which express political sentiments, most notably "The Dead Flag Blues" (on F♯ A♯ ∞) and "BBF3" (on Slow Riot for New Zerø Kanada).

In 2014, Menuck identified himself as an anarchist. This perspective has influenced the band's political activism. The back cover of Yanqui U.X.O. depicts the relationships of several major record labels to the military–industrial complex. The liner notes of 'Allelujah! Don't Bend! Ascend! criticize anti-environmentalist economic development and student protest suppression.

Menuck is a vocal critic of Israeli policy towards Palestinians. The liner notes to Yanqui U.X.O. (2002) describe the song "09-15-00" as "Ariel Sharon surrounded by 1,000 Israeli soldiers marching on al-Haram Ash-Sharif & provoking another Intifada". The title of No Title as of 13 February 2024 28,340 Dead references the death toll of Palestinians in the Gaza Strip during the Gaza war at the time of the album's conception. In 2021, the band joined more than 600 other musicians in pledging to boycott Israel until it ends its occupation of Palestinian territories.

== Band members ==
Current

- Efrim Menuck – guitar, tape loops, keyboards (1994–2003, 2010–present)
- Mauro Pezzente – bass guitar (1994–2003, 2010–present)
- Mike Moya – guitar (1994–1998, 2010–present)
- Thierry Amar – double bass, bass guitar (1997–2003, 2010–present)
- David Bryant – guitar, tape loops, synthesizer (1997–2003, 2010–present)
- Aidan Girt – drums, percussion (1997–2003, 2010–present)
- Sophie Trudeau – violin (1997–2003, 2010–present)
- Karl Lemieux – film projections (2010–present)
- Timothy Herzog – drums, percussion (2012–present)
- Philippe Léonard – film projections (2015–present)

Former

- Thea Pratt – French horn (1995–1997)
- Dano LeBlanc – drums (1995; died 2023)
- Jesse Pratt – violin (before 1997)
- Bruce Cawdron – drums, percussion (1997–2003, 2010–2012)
- Norsola Johnson – cello (1997–2003)
- Grayson Walker – accordion (1997)
- Christophe Comte – violin (1997; died 2023)
- Roger Tellier-Craig – guitar (1998–2003)
- Flux Lux (Ken Doolittle, Debby Salvador) – film projections (1996–1997)
- Lee Schnaiberg – film projections (1997–1998)
- Mark Littlefair – film projections (1998–2000)
- Jean-Sébastian Truchy – film projections (2000-2002)
- Fluffy Erskine – film projections (2003)

Timeline

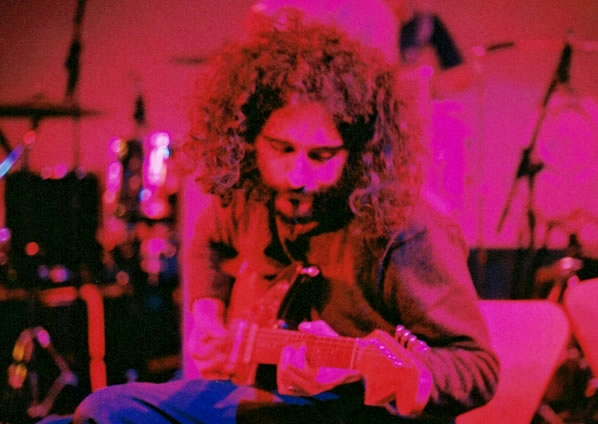
Efrim Menuck

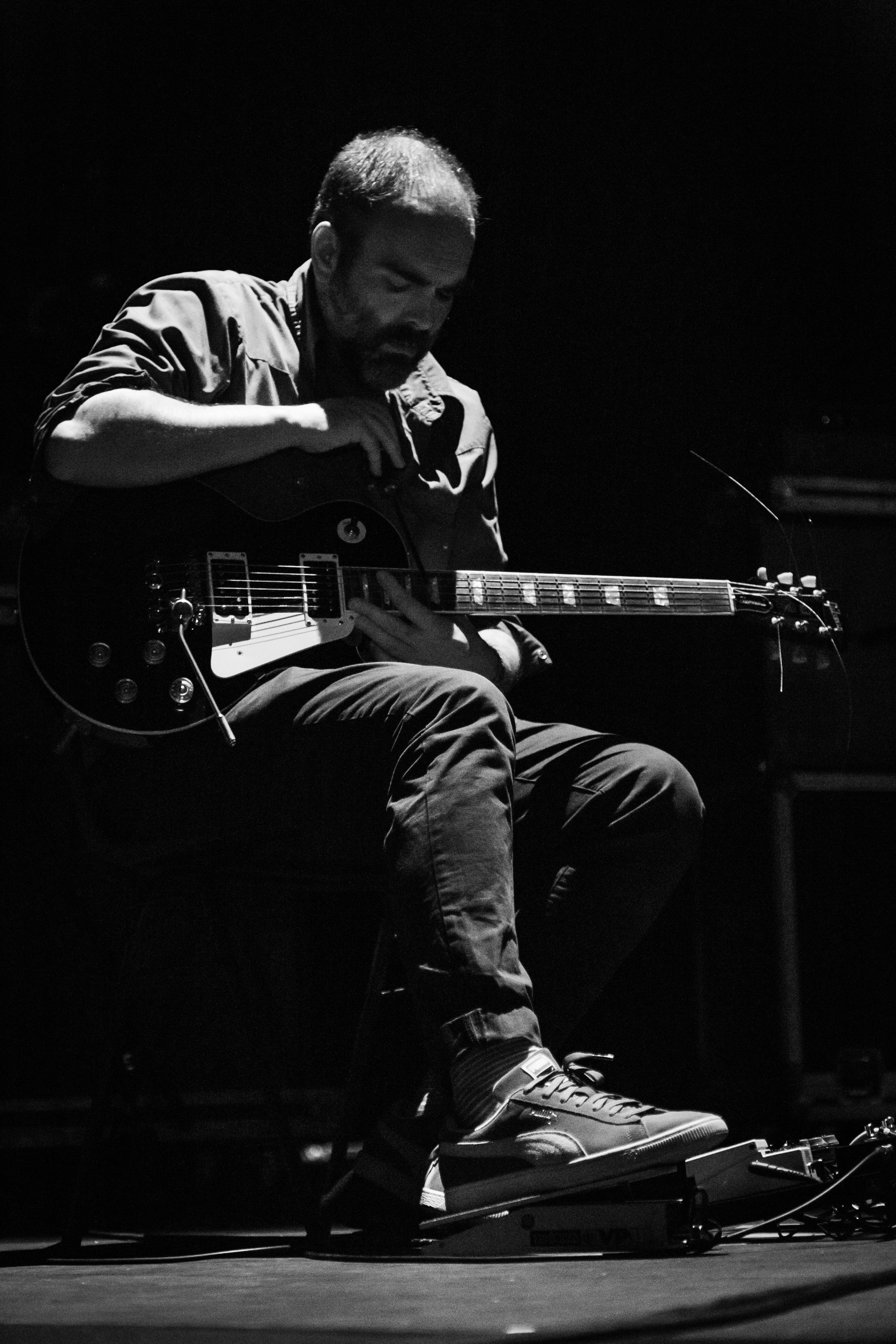
Mike Moya

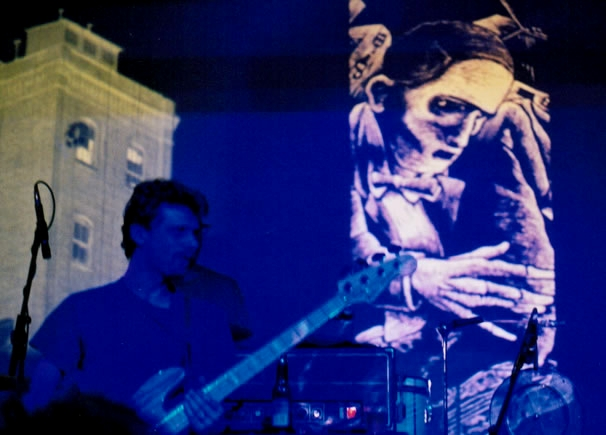
Mauro Pezzente

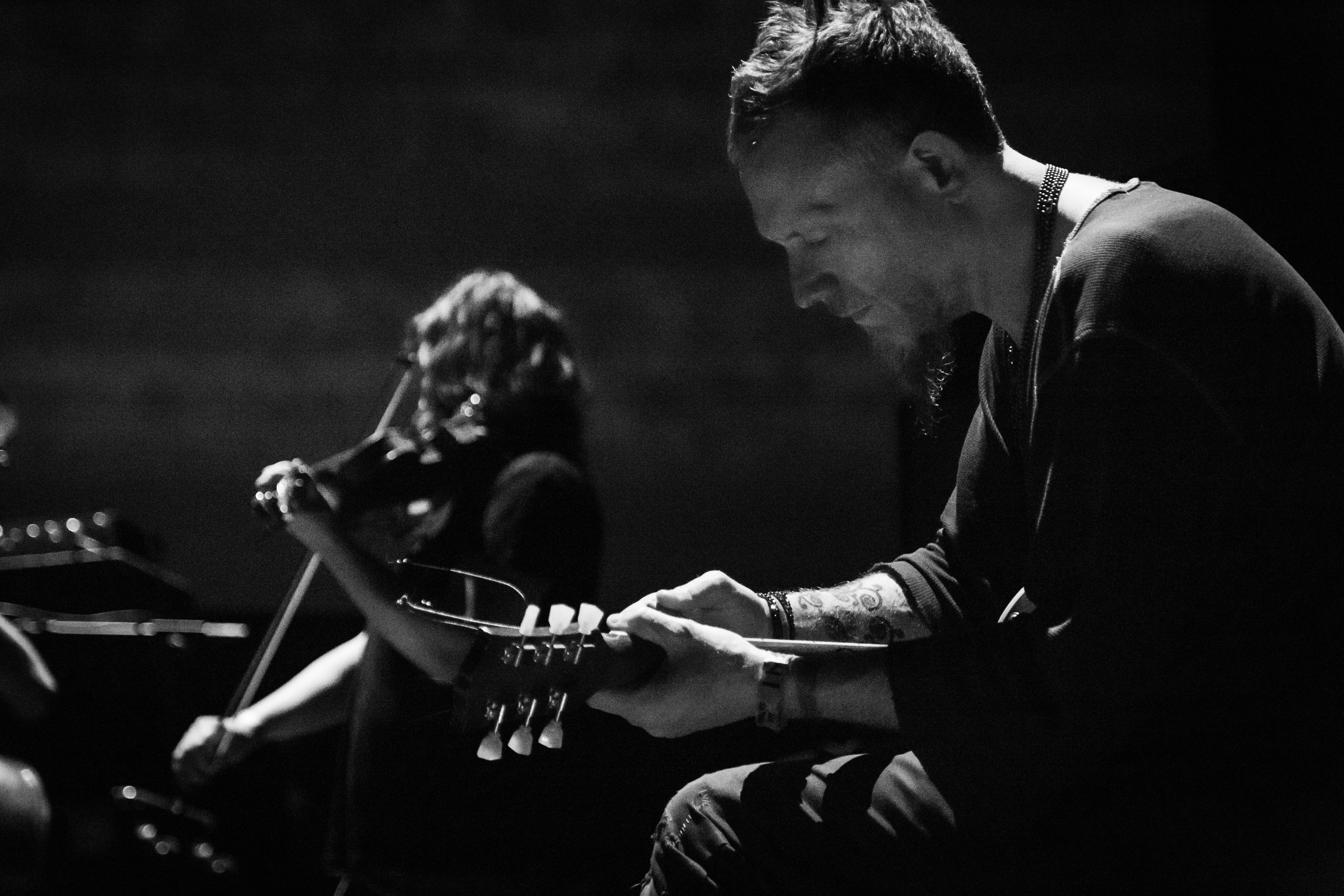
David Bryant

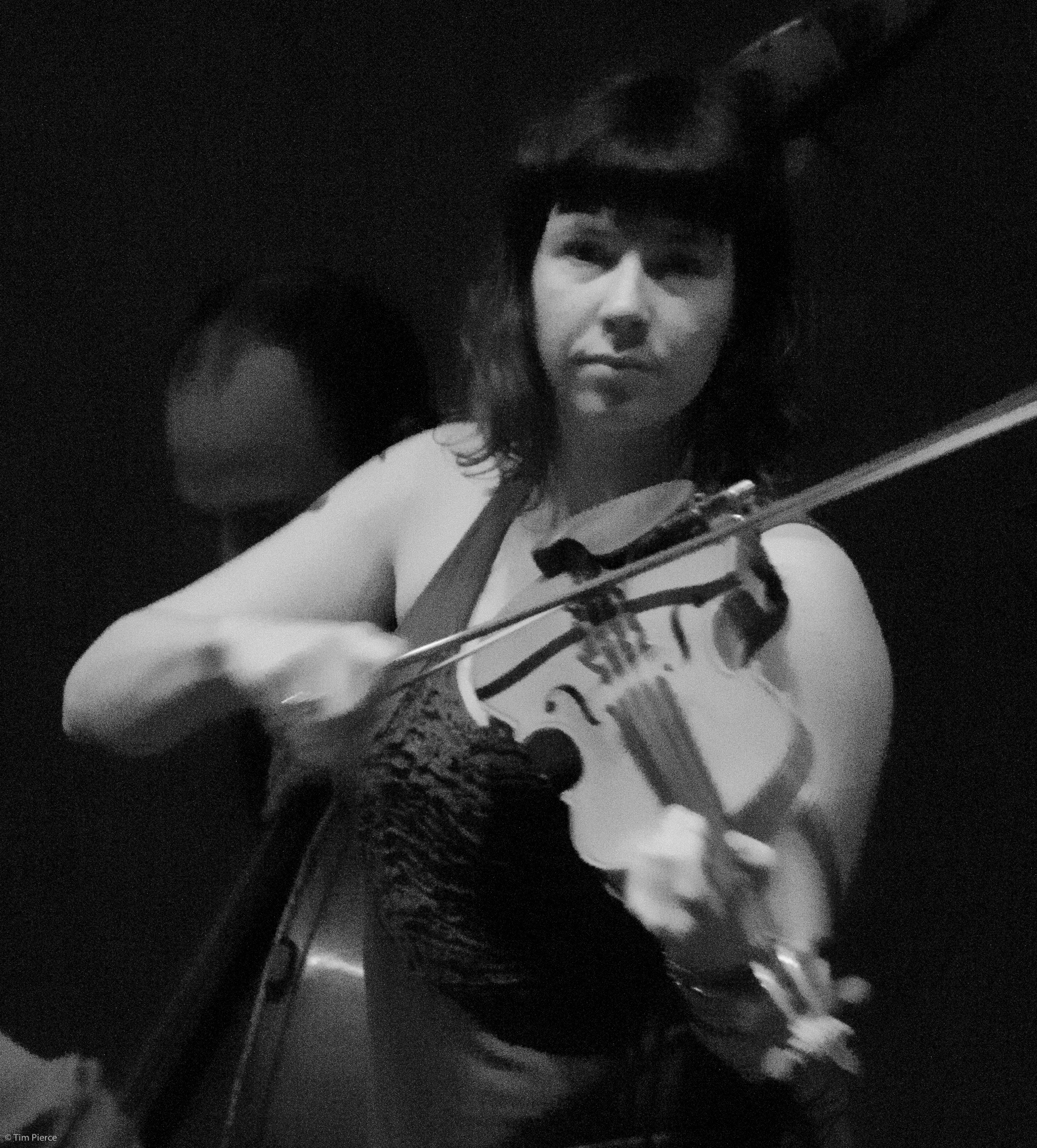
Sophie Trudeau

== Discography ==
Studio albums

- F♯ A♯ ∞ (1997)
- Lift Your Skinny Fists like Antennas to Heaven (2000)
- Yanqui U.X.O. (2002)
- 'Allelujah! Don't Bend! Ascend! (2012)
- Asunder, Sweet and Other Distress (2015)
- Luciferian Towers (2017)
- G_d's Pee at State's End! (2021)
- "No Title As of 13 February 2024 28,340 Dead" (2024)
