= Aidan Girt =

- Also known as: 1-Speed Bike, Bottleskup Flenkenkenmike, OSB
- Genres: Post-rock, instrumental rock, electronica, experimental rock
- Occupation: Musician
- Instruments: Drum kit, Percussion
- Years active: 1996–Present
- Labels: Kranky, Constellation, Broklyn Beats
- Member of: Godspeed You! Black Emperor; Some Became Hollow Tubes
- Formerly of: Exhaust; A Silver Mt. Zion

Aidan Girt is a Canadian drummer for the Montreal-based post-rock collectives Godspeed You! Black Emperor and Exhaust. He is also a solo electronic artist under the names OSB, 1-Speed Bike, and Bottleskup Flenkenkenmike and continues to record (with others) in Some Became Hollow Tubes.

== Career ==
In 1994, Girt co-founded Godspeed You! Black Emperor.

Girt, along with Gordon Krieger and Mike Zabitsky, formed the group Exhaust; they performed in Montreal for a short time and released a single in 1996. In 1998, the three released a self-titled album and, in 2001, a studio album, Enregistreur.

Girt played drums as a guest musician on the debut album of A Silver Mt. Zion in 2000.

As 1-Speed Bike, Girt released a number of solo albums and EPs, including El Gallito in 2004.

In 2019, Girt began releasing music as a duo with guitarist Eric Quach under the name Some Became Hollow Tubes.

== Discography ==
=== Godspeed You! Black Emperor ===
- F♯A♯∞ (Constellation Records, 1997)
- Slow Riot for New Zero Kanada (Constellation Records, 1999)
- Lift Your Skinny Fists Like Antennas to Heaven (Constellation Records, 2000)
- Yanqui U.X.O. (Constellation Records, 2002)
- 'Allelujah! Don't Bend! Ascend! (Constellation Records, 2012)
- Asunder, Sweet and Other Distress (Constellation Records, 2015)
- Luciferian Towers (Constellation Records, 2017)
- G_d's Pee at State's End! (Constellation Records, 2021)
- No Title as of 13 February 2024 28,340 Dead (Constellation Records, 2024)

=== Exhaust ===
- 230596 7" cassette (self-released, 1996)
- Exhaust (Constellation Records, 1998)
- Enregistreur (Constellation Records, 2002)
- Grenadilla Splinters (self-released, 2011)

=== A Silver Mt. Zion ===
- He Has Left Us Alone but Shafts of Light Sometimes Grace the Corner of Our Rooms... (Constellation Records, 2000)

=== 1-Speed Bike ===
- Droopy Butt Begone! (Constellation Records, 2000)
- I'm a Pretzel on a Stealth Mission to Kill the President (Broklyn Beats, 2002)
- Limp Penis (self-released, 2003)
- El Gallito (Broklyn Beats, 2004)
- Klootzak Keizer (Broklyn Beats, 2005)
- Someone Told Me Life Gets Easier in Your 50s (Broklyn Beats, 2005)
- A Swimmer in the Ocean Is Not Afraid of the Rain (Bully Records, 2006)
- Pashto Translator Needed (self-released, 2010)
- This Country is Torture (Bad Panda Records, 2011)
- Robbery (self-released, 2013)

=== Bottleskup Flenkenkenmike ===
- Untitled 12" (Toolbox, 2002)
- Looks Like Velvet, Smells Like Pee (Broklyn Beats, 2002)

=== Some Became Hollow Tubes ===
- In 1988 I Thought This Shit Would Never Change (self-released, 2019)
- Keep it in the Ground (Gizeh Records, 2019)
