= Mauro Pezzente =

Canadian musician

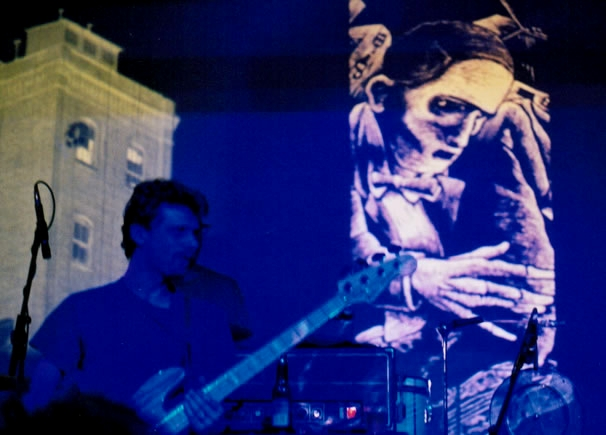

Background information
- Born: Canada
- Genres: Experimental rock, post-rock
- Occupation: Musician
- Years active: 1994–present
- Labels: Kranky; Constellation

Mauro Pezzente is a Canadian musician. He is best known as being co-founder of Godspeed You! Black Emperor.

Pezzente, along with Efrim Menuck and Mike Moya, founded Godspeed You! Black Emperor in 1994. Along with Thierry Amar, Pezzente plays the bass guitar for the band.

Pezzente was the first to live and perform within the Hotel2Tango. Christening it the Gallery Quiva, Pezzente and his partner Kiva Stimac played infrequent shows there until exhaust and carbon monoxide from the garage below the loft caused them to move out. Efrim Menuck soon moved in and renamed it.

Pezzente and his partner, Kiva Stimac, opened the Montreal venue Casa del popolo in 2000.

== Maica Mia ==
Along with guitarist and vocalist Maica Armata (née Armata-Machnik) and her partner Jonny Paradise, Pezzente has played with the Montreal band Maica Mia.

== Discography ==
=== Godspeed You! Black Emperor ===
- F♯A♯∞ (Constellation Records, 1997)
- Slow Riot for New Zero Kanada (Constellation Records, 1999)
- Lift Your Skinny Fists Like Antennas to Heaven (Constellation Records, 2000)
- Yanqui U.X.O. (Constellation Records, 2002)
- 'Allelujah! Don't Bend! Ascend! (Constellation Records, 2012)
- Asunder, Sweet and Other Distress (Constellation Records, 2015)
- Luciferian Towers (Constellation Records, 2017)
- G_d's Pee at State's End! (Constellation Records, 2021)
- No Title as of 13 February 2024 28,340 Dead (Constellation Records, 2024)

=== Maica Mia ===
- Des Era (2014)
