= F♯ A♯ ∞ =

1997 studio album by Godspeed You! Black Emperor

- One of the three different LP album covers

Studio album by Godspeed You! Black Emperor
- Released: August 14, 1997; June 8, 1998 (CD reissue)
- Recorded: May 1997
- Studio: Hotel2Tango (Montreal)
- Genre: Post-rock
- Length: 38:22 / ∞ (LP); 63:29 (CD)
- Label: Constellation; Kranky (1998 CD reissue); CST003; krank 027
- Producer: Don Wilkie; Ian Ilavsky; Godspeed You! Black Emperor

Godspeed You! Black Emperor chronology
All Lights Fucked on the Hairy Amp Drooling (1994)	F♯ A♯ ∞ (1997)	Slow Riot for New Zero Kanada E.P. (1999)

Alternative cover
- 1998 CD version

F♯ A♯ ∞ (pronounced "F-sharp, A-sharp, Infinity") is the debut studio album by Canadian post-rock band Godspeed You! Black Emperor. It was first released on August 14, 1997, through Constellation Records on a single LP and on June 8, 1998, through Kranky on CD. The CD version and the LP version have substantial differences between them. Recorded at the Hotel2Tango in the Mile End of Montreal, the album, as became common for the band, is devoid of traditional lyrics and is mostly instrumental, featuring lengthy songs segmented into movements. It was initially released in limited quantities and distributed through live performances, developing a cult following via word of mouth.

== Background ==
In 1995, Mauro Pezzente moved into a loft with his then-girlfriend in Mile End, Montreal. Pezzente used the flat as a performance venue, dubbing it the Gallery Quiva. Around 1996, fumes from the mechanic's garage below the loft forced them to vacate it. Shortly after their departure, Efrim Menuck moved into the space and established Hotel2Tango, serving both as a recording studio and practice space. There, in 1997, the original recording of F♯ A♯ ∞ took place. By this time, the band had reached an unwieldy 15 members. In preparation of the album, they trimmed their numbers to ten.

The culmination of material spanning back to 1993 resulted in two lengthy songs, each about 20 minutes in length. After the record's release, the band became interested in touring the United States. In order to make headway, they sent a copy of their album to the Chicago-based record label Kranky. Impressed by the recording, Kranky offered to re-release the album on compact disc. The re-worked version of the album included several new sections, resulting in three movements and slightly over an hour of music, nearly doubling the previous runtime. This new version was released in June 1998.

== Music ==
Each track features field recordings and sampled sounds, once referred to by David Keenan of The Wire as "eschatological tape loops". The overall theme of the album is often pinned as apocalyptic. Indeed, English director Danny Boyle was heavily inspired by the album during the making of 28 Days Later. During an interview with The Guardian, he explained, "I always try to have a soundtrack in my mind [when creating a film]. Like when we did Trainspotting, it was Underworld. For me, the soundtrack to 28 Days Later was Godspeed. The whole film was cut to Godspeed in my head."

The CD version and the LP version have substantial differences between them. Note that the following track descriptions describe the tracks of the CD version and will not accurately reflect the music of the LP version.

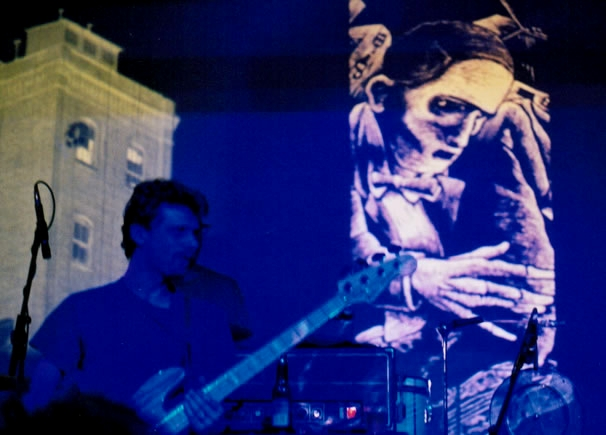
Co-founder and bassist Mauro Pezzente performing with Godspeed You! Black Emperor in London, England in November 2000

The opening track, "The Dead Flag Blues", begins with an ominous spoken word introduction, which originates from an unfinished screenplay by guitarist Efrim Menuck. Backed by a string melody, the speaker describes a derelict city, where the government is corrupt and the inhabitants are drunks. The introduction is followed by the sounds of a train and high-volume suspended noise. This eventually develops into a Western-themed melody, and is capped off by an upbeat section which includes glockenspiel, violin, and slide guitar.

The second track, "East Hastings", is named after East Hastings Street in Vancouver's blighted Downtown Eastside. It begins with bagpipes reprising the theme of "The Dead Flag Blues" and backing the shouts of a street preacher. The sermon slowly quiets, and is replaced with the movement "The Sad Mafioso...", an edited version of which appeared in the film 28 Days Later. The movement also contains a brief portion where the band quietly sings in a rare occurrence of vocals.^{[α]} The track concludes with a series of electronic noises and buzzing until throbbing bass takes over.

The final track, "Providence", is considerably longer than the first two, coming in at 29 minutes in length, though with 3 minutes and 30 seconds of complete silence. James Oldham of NME described it as "part The Good, the Bad and the Ugly and part Spiritualized drone freakout". The introduction features a vox pop interviewee by the name of "Blaise Bailey Finnegan III", who references "A Country Boy Can Survive" by Hank Williams Jr.^{[β]} The speaker is quickly replaced with a cello piece accompanied by glockenspiel, violin, and horn. Percussion is added to the melody which peaks, and is continued by a sample of Hazel Dickens singing "Gathering Storm", written by Mason Daring for the film Matewan. A quasi-military movement titled, "Kicking Horse on Broken Hill", follows, and is eventually taken over by the sung phrase "Where are you going? Where are you going?" The voice is sampled from the song "By My Side", from the 1970 musical Godspell. A collage of sounds and drones then round off the track. After a period of silence, a brief coda named for the American musician John Lee Hooker is performed.

== Packaging ==
The record and its many inserts laid out, including the crushed penny. The hand drawn picture by Efrim Menuck is visible between the handbill and envelope.

The title of the album is pronounced "F-sharp, A-sharp, Infinity". This is a reference to the tuning of the guitars used by the band and to the loop at the end. The compact disc version does not contain the loop.

The original five-hundred records' jackets were handmade by the band, their record label, and local Montreal artists. One of three original photographs—depicting a watertower, train, or road sign—was glued onto the cover. The sleeve and jacket made no mention of the track titles. They were instead scratched into the run-off groove of the record, accompanied by the catalog number and side indication.

Inside of the jacket was an envelope filled with inserts. The contents included an old handbill, the album's credit sheet, a picture drawn by guitarist Efrim Menuck, and a Canadian penny crushed by a train. A silk-screened image dedicated to the blues musician Reverend Gary Davis was also included in the jacket. Barb Stewart of Stylus Magazine and Mike Galloway of NOW called the packaging and inserts "beautiful". After numerous re-pressings, the assembly process was streamlined. However, the record still ships, to this day, with virtually the same packaging elements as the originals. Modern pressings include a United States penny rather than a Canadian one, as Canadian pennies are no longer minted.

The compact disc version of the album is much simpler artistically. Guitarist David Bryant once referred to the packaging as a "jewel-cased CD monstrosity", preferring the original handcrafted record. The photograph of a road sign was chosen as the cover image, and was enlarged and darkened significantly from the original. Inside of the case are liner notes and images, including the "Faulty Schematics of a Ruined Machine", the hand drawn picture by Efrim Menuck present in the record.

== Reception ==
Professional ratings
Review scores
Source	Rating
AllMusic	3/5 stars
Encyclopedia of Popular Music	4/5 stars
The Great Rock Discography	9/10
NME	8/10
OndaRock	7/10
Pitchfork	9.3/10 (1998); 9.5/10 (2020)
Sputnikmusic	5/5
Tom Hull	B+

Originally, the band had planned to self-release the album as a double 7-inch record set. The idea was scrapped after Don Wilkie and Ian Ilavsky, founders of the independent record label Constellation and co-producers of the album, offered to release it as their third record. The album was released in August 1997, and was initially limited to five-hundred hand-packaged and numbered LPs. The first release of F♯ A♯ ∞ was reviewed by a scant number of critics. Stylus Magazine wrote that the record was "innovative and inventive" and that it "stakes out unique territory in a world overrun with hackneyed experimentation". Gordon Krieger of Exclaim! described it as a "slow soundtrack of regret and desire, equal parts morose and expectant". Montreal-based Hour magazine said the lengthy tracks "could be really pretentious but the sounds [the band] make are way too cool to be merely coldly superior". Chart Attack magazine went on to rank the two-track record as #46 on their list of the top 50 Canadian albums of all time.

Reviews of the second release were generally positive and more widespread. The album placed fourth in The Wire's 1998 critics' poll. Marc Gilman of AllMusic said that "the music on [the] album is unique and powerful" and that someone "would be hard-pressed to find any imitators of [Godspeed's] revolutionary musical form". Magnet commented that the three tracks can be "served up as staggering psychedelia for a headphone or surround-sound context", voting it number 38 on their list of the best albums from 1993 to 2003. The NME called it a "genuine classic", noting the variety of sounds present in the album. Pitchfork founder and critic Ryan Schreiber remarked that, of the many experimental bands around, Godspeed You! Black Emperor were "one of the few that [haven't] left out beauty and emotion in their pieces". Pitchfork later ranked the album number 45 on their list of the top 100 albums of the 1990s.

== Track listing ==
LP release
No.	Title	Length
1.	"Nervous, Sad, Poor...": "The Dead Flag Blues (Intro)"; "Slow Moving Trains"; "The Cowboy..."; "Drugs in Tokyo"; "The Dead Flag Blues (Outro)"; "Untitled"	20:43: 6:09; 3:23; 4:16; 3:29; 1:52; 1:36
2.	"Bleak, Uncertain, Beautiful...": "...Nothing's Alrite in Our Life..." / "The Dead Flag Blues (Reprise)"; "The Sad Mafioso..."; "Kicking Horse on Brokenhill"; "String Loop Manufactured During Downpour..."	17:36: 2:03; 5:33; 5:37; 4:26^{*}
Total length:		38:22 / ∞

CD release
No.	Title	Length
1.	"The Dead Flag Blues": "The Dead Flag Blues (Intro)"; "Slow Moving Trains" / "The Cowboy..."; "The Dead Flag Blues (Outro)"	16:27: 6:37; 7:50; 2:00
2.	"East Hastings": "Nothing's Alrite in Our Life..." / "The Dead Flag Blues (Reprise)"; "The Sad Mafioso..."; "Drugs in Tokyo" / "Black Helicopter"	17:58: 1:35; 10:44; 5:41
3.	"Providence": "Divorce & Fever..."; "Dead Metheny..."; "Kicking Horse on Brokenhill"; "String Loop Manufactured During Downpour..."; Silence; "J.L.H. Outro"	29:02: 2:45; 8:07; 5:53; 4:37; 3:30; 4:08
Total length:		63:29

=== Notes ===
==== LP ====
- Names of movements are not actually given anywhere in the LP release; these are extrapolated from the CD release.
- The final movement on side one does not have a corresponding segment on the CD release.
- ^* Time lengths given are approximations due to the record's locked groove.

==== CD ====
- "J.L.H. Outro" was named in honor of John Lee Hooker. On the CD edition it is a hidden track that begins after approximately 3 minutes and 30 seconds of silence after the end of "Providence".

== Personnel ==
=== Godspeed You! Black Emperor ===
- Aidan Girt – drums
- Bruce Cawdron – percussion
- Christophe Comte – violin
- David Bryant – guitar
- Efrim Menuck – electric guitar
- Peter Harry Hill – bag pipes
- Mauro Pezzente – bass guitar
- Mike Moya – guitar, banjo
- Norsola Johnson – cello
- Thea Pratt – French horn
- Thierry Amar – bass guitar

=== Guest musicians ===
All guest musicians are credited in the liner notes of the album. No surnames or instruments played are given.

- Amanda
- Colin
- D.
- Dan O.
- Jesse
- Peter
- Shnaeberg
- Steph
- Sylvain

=== Production and design ===
- Ian Ilavsky, Don Wilkie, Godspeed You! Black Emperor – producer, mixing engineer
- Arthur John Tinholt – locomotive etching

== Notes ==
^{α} The singing takes place during "The Sad Mafioso..." movement, and spans from 8:20 to 8:50. It is only included on the Compact Disc version. Live performances also contain the singing. Examples can be heard here and here at the 13:30 and 11:37 marks, respectively.

^{β} The speaker closely quotes the first verse, with some small changes. Lyrics for the song "A Country Boy Can Survive" can be found here.
