= Constellation Records (Canada) discography =

This article contains a discography of Constellation Records.

== Releases ==
Cat. No.	Artist	Title	Year
CST001/SIS001	Sofa	New Era Building 7"	1997
CST002	Sofa	Grey	1997
CST003	Godspeed You! Black Emperor	F♯A♯∞ [1995-1997]	1997
CST004	Exhaust	Exhaust	1998 (CD 2000)
CST005	Do Make Say Think	Do Make Say Think	1998
CST006	Godspeed You! Black Emperor	Slow Riot for New Zero Kanada E.P.	1999
CST007	Sackville	The Principles of Science 10"	1999
CST008	Fly Pan Am	Fly Pan Am	1999
CST009	A Silver Mt. Zion	He Has Left Us Alone but Shafts of Light Sometimes Grace the Corner of Our Rooms…	2000
CST010	Do Make Say Think	Goodbye Enemy Airship the Landlord Is Dead	2000
CST011	Fly Pan Am	Sédatifs en fréquences et sillons	2000
CST012	Godspeed You! Black Emperor	Lift Yr. Skinny Fists Like Antennas to Heaven	2000
CST013	Frankie Sparo	My Red Scare	2000
CST014	1-Speed Bike	Droopy Butt Begone!	2000
CST015	Re:	Mnant	2001
CST016	Hangedup	Hangedup	2001
CST017	Frankie Sparo	Arena Hostile	2001
CST018	A Silver Mt. Zion (as The Silver Mt. Zion Memorial Orchestra & Tra-La-La Band)	Born into Trouble as the Sparks Fly Upward	2001
CST019	Fly Pan Am	Ceux qui inventent n'ont jamais vécu (?)	2002
CST020	Do Make Say Think	& Yet & Yet	2002
CST021	Exhaust	Enregistreur	2002
CST022	Hangedup	Kicker in Tow	2002
CST023	Frankie Sparo	Welcome Crummy Mystics	2003
CST024	Godspeed You! Black Emperor	Yanqui U.X.O.	2002
CST025	Do Make Say Think	winter hymn country hymn secret hymn	2003
CST026	Polmo Polpo	Like Hearts Swelling	2003
CST027	A Silver Mt. Zion (as The Silver Mt. Zion Memorial Orchestra & Tra-La-La Band with Choir)	"This Is Our Punk-Rock," Thee Rusted Satellites Gather + Sing,	2003
CST028	Elizabeth Anka Vajagic	Stand with the Stillness of this Day	2004
CST029	Black Ox Orkestar	Ver Tanzt?	2004
CST030	A Silver Mt. Zion (as Thee Silver Mountain Reveries)	The "Pretty Little Lightning Paw" E.P.	2004
CST031	Fly Pan Am	N'Écoutez Pas	2004
CST032	Re:	alms	2004
CST033	A Silver Mt. Zion (as Thee Silver Mt. Zion Memorial Orchestra & Tra-La-La Band)	Horses in the Sky	2004
CST034	Hangedup	Clatter For Control	2005
CST035	Elizabeth Anka Vajagic	Nostalgia/Pain EP	2005
CST036	Hrsta	Stem Stem in Electro	2005
CST037	Glissandro 70	Glissandro 70	2006
CST038	Black Ox Orkestar	Nisht Azoy	2006
CST040	Feu Thérèse	Feu Thérèse	2006
CST041	Carla Bozulich	Evangelista	2006
CST042	Sandro Perri	Plays Polmo Polpo	2006
CST043	Eric Chenaux	Dull Lights	2006
CST044	Lullabye Arkestra	Ampgrave	2006
CST045	Do Make Say Think	You, You're a History in Rust	2007
CST046	Vic Chesnutt	North Star Deserter	2007
CST047	Sandro Perri	Tiny Mirrors	2007
CST048	Hrsta	Ghosts Will Come and Kiss Our Eyes	2007
CST049	Feu Thérèse	Ça Va Cogner	2007
CST050	Evangelista	Hello, Voyager	2008
CST051	A Silver Mt. Zion (as Thee Silver Mt. Zion Memorial Orchestra & Tra-La-La Band)	13 Blues for Thirteen Moons	2008
CST052	Eric Chenaux	Sloppy Ground	2008
CST053	The Dead Science	Throne of Blood (The Jump Off)	2008
CST054	The Dead Science	Villainaire	2008
CST055	Tindersticks	The Hungry Saw	2008
CST056	Jem Cohen with Vic Chesnutt and Silver Mount Zion	Empires of Tin DVD	2009
CST057	Clues	Clues	2009
CST058	Land of Kush	Against The Day	2009
CST059	Elfin Saddle	Ringing for the begin again	2009
CST060	Vic Chesnutt	At The Cut	2009
CST061	Evangelista/Carla Bozulich	Prince of Truth	2009
CST062	Do Make Say Think	Other Truths	2009
CST063	A Silver Mt. Zion (as Thee Silver Mt. Zion Memorial Orchestra)	Kollaps Tradixionales	2010
CST064	Clues	Endless Forever 7"	2009
CST065	Tindersticks	Falling Down A Mountain	2010
CST066	Land Of Kush's Egyptian Light Orchestra	Monogamy	2010
CST067	Siskiyou	Siskiyou	2010
CST068	Eric Chenaux	Warm Weather with Ryan Driver	2010
CST069	Elfin Saddle	Wurld	2010
CST070	Les Momies De Palerme	Brulez Ce Coeur (Part of Musique Fragile 01)	2010
CST071	Khora	Silent Your Body Is Endless (Part of Musique Fragile 01)	2010
CST072	Nick Kuepfer	Avestruz (Part of Musique Fragile 01)	2010
CST073	Colin Stetson	Righteous Wrath	2010
CST074	Pat Jordache	Radio Generation 7"	2011
CST075	Colin Stetson	New History Warfare Vol.2: Judges	2011
CST076	Pat Jordache	Future Songs	2011
CST077	Tindersticks	Claire Denis Film Scores 1996-2009	2011
CST078	Efrim Manuel Menuck	Plays "High Gospel"	2011
CST079	Matana Roberts	COIN COIN Chapter One: Gens de couleur libres	2011
CST080	Esmerine	La Lechuza	2011
CST081	Godspeed You! Black Emperor	'Allelujah! Don't Bend! Ascend!	2012
CST082	Evangelista	In Animal Tongue	2011
CST083	Siskiyou	Keep Away the Dead	2011
CST084	Colin Stetson	Those Who Didn't Run	2011
CST085	Sandro Perri	Impossible Spaces	2011
CST086	Tindersticks	The Something Rain	2012
CST087	Elfin Saddle	Devastates	2012
CST088	Eric Chenaux	Guitar and Voice	2012
CST089	Kanada 70	Vamp Ire	2012
CST090	Pacha	Affaires Étrangères	2012
CST091	Hangedup & Tony Conrad	Transit of Venus	2012
CST092	Colin Stetson	New History Warfare Vol. 3: To See More Light	2013
CST093	Jerusalem In My Heart	Mo7it Al-Mo7it	2013
CST094	Saltland	I Thought It Was Us But It Was All Of Us	2013
CST095	Sarah Neufeld	Hero Brother	2013
CST096	Esmerine	Dalmak	2013
CST097	Land Of Kush	The Big Mango	2013
CST098	Matana Roberts	COIN COIN Chapter Two: Mississippi Moonchile	2013
CST099	A Silver Mt. Zion	Fuck Off Get Free We Pour Light On Everything	2014
CST101	Sandro Perri	Spaced Out EP	2013
CST102	Carla Bozulich	Boy	2014
CST103	Ought	More Than Any Other Day	2014
CST104	Hiss Tracts	Shortwave Nights	2014
CST105	A Silver Mt. Zion	Hang On To Each Other EP	2014
CST106	Avec Le Soleil Sortant De Sa Bouche	Zubberdust!	2014
CST107	Last Ex	Last Ex	2014
CST108	Ought	Once More With Feeling EP	2014
CST109	Siskiyou	Nervous	2015
CST110	Matana Roberts	COIN COIN Chapter Three: River Run Thee	2015
CST111	Godspeed You! Black Emperor	Asunder, Sweet and Other Distress	2015
CST112	Eric Chenaux	Skullsplitter	2015
CST113	Colin Stetson and Sarah Neufeld	Never Were The Way She Was	2015
CST114	Jerusalem In My Heart	If He Dies, If If If If If If	2015
CST115	Ought	Sun Coming Down	2015
CST116	Esmerine	Lost Voices	2015
CST117	Off World	1	2016
CST118	Automatisme	Momentform Accumulations	2016
CST119	Jason Sharp	A Boat Upon Its Blood	2016
CST121	Avec Le Soleil Sortant De Sa Bouche	Pas pire pop, I Love You So Much	2017
CST122	The Infected Mass	Those Who Walk Away	2017
CST123	Saltland	A Common Truth	2017
CST124	Jessica Moss	Pools Of Light	2017
CST125	Joni Void	Selfless	2017
CST126	Godspeed You! Black Emperor	Luciferian Towers	2017
CST127	Off World	2	2017
CST128	Esmerine	Mechanics Of Dominion	2017
CST129	Efrim Manuel Menuck	Pissing Stars	2018
CST130	Jason Sharp	Stand Above The Streams	2018
CST131	Eric Chenaux	Slowly Paradise	2018
CST132	Carla Bozulich	Quieter	2018
CST133	Alanis Obomsawin	Bush Lady	2018
CST134	Joyfultalk	Plurality Trip	2018
CST135	Automatisme	Transit	2018
CST136	Sandro Perri	In Another Life	2018
CST137	Jerusalem In My Heart	Daqa'iq Tudaiq	2018
CST138	Jessica Moss	Entanglement	2018
CST139	Light Conductor	Sequence One	2019
CST140	Joni Void	Mise En Abyme	2019
CST141	Deadbeat & Camara	Trinity Thirty	2019
CST142	Siskiyou	Not Somewhere	2019
CST143	Lungbutter	Honey	2019
CST144	Efrim Manuel Menuck & Kevin Doria	are SING SINCK, SING	2019
CST145	Matana Roberts	COIN COIN Chapter Four: Memphis	2019
CST146	Land of Kush	Sand Enigma	2019
CST147	Fly Pan Am	C'est ça	2019
CST148	Sandro Perri	Soft Landing	2019
CST149	Rebecca Foon	Waxing Moon	2020
CST150	JOYFULTALK	A Separation Of Being	2020
CST151	T. Griffin	The Proposal	2021
CST152	Markus Floats	Third Album	2020
CST153	T. Gowdy	Therapy With Colour	2020
CST154	Jason Sharp	The Turning Centre Of A Spinning World	2021
CST155	Fly Pan Am	Frontera	2021
CST156	Godspeed You! Black Emperor	G_d’s Pee AT STATE’S END!	2021
CST157	Sofa	Source Crossfire	2021
CST158	Jerusalem in My Heart	Qalaq	2021
CST159	Light Conductor	Sequence Two	2021
CST160	Eric Chenaux	Say Laura	2022
CST161	Jessica Moss	Phosphenes	2021
CST162	Kee Avil	Crease	2022
CST163	JOYFULTALK	Familiar Science	2022
CST164	Automatisme & Stefan Paulus	Gap/Void	2022
CST165	T. Gowdy	Miracles	2022
CST166	Esmerine	Everything Was The Same Until It Was No More	2022
CST167	Steve Bates	All The Things That Happen	2022
CST168	Jessica Moss	Galaxy Heart	2022
CST169	Black Ox Orkestar	Everything Returns	2022
CST170	Matana Roberts	Coin Coin Chapter Five: In the Garden	2023
CST171	ALL HANDS_MAKE LIGHT	"Darling The Dawn"	2023
CST172	Ky	Power Is the Pharmacy	2023
CST173	Joni Void	Everyday Is the Song	2023
CST174	Markus Floats	Fourth Album	2023
CST175	Off World	3	2023
CST176	Erika Angell	The Obsession With Her Voice	2024
CST177	FYEAR	FYEAR	2024
CST178	Kee Avil	Spine	2024
CST179	Eric Chenaux Trio	Delights Of My Life	2024
CST180	WE ARE WINTER'S BLUE AND RADIANT CHILDREN	"NO MORE APOCALYPSE FATHER"	2024
CST183	Godspeed You! Black Emperor	No Title as of 13 February 2024 28,340 Dead	2024

=== Compilations ===
Cat. No.	Artist	Title	Year
CST1COMP	A Silver Mt. Zion, Frankie Sparo, Re:, Exhaust, Hangedup, Sofa, Fly Pan Am, 1-Speed Bike, Sackville, Do Make Say Think	Music Until Now	2002
CST2COMP	Elizabeth Anka Vajagic, Do Make Say Think, Exhaust, Hangedup, Black Ox Orkestar, Sackville, Silver Mt Zion, Sofa, Polmo Polpo, Re:, Fly Pan Am, 1-Speed Bike, Frankie Sparo, Godspeed You! Black Emperor	Song of the Silent Land	2004
CSTMF01		Musique Fragile Volume 01: Les Momies De Palerme / Khôra / Nick Kuepfer	2010
CSTMF02		Musique Fragile 02: Kanada 70 / Pacha / Hangedup & Tony Conrad	2012

== See also ==
- List of record labels
- Constellation Records
