= Rebecca Foon =

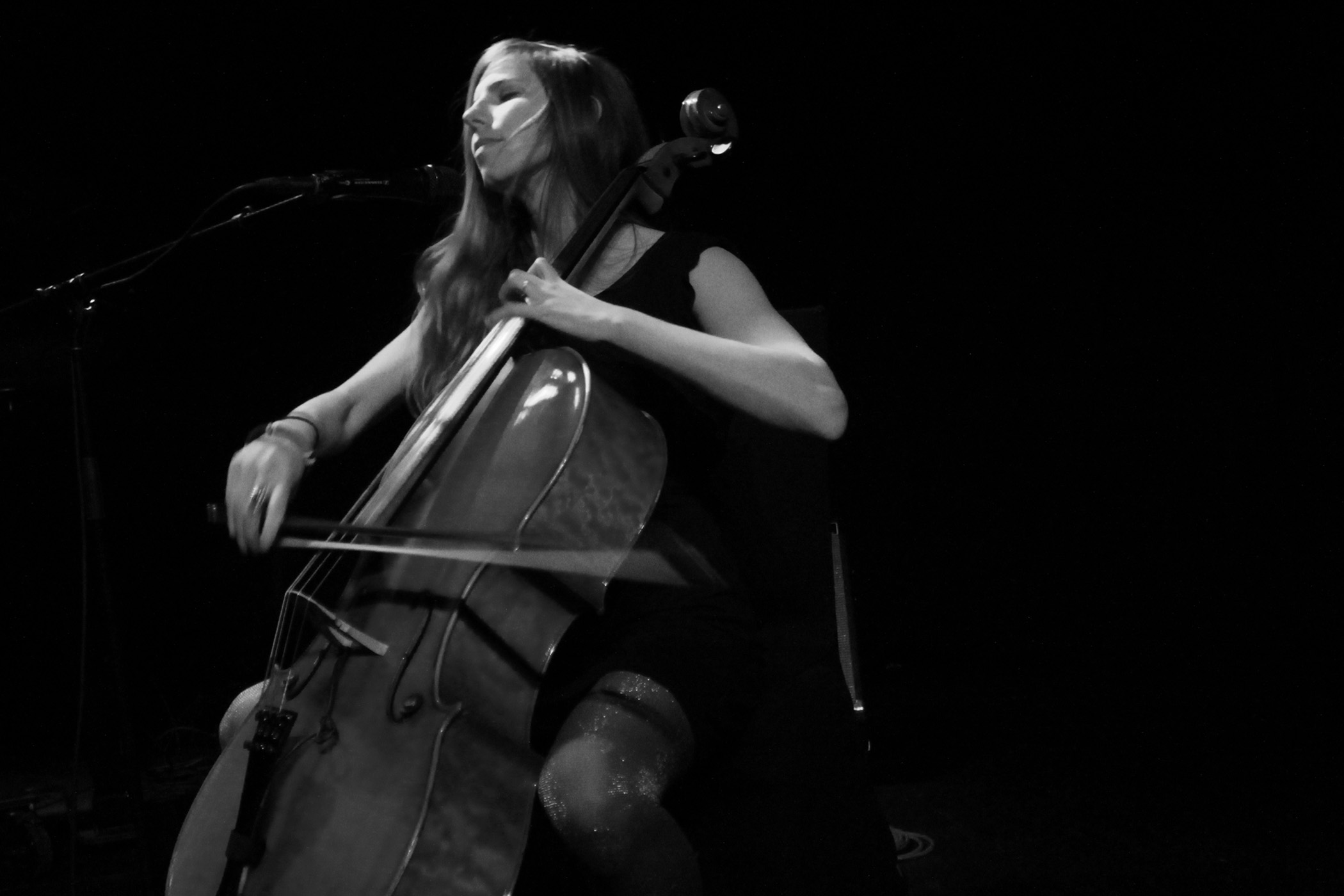

Background information
- Also known as: Beckie Foon, Saltland, Becky Foon
- Born: 13 December 1978 (age 47); Vancouver, British Columbia, Canada
- Origin: Montreal, Quebec
- Genres: Post-rock, avant-garde music, dream pop, shoe gaze
- Occupations: Musician, singer, cellist, composer, visual artist
- Instruments: Cello, vocals, piano, electronics
- Years active: 1996–present
- Labels: Constellation Records, One Little Independent, Fat Cat, Envision Records, Magnolia Records
- Website: saltland.ca rebeccafoon.com

Rebecca Foon (born 13 December 1978) is a Canadian cellist, vocalist, composer and visual artist. Foon currently records under her own name, as well as the alias Saltland, and is a member and co-founder of the modern chamber ensemble Esmerine as well as was a member of A Silver Mt. Zion. She also works with her sister Aliayta Foon-Dancoes.

== Summary of career ==
Foon has been a member of several groups associated with the post-rock, experimental, and chamber music scenes of Montreal and New York City, including Set Fire to Flames, A Silver Mt. Zion, and Colin Stetson's Gorecki Symphony of Sorrow ensemble. Esmerine's Turkish folk-influenced album Dalmak, released in 2013, received the Juno Award for Instrumental Album of the Year in 2014, as did their 2022 album Everything Was Forever Until It Was No More.

In 2013, Foon released her first Saltland album, which Exclaim.ca described as a "combination of genres from dream pop to chamber music to ambient and shoegaze". Her follow-up album, A Common Truth, was praised by The Skinny. and was co-written with Warren Ellis.

In 2020, Foon released Waxing Moon, her first album under her own name. In 2024 she released a neo classical album, First Sounds with Sarah Neufeld and Richard Reed Parry. In 2025 she released a dream pop album, Black Butterflies featuring Patrick Watson as well as Reverie with her sister Aliayta Foon-Dancoes. She has also composed soundtracks for film and museum projects.

== Early life ==
Rebecca Foon was born in 1978 in Canada, and raised in Vancouver. She is the daughter of art educator and producer Jane Howard Baker, and playwright, producer, screenwriter, and novelist Dennis Foon.

== Music career ==
=== Early years ===
In 1996, when she was 17, Foon moved to Montreal from Vancouver, and soon became involved in the city's DIY music scene. She has been a member of several groups associated with the post rock, experimental and chamber music scene of Montreal, including ongoing collaborations with musicians who are members of post-rock band Godspeed You! Black Emperor as well as indie rock band Arcade Fire. Among her earliest projects, in 1995, Foon teamed up with Spencer Krug (Wolf Parade, Sunset Rubdown, and Moonface) and Rachel Levine (Cakelk), forming the instrumental string/piano/accordion-based trio Fifths of Seven. Foon collaborated with choreographer Alyson Vishnovska to perform in the 1999 edition of the Edgy Women Festival.

=== A Silver Mt. Zion ===
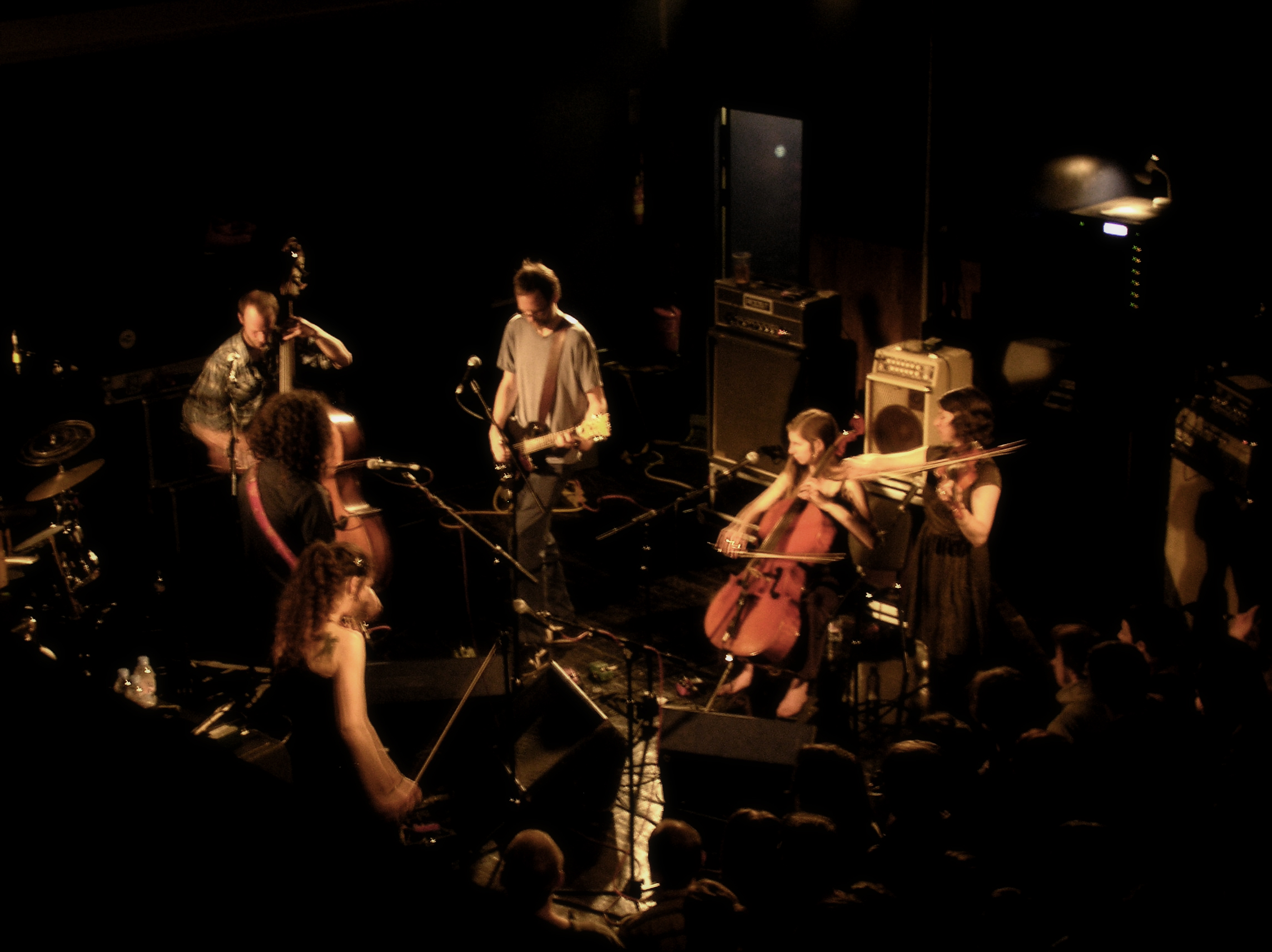
Foon (center) playing cello with Thee Silver Mt. Zion Memorial Orchestra in 2007

Soon after moving to Montreal, Foon began playing cello and composing with Thee Silver Mt. Zion Memorial Orchestra, a band that formed in Montreal in 1999. Foon joined in 2000, when the band expanded from a trio into a sextet. Foon plays on the band's second album, Born into Trouble as the Sparks Fly Upward, released in 2001 on Constellation Records. The minimalist album was well received by music critics, including Allmusic and Pitchfork Media. The band toured in 2001 in Europe. That year Foon began playing in the associated band Set Fire to Flames as well.

The next Silver Mt. Zion album, "This Is Our Punk-Rock," Thee Rusted Satellites Gather + Sing, released in 2003, saw no change in the core line-up, excluding the inclusion of a makeshift choir. The album was essentially created as a requiem for open and abandoned spaces in Montreal, as well as for similar loss and decay around the world, due to either urban development or military action. Foon continued to perform live and recorded two more records with the band while she began working on other projects. Horses in the Sky was the band's first to include lyrics on every track, with Foon contributing to the vocals and also helping mix the recording. In 2008, Silver Mt. Zion toured Europe and North America. That summer, Foon and several other members resigned from the band.

=== Set Fire to Flames ===
In 2001, she became a member of the Montreal post-rock band Set Fire to Flames. The band released two albums before it split in 2003, and many of their tracks are minimalist in nature, filled with ambient noise and other non-musical sound effects, juxtaposed or combined with instrumental music. 2001 saw her contribute to the band's debut Sings Reign Rebuilder. The album was recorded in a century old house apparently bound for destruction. As such, several sounds usually edited out of the recording process, including creaking floors, paper shuffling and outside noises such as police sirens were left intact on the final album. The album met with positive reviews from Pitchfork Media, Allmusic, and Sputnikmusic.

Two years later, in 2003, she again contributed to Telegraphs in Negative/Mouths Trapped in Static by Set Fire to Flames. Recorded in a barn in Ontario, the release utilizes guitars, basses, strings, horns, glockenspiel, marimba, bass clarinet, saw, cymbalon, hurdy-gurdy, music boxes, modified electronics, and contact microphones. The album was even more experimental than the previous, and met with mixed reviews from magazines such as Sputnik.

=== Esmerine ===
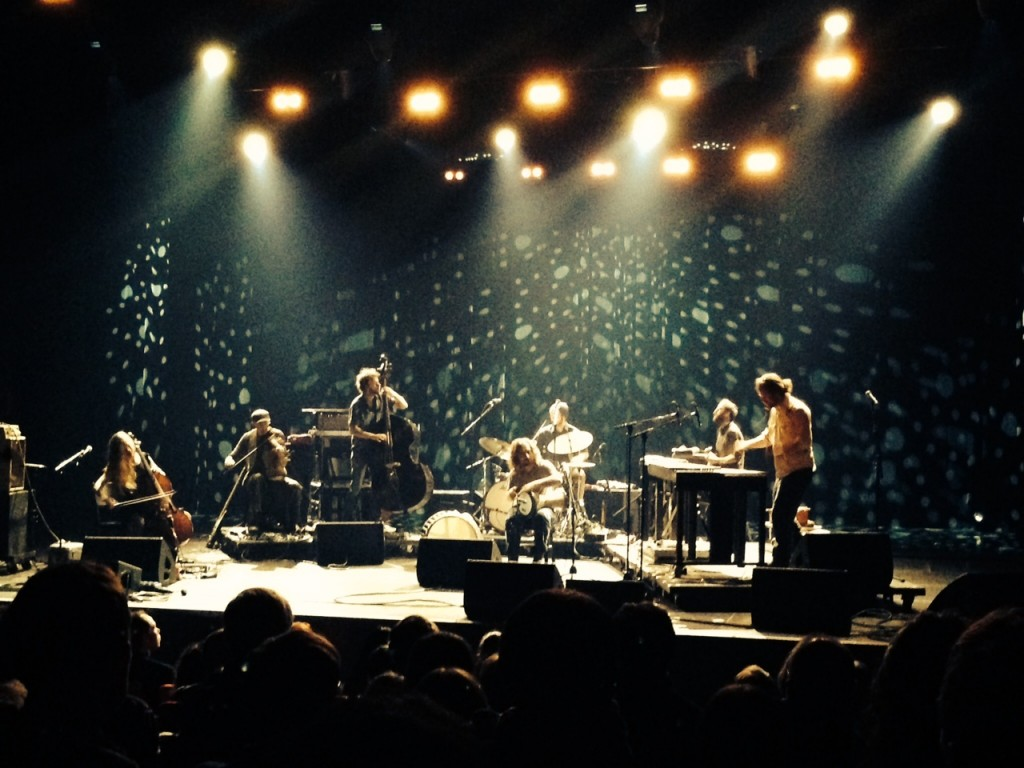
Foon (far left) playing cello with Esmerine

In 2001, Foon co-founded the chamber rock group Esmerine with percussionist Bruce Cawdron. The two had met while recording Set Fire to Flames' debut album. However, instead of using the guitar-focused sound of their other projects, the duo initially focused on marimba and cello, drawing on minimalist classical music and chamber music. The band initially performed their original music in gigs around Montreal.

Esmerine released their debut album, If Only a Sweet Surrender to the Nights to Come Be True, in 2003. Allmusic gave it 4/5 stars and called it "a sublime chamber rock album," stating "A French female name meaning quiet and sensitive, Esmerine is a fitting moniker for the overall sound." They released their second album Aurora in 2005. Afterwards, Foon dedicated more time to Thee Silver Mt. Zion, though she continued to periodically perform with Esmerine in Montreal, often bringing in guest artists or collaborating with other groups.

=== La Lechuza and Dalmak ===
As Esmerine, Foon and Bruce Cawdron began writing new music together in earnest in 2009, when their friend Lhasa de Sela invited them to open up for her as well as collaborate. For their third album, La Lechuza, two new members joined the group: Sarah Pagé, a harp player, and multi-instrumentalist Andrew Barr. Released in 2011, La Lechuza was listed as one of the top ten underground records of the year in Mojo.

La Lechuza is thus dedicated to Lhasa de Sela. The band collaborated with Patrick Watson on the album and released a song entitled "Snow Day for Lhasa", as well as created a site – snowdayforlhasa.com – dedicated to Lhasa. Patrick Watson also contributed vocals on two songs and produced the album, with other guests contributing, including violinist Sarah Neufeld (Arcade Fire) and saxophonist Colin Stetson.

After Barr and Page became occupied with their other projects, Esmerine added two new members to their touring lineup: percussionist Jamie Thomson and multi-instrumentalist Brian Sanderson. After a number of live performances, the quartet began writing new material in early 2012. After performing in Istanbul, the band was invited to return for an artist residency later that year. They decided to turn a rented loft into a makeshift recording studio, and recorded an album in the loft, collaborating with Turkish musicians they had met there; they later toured together. Among the guest musicians were Hakan Vreskala, Baran Aşık, Ali Kazim Akdağ, and James Hakan Dedeoğlu, who contributed instruments such as the bendir, darbuka, erbane, meh, barama, saz, and electric guitar. The album, Dalmak, was completed in the winter of 2012 and 2013 at Breakglass Studios in Montreal, with engineer Jace Lasek. The word "dalmak" means "immerse" in Turkish. It can also be interpreted as "to dive into," "to contemplate," and "to be absorbed in." The album, Dalmak, was released in 2013 and awarded Instrumental Album of the Year at the Juno Awards of 2014. The Line of Best Fit said the album featured "experimental noises that blur the line between post-rock, minimalist electronica and Turkish folk."

=== Lost Voices ===
Lost Voices is the result of multiple recording sessions led by Vid Cousins (Kid Koala, Amon Tobin, Colin Stetson) and was mixed/produced by Jace Lasek at Breakglass Studio in Montréal. The album features several tracks that use electric guitars alongside marimba, strings and percussion. Expanding from Dalmak's core quartet, Esmerine expanded with bassist Jeremi Roy (who began touring with the group in 2013) as an official member. Lost Voices includes the appearance of GY!BE/Silver Mt. Zion violinist Sophie Trudeau as a guest.

=== Everything Was Forever Until It Was No More ===
The record won Junos for Best Instrumental Album of the Year as well as Recording Package of the Year in 2023. The album was dedicated to Foon's mother who had passed away of cancer while the band was recording the album.

=== Other albums ===
In 2004, Foon teamed up with Spencer Krug (Wolf Parade, Sunset Rubdown, and Moonface) and Rachel Levine (Cakelk) to form the string/piano/accordion-based trio Fifths of Seven, releasing its first album, Spry from Bitter Anise Folds, in 2005. 2005 saw Foon contribute cello to a number of other albums as well. Among these were From Cells of Roughest Air by The Mile End Ladies String Auxiliary, with Sophie Trudeau (Godspeed You! Black Emperor, A Silver Mt. Zion) and Genevieve Heistek (HangedUp).

=== Collaborations, guest appearances, and soundtracks ===
She has had guest appearances on albums such as Just Another Ordinary Day by Patrick Watson in 2003; Do You Like Rock Music? by British Sea Power in 2011; North Star Deserter by Vic Chesnutt and Return to the Sea by Islands in 2007; and Hot Wax by Grant Hart in 2009. In 2011, she was involved with the film and music project National Parks Project by Last Gang Records. Foon has performed and recorded with musicians such as Tanya Tagaq, Patti Smith, Jesse Paris Smith, Flea, Warren Ellis, Tenzin Choegyal, Colin Stetson, Patrick Watson, Laurie Anderson, Lhasa De Sela, and Nick Cave and the Bad Seeds, and has composed for film soundtracks, including Shannon Walsh's feature-length documentary H2Oil, with Ian Ilavsky, co-founder of Constellation Records. The film is a documentary on the extraction of oil from tar sands in Alberta. Foon has also composed several soundtracks for the National Film Board of Canada and many museums and has been a touring member of Sam Green and Brent Green's Live Cinema, along with Brendan Canty, James Canty, and Kate Ryan.

=== I Thought It Was Us But It Was All of Us (2013) ===
In 2010, she began working on solo material, enlisting the help of Jamie Thompson (The Unicorns) on percussion and programming. Handling vocals and cello, among the sounds on which Foon focused were drone, no wave, improv, dream pop, and minimalism; eventually, the project Saltland was formed. This work culminated in the release of I Thought It Was Us But It Was All of Us on Constellation Records in 2013. Among the guest musicians on the album were Sarah Neufeld, Colin Stetson, Laurel Sprengelmeyer of Little Scream, and Richard Reed Parry of Arcade Fire.

"This album is about the power of community. It weaves in themes of sustainability, climate change, environmental degradation, urban agriculture and hope for new beginnings and fostering a sustainable path forward together. Images of salt-land deserts and innovative urban designs, like the High Line in New York were on my mind while composing this record. I was also thinking about Downtown Eastside, Vancouver, which is where I grew up."
— Saltland

All of the songs were constructed from cello loops. About the themes, Foon stated she was trying to create a "sonic landscape" that would allow her to explore themes such as urban landscapes, urban poverty and youth homelessness, environmental issues, and "the control/criminalisation of protest and political action, which is a huge issue in general and particularly in Montreal these days." About the mood of the compositions, "I don't consider the music to be reductively dark and cold, I was really seeking to hold a lot of different tones and feelings in tension: clear-eyed observation, reverie, meditation, activism/agency – and hope and warmth too. It's not a pretty world these days, but I wanted to also leave the listener with a sense of hope."

Exclaim.ca called it "a captivating combination of genres from dream pop to chamber music to ambient and shoegaze." The Skinny stated the project "eschews the overwrought melodrama of Thee Silver Mt. Zion and Set Fire to Flames for an intricate and understated approach, blending soft, tender vocals with strings, drones and electronica." According to Beats Per Minutes, "The songs on this record seem to revel in the evocation of tangible places. Each song seems to unfold into a vast landscape of dust-covered hills and barren horizons-all encased in a gauzy analog haze."

In 2013 and 2014, Saltland toured Canada and the United States with Spencer Krug's Moonface. In 2017, she released her second album, partly co-written with Warren Ellis.

=== Waxing Moon (2020) ===
In 2020, Foon released Waxing Moon, her first album under her own name.

=== Black Butterflies (2024) ===
In 2025, Foon released Black Butterflies.

== Personal life ==
As of 2021, Foon is based in Montreal. She is an environmental and social activist and a member of Sustainability Solutions Group, a "sustainability and climate change consulting cooperative." Foon also co-founded Pathway to Paris and the 1000 Cities Initiative for Carbon Freedom with Jesse Paris Smith (that has put on international concerts in collaboration with the United Nations featuring Thom Yorke, Flea, Patti Smith, Joan Baez, Bob Weir, Talib Kweli, Lucinda Williams and more), and Junglekeepers with Paul Rosolie.

== Awards and nominations ==
| Year | Award | Nominated work | Category | Result |
|---|---|---|---|---|
| 2014 | Juno Awards | Dalmak by Esmerine | Instrumental Album of the Year | Won |
| 2016 | Juno Awards | Lost Voices by Esmerine | Instrumental Album of the Year | Lost |
| 2016 | Juno Awards | Lost Voices by Esmerine | Recording Package of the Year | Won |
| 2022 | Juno Awards | Everything Was Forever Until It Was No More by Esmerine | Instrumental Album of the Year | Won |
| 2022 | Juno Awards | Everything Was Forever Until It Was No More by Esmerine | Recording Package of the Year | Won |

| Year | Album title | Release details |
|---|---|---|
| 2013 | I Thought It Was Us But It Was All of Us (as Saltland) | Released: 14 May 2013; Label: Constellation; Format: CD, vinyl, digital |
| 2017 | A Common Truth (as Saltland) | Released: 31 March 2017; Label: Constellation; Format: CD, vinyl, digital |
| 2020 | Waxing Moon | Released: 21 February 2020; Label: Constellation; Format: CD, vinyl, digital |
| 2025 | Black Butterflies | Released: 24 October 2025; Label: Envision Records; Format: vinyl, digital |

== Sarah Neufeld, Richard Reed Parry, Rebecca Foon ==
- 2024: First Sounds

== A Silver Mt. Zion ==
- 2001: Born into Trouble as the Sparks Fly Upward
- 2003: "This Is Our Punk-Rock," Thee Rusted Satellites Gather + Sing
- 2005: Horses in the Sky
- 2008: 13 Blues for Thirteen Moons

== Set Fire to Flames ==
- 2001: Sings Reign Rebuilder
- 2003: Telegraphs in Negative/Mouths Trapped in Static

== Esmerine ==
- 2003: If Only a Sweet Surrender to the Nights to Come Be True
- 2005: Aurora
- 2011: La Lechuza
- 2013: Dalmak
- 2015: Lost Voices
- 2017: Mechanics of Dominion
- 2022: Everything Was Forever Until It Was No More

== The Mile End Ladies String Auxiliary ==
- 2005: From Cells of Roughest Air

== Fifths of Seven ==
- 2005: Spry from Bitter Anise Folds

=== Guest appearances ===
Incomplete list of credits for Rebecca Foon
| Yr | Release title | Primary artist(s) | Label | Notes, role |
|---|---|---|---|---|
| 2003 | Just Another Ordinary Day | Patrick Watson | Self-released | Cello |
| 2004 | Stand With the Stillness of the Day | Elizabeth Anka Vajagic | Constellation | Cello |
| 2004 | Lesbians on Ecstasy | Lesbians on Ecstasy | Alien8 | Cello |
| 2004 | If Night is a Weed and Day Grows Less | Mitchell Akiyama | SubRosa | Cello |
| 2005 | Stem Stem in Electro | Hrsta | Constellation | Cello |
| 2006 | Nisht Azoy | Black Ox Orkestar | Constellation | Cello |
| 2006 | Evangelista | Carla Bozulich | Constellation | Cello |
| 2007 | Return to the Sea | Islands | Rough Trade | Cello |
| 2007 | North Star Deserter | Vic Chesnutt | Constellation | Cello |
| 2008 | Hello Voyageur | Evangelista | Constellation | Cello |
| 2009 | Hot Wax | Grant Hart | Con d'Or | Cello |
| 2009 | Against the Day | Land of Kush | Constellation | Cello |
| 2010 | Cloak and Cipher | Land of Talk | Saddle Creek | Cello |
| 2011 | Do You Like Rock Music? | British Sea Power | Rough Trade | Cello |
| 2011 | National Parks Project (LP and film) | Various | Last Gang | Composition, cello |
| 2011 | The Golden Record | Little Scream | Secretly Canadian | Cello |
| 2013 | The Big Mango | Land of Kush | Constellation | Cello |

=== Soundtracks ===
- 2023: Two One Two (short animation by Shira Avni)
- 2023: Phyllis, Silenced (feature by Roland Ellis) Soundtrack by Rebecca Foon and Sarah Neufeld
- 2020: Thanadoula (short animation by Robin McKenna)
- 2017: The Departure (by Lana Wilson)
- 2017: Freelancer on the Front Lines with Esmerine (by Santiago Bertolino)
- 2016: Live Cinema with Brendan Canty, Kate Ryan and James Canty (by Sam Green and Brent Green)
- 2013: My Little Underground (short animation by Elise Simard)
- 2012: National Parks Project
- 2012: The Kiss (short animation by Eva Cvijanovic)
- 2008: H2Oil (by Shannon Walsh)

=== Featured on ===
- 2025: The Girl Who Cried Pearls (stop motion-animated short film by Chris Lavis & Maciek Szczerbowski)
- 2014: Evolution of a Criminal (by Darius Clark Monroe)
- 2011: A Walk into the Sea (by Esther Robinson)
- 2010: Higglety Pigglety Pop! or There Must Be More to Life (short animation by Chris Lavis & Maciek Szczerbowski)
- 2007: Madame Tutli-Putli (stop motion-animated short film by Chris Lavis & Maciek Szczerbowski)

== See also ==
- Juno Awards of 2014
