= Song of the Silent Land =

Compilation album by various Constellation artists
- Released: September 6, 2004
- Recorded: 1995–2004
- Genres: Post-rock; Experimental
- Length: 79:47
- Label: Constellation

Various Constellation artists chronology
Music Until Now (2002)	Song of the Silent Land (2004)

Song of the Silent Land (2004) is the second various-artists compilation album from Constellation Records, and their first to feature unreleased and hard-to-find tracks from the label roster: 13 of the 14 tracks were previously unreleased.

== Track listing ==
1. "The Sky Lay Still" – Elizabeth Anka Vajagic (6:22)
2. "Winter Hymn Winter Hymn Winter Hymn" – Do Make Say Think (4:54)
3. "Wool Fever Dub" – Exhaust (3:05)
4. "(Re)View from the Ground" – Hangedup (4:30)
5. "Toyte Goyes in Shineln" – Black Ox Orkestar (3:44)
6. "This Machine" – Sackville (4:57)
7. "Iron Bridge to Thunder Bay" – Silver Mt. Zion (8:12)
8. "String of Lights" – Sofa (5:33)
9. "Dreaming (...Again)" – Polmo Polpo (4:50)
10. "Slippage" – Re: (3:25)
11. "Tres Tres 'Avant' " – Fly Pan Am (5:10)
12. "Fair Warning" – 1-Speed Bike (5:03)
13. "See My Film" – Frankie Sparo (3:57)
14. "UNTITLED_88" - storm (8:27)
15. "Outro [Live in Nantes]" – Godspeed You! Black Emperor (7:33)

== Notes ==
- UNTITLED_88 by storm is not on streaming services, and is only on the first 500 pressings of this record
