= Droopy Butt Begone! =

Studio album by 1-Speed Bike
- Released: October 23, 2000
- Recorded: Hotel 2 Tango
- Genre: Electronica
- Length: 36:38
- Label: Constellation CST014
- Producer: Aidan Girt

1-Speed Bike chronology
Droopy Butt Begone! (2000)	Looks Like Velvet, Smells Like Pee (2002)

Professional ratings
Review scores
Source	Rating
Allmusic	2.5/5 stars

Droopy Butt Begone! is the debut album of solo electronic artist 1-Speed Bike. The third track on this album is a remix of a Fly Pan Am song from their Sédatifs En Fréquences Et Sillons EP.

== Track listing ==
1. "The Day That Mauro Ran over Elwy Yost" – 6:30
2. "Seattle/Washington/Prague 00/68/Chicago/Nixon/Reagan Circle-Fighting Machine" – 3:20
3. "Yuppie Restaurant-Goers Beware Because This Song Is for the Dishwasher" – 6:45
4. "Just Another Jive-Assed White Colonial Theft" – 6:20
5. "Why Are All the Dogs Dying of Cancer?" – 3:35
6. "My Kitchen Is Tiananmen Square" – 5:16
7. "Any Movement That Forgets About Class Is a Bowel Movement" – 4:26
8. untitled – 0:26
