= Siskiyou =

Siskiyou may refer to:

- Siskiyou Mountains, a mountain range in northern California and southern Oregon
- Siskiyou National Forest, in Oregon and California
- Siskiyou County, California
- Siskiyou Trail, an old Native American and pioneer trail connecting Oregon and California
- Siskiyou Summit, a mountain pass (4,037 ft; 1,230 m) on Interstate 5 in southern Oregon
- Siskiyou Mountains salamander
- Siskiyou (newspaper), a student-run newspaper at Southern Oregon University in Ashland, Oregon.
- Siskiyou (band), a Canadian indie folk band.
