= Impossible Spaces =

Studio album by Sandro Perri
- Released: October 25, 2011
- Length: 38:28
- Label: Constellation Records

Sandro Perri chronology
Tiny Mirrors (2007)	Impossible Spaces (2011)

Professional ratings
Aggregate scores
Source	Rating
Metacritic	82/100
Review scores
Source	Rating
AllMusic	3.5/5 stars
Beats Per Minute	82%
Cokemachineglow	82%
Now	5/5 stars
Pitchfork	8.3/10
PopMatters	8/10
The Skinny	2/5 stars
Tiny Mix Tapes	3.5/5 stars
The 405	8/10

Impossible Spaces is the second full-length album by Toronto musician Sandro Perri under his own name. Pitchfork placed the album at number 38 on its list of the "Top 50 albums of 2011".

The album was named as a longlisted nominee for the 2012 Polaris Music Prize on June 14, 2012.

== Track listing ==
All tracks are written by Sandro Perri, except where noted.

No.	Title	Length
1.	"Changes"	7:35
2.	"Love & Light"	3:45
3.	"How Will I?"	7:52
4.	"Futureactive Kid (Part I)"	3:15
5.	"Futureactive Kid (Part II)"	2:05
6.	"Wolfman"	10:35
7.	"Impossible Spaces" (Perri, Jordan Somers)	3:21
