= Telegraphs in Negative/Mouths Trapped in Static =

Telegraphs in Negative / Mouths Trapped in Static

Studio album by Set Fire to Flames
- Released: 8 April 2003
- Recorded: July–August 2002
- Genre: Experimental
- Length: 88:02
- Labels: Alien8; FatCat
- Producer: Set Fire to Flames

Set Fire to Flames chronology
Sings Reign Rebuilder (2001)	Telegraphs in Negative / Mouths Trapped in Static (2003)

Professional ratings
Review scores
Source	Rating
Pitchfork Media	(5.3/10)
Almost Cool	6.5/10 stars

Telegraphs in Negative / Mouths Trapped in Static is the second and final album by Canadian band Set Fire to Flames. The album was recorded during late 2002, and published by Alien8 Recordings and FatCat Records on 8 April 2003.

The album was recorded in a barn in rural Ontario, Canada. The recording atmosphere was decidedly informal—sounds such as the band members talking and moving around can be readily heard during the album's quiet moments. Like their first album, Telegraphs in Negative / Mouths Trapped in Static was recorded "in states of little or no sleep, in varying levels of intoxication, and in physical confinement."

The release utilizes many different instruments, including guitars, basses, strings, horns, glockenspiel, marimba, bass clarinet, cymbalon, hurdy-gurdy, music boxes, modified electronics, saw, and contact microphones.

== Track listing ==
Disc one – Telegraphs in Negative
No.	Title	Length
1.	"Déjà, comme des trous de vent, comme reproduit"	6:43
2.	"Small Steps Against Inertia / Echo of a Dead End"	3:01
3.	"Measure de Mésure"	4:45
4.	"Holy Throat Hiss Tracts to the Sedative Hypnotic"	3:38
5.	"When Sorrow Shoots Her Darts"	3:11
6.	"Kill Fatigue Frequencies"	1:28
7.	"In Prelight Isolate"	15:11
8.	"Tehran in Seizure / Telegraphs in Negative"	5:56
Total length:		43:53

Disc two – Mouths Trapped in Static
No.	Title	Length
1.	"Your Guts Are Like Mine"	2:15
2.	"Fukt Perkusiv / Something About Bad Drugs, Schizophrenics and Grain Silos..."	8:11
3.	"Sleep Maps"	11:52
4.	"Something About Eva Mattes in the Halo of Exploding Street Lamps..."	1:47
5.	"Buzz of Barn Flies Like Faulty Electronics"	3:39
6.	"And the Birds Are About to Bust Their Guts with Singing"	4:52
7.	"Rites of Spring Reverb"	3:33
8.	"Mouths Trapped in Static"	2:27
9.	"This Thing Between Us Is a Rickety Bridge of Impossible Crossing / Bonfires for Nobody..."	5:33
Total length:		44:09 88:02

== Personnel ==
- Beckie Foon: cello
- Bruce Cawdron: drums, percussion, marimba
- Christof Migone: gutted two-track motors, contact mics, faulty electronics
- David Bryant: guitar, tapes
- Fluffy Erskine: saw, percussion, music box, tapes
- Genevieve Heistek: viola
- Gordon Krieger: bass clarinet
- Jean-Sébastien Truchy: electric bass, double bass, music box
- Mike Moya: guitar, tapes
- Roger Tellier-Craig: guitar, CD player, tapes
- Sophie Trudeau: violin, glockenspiel, trumpet
- Thea Pratt: French horn
