= Plays Polmo Polpo =

EP by Sandro Perri
- Released: September 26, 2006
- Recorded: Feb 2004 – Apr 2006
- Genre: Post-rock
- Label: Constellation Records

Sandro Perri chronology
| Glissandro 70 (2006) | Plays Polmo Polpo (2006) | Tiny Mirrors (2007) |

Plays Polmo Polpo is the first record by Sandro Perri under his own name. The first three tracks are covers of songs off of Perri's album Like Hearts Swelling, which he released in 2003 under the name Polmo Polpo. The album was released on September 26, 2006 on Constellation Records.

== Track listing ==
1. "Romeo Heart (Slight Return)" - 5:32
2. "Requiem for a Fox" - 8:41
3. "Sky Histoire" - 4:41
4. "Dreaming" - 3:42
5. "Circles" - 4:23
