= Hrsta =

Canadian post-rock band

- Origin: Montreal, Quebec, Canada
- Genres: Post-rock
- Years active: 2001–present
- Label: Constellation Records
- Members: Mike Moya; Brooke Crouser; Harris Newman; Eric Craven; Lisa Gamble; Nick Kuepfer
- Past members: Geneviève Heistek; Sophie Trudeau

Hrsta (stylized as HṚṢṬA) (/ˈhɜːrʃtə/; Sanskrit: हृष्ट hṛṣṭa [ɦr̩ʂʈɐ], 'thrilling with rapture', 'rejoiced') is a Montreal post-rock band currently signed to Constellation Records. The band's leader, Mike Moya (guitar and vocals), was one of the founding members of Godspeed You! Black Emperor. The other members of the band are Brooke Crouser, Harris Newman, and Eric Craven. Lisa Gamble joined in 2007 and Nick Kuepfer in 2009.

Hrsta's sound has been compared to that of Godspeed You! Black Emperor, Thee Silver Mt. Zion Memorial Orchestra and Set Fire to Flames, owing to Mike Moya's contributions to each. Hrsta, however, differs from these previous projects in that it features Moya as a vocalist.

Their latest album, Ghosts Will Come and Kiss Our Eyes, was released in the fall of 2007.

== Discography ==
- L'éclat du ciel était insoutenable (Album, 2001)
- Stem Stem in Electro (Album, 2005)
- Ghosts Will Come and Kiss Our Eyes (Album, 2007)

== Participation in other projects ==
- Molasses - Mike Moya and Lisa Gamble
- Elizabeth Anka Vajagic's live band - Mike Moya
- Lonesome Hanks - Mike Moya
- Set Fire to Flames - Mike Moya and Brooke Crouser
- Harris Newman - Harris Newman, solo project
- Sackville - Harris Newman, Eric Craven and Geneviève Heistek
- Hangedup - Eric Craven and Geneviève Heistek
- Shortwave - Eric Craven
- Jackie-O Motherfucker - Brooke Crouser
- Swords Project - Brooke Crouser
- Gambletron - Lisa Gamble
- Evangelista - Lisa Gamble
- Clues - Lisa Gamble
