= Ghosts Will Come and Kiss Our Eyes =

Studio album by Hrsta
- Released: September 10, 2007 (Europe); September 25, 2007 (world)
- Recorded: The Pines, Montreal
- Length: 41:50
- Label: Constellation CST048

Hrsta chronology
Stem Stem in Electro (2005)	Ghosts Will Come and Kiss Our Eyes (2007)

Ghosts Will Come and Kiss Our Eyes is the third album by Canadian band Hrsta. It was released on September 10, 2007, by Constellation Records. Its catalogue number is CST048.

== Track listing ==
All tracks written by Hrsta, except where noted.

No.	Title	Writer(s)	English Title	Length
1.	"Entre la mer et l'eau douce"		"Between the Sea and the Fresh Water"	3:51
2.	"Beau village"		"Beautiful Village"	5:01
3.	"The Orchard"			4:33
4.	"Tomorrow Winter Comes"			4:11
5.	"Haunted Pluckley"			2:52
6.	"Hechicero del bosque"		"Wizard of the Forest"	8:42
7.	"Saturn of Chagrin"			5:11
8.	"Kotori"			4:31
9.	"Holiday"	(Barry Gibb/Robin Gibb)		3:09

== Personnel ==
- Mike Moya – guitar, organ, effects, voice
- Brooke Crouser – guitar, organs, effects
- Harris Newman – bass guitar
- Eric Craven – drums
