= Hiss Tracts =

Hiss Tracts is a Canadian experimental musical duo consisting of guitarist and sound engineer David Bryant and guitarist Kevin Doria. The pair have released one album, Shortwave Nights, by recording and combining instrumental and ambient sounds.

== History ==
Bryant, of the bands Godspeed You! Black Emperor and Set Fire to Flames, and Doria, of Growing and Total Life, first met and began working together in 2004; Bryant was the recording engineer for three Growing albums released between 2006 and 2008.

In 2008, Bryant and Doria worked together to create and record music for the Lausanne Underground Film and Music Festival. To identify music and experimental sounds recorded at this time and over the next several years, the duo began calling themselves Hiss Tracts.

Because both men were busy with other bands and projects, the arranging, mixing and layering of the Hiss Tracts recordings took place over a number of years. The first release under that name did not materialize until early 2014, when the group released a track, "Halo Getters", to promote the release of the full-length album Shortwave Nights.

Shortwave Nights was released by Constellation Records in May 2014. The album incorporated an eclectic mix of sound collage, ambient music, and noise music. The title track, "...shortwave nights" was eight minutes long and included post-rock guitar work as well as cello and electronic keyboard sounds.

== Discography ==
- Shortwave Nights (Constellation, 2014)
