= Fly Pan Am (album) =

Studio album by Fly Pan Am
- Released: October 20, 1999
- Recorded: Mom and Pop Sounds in Montreal, Spring 1999
- Genre: Post-rock, experimental rock
- Length: 60:18
- Label: Constellation CST008
- Producer: Ian Ilavsky

Fly Pan Am chronology
Lost in the House (1998)	Fly Pan Am (1999)	Sédatifs en fréquences et sillons (2000)

Fly Pan Am is the debut album of Canadian post-rock band Fly Pan Am. It was released in October 1999 by Constellation Records.

== Background ==
The album contains a re-recording of the song "L'espace au sol est redessiné par d'immenses panneaux bleus", which was featured on a split single in 1998 with Godspeed You! Black Emperor.

The record also features strange use of instruments and cadence, as well as electronic noises, provided by guest musician Alexandre St-Onge, that abruptly intersect the music. Their second album, titled Ceux qui inventent n'ont jamais vécu (?), employs the same electronic dissonance, but to a higher degree.

== Critical reception ==
Professional ratings
Review scores
Source	Rating
Allmusic	4.5/5 stars
Pitchfork	6.7/10
SputnikMusic	4/5 stars

Fly Pan Am has received positively by critics. AllMusic declared that "unlike some of their experimental [or] post-rock contemporaries, Fly Pan Am manages to be ambitious and engaging at once, creating forward-thinking, guitar-based music that is challenging but not intimidating". Pitchfork also praised the album's originality, stating that "if Mogwai weren't concerned with film directors and pop stars, they might make such bold statements".

== Track listing ==
No.	Title	Length
1.	"L'espace au sol est redessiné par d'immenses panneaux bleus..."	13:30
2.	"...Et aussi l'éclairage de plastique au centre de tous ces compartiments latéraux"	9:29
3.	"Dans ses cheveux soixante circuits"	17:45
4.	"Bibi à Nice, 1921"	9:58
5.	"Nice est en feu!"	9:36
Total length:		1:00:18

== Personnel ==
=== Fly Pan Am ===
- Jonathan Parant – guitar, tapes
- Felix Morel – drums, tapes
- Roger Tellier-Craig – guitar, tapes
- J.S. Truchy – bass guitar, tapes

=== Other musicians ===
- Alexandre St-Onge – electronics (on "Dans ses cheveux soixante circuits")
- Kara Lacy – vocals (on "Bibi à Nice, 1921" and "Nice est en feu!")
- Norsola Johnson – vocals (on "Bibi à Nice, 1921" and "Nice est en feu!")

=== Production ===
- Ian Ilavsky – record producer
- Andrew Frank – audio mastering
- Larry Cassini – audio mastering
- Harris Newman – audio mastering

== See also ==
- Avant-garde
- Music of Quebec
