= Exhaust =

Exhaust, exhaustive, or exhaustion may refer to:

== Law ==
- Exhaustion of intellectual property rights, limits to intellectual property rights in patent and copyright law
  - Exhaustion doctrine, in patent law
  - Exhaustion doctrine under U.S. law, in patent law
- Exhaustion of remedies, restrictions on opening a new lawsuit while an original suit is pending

== Mathematics ==
- Brute-force attack, a cryptanalytic attack, also known as exhaustive key search
- Collectively exhaustive, in probability and set theory, a collection of sets whose union equals the complete space
- Exhaustion by compact sets, in analysis, a sequence of compact sets that converges on a given set
- Method of exhaustion, in geometry, finding the area of a shape by approximating it with polygons
- Proof by exhaustion, proof by examining all individual cases

== Medicine ==
- Fatigue, a weariness caused by exertion
- Adrenal exhaustion or hypoadrenia, a hypothesized maladaptation of the adrenal glands
- Heat exhaustion or hyperthermia, a medical condition where the body is unable to control its accumulation of heat
- Nervous exhaustion or neurasthenia, a nineteenth-century diagnosis encompassing fatigue, anxiety, and depression

== Technology ==
- Exhaust, in steam engines, steam released from a cylinder
- Exhaust brake, a method of slowing diesel engines
- Exhaust gas, a gas which occurs as a result of combustion of fuel
- Exhaust manifold, a structure collecting an engine's exhaust outlets
- Exhaust system, a mechanism for venting exhaust gases from an internal combustion engine
- Exhaust velocity, a measure of engine efficiency
- Data exhaust, the trail of data left by users during online activity

== Other uses ==
- Emotional exhaustion
- Exhaust (band), a clarinet, drum, and tape trio in Montreal, Canada
  - Exhaust (album), the band's 1998 self-titled album
- Exhaust date, the projected date that a telecommunications area code will have assigned all of its numbers
- Exhaustive ballot, a multi-round voting system
