= Sings Reign Rebuilder =

Studio album by Set Fire to Flames
- Released: 9 October 2001
- Recorded: October 1999–January 2001
- Studio: "15 Ontario"
- Genres: Experimental; Free improvisation; Post-rock
- Length: 73:19
- Labels: Alien8; FatCat; P-Vine
- Producer: Set Fire to Flames

Set Fire to Flames chronology
Sings Reign Rebuilder (2001)	Telegraphs in Negative/Mouths Trapped in Static (2003)

Professional ratings
Review scores
Source	Rating
Allmusic	4/5 stars
Pitchfork Media	(9.0/10)
Almost Cool	7.5/10 stars

Sings Reign Rebuilder is the debut album by Canadian band Set Fire to Flames. It was released by Alien8 Recordings and FatCat Records on 9 October 2001.

The album's recording was heavily rooted in improvisation and usage of non-musical elements, and was conducted in a century-old house (either named or later dubbed 15 Ontario) apparently bound for destruction. From the liner notes:

"your bulldozers and wrecking ball can make match-sticks out of the rickety staircase and crookt/creaking floorboards---but they can't erase the recording that was made here."

As such, several sounds usually edited out of the recording process, including creaking floors, paper shuffling and outside noises, were left intact on the final album. The most notable occurrence is that of a police car driving by with its siren blaring at the end of "Love Song for 15 Ontario"; the vehicle was later credited as a guest performer on the song.

An underlying concept in the work is the "Lying Dying Wonder Body", which consists of spoken word passages dealing with philosophical and political concepts.

== Track listing ==
No.	Title	Length
1.	"'I Will Be True...' (From Lips of Lying Dying Wonder Body #1) / Reign Rebuilder [Head]"	2:39
2.	"Vienna Arcweld / Fucked Gamelan / Rigid Tracking"	13:45
3.	"Steal Compass / Drive North / Disappear"	6:12
4.	"Wild Dogs of the Thunderbolt / 'They Cannot Lock Me Up... I Am Eternally Free...' (From Lips of Lying Dying Wonder Body #2)"	4:54
5.	"Omaha"	6:16
6.	"There Is No Dance in Frequency and Balance"	4:16
7.	"Côte d'Abrahams Roomtone / 'What's Going On?...' (From Lips of Lying Dying Wonder Body #3)"	4:35
8.	"Love Song for 15 Ontario (w/ Singing Police Car)"	3:19
9.	"Injur: Gutted Two-Track"	2:49
10.	"When I First Get to Phoenix"	3:12
11.	"Shit-Heap-Gloria of the New Town Planning..."	10:50
12.	"Jesus / Pop"	1:42
13.	"Esquimalt Harbour"	2:16
14.	"Two Tears in a Bucket"	3:43
15.	"Fading Lights Are Fading... / Reign Rebuilder [Tail Out]"	2:51
Total length:		73:19

== Personnel ==
- Aidan Girt: drums
- Beckie Foon: cello
- Bruce Cawdron: drums/percussion
- Christof Migone: reel to reel motors/banjo/contact mics
- David Bryant: guitar
- Genevieve Heistek: viola
- Gordon Krieger: bass clarinet
- Jean-Sébastien Truchy: bass
- Mike Moya: guitar
- Roger Tellier-Craig: guitar
- Sophie Trudeau: violin
- Peter "Speedy" Weaver: guitar
- Thea Pratt: French horn
