= Quiet zone =

Quiet Zone may refer to:

- Radio quiet zone, an area where radio transmissions are restricted in order to protect a radio telescope or a communications station from radio frequency interference
  - The United States National Radio Quiet Zone in West Virginia, Virginia and Maryland
    - Quiet Zone (film), 2015 experimental documentary short film about people living in this zone
- The area before and after a barcode which is kept clear so that the barcode scanner can identify where the code starts and ends
- Railroad crossing quiet zone; in North America, a section of railroad track where trains are not required to sound their horns when approaching a grade (or level) crossing
- The Quiet Zone/The Pleasure Dome, album by British progressive rock band Van der Graaf Generator
