= David Bryant (musician) =

Canadian musician, recording engineer, and filmmaker

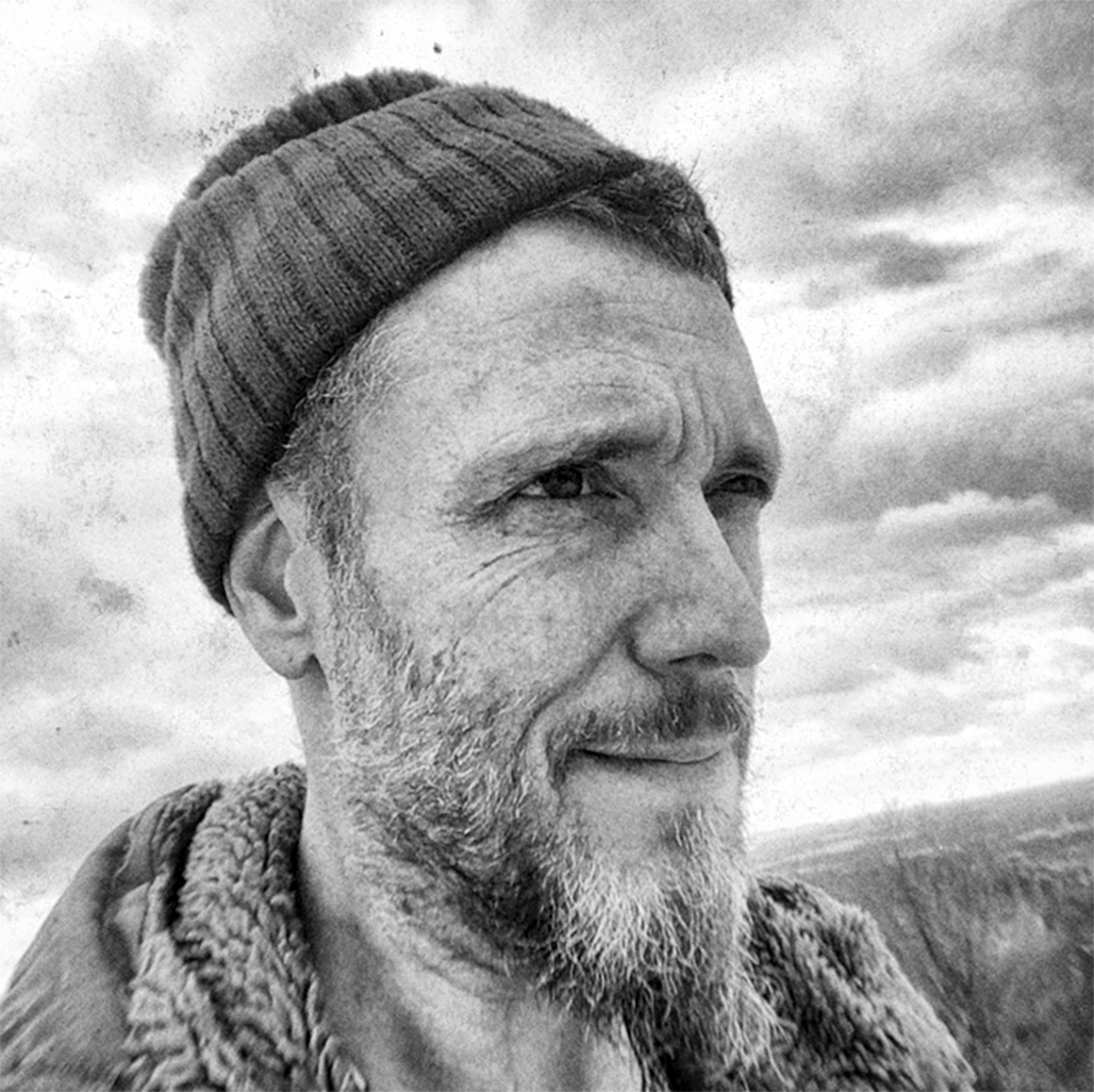
- David Bryant in 2015.

Background information
- Born: April 8, 1970 (age 56); Glasgow, Scotland
- Genres: Post-rock, drone music, film scores
- Occupations: Musician, recording engineer, film-maker
- Instruments: Guitar, tape loops
- Years active: 1997–present
- Labels: Constellation, Alien8 Recordings, FatCat Records

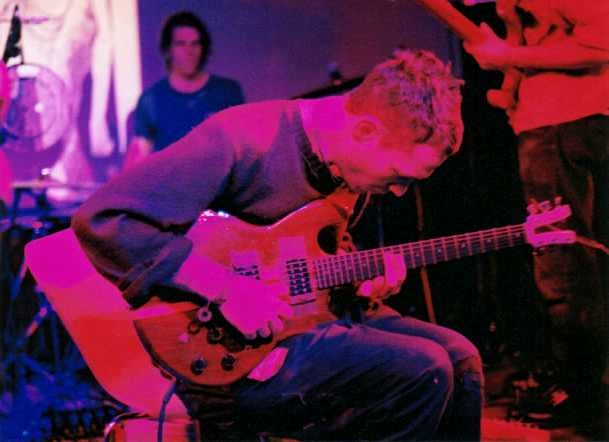
David Bryant playing guitar for Godspeed You! Black Emperor in 2000

David Bryant (born April 8, 1970) is a Canadian musician, recording engineer, and film-maker best known for being a member of Montreal-based bands Godspeed You! Black Emperor, Set Fire to Flames, and Hiss Tracts. In 2015, he co-directed the film Quiet Zone and has written music for other films.

== Biography ==
David Bryant joined Godspeed You! Black Emperor in 1997 as a third guitarist, later also doing recording, mixing, and photography for the band.

In 2001, David Bryant set up the experimental music project Set Fire to Flames combining post-rock with background noise and various other non-musical sound effects, creating a brooding, eerie, and minimalist sound.

During the 2003–2010 Godspeed hiatus Bryant met Kevin Doria, of the bands Growing and Total Life, and in 2008 they formed the band Hiss Tracts – named after a Set Fire to Flames song. Bryant was also the recording engineer for the three Growing albums released between 2006 and 2008.

In 2015, together with bandmate Karl Lemieux, Bryant directed the experimental documentary short film Quiet Zone. Together with Kevin Doria and Thierry Amar he has also written the score for Lemieux's 2016 feature film Shambles.

In 2017, Bryant collaborated with artist duo Kata Kovács and Tom O’Doherty on their "sound and extraterrestrial radio installation", Signal Tide, which was presented at the Los Angeles County Museum of Art in September 2017. The work combines composed and generative music with the live signal of the LES-1, an abandoned satellite.

== Discography ==
=== Bliss ===
- Grafted To An Elbow (1993)

=== Godspeed You! Black Emperor ===
- F♯ A♯ ∞ (1997, Constellation)
- aMAZEzine! 7" (1998, aMAZEzine!)
- Slow Riot for New Zero Kanada EP (1999, Constellation)
- Lift Your Skinny Fists Like Antennas to Heaven (2000, Constellation)
- Yanqui U.X.O. (2002, Constellation)
- 'Allelujah! Don't Bend! Ascend! (2012, Constellation)
- Asunder, Sweet and Other Distress (2015, Constellation)
- Luciferian Towers (2017, Constellation)
- G_d's Pee AT STATE'S END! (2021, Constellation)
- No Title as of 13 February 2024 28,340 Dead (2024, Constellation)

=== Set Fire to Flames ===
- Sings Reign Rebuilder (2001)
- Telegraphs in Negative/Mouths Trapped in Static (2003)
- Floored Memory….Fading Location (2009) includes "Steal Compass/Drive North/Disappear"
- Eleven into Fifteen: a 130701 Compilation (2016) includes "Barn Levitate"

=== Tim Hecker ===
- Mirages (2004)

=== Hiss Tracts ===
- Shortwave Nights (Constellation, 2014)

== Filmography ==
=== As director ===
- Quiet Zone (2015)
