= Volatile Works =

Canadian film and new media art collective

- Volatile Works

Background information
- Origin: Montreal, Quebec, Canada
- Years active: 2003–present
- Members: Lou; MDB; Pomgrenade; Urchin; Witkacy
- Website: volatileworks.org

Volatile Works is a five-member film and new media art collective in Montreal, Quebec established in 2003.

== Activities ==
The Volatile Works collective has produced works in diverse mediums, genres, and styles, with an emphasis on do-it-yourself forms of production. Their works have appeared in over 140 film and new media art festivals in over 28 countries around the world. The collective organizes regular short film screenings, and has collaborated with other collectives and musicians on community-based screenings, workshops in activist video, 16 mm & Super-8 projections, and music videos. Their media include digital video, Super-8, 16mm, animation, web art, sound, installation art, and live performances. In 2007, they were named "Noisemakers" by the Montreal Mirror.

From La Revue de la Cinémathèque Québécoise (Sept-Dec. 2007), by Domique Dugas: "Volatile Works is composed of five very strong and distinct signatures, from Witcaky's experimental films that cross avant-garde accents with surrealism, to DeGiglio-Bellemare's B-movie and horror film explorations seasoned with agitprop perspectives, to Pomgrenade's anti-militarism and politically engaged cinema." (Translated from the French).

== Collective screenings ==
- Curated screening at the invitation of Versionfest >05: Volatile Shorts Film Program (Chicago, USA), April 2005
- Collective screening at the invitation of the Cinémathèque Québécoise: Volatile Works Does the Cinémathèque! (Montréal, Canada), November 23, 2007
- Retrospective screening at the invitation of Fantasia Festival (Montréal, Canada), July 11, 2007
- Curated screening at the invitation of New York Experimental: Volatile Works Collective Does New York! (New York, USA), March 24, 2007
- "Live" projections with musicians at the invitation of the Rendez-vous du cinéma Québécois: Soirée Tryptique avec Volatile Works, Karl Lemieux, et Pierre Hébert (Montréal, Canada), February 22, 2008

== Collective awards ==
- 2005: Awarded the special flEXiff Award for five of its films at The First and Last Experimental International Film Festival, Sydney, Australia: House, Kuleshov's Cabinet, NatoNosferatu, Resettlement [floating home], and Zombie Business.
- 2007: Awarded the special MUFF Award for four of its films at the Second Montreal Underground Film Festival, Montreal, Quebec, Canada: Ikuma Siku, Kuleshov's Paradox, Lust, and Uncanny.

== Individual awards ==
- 2005: Zombie Business (Mario DeGiglio-Bellemare - 3rd Place, Best Québécois DIY Shorts, at the Fantasia Film Festival, Montréal, Canada.
- 2005: Zombie Business (Mario DeGiglio-Bellemare) - Best Director Award (Shorts category), at the International Festival of Horror, Cincinnati, USA.
- 2005: Donkey Harvest (Allan Brown) - Best of the Fest, at the Bearded Child Film Festival, Grand Rapids, Minnesota, USA.
- 2006: Donkey Harvest (Allan Brown) - Coppa Cannibale Award, at the 19th Stuttgart Filmwinter, Germany.
- 2006: Donkey Harvest (Allan Brown) - Meilleur Ambiance/Prix du Public, at Vitesse Lumière, Québec, Canada.
- 2011: Main Attraction (Mario DeGiglio-Bellemare) - Special flEXiff Award, at The First and Last Experimental International Film Festival, Sydney, Australia.
- 2011: Kinetosis (Allan Brown) - Festival Prize Winner, at the Alternative Film/Video 2011 Festival, Belgrade, Serbia.
