= C'est ça =

Studio album by Le Fly Pan Am
- Released: September 20, 2019
- Recorded: 2019
- Studio: Hotel2Tango
- Genre: Post-rock experimental rock
- Length: 38:58
- Label: Constellation CST147
- Producer: Radwan Ghazi Moumneh

Le Fly Pan Am chronology
N'écoutez pas (2004)	C'est ça (2019)

C'est ça (English: That's It) is the fourth studio album by the Québécois band Fly Pan Am. It was released by Constellation Records in September 20, 2019. It is the band's first record after their 2018 reunion for a live show in Montreal, following a hiatus of 14 years.

The album was recorded, produced and mixed by Radwan Ghazi Moumneh at the Hotel2Tango in 2019, and mastered by Harris Newman at Grey Market Mastering.

The artwork was produced by guitarist Jonathan Parant, with graphic design and typography by Feed. The album was released digitally, in CD and in vinyl. The vinyl version comes with a poster.

== Track listing ==
1. "Avant-gardez vous" – 1:19
2. "Distance Dealer" – 4:09
3. "Bleeding Decay" – 5:36
4. "Dizzy Delusions" – 1:50
5. "Each Ether" – 5:06
6. "Alienage Syntropy" – 1:59
7. "One Hit Wonder" – 6:57
8. "Discreet Channeling" – 6:25
9. "Interface Your Shattered Dreams" – 5:37

== Personnel ==
=== Le Fly Pan Am ===
- Jonathan Parant – guitars, synthesizers, electronics, vocals
- Roger Tellier-Craig – guitars, electronics, vocals
- Jean-Sébastien Truchy – bass guitar, electronics, synthesizers, mellotron, vocals
- Felix Morel – drums, scrap cymbals

=== Production ===
- Radwan Ghazi Moumneh – production, mixing, recording
- Harris Newman – mastering
