= L'éclat du ciel était insoutenable =

Studio album by Hrsta
- Released: November 20, 2001
- Recorded: Hotel2Tango
- Genre: Post-rock; Experimental music
- Length: 55:27
- Label: Alien8 / Fancy FANCY3

Hrsta chronology
L'éclat du ciel était insoutenable (2001)	Stem Stem in Electro (2005)

Professional ratings
Review scores
Source	Rating
Pitchfork Media	(5.9/10)

L'éclat du ciel était insoutenable is the first album by the Canadian post-rock band Hrsta. The cover uses a photograph by Michael Semak.

== Track listing ==
1. "L'éclat du ciel était insoutenable" ["The Glare of the Sky Was Unbearable"]
2. "Lime Kiln"
3. "Don't Let the Angels Fall"
4. "City of Gold"
5. "I Can Transform Myself Into Anyone I Want"
6. "Jakominiplatz"
7. "21-87"
8. "Silver Planes"
9. "Blessed Are We Who Seem to Be Losers"
10. "Lucy's Sad"
11. "City of Gold (Reprise)"
12. "Whip"
13. "Novi Beograd" [New Belgrade]
