= Kicker in Tow =

Kicker In Tow

Studio album by Hangedup
- Released: 2002
- Recorded: Winter 2001–2002
- Genre: Post-rock
- Length: 47:17
- Label: Constellation Records

Hangedup chronology
Hangedup (2001)	Kicker In Tow (2002)	Clatter For Control (2005)

Kicker In Tow is Hangedup's second album, released in the fall of 2002 on Montreal's Constellation Records label. It was released on CD and LP, catalogue number Constellation # CST022-1.

== Track listing ==
1. "Kinetic Work"
2. "Sink"
3. "Losing Your Charm"
4. "View From the Ground"
5. "Moment For The Motion Machine"
6. "No More Bad Future"
7. "Motorcycle Muffler"
8. "Automatic Spark Control"
9. "Broken Reel"
