= N'écoutez pas =

Studio album by Le Fly Pan Am
- Released: 6 September 2004
- Recorded: April 2004
- Studio: The Hotel2Tango, Montreal, Quebec, Canada
- Genre: Post-rock; experimental rock
- Length: 48:17
- Label: Constellation
- Producer: Thierry Amar

Le Fly Pan Am chronology
Ceux qui inventent n'ont jamais vécu (?) (2002)	N'écoutez pas (2004)	C'est ça (2019)

Professional ratings
Review scores
Source	Rating
AllMusic	4.5/5 stars
Pitchfork Media	8.0/10

N'écoutez pas (French for 'Do Not Listen') is the third studio album by the Québécois band Fly Pan Am, credited on this album as Le Fly Pan Am. It was released by Constellation Records on 6 September 2004.

The album was recorded and mixed by Thierry Amar at the Hotel2Tango in April 2004. It features long-time contributor Alexandre St-Onge helping with the fifth track.

The artwork was produced by the band. The liner notes include the album credits, mentions of guest musicians, and notes of gratitude.

== Track listing ==
1. "Brûlez suivant, suivante!" ("Burn Next, Next") – 4:26
2. "Ex éleveurs de renards argentés" ("Ex-Breeders of Silver Foxes") – 2:02
3. "Autant zig-zag" ("As much Zig-Zag") – 11:02
4. "Buvez nos larmes de métal" ("Drink Our Metal Tears") – 1:37
5. "Pas à pas step until" ("Step Up to Step") – 5:26
6. "..." – 2:12
7. "Très très 'retro'" ("Very Very 'Retro") – 11:02
8. "Vos rêves revers" ("Your Setback Dreams") – 6:04
9. "Ce sale désir éfilé qui sortant de ma bouche" ("This Dirty Fringed Desire Out of My Mouth") – 3:08
10. "Le faux pas aimer vous souhaite d'être follement ami" ("The Misstep Like You Want To Be Madly Friend") – 1:18

== Personnel ==
=== Le Fly Pan Am ===
- Jonathan Parant – guitar, organ, piano, vocals, electronics, tapes
- Felix Morel – drums, vocals, electronics, tapes
- Roger Tellier-Craig – guitar, organ, vocals, electronics, tapes
- J.S. Truchy – bass guitar, vocals, electronics, tapes
- Eric Gingras - guitar, organ, voice

=== Other musicians ===
- Dominique Petrin – vocals (on "Très très 'retro'")
- Tim Hecker – electronics (on "Très très 'retro'")
- Catherine Lemay – vocals (on "...")
- Alexandre St-Onge – electronics (on "Pas à pas step until")
- Les Bonzai Kittens – vocals (on "Le faux pas aimer vous souhaite d'être follement ami")

=== Production ===
- Thierry Amar – record producer, audio mixing
- Harris Newman – audio mastering
