= Hangedup (album) =

Studio album by Hangedup
- Released: May 21/29, 2001
- Recorded: 1999–2000 at Hotel2Tango
- Genre: Post-rock
- Length: 43:59
- Label: Constellation Records

Hangedup chronology
Hangedup (2001)	Kicker In Tow (2002)

Hangedup is the self-titled album by Hangedup. It was released in May 2001 on Constellation Records. Its catalog number is CST016.

Ian Ilavsky plays bass on tracks 3 and 8. Efrim Menuck provides additional overdubs on Bring Yr Scuba Gear.

== Track listing ==
1. "Winternational"
2. "Propane Tank"
3. "Powered By Steam"
4. "New Blue Monday" (title on the insert; the inside cover calls it "New Blue Order")
5. "Tapping"
6. "Czech Disco Pt.II"
7. "Wilt"
8. "Bring Yr Scuba Gear"
