= See You on the Moon!: Songs for Kids of All Ages =

See You on the Moon!

Compilation album by Various artists
- Released: 2006
- Genre: Indie rock
- Label: Paper Bag

See You on the Moon!: Songs for Kids of All Ages is a compilation album, released in 2006 on Paper Bag Records. The album features a number of indie rock artists, mostly but not exclusively from Canada, performing songs written in the style of children's songs.

Most tracks are original songs written by the artists themselves, although Sufjan Stevens and Broken Social Scene contributed covers of famous children's songs

The album's title track, by Great Lake Swimmers, was named one of the best Canadian songs of 2006 on the CBC Radio 3 podcast.

== Track listing ==
1. Alan Sparhawk, "Be Nice to People with Lice"
2. Great Lake Swimmers, "See You on the Moon!"
3. Sufjan Stevens, "The Friendly Beasts"
4. Montag, "Kiddo 1"
5. Apostle of Hustle, "24 Robbers"
6. Junior Boys, "Max"
7. Broken Social Scene, "Puff the Magic Dragon"
8. The FemBots, "Under the Bed"
9. Montag, "Kiddo 3"
10. Glissandro 70, "Voices Are Your Best Friend"
11. Mark Kozelek, "Leo and Luna"
12. Detective Kalita, "Baby Brother"
13. Montag, "Kiddo 2"
14. Hot Chip, "I Can't Wake Up"
15. Kid Koala & Lederhosen Lucil, "Fruit Belt"
16. Montag, "Bonne Nuit Étienne"
17. Rosie Thomas, "Faith's Silver Elephant"
