= Last Ex =

Last Ex is a Canadian experimental musical duo composed of Olivier Fairfield and Simon Trottier. The pair released one self-titled album.

== History ==
Simon Trottier and Olivier Fairfield (also of the group Timber Timbre) had worked on a soundtrack to a horror film, The Last Exorcism Part II, in 2012, but their music ended up not being used in the film. The pair reworked the unused material and recorded parts with other members of Timber Timbre at a studio Fairfield owned. The tracks included analogue tape loops and some melodic lines from violinist Mika Posen. Constellation Records released the album under the Last Ex moniker in October 2014, only a few months after the release of Timber Timbre's album Hot Dreams.

During October and November 2014, Last Ex opened shows headlined by Timber Timbre in the United Kingdom, France, Italy, Switzerlands, and the Netherlands. The band then did some performing in Ontario and Quebec through 2015, including an appearance at Toronto's Wavelength Festival.

== Discography ==
- Last Ex (Constellation Records, 2014)
