= Clatter for Control =

Studio album by Hangedup
- Released: April 18, 2005
- Recorded: 2003–2004 at Hotel2Tango
- Genre: Post-rock
- Length: 42:56
- Label: Constellation Records

Hangedup chronology
Kicker in Tow (2002)	Clatter for Control (2005)

Clatter for Control is Hangedup's third album, released in April 2005 by Constellation Records. Its catalog number is CST034.

Harris Newman, who mastered the album, plays bass with the duo on track 8.

== Track listing ==
1. "Klang Klang"
2. "Alarm"
3. "A Different Kind of Function"
4. "Kick-Back-Hub"
5. "Eksplozije"
6. "Go Let's Go"
7. "Derailleur"
8. "Fuck This Place"
9. "How We Keep Time"
10. "Junk the Clatter"
