= Astrid Klein =

German artist

Astrid Klein (born 1951) is a German contemporary artist. Klein works in a variety of mediums including drawing, painting, text, photography and installation and sculpture.

== Biography ==
Astrid Klein studied at the Academy of Art and Design in Cologne Köln International School of Design from 1973 to 1977. In 1986 she was visiting professor at the University of Fine Arts in Hamburg, and from 1993 to 2017 she was professor of fine arts at the Academy of Visual Arts in Leipzig. The artist has received a variety of awards including the Käthe Kollwitz Prize in 1997 and the Cologne Fine Art Award in 2001. Astrid Klein is married to Don Nikos Marquis Araldi of Piadena. The artist lives and works in Cologne, Germany and Recanati, Italy.

== Work ==
Astrid Klein first became known in the 1970s for her large-format, black-and-white ‘photoworks’ [Fotoarbeiten] and expansive installations, created in a complex process that involves combining found images and textual material with painted and drawn elements. Klein's art is noted for its intellectual acuity, emotional intensity and cool aesthetic. Developed over more than four decades of artistic practice, her oeuvre also encompasses paintings in black and white, collages, neon sculptures, mirror works, transparencies and early text-based images [Schriftbilder]. The relationship between image and text is a persistent theme and source of inspiration in Klein's work, and is also explored in the neon sculptures she began making in 1991. These intricate structures consist of neon tubes imprinted with text fragments from literary and philosophical sources. While their linear forms are reminiscent of drawings, the neon pieces also extend the principle of collage into the third dimension. With these works, Klein enquires into the nature of the real and highlights the discrepancy that exists between appearance and reality.

Astrid Klein adopts the same deconstructive approach, informed by psychoanalysis, feminism and linguistics, in her work in other media. For example, her White Paintings [Weiße Bilder] (1988–93) – images rendered in white on white – serve to make the invisible visible. But no matter what medium she selects, Klein always centres her work around the viewer, as her primary concern is to create a space for reflection and critical engagement between the viewer and the picture or sculpture.

Through her art, Klein seeks not only to visualise and undermine dominant power structures and representational mechanisms, but also to dismantle them and to destabilise conventional imagery. Her compelling works often prompt a surprising moment of reflection, encouraging viewers to think about their own social constructs and ways of being in the world. Purity and elegance are coupled with a seismographic sensitivity for critical contemporary issues, such as the role of women in society or notions of success and failure, as well as broader themes of remembering and forgetting, time and transience. Reflecting her wide-ranging interests in literature, film, philosophy, perception theory and neuroscience, Klein's artworks open up aesthetic and intellectual realms for viewers to experience and explore.

=== Photoworks ===
Klein began working with photography in 1978. Her early works were based on themes of human tragedy and often combined texts with images.

Klein produces photographic images on a large scale to make what she refers to as ‘photoworks’, distinguishing them from straightforward photographs. Starting with images drawn from newspapers and magazines, Klein transforms them with a variety of processing and printing techniques in the darkroom, often verging on abstraction. The resulting works question assumptions about photography as an accurate documentary medium.

Her photography work is in the permanent collection of the Tate.

== Exhibitions and collections ==
Astrid Klein's work has been the subject of numerous solo exhibitions at museums and art institutions, most recently at the Falckenberg Collection/Deichtorhallen, Hamburg-Harburg (2018); and at The Renaissance Society, Chicago (2017). Solo exhibitions of her work have also been shown at Hamburger Bahnhof, Berlin (2002); Contemporary Art Centre, Vilnius (2003); Neues Museum, Staatliches Museum für Kunst und Design, Nuremberg (2001); Kunsthalle Bielefeld (1989); Kestnergesellschaft, Hanover (1989); ICA, London (1989); Secession, Vienna (1989) and Museum of Modern Art San Francisco (1988).

The Pinakothek der Moderne in Munich is currently presenting works by Klein from the museum collection in the exhibition “Astrid Klein. Dass vollkommene Liebe die Angst austreibe (That perfect love drive out fear)”, which continues until January 2021.

Astrid Klein participated in the 14th Sharjah Biennial (2019), documenta 8 (1987) and the 42nd Venice Biennale (1986).

Her work is held in numerous public and private collections around the world, including:

Bundeskunstsammlung – Sammlung der Bundesrepublik Deutschland; Falckenberg Collection/Deichtorhallen, Hamburg-Harburg; Fundación ‘la Caixa’, Madrid; Hamburger Bahnhof – Museum für Gegenwart, Berlin; Hamburger Kunsthalle, Hamburg; Kunstmuseum Bonn; Kunstsammlungen – Museen der Stadt Nürnberg, Nuremberg; Museum der bildenden Künste, Leipzig; Museum Folkwang, Essen; Museum Ludwig, Cologne; Museum Ostwall, Dortmund; Pinakothek der Moderne, Munich; San Francisco Museum of Modern Art; Sharjah Art Foundation; Tate, London; Schaufler Foundation, Schauwerk Sindelfingen; Victoria and Albert Museum, London; Viehof Collection, Mönchengladbach.
