= Esmerine =

Canadian musical group

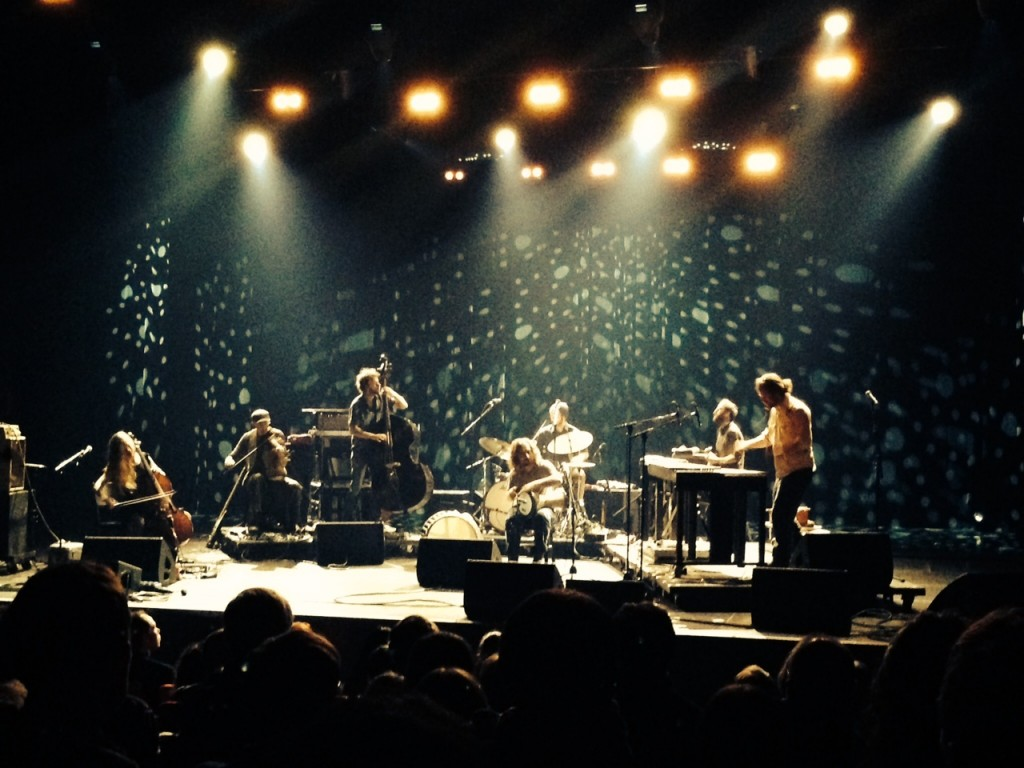

Background information
- Origin: Montreal, Quebec, Canada
- Genres: Chamber music; post-rock; indie rock; folk
- Years active: 2003–present
- Labels: Constellation, Madrona, Resonant
- Members: Bruce Cawdron, Beckie Foon, Brian Sanderson
- Past members: Sarah Pagé, Andrew Barr
- Website: esmerine.com

Esmerine is a Canadian modern chamber music group that incorporates genres such as post-rock, drone music, post-punk, and Turkish folk. Founded in Montreal in 2000 by Bruce Cawdron (drums) and Beckie Foon (cello), the band has released six albums.

== History ==
=== 2000–2002: Founding ===
The chamber rock group Esmerine was formed in 2000 and was initially a duo consisting of percussionist Bruce Cawdron and cellist Beckie Foon. The two had recently met in Montreal while both were recording the debut album of Canadian post-rock band Set Fire To Flames. Cawdron and Foon had independently contributed to other Montreal based groups as well, notably Godspeed You! Black Emperor, Thee Silver Mt. Zion Memorial Orchestra & Tra-La-La Band, Saltland, Fifths of Seven, and Mile-End Ladies' String Auxiliary. However, instead of using the guitar-focused sound of their other projects, the duo initially focused on percussion and cello, drawing on minimalist classical music and chamber music. The band initially performed their original music in gigs around Montreal.

=== 2003–2010: Early releases ===
Esmerine recorded and released their debut album If Only a Sweet Surrender to the Nights to Come Be True in May 2003. It came out on the UK label Resonant Records, as well as the band's newly formed Madrona Records imprint. Allmusic gave it 4/5 stars.

In 2004, the duo recorded their second album at the Hotel2Tango studio in Montreal. They released Aurora in May 2005 on Madrona Records, with a vinyl version released by Ninja Tune. In the mid-2000s, Foon dedicated more time to Thee Silver Mt. Zion, while Cawdron continued to work as an acupuncturist. At the same time, they continued to occasionally perform in Montreal, often bringing in guest artists or collaborating with other groups.

=== 2011: La Lechuza ===
Foon and Cawdron began writing new music together in earnest in 2010. For their third album, La Lechuza, two new members joined the group: Sarah Pagé, a harp player, and multi-instrumentalist Andrew Barr (both of The Barr Brothers and the Lhasa de Sela band). Album producer Patrick Watson also contributed vocals on two songs, with other guests including violinist Sarah Neufeld (Arcade Fire) and saxophonist Colin Stetson. Mark Lawson of Arcade Fire mixed most of the tracks.

=== 2012–2014: Dalmak ===
Recording process

After Barr and Page became occupied with their other projects, Esmerine added two new members to their touring lineup: percussionist Jamie Thompson and multi-instrumentalist Brian Sanderson.

After a number of live performances, the quartet began writing new material in early 2012. After performing in Istanbul, the band was invited to return for an artist residency later that year. After turning a rented loft into a makeshift recording studio, the band recorded for two days in Istanbul. The band's "song skeletons" were added to by Turkish musicians, who contributed instruments such as the bendir, darbuka, erbane, mey, barama, saz and electric guitar. Among the guest musicians were Hakan Vreskala, Baran Aşık, Ali Kazim Akdağ, and James Hakan Dedeoğlu.

The album, Dalmak, was completed in the winter of 2012 and 2013 at Breakglass Studios in Montreal with engineer Jace Lasek.

Reception

Dalmak was released on Constellation Records in 2013. It was awarded Instrumental Album of the Year at the Juno Awards of 2014. Tiny Mix Tapes gave Dalmak a score of 3/5. The review described the album as starting off with the band's normal style, before Turkish influences started to dominate in tracks such as "Lost River Blues II." The Line of Best Fit gave it 7.5/10 stars.

=== 2015: Lost Voices ===
Lost Voices was released on Constellation Records in 2015, earning their second Juno Awards nomination as Instrumental Album of the Year in 2016. The band composed the record at Le Chateau Monthelon in Montreal, France.

=== 2017: Mechanics of Dominion ===
Mechanics of Dominion is the sixth studio album by Canadian band Esmerine, released on October 20, 2017, through Constellation Records.

=== 2022: Everything Was Forever Until It Was No More ===
Esmerine released their album Everything Was Forever Until It Was No More on May 6, 2022. The record was awarded Instrumental Album of the Year at the Juno Awards of 2023.

== Style, live performances ==
Esmerine announced a series of tour dates for 2023, including around Europe and performances at the Live at Lost River Festival in Wentworth-Nord, QC (August 24-27) put on by Patrick Watson and Rebecca Foon.

Decoder Magazine has described Esmerine as "new-classical, punk-drone-post rock." As a "chamber rock" ensemble, Esmerine's music consists mainly of percussion, cello, and marimba, lacking the guitars prominent in the members' other side projects. Esmerine's style shares many characteristics with minimalist classical music and chamber music.

== Members ==
Current

- Bruce Cawdron (2000–present) - marimba, drums, melodic percussion
- Beckie Foon (2000–present) - cello
- Brian Sanderson (2011–present) - multiple instruments

Past

- Jamie Thompson (2011–2020) - drums, percussion
- Sarah Pagé (2010–2011) - harp
- Andrew Barr (2010–2011) - multiple instruments

== Awards ==
Year	Award	Nominated work	Category	Result
2014	Juno Awards	Dalmak	Instrumental Album of the Year	Won
2016	Juno Awards	Lost Voices	Instrumental Album of the Year	Nominated
2016	Juno Awards	Lost Voices	Recording Package of the Year	Won
2018	Juno Awards	Mechanics of Dominion	Recording Package of the Year	Nominated
2023	Juno Awards	Everything Was Forever Until It Was No More	Instrumental Album of the Year	Won
2023	Juno Awards	Everything Was Forever Until It Was No More	Recording Package of the Year	Won

== Discography ==
=== Studio albums ===
Studio albums by Esmerine
Year	Album title	Release details
2003	If Only a Sweet Surrender to the Nights to Come Be True	Released: May 20, 2003; Label: Madrona/Resonant; Format: CD, LP, digital
2005	Aurora	Released: May 31, 2005; Label: Madrona/Ninja Tune; Format: CD, LP, digital
2011	La Lechuza	Released: December 20, 2011; Label: Constellation; Format: CD, LP, digital
2013	Dalmak	Released: September 3, 2013; Label: Constellation; Format: CD, LP, digital
2015	Lost Voices	Released: October 16, 2015; Label: Constellation; Format: CD, LP, digital
2017	Mechanics of Dominion	Released: October 20, 2017; Label: Constellation; Format: CD, LP, digital
2022	Everything Was Forever Until It Was No More	Released: May 6, 2022; Label: Constellation; Format: CD, LP, digital

=== Singles ===
Incomplete list of songs by Esmerine
Year	Title	Album	Release notes
2012	"Front End Loader"	2 track single	Constellation Records (May 2012)
