= Like Hearts Swelling =

Studio album by Polmo Polpo
- Released: September 22, 2003
- Recorded: Sandro Perri's home in Toronto, spring 2000–2003
- Genre: Post-rock; Dark ambient Ambient techno
- Length: 46:53
- Label: Constellation CST026
- Producer: Sandro Perri

Polmo Polpo chronology
The Science of Breath (2002)	Like Hearts Swelling (2003)	Kiss Me Again and Again (2005)

Professional ratings
Review scores
Source	Rating
Tiny Mix Tapes	5/5 stars
Pitchfork Media	(7.8/10)

Like Hearts Swelling is a 2003 album by Polmo Polpo. This album is the first release by Polmo Polpo after switching to Constellation Records.

The third track, "Farewell", was played by John Peel on BBC Radio 1. Tracks 1, 2 and 4 were remixed mainly acoustically for the album Plays Polmo Polpo, Sandro Perri's first album under his own name.

== Track listing ==
1. "Romeo Heart" – 7:55
2. "Requiem for a Fox" – 11:04
3. "Farewell" – 5:04
4. "Sky Histoire" – 13:10
5. "Like Hearts Swelling" – 9:40
