= Tiny Mirrors =

Studio album by Sandro Perri
- Released: 24 September 2007 (Europe), 9 October 2007 (Rest of World)
- Recorded: Toronto, Oct. 2005 – Oct. 2006
- Length: 41:43
- Label: Constellation Records CST047

Sandro Perri chronology
Plays Polmo Polpo (2006)	Tiny Mirrors (2007)	Impossible Spaces (2011)

Professional ratings
Review scores
Source	Rating
Sputnikmusic	3.5/5

Tiny Mirrors is the first full-length recording by Sandro Perri. It was released in 2007 via Constellation Records.

== Critical reception ==
PopMatters wrote that the album "initially sounds like coffee shop fodder, but reveals itself to be nothing so timid and plain." Exclaim! wrote: "Daring and remarkably coherent, Tiny Mirrors is the prettiest art rock record out of Toronto's underground in years." Pitchfork called the album "tropically tranquil."

== Track listing ==
1. "Family Tree" - 3:36
2. "City of Museums" - 3:06
3. "Double Suicide" - 5:49
4. "The Drums" - 3:27
5. "Everybody's Talkin'" - 4:50
6. "The Mime" - 4:18
7. "You're the One" - 4:38
8. "White Flag Blues" - 4:43
9. "Love Is Real" - 4:30
10. "Mirror Tree" - 2:39
