= The Science of Breath =

Studio album by Polmo Polpo
- Released: 2002
- Genre: Dark ambient, ambient techno
- Length: 46:59
- Label: Substractif SUBSF05
- Producer: Sandro Perri

Polmo Polpo chronology
The Science of Breath (2002)	Like Hearts Swelling (2003)

Professional ratings
Review scores
Source	Rating
Allmusic	4/5 stars

The Science of Breath is a 2002 album by Sandro Perri under the name Polmo Polpo. Fusing dark ambient and ambient techno music, the record was well-received critically. It was followed in 2003 by Like Hearts Swelling.

The album cover is adorned with an underwater photo of an octopus. The pieces themselves, as implied by the title and artwork, are very "watery". They make heavy use of muffled but driving 4/4 rhythms, distorted feedback, and echoing synths or guitars. The music has been described as "opaque" and "darkly aquatic". There is also a recurring breathing motif.

In a manner akin to Boards of Canada, The Science of Breath alternates longer, more fully developed tracks with shorter ambient pieces. In this case the ambient pieces are "High Breathing", "Mid Breathing", "Low Breathing" and "Complete Breath". Each of these pieces is deeper in pitch than the last, giving the listener the impression of a deep-sea dive.

== Track listing ==
1. "High Breathing" – 2:12
2. "Oarca" – 9:52
3. "Mid Breathing" – 2:33
4. "Acqua" – 9:10
5. "Low Breathing" – 1:42
6. "Rottura" – 6:59
7. "Complete Breath" – 3:03
8. "Riva" – 11:28
