= Mechanics of Dominion =

Studio album by Esmerine
- Released: October 20, 2017
- Length: 44:42
- Label: Constellation

Esmerine chronology
Lost Voices (2015)	Mechanics of Dominion (2017)	Everything Was Forever Until It Was No More (2022)

Professional ratings
Aggregate scores
Source	Rating
Metacritic	83/100
Review scores
Source	Rating
Exclaim!	9/10
The Line of Best Fit	8/10
MusicOMH	4/5 stars
PopMatters	8/10

Mechanics of Dominion is the sixth studio album by Canadian band Esmerine. It was released on October 20, 2017 through Constellation Records.

== Track listing ==
No.	Title	Length
1.	"The Space in Between"	3:46
2.	"La Lucha es una Sola"	8:27
3.	"La Pénombre"	4:29
4.	"La Plume des Armes"	5:15
5.	"¡Que Se Vayan Todos!"	5:38
6.	"Mechanics of Dominion"	7:28
7.	"Northeast Kingdom"	6:59
8.	"Piscibus Maris"	2:40
