= Glissandro 70 =

Canadian Afrobeat band

Glissandro 70 is a Canadian Afrobeat band based in Toronto, Ontario. Its members are Craig Dunsmuir (a.k.a. Kanada 70, Guitarkestra) and Sandro Perri (a.k.a. Polmpo Polpo), who play a blend of dance and experimental rock styles.

== History ==
Dunsmuir and Perri began by creating music for an audio weblog. They continued to collaborate intermittently over a period of three years, beginning in 2004, and released their self-titled five-track debut album on Constellation Records in 2006, to positive reviews. Although the two musicians also play rock music together in another of Perri's bands, the musical style of this project is more dance-oriented. The album appeared on the !earshot campus and community radio charts in April that year.

Glissandro 70 also contributed a track, "Voices Are Your Best Friend", to the children's compilation album See You on the Moon!, released by Paper Bag Records.

== Discography ==
- Glissandro 70 (2006)
- G70 2: Bones Of Dundasa (2026)
