= If Only a Sweet Surrender to the Nights to Come Be True =

Studio album by Esmerine
- Released: May 20, 2003
- Genre: Chamber music, post-rock
- Length: 50:27
- Label: Resonant Recordings

Esmerine chronology
If Only a Sweet Surrender to the Nights to Come Be True (2003)	Aurora (2005)

Professional ratings
Review scores
Source	Rating
Allmusic	4/5 stars
Pitchfork Media	(7.5/10)

If Only a Sweet Surrender to the Nights to Come Be True is the debut album by Esmerine. It was released on June 2, 2003.

== Track listing ==
1. "Red Fire Farm" - 4:33
2. "There Were No Footprints in the Dust Behind Them..." - 12:27
3. "Nohna's Lullaby" - 5:43
4. "Where There Is No Love There Is No Justice" - 5:52
5. "Tungsten" - 5:30
6. "Sweet Surrender Be True" - 7:49
7. "Luna Park" - 1:26
8. "Marvellous Engines of Resistance" – 7:07
