= Ceux qui inventent n'ont jamais vécu (?) =

Studio album by Le Fly Pan Am
- Released: April 1, 2002
- Recorded: September 2000 – August 2001
- Studio: Hotel2Tango, Montreal
- Genre: Post-rock; Experimental rock
- Length: 44:31
- Label: Constellation CST019
- Producer: Thierry Amar; Efrim Menuck

Le Fly Pan Am chronology
Sédatifs en fréquences et sillons (2000)	Ceux qui inventent n'ont jamais vécu (?) (2002)	N'écoutez pas (2004)

Professional ratings
Review scores
Source	Rating
AllMusic	3/5 stars
Pitchfork	(6.0/10)

Ceux qui inventent n'ont jamais vécu (?) (Those who invent have never lived (?)) is the second album by Fly Pan Am. It was released by Constellation Records in April 2002.

The album, as stated by Constellation Records, has a recurrent theme of "self-sabotage". Electronic noises and textures disrupt and often serve to confuse the listener; the track "Sound-support surface noises reaching out to you" includes sounds mimicking a skipping CD. Alexandre St-Onge, long-time contributor to Fly Pan Am, provides electronic manipulation for the second track.

The recording also includes input and performances from many musicians, including David Bryant and Bruce Cawdron from Godspeed You! Black Emperor and Sam Shalabi from Shalabi Effect. The taping and mixing was done at the communal Montreal-based Hotel2Tango in 2001 by Thierry Amar and Efrim Menuck. The artwork was produced by the band members.

The album title may refer to a sentence pronounced in Gil J. Wolman's film L'Anticoncept.

== Track listing ==
1. "Jeunesse sonique, tu dors (en cage)" ("Sonic Youth, You Sleep (In a Cage)") – 1:32
2. "Rompre l'indifférence de l'inexitable avant que l'on vienne rompre le sommeil de l'inanimé" ("Break the Indifference of the Inevitable Before We Come to Break the Sleep of the Inanimate") – 10:53
3. "Partially sabotaged distraction partiellement sabotée" ("Partially Sabotaged Distraction Partially Sabotaged") – 4:15
4. "Univoque/Équivoque" ("Univocal / Equivocal") – 5:41
5. "Arcades-Pamelor" – 3:41
6. "Sound-support surface noises reaching out to you" – 7:15
7. "Erreur, errance: interdits de par leurs nouvelles possibilités" ("Wandering Error: Prohibited by Their Opportunities") – 4:33
8. "La vie se doit d'être vécue ou commençons a vivre" ("Life Must Be Lived or Let Us Begin to Live") – 6:41

== Personnel ==
=== Fly Pan Am ===
- Jonathan Parant – guitar, organ, piano, vocals, electronics, tapes
- Felix Morel – drums, vocals, electronics, tapes
- Roger Tellier-Craig – guitar, organ, vocals, electronics, tapes
- J.S. Truchy – bass guitar, vocals, electronics, tapes

=== Other musicians ===
- Tom Bernier – clarinet (on "Rompre l'indifference [...]")
- David Bryant – guitar (on "Sound-support surface [...]" and "La vie se doit [...]")
- Bruce Cawdron – bowed percussion (on "Erreur, errance [...]")
- Jacques Gravel – clarinet (on "Rompre l'indifference [...]")
- Christof Migone – noises (on "La vie se doit [...]")
- Thea Pratt – horn (on "Rompre l'indifference [...]")
- Sam Shalabi – guitar (on "La vie se doit [...]")
- Alexandre St-Onge – digital manipulations (on "Rompre l'indifference [...]")

=== Production ===
- Fly Pan Am – audio mixing
- Harris Newman – audio mastering
- Thierry Amar – record producer, audio mixing
- Efrim Menuck – record producer, audio mixing
