= Sofa (Canadian band) =

- Origin: Montreal, Quebec, Canada
- Genres: Noise rock, post-hardcore, post-rock
- Years active: 1993 – 1997, 2021
- Label: Rhyzome / Constellation
- Past members: Scott Clarkson; Ian Ilavsky; Keith Marchand; Brad Todd
- Website: so-fa.ca

Sofa was a Montreal-based band that was originally active from 1993 to 1997, becoming active again in 2021. The group is best known for being the first group to release material on independent record label Constellation Records; bandmember Ian Ilavsky (later a member of Re: and Thee Silver Mt. Zion Memorial Orchestra & Tra-La-La Band) was a co-founder of the label.

== History ==
Most of Sofa's songs were written and played in a 10' x 10' room and were later presented in live shows, after which they were discarded. The band was made up of four members. They self-released two albums on cassette and with Constellation Records had two more releases (one 7" and one CD). The full-length, Grey, received positive reviews from several Canadian press outlets.

Six months after the release of the full-length Grey, the group disbanded. The song "String of Lights" was included on the Constellation compilation disc Song of the Silent Land; one reviewer noted the song's "delicate emotion reminiscent of the Dirty Three".

== Members ==
- Scott Clarkson - bass
- Ian Ilavsky - guitar, organ, piano
- Keith Marchand - drums
- Brad Todd - voice, tape

== Discography ==
- Test Tone (self-release/Rhyzome Records; 1994)
- Town Unsafe (self-release; 1995)
- Record (self-release; 1995)
- New Era Building (Constellation Records; 1997) - includes two songs from 'Record'
- Grey (Constellation Records; 1997)
- Source Crossfire (Constellation Records; 2021)
