= Sédatifs en fréquences et sillons =

Sédatif en fréquences et sillons

EP by Fly Pan Am
- Released: October 23, 2000
- Recorded: Hotel2Tango during 2000
- Genre: Post-rock; Experimental rock
- Length: 29:35
- Label: Constellation CST011
- Producer: Efrim Menuck; Thierry Amar; Fly Pan Am

Fly Pan Am chronology
Fly Pan Am (1999)	Sédatif en fréquences et sillons (2000)	Ceux qui inventent n'ont jamais vécu (?) (2002)

Professional ratings
Review scores
Source	Rating
Allmusic	2.5/5 stars
Pitchfork Media	(6.3/10)

Sédatif en fréquences et sillons is an EP by the Montreal-based Fly Pan Am. The name of the album roughly translates to "sedative in frequencies and furrows."

The recording features additional work by Norsola Johnson and Aidan Girt, perhaps better known as members of Godspeed You! Black Emperor.

== Track listing ==
1. "De cercle en cercle, ressasser et se perdre dans l'illusion née de la production de distractions et multiplier la statique environnante!" ("From Circle to Circle, to Rehash and Get Lost in the Illusion Born of the Production of Distractions, and Increase the Surrounding Static!") – 14:34
2. "Éfférant/Afférant" ("Unrelated / Related") – 11:02
3. "Micro Sillons" ("LPs") – 3:59

== Personnel ==
=== Fly Pan Am ===
- Jonathan Parant – guitar, tapes
- Felix Morel – drums, tapes
- Roger Tellier-Craig – guitar, tapes
- J.S. Truchy – bass guitar, tapes

=== Other musicians ===
- Norsola Johnson – vocals (on "De cercle en cercle [...]")

=== Production ===
- Aidan Girt – additional recording (on "De cercle en cercle [...]")
- Efrim Menuck – record producer
- Thierry Amar – record producer
- Fly Pan Am – record producer
