= Patrick Watson =

Patrick Watson may refer to:

- Patrick Watson (musician) (born 1979), Canadian musician, who formed a band by his name
- Patrick Watson (producer) (1929–2022), Canadian producer, author, and director
- Patrick Heron Watson (1832–1907), Scottish surgeon and pioneer of anaesthetic development
