= Lullabye Arkestra =

Canadian musical duo

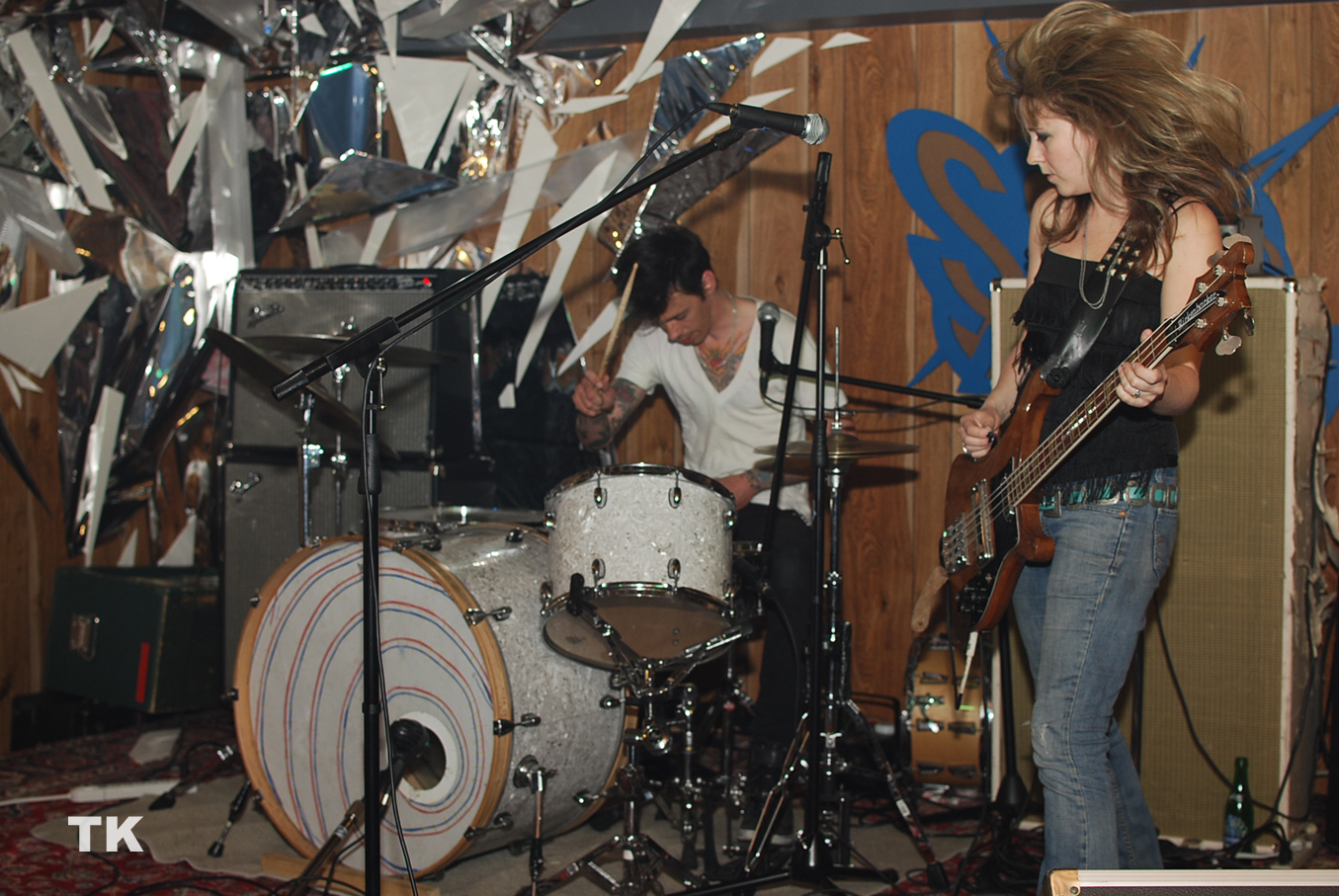
Lullabye Arkestra (2010) left: Justin Small, right: Katia Taylor

Lullabye Arkestra is a Canadian musical duo from Toronto.

Lullabye Arkestra was founded in 2001 by Justin Small, a member of the group Do Make Say Think, and Katia Taylor. Their first release was a self-issued demo called Bzaster, issued in 2002; several members of Do Make Say Think played horns on the demo. The group's membership shifted over time; they play both as a duo and with additional touring musicians, sometimes as many as twelve. Reviews of their early shows noted the contrast between the songs sung by Taylor, which were bluesier and more soul-driven, and those by Small, which tended more toward rock music.

In 2006, they released their debut full-length on Constellation Records, entitled Ampgrave. Allmusic described the album as "deep distortion-drenched soul music", and Exclaim! described it as "one shot of metallic aggression, another shot of sexed-up rock'n'roll, and a glass full of fervent soul". In 2009, Taylor and Small married, and sang backing vocals on the album The Chemistry of Common Life by Fucked Up. That same year, they signed with Vice Records and released Threats/Worship, their second full-length. The release of the album was preceded by the single "We Fuck the Night", which featured a music video paying homage to the films of George A. Romero. Pitchfork Media described the album as "pure grindhouse grit - ugly, brutal, yet thrilling as all hell." The group played the Scion Rock Fest in 2010.

== Members ==
- Katia Taylor - bass, vocals
- Justin Small - drums, vocals

== Discography ==
- Bzaster (demo, 2002)
- Ampgrave (Constellation Records, 2006)
- Threats/Worship (Vice Records, 2009)
