= Karl Lemieux =

Canadian film director (born 1980)

- Born: 1980 (age 45–46)
- Occupation: Film director
- Years active: 2007–present
- Known for: Godspeed You! Black Emperor
- Notable work: Shambles

Karl Lemieux is a Canadian film director best known for his collaborations with Montreal-based post rock band Godspeed You! Black Emperor and his 2016 film Shambles.

== Biography ==
Karl Lemieux joined Godspeed You! Black Emperor in 2010 – when the band came back after a seven-year hiatus – providing film projections shown at live concerts. Those projections largely consist of expressionist tapes shot at empty roads in Canada. He has also designed video projections for the 2012–2013 El Camino Tour by The Black Keys.

In 2015, together with his bandmate David Bryant, Lemieux co-directed the experimental documentary short Quiet Zone about people with electromagnetic hypersensitivity living in the United States National Radio Quiet Zone in West Virginia. The film premiered in January 2015 at the International Film Festival Rotterdam where it was a part of the Tiger Awards Competition for Short Films 2015. At the 4th Canadian Screen Awards the film was nominated for Best Short Documentary by the Academy of Canadian Cinema & Television. A year later Lemieux directed Shambles (original French title: Maudite poutine), his feature film debut. The film premiered at the 2016 Venice Film Festival before going into theatrical release in Canada in 2017. The film garnered four nominations at the 19th Quebec Cinema Awards in 2017.

In 2019, he was one of seven directors, alongside Kaveh Nabatian, Juan Andrés Arango, Sophie Deraspe, Sophie Goyette, Ariane Lorrain and Caroline Monnet, of the anthology film The Seven Last Words (Les sept dernières paroles).

== Filmography ==
=== As director ===
- 2008: Passage (short)
- 2015: Quiet Zone (Ondes et Silence) (documentary short)
- 2016: Shambles (Maudite poutine)
