= Stem Stem in Electro =

Studio album by Hrsta
- Released: May 2, 2005 (Europe); May 16, 2005 (World)
- Recorded: Hotel2Tango
- Genre: Alternative rock, post-rock
- Length: 43:00
- Label: Constellation CST036
- Producer: Howard Bilerman

Hrsta chronology
L'éclat du ciel était insoutenable (2001)	Stem Stem in Electro (2005)	Ghosts Will Come and Kiss Our Eyes (2007)

Stem Stem in Electro is the second album by Canadian band Hrsta. It was recorded in the Hotel2Tango, Montreal, by Howard Bilerman, who co-owns the studio with Efrim Menuck and Thierry Amar of Godspeed You! Black Emperor fame.

== Track listing ==
1. "...and We Climb" – 6:29
2. "Blood on the Sun" – 5:34
3. "Quelque chose à propos des raquetteurs" ["Something in Connection with the Racketeers"] – 3:47
4. "Folkways Orange" – 5:13
5. "Swallow's Tail" – 7:56
6. "Heaven Is Yours" – 4:23
7. "Gently Gently" – 2:58
8. "Une infinité de trous en forme d'homme" ["An Infinity of Holes in the Shape of Man"] – 6:42

== Personnel ==
- Eric Craven – drums, vocals
- Beckie Foon – cello, vocals
- Gen Heistek – viola, vocals
- Mike Moya – guitar, piano, organ, vocals
- Harris Newman – bass guitar
- Sophie Trudeau – violin
