= Aurora (Esmerine album) =

Studio album by Esmerine
- Released: May 31, 2005
- Recorded: 2004 at the Hotel2Tango
- Genre: Post-rock
- Length: 39:55
- Label: Madrona

Esmerine chronology
If Only a Sweet Surrender to the Nights to Come Be True (2003)	Aurora (2005)	La Lechuza (2011)

Professional ratings
Review scores
Source	Rating
Pitchfork Media	(6.2/10)

Aurora is the second album by post-rock band Esmerine. It was released by Madrona Records in 2005.

== Track listing ==
1. "Quelques Mots Pleins d'Ombre" – 7:22
2. "Histories Repeating as One Thousand Hearts Mend" – 16:47
3. "Mados" – 2:34
4. "Why She Swallows Bullets and Stones" – 5:21
5. "Ebb Tide, Spring Tide, Neap Tide, Flood" – 3:48
6. "Le Rire de l'Ange" – 4:21
