= Quiet Zone (film) =

- Ondes et Silence
- Directed by: Karl Lemieux; David Bryant
- Written by: Karl Lemieux; David Bryant
- Produced by: Julie Roy
- Edited by: Charles-André Coderre
- Music by: David Bryant
- Distributed by: National Film Board of Canada
- Release date: 22 January 2015 (IFFR)
- Running time: 15 minutes
- Country: Canada
- Language: English

Quiet Zone is a 2015 Canadian experimental short documentary film directed by Karl Lemieux and David Bryant; they co-wrote the screenplay and Bryant wrote the score. It was produced by the National Film Board of Canada.

The film premiered in January 2015 at the International Film Festival Rotterdam where it was a part of the Tiger Awards Competition for Short Films 2015. At the 4th Canadian Screen Awards the film was nominated for Best Short Documentary by the Academy of Canadian Cinema & Television.

In the documentary, people living in the United States National Radio Quiet Zone in West Virginia talk about their electromagnetic hypersensitivity. Visual and sound effects are used to make their distress palpable to the viewer.
