= Siskiyou (band) =

- Origin: Vancouver, British Columbia, Canada
- Genres: Folk rock, Indie
- Years active: 2010–present
- Label: Constellation Records
- Members: Colin Huebert; Erik Arnesen
- Website: siskiyouband.com

Siskiyou is a Canadian indie folk band formed in Vancouver, consisting of singer-songwriter Colin Huebert and guitarist Erik Arnesen.

== History ==
Siskiyou was formed in 2008 as a duo to record songs that Huebert wrote after leaving the band Great Lake Swimmers to work on an organic farm in British Columbia. Backed up by Shaunn Watt and Peter Carruthers, the band released its self-titled debut album on September 7, 2010.

The band toured both Canada and Europe to support the album, both as a headliner and as an opening act for Jim Bryson and Sandro Perri.

They released their second album titled Keep Away the Dead digitally in September 2011, and on 180g vinyl and CD in October.

The band's third album, Nervous, was released in 2015. The album showcases Huebert's songwriting and vocals, and includes contributions from violinist Owen Pallett. It was a longlisted nominee for the 2015 Polaris Music Prize.

The band's newest album, Not Somewhere, was released in 2019.

== Discography ==
- Siskiyou (2010)
- Keep Away the Dead (2011)
- Nervous (2015)
- Not Somewhere (2019)
