= Elizabeth Anka Vajagic =

Canadian singer and guitarist

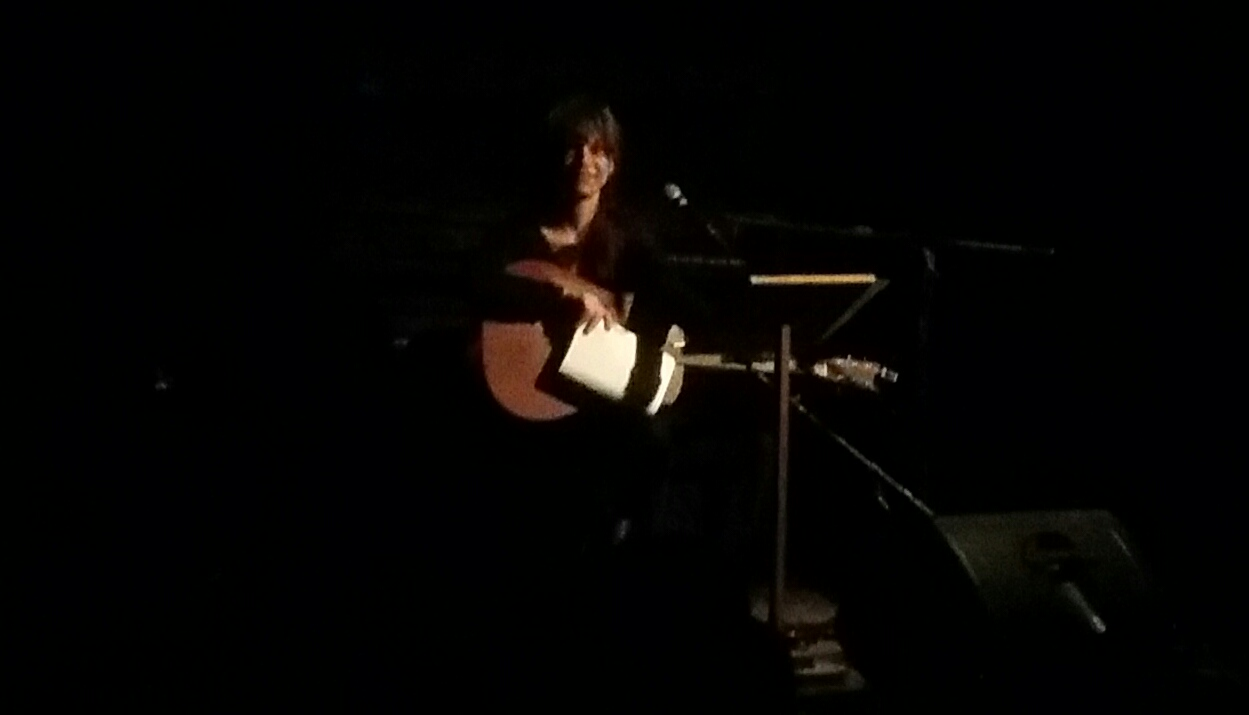
- Elizabeth Anka Vajagic performing at Casa Del Popolo.

Background information
- Origin: Montreal, Quebec, Canada
- Genres: Singer-songwriter, post-rock, emo
- Occupation: Musician
- Instruments: Voice, guitar
- Years active: 2000–present
- Labels: Constellation
- Website: Constellation Artist's Page

Elizabeth Anka Vajagic is a singer and guitarist who was born in Montreal, Quebec, Canada, and is currently signed to noted independent label Constellation Records. She has worked with members of Godspeed You! Black Emperor and Hangedup, and has been praised among independent press publications for her dark, ethereal recordings.

== Discography ==
- Elizabeth Anka (EP) (2000, Editorial Avenue)
- Stand With the Stillness of This Day (2004, Constellation Records)
- Nostalgia / Pain (EP) (2005, Constellation Records)

=== Appears on ===
- Song of the Silent Land (compilation) (2004, Constellation Records)
