= Frankie Sparo =

Canadian musician

Frankie Sparo was the pseudonym of Chad Jones, a singer/songwriter from Victoria, British Columbia was later based in Montreal, Quebec, where he released two albums and an EP on Constellation Records.

== Career ==
Jones played in a band called M Blanket in Victoria. By 2000 he had moved to Montreal. That year, under the stage name Frankie Sparo, he released his first album, My Red Scare, accompanying his slow songs and gruff voice with guitar. He continued to perform in Montreal, and a four-song radio session recorded in Amsterdam, Arena Hostile, was released in 2001.

After two releases as a solo artist, Jones enlisted singer/pianist Nadia Moss and several other musicians for the recording of his second full-length album, Welcome Crummy Mystics. The album was released in 2003, and appeared on the !earshot National Top 50 Community and Campus Radio Chart in March that year. Sparo briefly toured in support of the album as a full band with Nadia Moss, Jessica Moss and Scott Levine Gilmore.

Jones put Sparo on ice in 2004, but returned in March 2007 to play a handful of dates in northern Europe supporting the Handsome Furs, and is listed (along with Nadia and Jessica Moss, and Scott Levine Gilmore) as a performer on Sam Shalabi's disc, Eid.

He currently performs as part of The Witchies with Nadia Moss and Jonah Fortune.

== Discography ==
- My Red Scare CD/LP (Constellation Records, 2000)
- Arena Hostile CDEP (Constellation Records, 2001)
- Welcome Crummy Mystics CD/LP (Constellation Records, 2003)
