= Re: (band) =

Canadian musical duo

- Years active: 1998–present
- Label: Constellation
- Members: Aden Evens; Ian Ilavsky

Re: is a musical project of Aden Evens and Ian Ilavsky (also members of Sackville), who have been working together since 1996.

Evens graduated in philosophy and math from Harvard in 1988 and, after spending some years programming computers in Boston, moved to Montreal, where he met Ilavsky.

Ilavsky dropped out of school in 1992 to "bake bagels and play in post-punk band Sofa." He later joined Sackville (1996) and, together with Don Wilkie, co-founded Constellation Records, in 1997.

The band's first release, Mnant, was issued by Constellation in 2001 after three years of recording sessions. A follow-up full-length, Alms, arrived in 2004, continuing the band's exploration of noise, ambient, and electro-acoustic textures.

== Discography ==
- Mnant LP/CD (Constellation Records; 2001)
- Alms LP/CD (Constellation Records; 2004)
