= Exhaust (band) =

Canadian experimental music group

Exhaust was a Canadian trio from Montreal featuring bass, drums, tape and bass clarinet, active from 1995 to 2012. The members were Aidan Girt (drums), Gordon Krieger (bass/ bass clarinet) and Mike Zabitsky (tape loops).

== History ==
Exhaust's first release was the limited release cassette 230596. Their debut LP Exhaust, (later reissued on CD) was one of the first releases on the then-fledgling Constellation Records label. The album was recorded at partly at Hotel2Tango in Montreal, and partly at Mom and Pop Sounds. The ten tracks consisted of 34 minutes of eclectic experimental rock music played by Girt and Krieger, augmented by Zabitsky's studio effects and audio samples.

A second album, Enregistreur, was released in 2002; a synthesis of low bass riffs, bass clarinet, drumming, speech and machine noise samples, it was described in the Austin Chronicle as a "clattering collage of broken wires and cold urban filth". It was meant to be their final album but, in December 2011, they (independently) released a third album (online only), titled Grenadilla Splinters.

== Discography ==
Albums

- 230596 cassette (self-release; 1996)
- Exhaust LP (Constellation Records; 1998)
- Exhaust CD (Constellation Records; 2000)
- Enregistreur CD/LP (Constellation Records; 2002)
- Grenadilla Splinters (online release only, 2011)

Compilations

- "Metro Mile End" on Music Until Now (Constellation Records; 2002)
- "Ice Storm" on Afterhours No. 18: A Child Will Imitate His Parents (Afterhours magazine, 2003)
- "Wool Fever Dub" on Song of the Silent Land, (Constellation Records, 2004)
