= Sackville (band) =

Canadian band

- Origin: Montreal, Quebec
- Genres: Folk, rock
- Years active: 1994–2001
- Labels: Mag Wheel, Constellation
- Past members: Gabriel Levine; Genevieve Heistek; Eric Craven; Ian Ilavsky; Harris Newman; Pat Conan; Rob Viola
- Website: sackville.org

Sackville was a Canadian musical group based in Montreal that played what has been classified as country and pop, although their style resembles more folk, rock, and avantgarde. They formed in 1994 and recorded their first album in 1996.

Sackville disbanded in 2001, but many members have gone on to play in other bands, including: Wild Lawns and Black Ox Orkestar (Gabriel Levine), Hangedup (Genevieve Heistek and Eric Craven), Re: and Thee Silver Mt. Zion Memorial Orchestra & Tra-La-La Band (Ian Ilavsky), Triple Burner (Harris Newman - also solo), The Carnations (Pat Conan), The Red and the Black, Haywood, Cherubino, and The Trouble with Sweeney (Rob Viola).

== Discography ==
Albums

- These Last Songs (1998)
- Natural Life (2001)

EPs

- Low Ebb E.P. (1996)
- The Principles of Science (1999)

Singles

- "My Beautiful Bride" b/w "Destroy, Destroy" (1999) (7" split w/ The Handsome Family)

== See also ==
- List of bands from Canada
