= Fly Pan Am =

Canadian experimental rock band

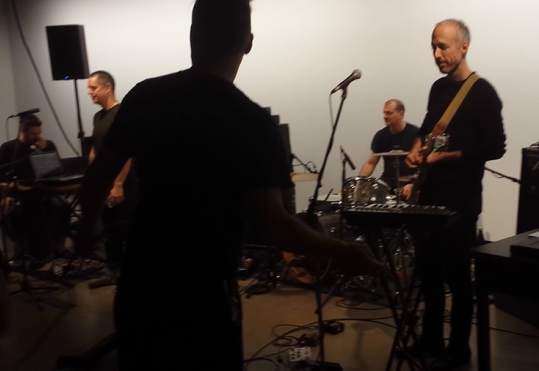
- Fly Pan Am photographed in Montréal, Québec, Canada.

Background information
- Also known as: Le Fly Pan Am
- Origin: Montreal, Quebec, Canada
- Genres: Post-rock, experimental rock
- Years active: 1996–2005; 2018–present
- Labels: Constellation
- Members: Félix Morel; Jonathan Parant; Roger Tellier-Craig; Jean-Sébastien Truchy
- Past members: Éric Gingras
- Website: cstrecords.com/pages/artist/fly-pan-am

Fly Pan Am, or Le Fly Pan Am, are a Canadian experimental rock band formed in Montreal in 1996. They release their albums through the Montreal-based Constellation Records, producing and collaborating on works with Godspeed You! Black Emperor and Shalabi Effect.

== About the band ==
The band was formed in 1996 by guitarists Jonathan Parant and Roger Tellier-Craig, drummer Felix Morel, and bassist Jean-Sebastien Truchy. Eric Gingras would later on join the band in 2002, contributing guitar and percussion. They additionally shared personnel with Godspeed You! Black Emperor, until guitarist Roger Tellier-Craig left Godspeed You! Black Emperor in 2003 to concentrate full-time on Fly Pan Am.

The band is influenced by the French Canadian culture of Quebec, as well as the burgeoning avant-garde musical scene in Montreal. French is the predominant language used in producing albums and writing lyrics, with English peppered throughout. The track titles on past records, as stated by Roger Tellier-Craig, were written in a way to interpret the song, which Tellier-Craig concedes was "lost on most listeners" due to the French used. Unorthodox use of electronic sounds, occasionally provided by Alexandre St-Onge, serve to intersect and often confuse the listener.

The group often recorded their albums at the Hotel2Tango, a recording studio owned by Efrim Menuck and Thierry Amar of Godspeed You! Black Emperor, as well as Howard Bilerman. As a result of these ties, members of other Montreal-based bands sometimes participated as guest musicians or aided the recording process.

An announcement from the band in 2006 spoke of their indefinite hiatus and Parant's part in Feu Thérèse. Tellier-Craig went on to found experimental pop band Pas Chic Chic with Gingras playing bass. Morel currently drums for the psychedelic sludge band, Panopticon Eyelids, and for Les Enfants Sauvages. Gingras has released two albums as Enfant Magique, the first self-released, the second, L'art d'enfiler les pearls, released by independent Montreal label, No Weapon.

In September 2018, the band announced on their Facebook page a re-formation after a 14-year hiatus to play a single live show in Montreal, along with new artwork to advertise as such. The band's hiatus officially concluded with the announcement and release of their fourth studio album, C'est ça, in June and September 2019 respectively.

== Discography ==
=== Albums ===
- Fly Pan Am (Constellation Records; 1999)
- Ceux qui inventent n'ont jamais vécu (?) (Constellation Records; 2002)
- N'écoutez pas (Constellation Records; 2004)
- C’est ça (Constellation Records; 2019)
- Frontera (Constellation Records; 2021)

=== EPs and singles ===
- "aMAZEzine! 7" " single with Godspeed You! Black Emperor, given away free with aMAZEzine! Magazine; (1998). Included "L'espace au sol est redessiné par d'immenses panneaux bleus"
- Sédatifs en fréquences et sillons EP (Constellation Records; 2000)
- "Mirror Cracks Seeking Interiority"; Part of Corona Borealis Longplay Singles series (Constellation Records; 2020)
