= Sandro Perri =

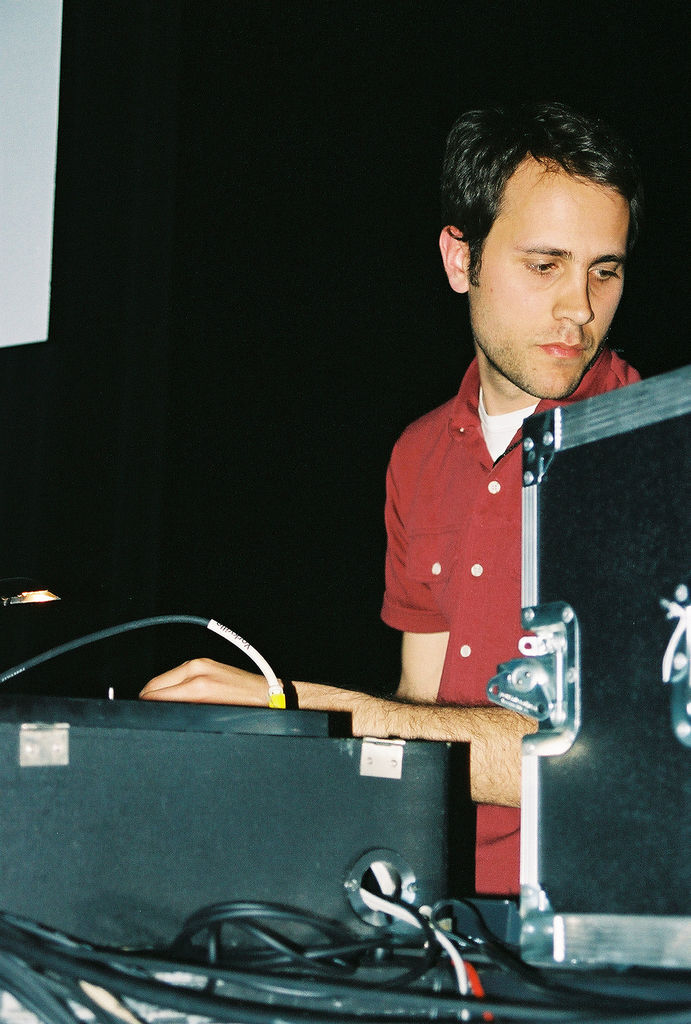
- Perri in 2005

Background information
- Genres: Folk; Pop; Post-Rock; Ambient; Techno; Electronic music
- Occupations: Artist; Producer; Mix Engineer
- Years active: 1999–present
- Labels: Alien8 Recordings; Constellation
- Website: http://www.sandroperri.com/

Sandro Perri is a musician and producer from Toronto, Ontario, Canada. His music has been called post-rock, electronic, experimental, ambient, folk among others. He has been producing, mixing and mastering records for other artists since 2003.

== Career ==
Between 1999 and 2002, Perri self-released a series of 12" records on his own Audi Sensa label. He adopted the moniker Polmo Polpo (loosely translates as "octopus lung" in Italian) for some of his electronic compositions; Polmo Polpo music is characterized by distorted drones, subtle rhythms, and ambient textures. The Science of Breath, featuring tracks culled from these records, was released in 2002 by Alien 8 Recordings; the official Polmo Polpo debut album, entitled Like Hearts Swelling, was released in 2003 on Constellation Records. In 2005, he released Kiss Me Again and Again - a cover of the Arthur Russell / Loose Joints disco classic Kiss Me Again.

In 2004, he began touring under his own name, singing and playing more folk-tinged songs, initially live reworkings of his Polmo Polpo recordings. Four songs were self-released on the Friends Help Friends EP in 2005, re-released a year later (with an additional song) on Constellation as Plays Polmo Polpo. In 2007, his debut full-length as Sandro Perri was released, also by Constellation, entitled Tiny Mirrors. Several musicians contributed to the overall direction of the record, including The silt (Ryan Driver, Doug Tielli, Marcus Quin), Blake Howard and Eric Chenaux. The album was long listed for the Polaris Prize and the song "Double Suicide" was nominated for the SOCAN Echo Songwriting Award. That same year, Polmo Polpo performed at the Brampton Indie Arts Festival.

In 2011, Perri, Christine Fellows and John K. Samson participated in the National Parks Project, working with filmmaker Daniel Cockburn to produce and score a short film about Ontario's Bruce Peninsula National Park.

Also in 2011, Constellation released the critically acclaimed Impossible Spaces, which was recorded by Toronto engineer Jeff McMurrich. Pitchfork named it one of the Top 50 records of 2011, it was long listed for the Polaris Prize, and Now magazine named it one of the Top 50 Toronto Records Of All Time. The album appeared on the !earshot Campus and Community National Top 50 Albums chart in January, 2012.

In 2012, songs from Impossible Spaces were remixed by Zongamin, Mickey Moonlight, Eluvium, Max Gross, Larry Gus, Le Revelateur, Imugem Orihasam, Slow Hands and Tom Croose for 12"s on DFA Records, Constellation and Phonica.

In 2016, he released the collaborative electronic album Off World 1, with a follow-up album simply entitled 2 released in 2017, and a third album entitled 3 in 2023.

In 2018, he released In Another Life, an experiment in "infinite songwriting" which consisted of 2 long tracks. The title track was named one of the Top 100 Songs of 2018 by Pitchfork Media. The flip side, Everybody's Paris, featured guest lead vocal appearances by Dan Bejar (Destroyer) and Andre Ethier (The Deadly Snakes).

A new LP, Soft Landing, was released in September, 2019.

Perri briefly played lap steel guitar with Barzin (in 2001) and Great Lake Swimmers from 2002–2006. He is also a member of The Michael Parks. Collaborative projects include Dot Wiggin with the late Todd Fox, Glissandro 70 with Craig Dunsmuir, Double Suicide with Ryan Driver, Continuous Dick with Adam Marshall and Andrew Wedman, and Off World with Lorenz Peter, Drew Brown, Susumu Mukai, MJ Silver and a host of others.

In 2022, he collaborated with Dan Bejar's musical project Destroyer on a song entitled "Somnambulist Blues".

== Discography ==
=== as Polmo Polpo ===
2001: Acqua/Oarca
2002: Riva/Rottura
2002: The Science of Breath
2003: Like Hearts Swelling
2005: Kiss Me Again and Again

=== as Sandro Perri ===
2006: Plays Polmo Polpo
2007: Sandro Perri and Friends - European Tour 2007
2007: Tiny Mirrors
2011: Impossible Spaces
2012: Love & Light / The Drums (remixes EP)
2012: Changes / Love & Light (remixes EP)
2013: Spaced Out (remixes EP)
2018: In Another Life
2019: Soft Landing

=== as Off World ===
2016: 1
2017: 2
2023: 3

=== Others ===
1999: Cog / Polmo Polpo - split 12"
2000: Dot Wiggin - Dot Wiggin
2002: Tinketertoy / Polmo Polpo - split 12"
2005: Adam Marshall / Continuous Dick - Birth Of A Dick 12"
2006: Glissandro 70 - Glissandro 70
