= Set Fire to Flames =

Canadian instrumental music ensemble

- Origin: Montreal, Quebec, Canada
- Years active: 2001–2003
- Labels: Alien8; FatCat; P-Vine
- Spinoff of: Godspeed You! Black Emperor
- Past members: Beckie Foon; Bruce Cawdron; Christof Migone; David Bryant; Fluffy Erskine; Gen Heistek; Gordon Krieger; Jean-Sébastien Truchy; Mike Moya; Roger Tellier-Craig; Sophie Trudeau; Speedy Weaver; Thea Pratt
- Website: Set Fire to Flames

Set Fire to Flames was a Canadian instrumental music ensemble consisting of 13 musicians from Montreal, Quebec. The band was often considered a side project of Godspeed You! Black Emperor, as the two groups shared several members.

== History ==
Set Fire to Flames was initiated by David Bryant. The group released two albums with Alien8 Recordings and FatCat Records, on their own imprint, 130701, which was set up in 2001. Their first album, Sings Reign Rebuilder, was released in October that year.

The ensemble's second album, Telegraphs in Negative/Mouths Trapped in Static, followed in 2003. It was recorded in a barn in rural Ontario; notably, incidental sounds from the location such as those of creaking doors and other background noises are heard at various points on the album.

Both albums contain brooding, eerie music. Many of the tracks are minimalist, filled with ambient noise and various other non-musical sound effects, juxtaposed or combined with instrumental music. Both album cover images display the work of photographer Michael Ackerman.

A third album was recorded in collaboration with the band Jackie-O Motherfucker but never released. In 2009, a composition from the band's first album was included on a compilation album released by 130701. In 2016, a previously unreleased track recorded in 2005 was released on 130701's 15th-anniversary compilation Eleven Into Fifteen.

On 13 August 2025, Set Fire to Flames' music was removed from streaming platforms, mirroring a decision made by their main project, Godspeed You! Black Emperor, to withdraw music from streaming services, particularly Spotify, whose CEO Daniel Ek has invested in AI military technology, a move contrary to the band's stated beliefs.

== Discography ==
Albums

- Sings Reign Rebuilder (2001)
- Telegraphs in Negative / Mouths Trapped in Static (2003)

Contributions

- Floored Memory….Fading Location (2009) includes "Steal Compass/Drive North/Disappear"
- Eleven into Fifteen: a 130701 Compilation (2016) includes "Barn Levitate"
