= Hangedup =

Hangedup was an experimental rock duo from Montreal, Quebec, Canada, featuring Genevieve Heistek on viola and Eric Craven on drums and percussion. They combined viola with strong percussion, sometimes using self-made instruments, to create intense experimental post-rock music.

== History ==
Heistek and Craven performed with the band Sackville. Heistek was also part of The Mile End Ladies String Auxiliary, Set Fire to Flames, HṚṢṬA, and Land of Kush. Craven was associated with Shortwave, HṚṢṬA, and formerly Thee Silver Mt. Zion Memorial Orchestra & Tra-La-La Band. In 1999, they came together to form Hangedup, and were signed in Montréal by Sackville's label, Constellation Records.

Their first album, self-titled, was recorded at Hotel2Tango studios and released in 2001. In 2002, they released Kicker in Tow. Clatter for Control came out in 2005.

In 2012, Constellation released Musique Fragile 02, a limited-edition boxed set of three vinyl LPs: one each from the bands Kanada 70 and Pacha, and Transit of Venus, a six-track collaborative album by Hangedup and Tony Conrad.

Hangedup performed all over the world. In 2003, it played Barcelona's Primavera Sound Festival. In October 2005, Hangedup joined Patti Smith and Guy Picciotto onstage at Jem Cohen's Fusebox festival in Ghent. In December 2010, the duo appeared at England's All Tomorrow's Parties in Butlin's Minehead.

Also in 2012, Hangedup was featured in And We Made the Room Shine, a film by François Clos and Thomas Lallier about Constellation Records. The film was presented at the 2012 Vienna International Film Festival.

== Discography ==
- Hangedup (2001, Constellation Records)
- Kicker In Tow (2002, Constellation Records)
- Clatter For Control (2005, Constellation Records)
- Transit Of Venus - With Tony Conrad (2012, Constellation Records)
