= Constellation Records (Canada) =

Canadian record label

- Founded: 1997
- Founder: Ian Ilavsky and Don Wilkie
- Genre: Experimental rock, experimental, indie rock, folk
- Country of origin: Canada
- Location: Montreal, Quebec
- Official website: cstrecords.com

Constellation Records is a Canadian independent record label based in Montreal, Quebec. It has released albums by many post-rock bands, including Godspeed You! Black Emperor, Thee Silver Mt. Zion Memorial Orchestra & Tra-La-La Band and Do Make Say Think.

== Label philosophy ==
The package of the 2002 Godspeed You! Black Emperor album Yanqui U.X.O. was especially noteworthy, containing an extensive chart which demonstrated the links between the then four major record labels—AOL Time-Warner, BMG, Sony, Vivendi Universal—and various arms manufacturers. The band later released a correction: "EMI appears on the chart as a subsidiary of AOL Time-Warner when in fact and as of this writing, it continues to comprise a company separate from the other four majors (albeit one which has embarked on many co-ventures with several of these record companies)."

On 25 February 2010, Constellation Records founders Ian Ilavsky and Don Wilkie signed, together with 500 artists, the call to support the international campaign for Boycott, Divestment and Sanctions against Israeli Apartheid.

In 2020, due to the COVID-19 pandemic, the label announced that the artists on its roster would be receiving 100% of revenue from their webstore and Bandcamp sales. Constellation also announced that it had "set aside an additional contingency fund for label-affiliated artists who might find themselves in particularly precarious or dire straits in the weeks/months to come, and for other precarious workers in our proximate cultural economy and community – independent music venues for example".

== Notable artists ==
- Aidan Girt
- All Hands_Make Light
- Black Ox Orkestar
- Carla Bozulich
- Clues
- Colin Stetson
- Do Make Say Think
- Efrim Menuck
- Elizabeth Anka Vajagic
- Esmerine
- Exhaust
- Fly Pan Am
- Frankie Sparo
- Glissandro 70
- Godspeed You! Black Emperor
- Hangedup
- Hiss Tracts
- Hrsta
- Jerusalem in My Heart
- Jem Cohen
- Jessica Moss
- Last Ex
- Light Conductor
- Lullabye Arkestra
- Matana Roberts
- Ought
- Sandro Perri
- Rebecca Foon
- Re:
- Sackville
- Siskiyou
- Sofa
- The Dead Science
- Thee Silver Mt. Zion Memorial Orchestra
- Tindersticks
- Vic Chesnutt

== See also ==
- List of record labels
- Constellation Records (Canada) discography
