= Graham Van Pelt =

Canadian musician

- Also known as: Miracle Fortress, Inside Touch, GVP
- Origin: Stratford, Ontario, Canada
- Genres: Techno-pop, electronic
- Occupations: music producer, songwriter, vocalist, DJ,
- Instruments: Vocals, drum machine, keyboard, synth
- Years active: 2005–present
- Labels: Arbutus Records, No Bad Days, Rough Trade, Secret City Records, Alien8 Recordings
- Formerly of: Think About Life
- Website: www.grahamvanpelt.com

Graham Van Pelt is a Canadian musician currently based on Salt Spring Island. In 2005, Van Pelt founded the group, Think About Life, with Matt Shane, and Martin Cesar. The trio released two albums via Alien8 Recordings and toured North America, Europe, and Asia between 2005 and 2011. Between 2005 and 2014, Van Pelt released two solo albums, and a series of singles, under the moniker Miracle Fortress, including the debut album, Five Roses, which was shortlisted in 2007 for the Polaris Music Prize. In 2018, Van Pelt released the album Time Travel under his own name, followed by Sense Appeal in 2020 and Salt Spring: Sun and Shadow in 2021.

== Life and career ==
In 2005, Van Pelt founded Think About Life with Matt Shane, and Martin Cesar. The group released two albums via Alien8 Recordings and toured North America, Europe, and Asia between 2005 and 2011. The group reunited for a performance at 16th edition of POP Montreal in 2017.

Between 2005 and 2014, Van Pelt released material under the moniker Miracle Fortress. He released two albums, and a series of singles, under this name via Montreal's Secret City Records. His debut Five Roses was shortlisted for the 2007 edition of the Polaris Music Prize. Miracle Fortress' sophomore album Was I the Wave? marked the beginning of a more electronic direction for Van Pelt.

In 2018, Van Pelt announced that he would be releasing new material under his own name. His debut album Time Travel was released on October 19, 2018, via Arbutus Records. He supported the release with multiple tours across North America and Europe, including dates supporting with Kllo, COMA, and Blue Hawaii, and performances at the Red Bull Festival Montreal, Zemlika Festival, The New Colossus, Savannah Stopover, Focus Wales, Great Escape, and Festival Santa Teresa.

On April 17, 2020, Van Pelt released the Sense Appeal EP via Arbutus Records and No Bad Days. The EP features remixes from Yu Su and Gene Tellem.

Salt Spring: Sun and Shadow, a collection of instrumental tracks recorded by Van Pelt on Salt Spring Island was released on May 28, 2021, via Arbutus Records.

== Discography ==
=== Studio albums ===
- Time Travel (2018, Arbutus Records)
- Salt Spring: Sun and Shadow (2021, Arbutus Records)

=== EPs ===
- Sense Appeal (2020, Arbutus Records / No Bad Days)
