= Think About Love (disambiguation) =

Think About Love is a 1986 compilation album by Dolly Parton.

Think About Love may also refer to:

- "Think About Love" (song), 1985 single by Dolly Parton

== See also ==
- Think About Life, a Canadian musical group
  - Think About Life (album), their self-titled album
- The Thing About Love (disambiguation)
