= Pop Montreal =

Annual music festival in Quebec, Canada

POP Montreal International Music Festival
- Genre: Eclectic
- Dates: Sept. 23–27, 2026
- Locations: Montreal, Quebec, Canada
- Years active: 2002–present
- Founders: Daniel K. Seligman, Noelle Sorbara, Peter Rowan
- Attendance: 50,000+
- Website: popmontreal.com

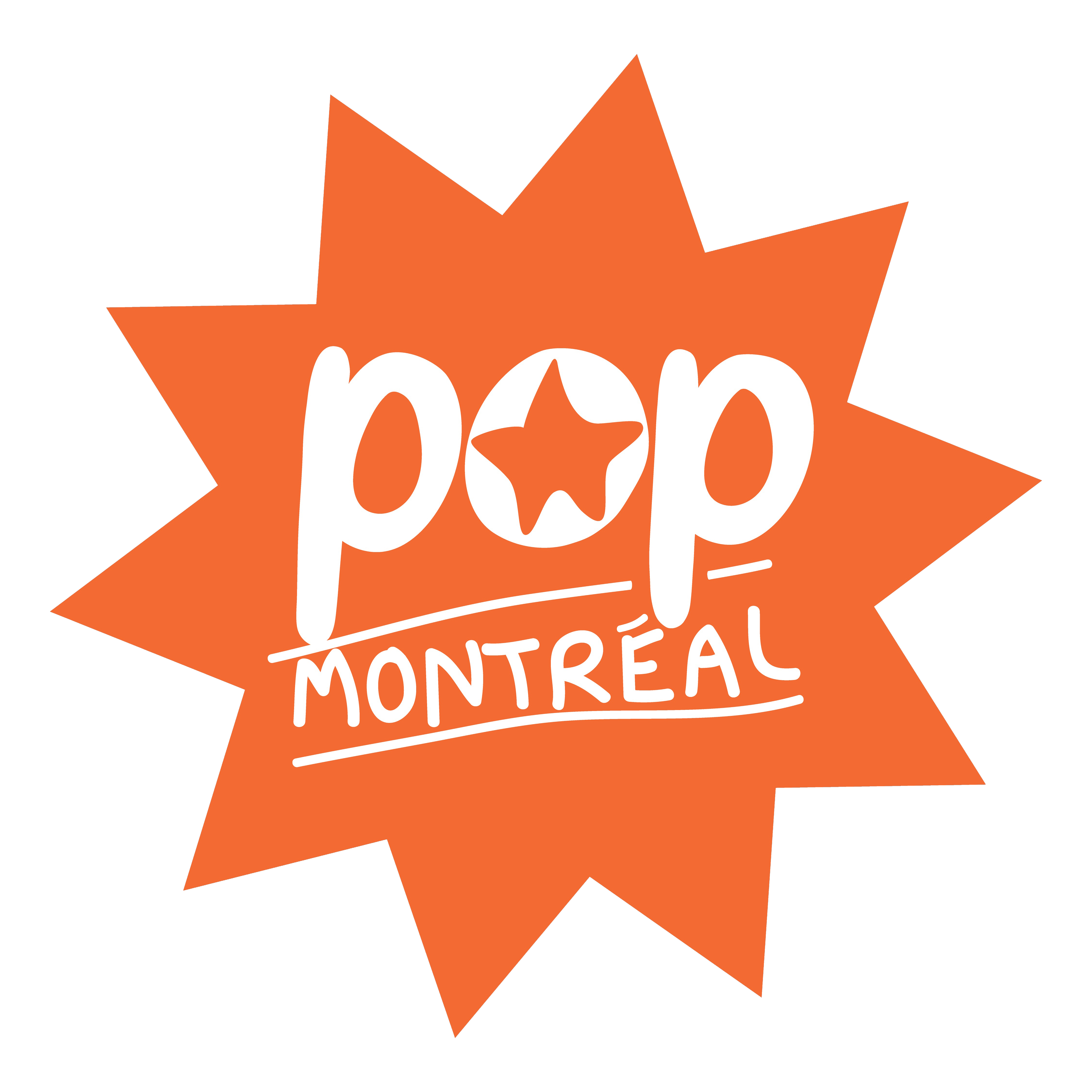

POP Montreal International Music Festival is an annual music festival occurring in Montreal, Quebec, Canada, in the early fall, usually at the end of September or the beginning of October. More than 400 bands are scheduled to play in more than 50 venues across the city, mostly located in the Mile End area. Along with music, POP Montreal has music-related film (Film POP), art events (Art POP) as well as a conference (POP Symposium) and a craft market called Puces POP. The initial festival in 2002 saw 80 musical acts performing in 40 venues around Saint Laurent Boulevard.

The name of the festival was inspired by the Halifax Pop Explosion.

Since its creation by Daniel Seligman, Noelle Sorbara, and Peter Rowan in 2002, POP Montreal has presented concerts of important rock, indie-rock, alternative, hip hop and folk artists from North America and Europe as Beck, Billy Childish, Interpol, TTC or Franz Ferdinand along with local favorites The Dears, Les Breastfeeders, We Are Wolves, Arcade Fire and The Unicorns.

Co-founder Daniel Seligman, whose brother Chris Seligman is the keyboardist of the band Stars, serves as the festival's creative director.

2026 will mark the 25th anniversary of the festival.

== Line-up 2002 ==
The Walkmen, Stars, Blonde Redhead, Arthur H, Interpol, The Dears, Broken Social Scene, Vulgaires Machins, Les Breastfeeders, Amon Tobin, Gros Mené, Julie Doiron, Constantines, Yann Perreau, Hot Hot Heat, Martha Wainwright, Lederhosen Lucil

== Line-up 2003 ==
The Arcade Fire, Buck 65, The Unicorns, Malajube, The Besnard Lakes, Black Dice, Et Sans, Pony Up, Metric, Sloan, Wolf Eyes, Chromeo, The Distillers, Galaxie 500, Queens of the Stone Age, Tiga, Shades of Culture, Milk-Taiwan Milk, Melon Galia.

== Line-up 2004 ==
Franz Ferdinand, Kool Keith, An Albatross, The Black Keys, Tegan and Sara, Frog Eyes, We Are Wolves, Duchess Says, Jorane, Ghislain Poirier, Subtitle, The Weakerthans, Socalled, Magnolia Electric Co., Mission of Burma, Patrick Watson, Torngat, Billy Talent, Death From Above 1979, Lil' Andy, Constantines, Flogging Molly, The Hold Steady, Apostle of Hustle, Holy Fuck, Les Georges Leningrad, Karkwa.

== Line-up 2005 ==
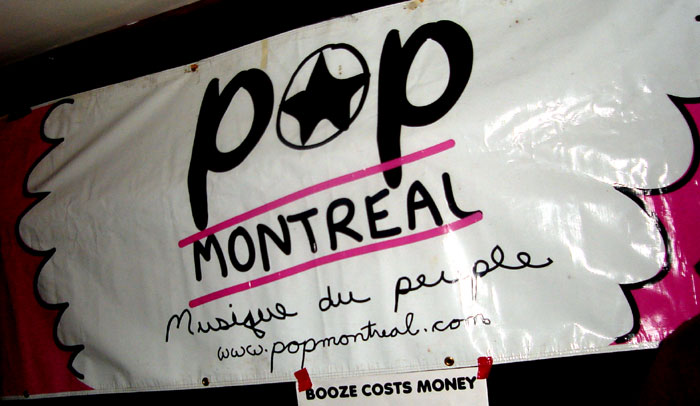
Pop Montreal 2005

Beck, Wolf Parade, Gonzales, Antony and the Johnsons, Billy Childish, Champion, TTC, Islands, Woodhands, Land of Talk, The Dirtbombs, Joseph Arthur, Wintersleep, The Most Serene Republic, Plants and Animals, CPC Gangbangs, Cadence Weapon, Navet Confit, Black Mountain, Deerhunter, Think About Life, The Lovely Feathers, Zoobombs, Priestess, Asobi Seksu, You Say Party! We Say Die!, Tokyo Police Club, Kings of Leon, Architecture in Helsinki

== Line-up 2006 ==
Roky Erickson, Vashti Bunyan, Joanna Newsom, Gary Wilson, Gonzales, Dr. Octagon, Spank Rock, TTC, Think About Life, Kid Sister, Sloan, Cadence Weapon, The Russian Futurists, Beirut, Akron/Family, Born Ruffians, Patrick Watson, Handsome Furs, Socalled, and more.

== Line-up 2007 ==
Patti Smith, Cody ChesnuTT, Pere Ubu, Half Japanese, Mort Sahl, Ron Sexsmith, Michel Pagliaro, Black Mountain, Oakley Hall, Sunset Rubdown, The National, A-Trak, Kid Sister, Caribou, Born Ruffians, Final Fantasy, Chromeo, Tiga, Bobby Conn, Yelle, DJ /rupture, Tony Rebel Jr Kelly, Starvin Hungry, Bionic, Trigger Effect, Lotusland, Magnolia Electric Co., Chad VanGaalen, The Watson Twins, MSTRKRFT, DJ Mehdi, Jay Reatard, Qui, Megasoid, Glitch Mob, The Cool Kids, Gary Lucas, Earlimart, Ndidi Onukwulu, Miracle Fortress, Tagaq, Fujiya and Miyagi, Daedalus, Filastine, United Steel Workers of Montreal, The Barmitzvah Brothers, Maga Bo, Georgie James, Tiombe Lockhart, Ted Leo & The Pharmacists, Library Science, Yip Yip, Basia Bulat, The Bicycles and We're Marching On.

== Line-up 2008 ==
Burt Bacharach, Ratatat, The KnuX, Nick Cave and The Bad Seeds, Hot Chip, Beach House, Baby Dee, Vivian Girls, Silver Apples, Dan Deacon, Brazilian Girls, Black Kids, Jason Collett, Sebastien Grainger, T. Raumschmiere, Vetiver, Akron/Family, Dr. Dog, Congorock, Irma Thomas, The Virgins, The Dodos, Aleks and the Drummer, The Dears, The Bug, Liam Finn, Megasoid, Socalled, Watain, Julie Doiron, The Luyas, These Are Powers, The Lovely Sparrows, Japanther, Dirty on Purpose, The Death Set, AIDS Wolf, Dark Meat, Sister Nancy, Hypnotic Brass Ensemble, Zombie Zombie, Jean-Jacques Perrey, Dana Countryman, Socalled's Porn Pop, Herman Düne, Chad VanGaalen, The Persuasions, WIRE, The Sainte Catherines, Thomas Function, Dominique Grange & Jacques Tardi, Great Lake Swimmers, Katie Moore, Woodhands, Sam Shalabi, Gatineau, Chocolat, Irma Thomas, The Wedding Present, Evangelicals, Jana Hunter, Cex, Teeth Mountain, Teki Latex, The D'Urbervilles, Michie Mee, Two Hours Traffic, Meta Gruau, Patricia Chica & Rockabilly 514.

== Line-up 2009 ==
Fever Ray, Butthole Surfers, Dinosaur Jr., Lou Barlow + The Missingmen, Diamanda Galas, Os Mutantes, Roxanne Shanté, Buffy Sainte-Marie, Dalai Lama, Mono, DJ/Rupture, Tobacco, Lemonade, Ghislain Poirier, Chairlift, Matt & Kim, Iris DeMent, Loudon Wainwright III, Wovenhand, Destroyer, Teenage Jesus & the Jerks, Thee Oh Sees, The Intelligence, The Homosexuals, Bajofondo, Tune-Yards, Zombie Disco Squad, Mike Simonetti, TJ Kong and the Atomic Bomb, Think About Life, Parlovr, Balacade, and many more.

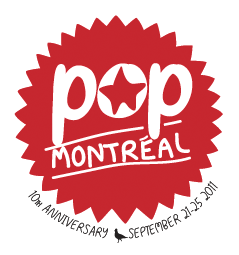

== Line-up 2010 ==
Karkwa, the xx, Grimes, Radio Radio, Van Dyke Parks, Mary Margaret O'Hara, Atari Teenage Riot, Asexuals, Babe Rainbow, BRAIDS, Marnie Stern, Liars, Macy Gray, Carole Pope, The Dears, Big Freedia, Blue Hawaii, Bonjay, Danielson, Deerhoof, Les Savy Fav, Diamond Rings, Mahala Rai Banda, Film School, Gobble Gobble, Holy Fuck, We are Wolves, Immolation, Khaira Arby, Leif Vollebekk, Immolation, Mt Kimbie, Naomie Shelton, Swans, The Budos Band, Timber Timber, Uncle Bad Touch, Xiu Xiu.

== Line-up 2011 ==
Arcade Fire, Khurey-oo, Duzheknew, Jennifer Castle, Touchy Mob, Jef Barbara, B L A C K I E, Hannis Brown, Mozart's Sister, Capitaine Soldat, Purity Ring, The Redmond Barrys, Laura Marling, Girls, Chromeo, Death Grips, The Velvelettes, Jow Bataan, Arbutus Records Showcase with Grimes, Tune-Yards, Les Sexareenos, Azealia Banks.

== Line-up 2012 ==
Grizzly Bear, David Byrne & Saint Vincent, Chilly Gonzales, Gotye, Peaches, DJ Extravaganza, Mozarts Sister, Majical Cloudz.

== Line-up 2013 ==
The-Dream, Local Natives, Colin Stetson, Portugal. The Man, Clap Your Hands Say Yeah, The Dodos, Fred Wesley, Bernie Worrell, Dorothy Moore, Yellowman vs Josey Wales, Pierre Perpall, Patrick Watson, Majical Cloudz, Alaclair Ensemble, Miracle Fortress, Leif Vollebekk, Mozart's Sister, AroarA, Cousins, Yamantaka // Sonic Titan, Angel Olsen, Jenny Hval, Chali 2na, Matias Aguayo, DIANA, Mashrou' Leila, SSION.

== Line-up 2014 ==
Sheryl Crow, J. J. Fad, Panda Bear, Sun Kil Moon, Ronnie Spector, Suzanne Vega, Timber Timbre, DJ Food, Cheeba & Moneyshot, Twin Shadow, Trust, Donnie & Joe Emerson, Dot Wiggin Band, Mutual Benefit, Deafheaven, Bomba Estéreo, Calypso Rose + Kobo Town, Ty Segall, Why?, Les CB's, Hailu Mergia & Low Mentality, Les Deuxluxes, Hiss Golden Messenger, Lydia Ainsworth, PS I Love You, Shonen Knife, Gazoline featuring Simon des Lutins, Dessa, TOPS, The Rural Alberta Advantage, Solids, Zébulon, The Wooden Sky, Wakey! Wakey!, Alden Penner, Blues Control, Katie Moore, Mozart's Sister, Pharis and Jason Romero, Diane Cluck, Ought, WAND, Kid Congo Powers & The Pink Monkey Birds, Grey Lands, Philémon Cimon, La Luz, Buddy McNeil & The Magic Mirrors, Def3.

== Line-up 2015 ==
Giorgio Moroder, Godflesh, Babes in Toyland, Built to Spill, Will Butler, Barbara Lynn, Ought, Mikal Cronin, Thurston Moore, Viet Cong, Braids, Coeur de Pirate and Tim Hecker.

== Line-up 2016 ==
John Cale, The Kills, Wally Badarou, Psychic TV, Angel Olsen, Babyfather, 69 Boyz, DRAM, Kroy, Allah-Las, Diet Cig, Holy Fuck and Devon Welsh.

== Line-up 2017 ==
Kali Uchis, Ty Segall, RZA, Royal Trux, Austra, John Maus, Weyes Blood, Swet Shop Boys, Yves Tumor, Hurray For The Riff Raff, Mount Eerie, Thee Oh Sees, the Besnard Lakes, Jessy Lanza, Deee-lite's Lady Miss Kier and William Basinski.

== Line-up 2018 ==
Wanda Jackson, Bill Callahan, SOPHIE, Venetian Snares, Wolf Parade, U.S. Girls, King Khan and the Shrines, Molly Nilsson, Zola Jesus, Homeshake, Kilo Kish, Leif Vollebekk, Caveboy (band), Nap Eyes, No Joy, Dounia (singer), Palm, The Weather Station, Devon Welsh.

== Line-up 2019 ==
Nick Cave, Laurie Anderson, Mavis Staples, Weyes Blood, Tirzah, Kokoko!, Tinariwen, Aldous Harding, Safia Nolin, Basia Bulat, Shonen Knife, and Hollerado.

== Line-up 2020 ==
Lido Pimienta, Backxwash, Flore Laurentienne.

== Line-up 2021 ==
Backxwash, SUUNS, The Dears, Cadence Weapon, The Besnard Lakes, Cakes da Killa, Plants & Animals, Marie-Pierre Arthur, Safia Nolin, Laura Niquay, Vanille, Comment Debord, El Coyote, Thanya Iyer, Jonathan Personne, Clerel, Paradis Artificiel, Yves Jarvis, No Joy.

== Line-up 2022 ==
Allison Russell, Martha Wainwright, Tortoise, The Linda Lindas, Priyanka, Cymande, DJ Shub, Born Ruffians, Tess Roby and Ouri.

== Line-up 2023 ==
Bonnie "Prince" Billy, Tangerine Dream, Candi Staton, Shabazz Palaces, Men I Trust, Charlotte Adigéry & Bolis Pupul, Do Make Say Think, and Junglepussy.

== Line-up 2024 ==
Stars and The Dears, Sunset Rubdown, Iris DeMent, Mannie Fresh, Beverly Glenn-Copeland, Skratch Bastid, Luna Li, Los Bitchos, Calexico, HOMESHAKE, Silvana Estrada, The Barr Brothers, Egyptian Lover, Erika Angell, Marnie Stern, Ouri, Basia Bulat, The Spirit of the Beehive, Alix Fernz, Unessential Oils, Fernie, YHWH Nailgun, Claire Rousay, Still House Plants, Distraction4ever, Nabihah Iqbal, Virginie B, plus a Lhasa de Sela tribute featuring Feist and Klô Pelgag.

== Line-up 2025 ==
U.S. Girls, Bolis Pupul, Chanel Beads, Ducks Ltd., Annie-Claude Deschênes, and Isabella Lovestory.
