= Mi La Le Mémoire Est Chasse La Mille Voix Têtes De Tête Dans De Sa Ris Neige: Le Monstre Absent =

EP by Et Sans
- Released: 2004
- Genre: Avant-garde
- Length: 20:05
- Label: Squint Fucker Press SQUINTOOG

Et Sans chronology
l'Autre (2001)	Mi La Le Mémoire Est Chasse La Mille Voix Têtes De Tête Dans De Sa Ris Neige: Le Monstre Absent (2004)	Par Noussss Touss Les Trous de Vos Crânes! (2005)

Mi La Le Mémoire Est Chasse La Mille Voix Têtes De Tête Dans De Sa Ris Neige: Le Monstre Absent is an EP by Et Sans. It was released in 2004 by Squint Fucker Press.

The album is recorded onto a Mini CD, which came in a plastic bag that was taped together. Like their debut album, this EP is one song that is 20 minutes and 5 seconds long. The track takes its name from the EP title.

== Track listing ==
1. "Mi La Le Mémoire Est Chasse La Mille Voix Têtes De Tête Dans De Sa Ris Neige: Le Monstre Absent" – 20:05

== Personnel ==
=== Et Sans ===
- Roger Tellier-Craig
- Alexandre St-Onge
