= L'Autre =

L'Autre may refer to:

- l'Autre (Et Sans album), 2001
- "L'autre" (song), B-side of "La Poupée qui fait non"
- L'autre..., a 1991 album by Mylène Farmer
- L'autre (video), VHS recorded by the French singer Mylène Farmer
- L'Autre (2008 film), film by Patrick-Mario Bernard with Dominique Blanc
- L’Autre (2020 film), French drama film directed by Charlotte Dauphin
- The Other (1999 film), a 1999 French-Egyptian drama film
- L'Autre, a 2006 trilogy written by the French writer Pierre Bottero
