= Watery Grave (EP) =

EP by Miracle Fortress
- Released: Winter, 2005
- Recorded: Friendship Cove, Montreal, Quebec
- Genre: Indie rock
- Length: 15:31
- Label: self-released
- Producer: Graham Van Pelt

Miracle Fortress chronology
Watery Grave (2005)	Five Roses (2007)

The Watery Grave EP was Graham Van Pelt's first release under his solo project Miracle Fortress. The self-released five-song EP was recorded in 2005 at Friendship Cove, a recording studio/indie rock venue owned by Van Pelt and fellow friend Jack Dylan. The success of Watery Grave gained Van Pelt the attention of record label Secret City of Montreal, Quebec, Canada. This led to a collaboration that yielded his first full-length album Five Roses.

Copies of the Watery Grave EP are currently out of print, and can only be purchased at shows and through their official MySpace page.

== Track listing ==
1. "Watery Grave" - 2:22
2. "Forgiven" - 2:20
3. "Secret Passage Way" - 4:12
4. "Eschatology" - 3:05
5. "Sacred Flowers" - 3:32

=== Personnel ===
- All songs were written and performed by Graham Van Pelt.
- When songs are performed live, they either involve:
  - Graham Van Pelt playing solo, implementing the heavy use of looping and pre-recorded sounds, while simultaneously playing guitar and drums.
  - Graham Van Pelt's live band, which includes added band members: drummer Jordan Robson-Cramer (Sunset Rubdown and Magic Weapon), guitarist Jessie Stein (SS Cardiacs and The Luyas), and keyboardist Adam Waito (Telefauna).
