= Gnarl =

Gnarl may refer to:

- A rough, knotty protuberance, especially on a tree:
  - Gall, any abnormal outgrowth of plant tissues,
  - Burl, hard rounded outgrowth on a tree trunk.
- GNARL or Gnu Ada Runtime Library, a library for the Ada programming language
- Gnarl (Alien Racers), a character in the 2005 animated program Alien Racers
- Gnarl, a character in the 2007 video game Overlord
- Gnarl!, a 2000 short story collection by Rudy Rucker

== See also ==
- Knurl (band), a noise music project of Alan Bloor
