= A Dime a Dozen =

A Dime a Dozen or Dime a Dozen may refer to:

== Music ==
- "Dime a Dozen", a song by electronic rock act Books on Tape on their album Throw Down Your Laptops
- "Dime a Dozen", a song by American country singer Shirley Collie Nelson
- "A Dime a Dozen", a song by Personalities featuring Landon Tewers of The Plot in You
- "Dime a Dozen", a song by Playaz Tryna Strive (featuring E-40) on their album All Frames of the Game
- "A Dime a Dozen", a song by American pop singer Diane Renay
- "Dime a Dozen", a song in Snoopy! The Musical
- "A Dime a Dozen", a song by American soul singer Carla Thomas
- "Dime a Dozen", a song by American singer Margaret Whiting and the Frank De Vol orchestra

== Television and radio ==
- "A Dime a Dozen", an episode in season 1 of the detective series Hawaiian Eye
- A Dime a Dozen, a 1952 episode of the radio anthology Stars over Hollywood starring Jan Sterling

== Other ==
- A Dime a Dozen, a 1998 book by American children's author Nikki Grimes
- Dime a Dozen, a 1962 revue by Julius Monk's troupe
