= Five Roses (album) =

Studio album by Miracle Fortress
- Released: May 22, 2007
- Recorded: Friendship Cove, Montreal, Quebec
- Genre: Indie rock
- Length: 43:31
- Label: Secret City Records
- Producer: Graham Van Pelt

Miracle Fortress chronology
Watery Grave EP (2005)	Five Roses (2007)	Was I the Wave? (2011)

Professional ratings
Review scores
Source	Rating
Pitchfork Media	(6.3/10)
The Guardian	5/5 stars
Allmusic	4/5 stars
Rockfeedback	2/5 stars
Prefix	(8.5/10)
musicOMH.com	4/5 stars

Five Roses is the first album by Miracle Fortress, released on May 22, 2007. On July 10, 2007, the shortlist for the Polaris Music Prize was revealed. Five Roses was announced as a finalist, alongside such other acts as Arcade Fire, Julie Doiron, and Chad VanGaalen. The winner was announced at a gala ceremony on September 24, 2007, with the award going to Patrick Watson.

== Track listing ==
1. "Whirrs" - 2:32
2. "Have You Seen in Your Dreams" - 3:03
3. "Next Train" - 4:18
4. "Maybe Lately" - 3:15
5. "Beach Baby" - 3:35
6. "Hold Your Secrets to Your Heart" - 3:37
7. "Little Trees" - 4:26
8. "Poetaster" 3:57
9. "Five Roses" - 3:22
10. "Blasphemy" - 4:52
11. "Fortune" - 3:05
12. "This Thing about You" - 3:52

=== Personnel ===
- All songs were written and performed by Graham Van Pelt.
- When songs are performed live, they either involve:
  - Graham Van Pelt playing solo, implementing the heavy use of looping and pre-recorded sounds, while simultaneously playing guitar and drums.
  - Graham Van Pelt's live band, which includes added band members: drummer Jordan Robson-Cramer (Sunset Rubdown and Magic Weapon), guitarist Jessie Stein (SS Cardiacs and The Luyas), and keyboardist Adam Waito (Telefauna).
