= Watery Grave =

Watery Grave may refer to:

- Burial at sea
- Watery Grave (novel), a novel by Bruce Alexander
- Watery Grave (EP), an EP by Miracle Fortress
