= Skin Turns to Glass =

Studio album by Nadja
- Released: October 27, 2003
- Genre: Drone metal
- Length: 44:07 (Original edition); 79:56 (Reissue); 79:47 (2018 vinyl reissue)
- Label: NOTHingness Records; The End Records; Re-Issue

Nadja chronology
Touched (2003/2007)	Skin Turns to Glass (2003)	Corrasion (2003/2007)

Professional ratings
Review scores
Source	Rating
AllMusic	3.5/5 stars
Pitchfork Media	(7.0/10)
The Skinny	4/5 stars

Skin Turns to Glass is the second full-length album by drone doom band Nadja. It was released on October 27, 2003, by NOTHingness Records and was limited to 120 copies. The album was made when Nadja was still a solo effort of Aidan Baker's, prior to Leah Buckareff joining in 2005.

The album was re-issued by The End Records on April 1, 2008, with the entire album remastered and extended (with the exception of "Slow Loss"). Also, this edition of the album contains an untitled 28 minute ambient bonus track played after "Slow Loss."

== Critical reception ==
The Quietus wrote: "The attention to detail is never anything less than immaculate. The sensuous drag of ‘Skin Turns To Glass’ features squalls of multi-tracked guitar lines producing birdsong as a veritable Glen Branca of a guitar orchestra provides the snail-slow rumble." Exclaim! called the album "yet another display of densely layered guitars, buried vocals, achingly slow build-ups and barely audible drum machine patterns."

== Track list ==
=== Original edition ===
No.	Title	Length
1.	"Sandskin"	11:40
2.	"Skin Turns to Glass"	12:21
3.	"Slow Loss"	20:06
Total length:		44:07

=== 2008 Reissue ===
No.	Title	Length
1.	"Sandskin"	14:25
2.	"Skin Turns to Glass"	17:58
3.	"Slow Loss"	19:00
4.	Untitled	28:33
Total length:		79:56

=== 2018 vinyl version ===
Side One
No.	Title	Length
1.	"Sandskin"	18:34

Side Two
No.	Title	Length
2.	"Skin Turns to Glass"	20:30

Side Three
No.	Title	Length
3.	"Slow Loss"	20:32

Side Four
No.	Title	Length
4.	"Untitled II"	20:11
Total length:		79:47

== Personnel ==
=== 2008 Re-Issue ===
- Aidan Baker – guitar, vocals, flute, piano, drum programming
- Leah Buckareff – bass, vocals
