= Children of the Sun (video game) =

2024 video game

- Developer: René Rother
- Publisher: Devolver Digital
- Composer: Aidan Baker
- Platform: Windows
- Release: April 9, 2024
- Genres: Action, puzzle
- Mode: Single-player

Children of the Sun is a 2024 action-puzzle video game developed by René Rother and published by Devolver Digital. In each level, the player character are tasked to eliminate all enemies using one sniper rifle bullet, but players can reaim the bullet each time after it strikes its target. The game was released for Windows in April 2024.

== Gameplay ==
Children of the Sun is a third-person action video game in which the player controls a girl who is on a mission to hunt down a mysterious cult and eliminate its leader. At the start of each level, players choose a vantage point to survey the environment and mark the location of enemies. Once a bullet is fired, the game’s camera follows its path until it hits its target. Players must complete each level by eliminating all enemies using a single bullet, slowing it down and redirecting its trajectory after striking an opponent. As a result, the game functions like a puzzle game, requiring players to strategically map out the bullet’s flight path from start to finish. As players progress, they unlock new skills, such as the ability to slightly alter the bullet’s trajectory mid-flight. The bullet can also trigger environmental hazards, and each level includes a hidden challenge for players to complete. The game tracks players’ progress, recording their performance and enabling them to compare results with others via an online leaderboard.

== Development ==
Children of the Sun was developed by solo developer René Rother in Germany, and development of the game lasted for four years. While Rother was studying graphic design in university, he created prototypes video games for personal interest and participated in game jams such as Ludum Dare in his spare time. Most of his early efforts were "atmospheric kind of pieces" and "walking simulators", though he was unsure if they can be commercialized and sold as a product. Children of the Sun was one of the prototypes he had worked on, and he contacted Devolver Digital which agreed to publish the game after being impressed by its aesthetics despite not liking Rother's initial pitch. Gameplay wise, Rother once experimented with including free-form exploration and stealth for the player character, though these mechanics were scrapped as he wanted to focus on refining and polishing the game's central gameplay mechanic. Killer7 and Hitman were cited as his sources of inspiration, with Rother describing them as games that "require patience and experimentation". Visually, the game were reiterated many times. Aidan Baker of Nadja served as the game's composer.

Devolver Digital announced in the game in February 2024. It was released for Windows on April 9, 2024.

== Reception ==
Reception

Aggregate scores
Aggregator	Score
Metacritic	81/100
OpenCritic	87% recommend

Review scores
Publication	Score
Game Informer	9/10
GameSpot	8/10
VG247	5/5

The game received "generally favorable" reviews according to review aggregator Metacritic. Fellow review aggregator OpenCritic assessed that the game received strong approval, being recommended by 87% of critics.

Diego Nicolás Argüello from Game Informer wrote that "Children of the Sun is a prime example of an experience born from a straightforward premise and then iterated for the right amount of time before it loses its charm". He felt that the core gameplay loop was engaging and satisfying, and he felt that the game's visuals and soundtracks "make for a haunting sensorial stimulation". Toussaint Egen from Polygon praised the game for its replayability and for encouraging players to experiment with their approach, singling out Level 18 "Open Mic Night in Hell" as one of the game's highlights. Kelsey Raynor from VG247 compared the game to Hotline Miami and added that it was a "phenomenal achievement" for Rother to create a puzzle game that is "violent and solemn" at the same time. Writing for GameSpot, Richard Wakeling compared the game to Sniper Elite and Superhot, described the game as a "thinking man's shooter", lauding its core gameplay mechanic for being "innovative". However, he noted that the game was short as he completed the game in around 3 hours.
