= Books on Tape =

Books on Tape or Books on tape could refer to:

- Books on Tape (company), an audiobook publishing company founded in 1975
- Books on Tape (artist), a one-man electronic and rock act from Los Angeles, California
- Audiobooks, spoken-word recordings
