= When I See the Sun Always Shines on T.V. =

When I See the Sun Always Shines on TV

Studio album by Nadja
- Released: April 28, 2009
- Genre: Metalgaze
- Length: 57:54
- Label: The End Records

Nadja chronology
The Bungled & the Botched (2008)	When I See the Sun Always Shines on TV (2009)	Belles Bếtes (2009)

Professional ratings
Review scores
Source	Rating
Pitchfork	8.0/10

When I See the Sun Always Shines on TV is an album of cover songs by drone doom band Nadja, released in April 2009. It was released under The End Records.

== Track listing ==
No.	Title	Writer(s)	Original artist	Length
1.	"Only Shallow"	Kevin Shields	My Bloody Valentine	6:35
2.	"Pea"	Codeine	Codeine	4:09
3.	"No Cure for the Lonely"	Michael Gira	Swans	6:56
4.	"Dead Skin Mask"	Jeff Hanneman; Tom Araya	Slayer	10:06
5.	"The Sun Always Shines on T.V."	Pål Waaktaar	A-ha	6:01
6.	"Needle in the Hay"	Elliott Smith	Elliott Smith	4:45
7.	"Long Dark Twenties"	Paul Bellini	The Kids In The Hall	6:35
8.	"Faith"	Robert Smith; Lol Tolhurst; Simon Gallup	The Cure	12:47

== Personnel ==
- Aidan Baker - guitar, drums, vocals,
- Leah Buckareff - bass, vocals
