= Corrasion (album) =

Studio album by Nadja
- Released: November 15, 2003
- Genres: Drone metal, experimental metal
- Length: 51:55 (Original edition); 79:48 (with bonus tracks)
- Label: Foreshadow Productions
- Producer: Aidan Baker

Nadja chronology
Skin Turns to Glass (2003)	Corrasion (2003)	I Have Tasted the Fire Inside Your Mouth (2004)

Corrasion is the third studio album released by the Canadian drone doom band Nadja. Originally released in 2003 and limited to 200 copies, the album was rerecorded and re-released with three bonus tracks on August 13, 2007.

== Track listing ==
No.	Title	Length
1.	"Base Fluid"	11:45
2.	"You Are as Dust"	10:35
3.	"Corrasion"	8:35
4.	"Amniotic"	21:00
Total length:		51:55

=== Bonus tracks ===
No.	Title	Length
5.	"I Am as Earth"	10:39
6.	"Ash"	7:23
7.	"White Lies"	9:51
Total length:		79:48

== Line-up ==
- Aidan Baker - guitars, vocals, drum machines, production
- Leah Buckareff - bass guitars

== Additional notes ==
- Track five on the rerelease, I Am as Earth, originally appeared on a split that Nadja did with Moss.
- Tracks six and seven on the rerelease on Nadja compilation albums.
