= Thaumogenesis =

Studio album by Nadja
- Released: January 2007
- Genre: Drone metal
- Length: 61:43
- Label: aRCHIVE Recordings

Nadja chronology
Truth Becomes Death (2005)	Thaumogenesis (2007)	Radiance of Shadows (2007)

Thaumogenesis is the seventh full-length album by drone doom band Nadja, it was released in January 2007 by aRCHIVE recordings. It consists of only one long instrumental track lasting over 60 minutes, and the album was limited to 600 copies.

The album was rereleased in March 2008, with slightly different artwork. This issue of the album is limited to 500 copies only.

The title is from the American TV series Buffy the Vampire Slayer, then later in Angel, "The Price". Thaumogenesis means to inadvertently create a being as a byproduct of casting a spell.

== Track list ==
No.	Title	Length
1.	"Thaumogenesis"	61:43
Total length:		61:43

== Personnel ==
- Aidan Baker – guitar, drum machine
- Leah Buckareff – bass
