= Et Sans =

Canadian rock band

- Origin: Montreal, Quebec, Canada
- Genres: Avant-garde; Experimental rock
- Years active: 2000–2006
- Label: Alien8
- Members: Roger Tellier-Craig; Alexandre St-Onge; Felix Morel; Stephen De Oliveira; Sophie Trudeau

Et Sans was a Canadian experimental rock band from Montreal. Their music was characterized by lengthy compositions with lyrics in French, combined with loud, distortion-filled electronic and instrumental sounds with a heavy bass beat .

== History ==
The band was formed by former Godspeed You! Black Emperor guitarist Roger Tellier-Craig and Alexandre St-Onge from the Shalabi Effect. The duo released their first album, l'Autre, in 2001 on the Locust Music label.

After expanding their group to include Felix Morel, Sophie Trudeau, and Stephen De Oliveira, they recorded Par Noussss Touss Les Trous de Vos Crânes!, their second album in 2005. It was their first release on Alien8 Recordings, and combined post-industrial, electronic and hard rock sounds.

== Discography ==
Studio albums

- l'Autre (2001)
- Par Noussss Touss Les Trous de Vos Crânes! (2005)

== See also ==
- List of bands from Canada
- List of Quebec musicians
- Music of Quebec
