= Sur les Traces de Black Eskimo =

Studio album by Les Georges Leningrad
- Released: September 28, 2004
- Genre: Indie rock, experimental rock, post-rock
- Length: 38:58
- Label: Alien8 Recordings

Les Georges Leningrad chronology
| Deux Hot Dogs Moutarde Chou (2002) | Sur les Traces de Black Eskimo (2004) | Supa Doopa Remix (2005) |

Professional ratings
Review scores
| Source | Rating |
|---|---|
| Pitchfork | 7.8/10 |

Sur les Traces de Black Eskimo is the second full–length released by Les Georges Leningrad. It was released on 28 September 2004 by Alien8 Recording.

== Track listing ==
1. "Missing Gary" – 4:28
2. "Sponsorships" – 3:15
3. "Black Eskimo" – 3:06
4. "Nebraska's Valentine" – 3:25
5. "Umiarjuaq" – 2:23
6. "Wunderkind #2" – 2:27
7. "Supa Doopa" – 3:47
8. "St. Mary's Memorial Hall" – 4:59
9. "Pekin Pekin" – 2:40
10. "Richard" – 0:55
11. "Fifi F." – 3:21
12. "Comment te Dire Adieu?" – 3:59
