= The Bungled & the Botched =

Studio album by Nadja
- Released: July 10, 2008
- Genre: Drone metal
- Length: 60:00 (Original edition); 56:40 (CD-R)
- Label: ConSouling Sounds

Nadja chronology
Desire in Uneasiness (2008)	The Bungled & the Botched (2008)	Belles Bêtes (2009)

Professional ratings
Review scores
Source	Rating
Sputnikmusic	4/5 stars

The Bungled & the Botched is the tenth full-length studio album by drone doom band Nadja, released in July 2008 on ConSouling Sounds and limited to 500 copies.

The second track, "Absorbed in You", is a re-recording of the song of the same name from Nadja's collaboration Absorption with Methadrone from 2005. The limited pre-order edition of the album also came with a CD-R containing the demo version of "The Bungled & the Botched" and the original version of "Absorbed in You".

== Track list ==
=== CD ===
No.	Title	Length
1.	"The Bungled & the Botched"	29:56
2.	"Absorbed in You"	30:04
Total length:		60:00

=== CD-R ===
No.	Title	Length
1.	"The Bungled & the Botched" (Demo)	26:00
2.	"Absorbed in You" (Original version)	30:40
Total length:		56:40

== Personnel ==
- Aidan Baker - guitar, vocals, flute, piano, drum machine
- Leah Buckareff - bass, vocals
