= Bliss Torn from Emptiness =

Studio album by Nadja
- Released: June 15, 2005
- Genre: Drone metal
- Length: 48:54 (Original edition); 53:10 (Reissue); 74:58 (vinyl version)
- Label: Fargone Records; Profound Lore Records; Reissue; Dirter Promotions (vinyl version)

Nadja chronology
Bodycage (2005/2006)	Bliss Torn from Emptiness (2005)	Truth Becomes Death (2005)

Professional ratings
Review scores
Source	Rating
Pitchfork Media	(8.0/10)

Bliss Torn from Emptiness is the fifth full-length album by drone doom band Nadja, first released on June 15, 2005 by Fargone Records. This album consists of one 48 minute instrumental track, also this edition of the album was limited to only 60 copies.

The album was later remastered and rereleased by Profound Lore Records, this version of the album was released on January 29, 2008, and has been slightly extended to 53 minutes and split into 3 parts that fade into one another and maintain the intent of the album being one long song. A vinyl reissue was released by Dirter Promotions on September 15, 2014 with a live version of "Memory Leak" as a bonus track.

== Track list ==
=== Original edition ===
No.	Title	Length
1.	"Bliss Torn from Emptiness"	48:54
Total length:		48:54

=== 2008 reissue ===
No.	Title	Length
1.	"Bliss Torn from Emptiness": I. "Pt.1" (17:30); II. "Pt.2 (17:50); III. "Pt.3" (17:50)"	53:10
Total length:		53:10

=== 2014 vinyl reissue ===
Side One
No.	Title	Length
1.	"Bliss Torn from Emptiness, Pt.1"	17:31

Side Two
No.	Title	Length
2.	"Bliss Torn from Emptiness, Pt.2"	19:17

Side Three
No.	Title	Length
3.	"Bliss Torn from Emptiness, Pt.3"	19:10

Side Four
No.	Title	Length
4.	"Memory Leak" (live bonus track)	19:00
Total length:		74:58

== Personnel ==
- Aidan Baker - guitar, drum machine
- Leah Buckareff - bass
