= Supa Doopa Remix =

Supa Doopa

EP by Les Georges Leningrad
- Released: April 12, 2005
- Genre: Post-rock, indie rock, experimental rock
- Label: Troubleman Unlimited

Les Georges Leningrad chronology
Sur les Traces de Black Eskimo (2004)	Supa Doopa (2005)	Sangue Puro (2006)

Supa Doopa Remix is the fourth release by Les Georges Leningrad. It was released April 12, 2005 by Troubleman Unlimited.

== Track listing ==
1. "Supa Doopa (Les Georges Leningrad Version Originale) "
2. "Supa Doopa (Akufen Soutien-Georges Remix)"
3. "Supa Doopa (Magas Remix)"
4. "Supa Doopa (Ghislain Poirier Remix)"
5. "Mein Name Ist Eva Brown"
