= Sangue Puro =

Studio album by Les Georges Leningrad
- Released: October 3, 2006
- Genre: Post-rock Indie rock Experimental rock
- Length: 39:40
- Label: Tomlab

Les Georges Leningrad chronology
Supa Doopa Remix (2005)	Sangue Puro (2006)

Professional ratings
Review scores
Source	Rating
Allmusic	4/5 stars
Pitchfork Media	(7.0/10)

Sangue Puro is the third album by the band Les Georges Leningrad. It was released in 2006 on Tomlab. The title Sangue Puro is Italian for Pure Blood.

== Track listing ==
1. "Sangue Puro" - 6:09
2. "Skulls in the Closet" - 2:59
3. "Scissorhands" - 3:21
4. "Ennio Morricone" - 3:20
5. "Eli, Eli, Lamma Sabacthani" - 3:47
6. "Mammal Beats" - 2:22
7. "Sleek Answer" - 4:10
8. "Mange Avec Tes Doigts" - 1:55
9. "Lonely Lonely" - 2:24
10. "The Future for Less" - 9:07
