= Touched (Nadja album) =

Studio album by Nadja
- Released: May 2003
- Genres: Drone metal, post-metal
- Length: 43:42 (Original edition); 60:01 (2008 reissue)
- Label: Deserted Factory

Nadja chronology
Touched (2003)	Skin Turns to Glass (2003/2008)

Professional ratings
Review scores
Source	Rating
Metal Storm	8.8/10
Pitchfork	7.9/10

Touched is the debut full-length album by drone doom band Nadja, it was first released in May 2003 by Deserted Factory Records. This album was made when Nadja was still a solo effort of Aidan Baker, prior to when Leah Buckareff joined Nadja in 2005.

The album was re-issued by Alien8 recordings on March 13, 2007, with extended songs (except in the case of 'Stays Demons'), and remastered with an untitled bonus track at the end of "Flowers of Flesh". The digital edition released via Bandcamp, however, considers the untitled track as part of 'Flowers of Flesh'.

In 2025, Graham Hartmann of Metal Injection included the album in his list of "10 Extremely Underrated Metal Albums From The 2000s".

== Track listing ==
=== Original edition ===
No.	Title	Length
1.	"Mutagen"	12:00
2.	"Stays Demons"	10:22
3.	"Incubation/Metamorphosis"	12:15
4.	"Flowers of Flesh"	9:05
Total length:		43:42

=== 2007 reissue ===
No.	Title	Length
1.	"Mutagen"	14:22
2.	"Stays Demons"	9:57
3.	"Incubation/Metamorphosis"	18:13
4.	"Flowers of Flesh"	13:13
5.	Untitled	4:16
Total length:		60:01

== Personnel ==
=== Original edition ===
- Aidan Baker – guitar, bass, vocals, violin, loops

=== 2007 re-issue ===
- Aidan Baker – guitar, vocals, flute, drum machine
- Leah Buckareff – bass, vocals
