= The Trial of St. Orange =

Studio album by Shalabi Effect
- Released: February 2002
- Genre: Experimental rock
- Length: 49:56
- Label: Alien8 Recordings

Shalabi Effect chronology
Shalabi Effect (2000)	The Trial of St. Orange (2002)	Pink Abyss (2004)

Professional ratings
Review scores
Source	Rating
AllMusic	4.5/5 stars
Pitchfork Media	9.4/10

The Trial of St. Orange is the second album by the Montreal-based collective, Shalabi Effect.

== Track listing ==
1. "Sundog Ash" – 4:09
2. "Saint Orange" – 5:28
3. "Mr. Titz (The Revelator)" – 4:13
4. "One Last Glare" – 6:29
5. "Sister Sleep" – 4:04
6. "Uma" – 3:59
7. "A Glow in the Dark" – 21:34
