= Deux Hot Dogs Moutarde Chou =

Studio album by Les Georges Leningrad
- Released: 2002; 2003 (Blow The Fuse Reissue); May 11, 2004(Alien 8 Reissue)
- Genres: Indie rock, experimental rock, post-rock
- Length: 49:22 (Original edition); 48:47 (Blow The Fuse); 49:19 (Alien8)
- Labels: Les Records Coco Cognac; Blow The Fuse; Alien8 Recordings
- Producer: Les Georges Leningrad

Les Georges Leningrad chronology
Deux Hot Dogs Moutarde Chou (2002)	Sur les Traces de Black Eskimo (2004)

Professional ratings
Review scores
Source	Rating
Allmusic	4/5 stars
Pitchfork Media	(7.4/10)

Deux Hot Dogs Moutarde Chou is the first full-length album by the band Les Georges Leningrad. It was originally released in 2002 on the band's own Les Records Coco Cognac label. In 2003, Blow The Fuse Records reissued the album. Upon signing with Alien8 Recordings in 2004, the band re-reissued the album on May 11 to mark time for their then upcoming second album.

== Track listing ==
1. "Caamckne Nechn" - 3:28
2. "Lollipop Lady" - 3:32
3. "Bad Smell" - 3:06
4. "Georges V" - 4:11
5. "La Chienne" - 2:53
6. "Didi Extra" - 3:46
7. "Prince R." - 1:04
8. "Wunderkind" - 2:01
9. "Un Imperméable (Mouillé des Deux Côtés) - 3:01
10. "Cocktail Vampire" - 5:13
11. "Constantinople (The Residents)" - 1:16
12. "My Santropic" - 4:22
13. "We are All" - 11:17
