= Pink Abyss =

Studio album by Shalabi Effect
- Released: January 13, 2004
- Recorded: Sound of One Hand
- Genre: Post-rock
- Length: 48:18
- Label: Alien8 Recordings

Shalabi Effect chronology
The Trial of St. Orange (2002)	Pink Abyss (2004)	Unfortunately (2005)

Pink Abyss is the third album recorded Canadian band by Shalabi Effect. It was released on the Alien 8 label. The music combines experimental and modern rock with overtones of pop.

== Track listing ==
1. "Message from the Pink Abyss" – 2:54
2. "Bright Guilty World" – 4:55
3. "Shivapria" – 2:40
4. "Blue Sunshine" – 3:42
5. "Iron and Blood" – 8:53
6. "I Believe in Love" – 3:37
7. "Imps" – 4:28
8. "Deep Throat" – 3:05
9. "We'll Never Make It Out of Here Alive" – 8:49
10. "Kinder Surprise" – 5:15
