= Shalabi Effect (album) =

Studio album by Shalabi Effect
- Released: June 2000
- Recorded: Sound of One Hand, Montreal
- Genre: Experimental; psychedelic; dark ambient
- Length: 131:17
- Label: Alien8 Recordings

Shalabi Effect chronology
Shalabi Effect (2000)	The Trial of St. Orange (2002)

Professional ratings
Review scores
Source	Rating
AllMusic	3/5 stars
Pitchfork Media	(7.1/10)

Shalabi Effect is the debut album by Shalabi Effect. The album cover is taken from the famous Eagle Nebula Pillars of Creation photo made by NASA's Hubble Space Telescope. The album began with the song "Aural Florida", which was originally going to be on a split release with Godspeed You! Black Emperor; when that release was abandoned, the rest of the album was created.

== Track listing ==
=== Disc one ===
1. "Wyoming" – 11:52
2. "Vicious Triangle" – 9:47
3. "Mending Holes in a Wooden Heart" – 7:02
4. "Aural Florida (Approach)" – 10:00
5. "Aural Florida" – 26:37

=== Disc two ===
1. "Mokoondi" – 12:57
2. "Amber Pets" – 7:55
3. "Boardwalk at Apollo Beach" – 6:10
4. "Apparitions" – 5:43
5. "On the Bowery" – 13:01
6. "Leaving a Horse to Die" – 5:03
7. "Return to Wake Island" – 9:03
8. "ﺍﻠﻮﺮﺪﺓ ﺍﻠﺑﻴﻀﺎﺀ" (Arabic: "White Rose") – 6:04
