= TJ Kong and the Atomic Bomb =

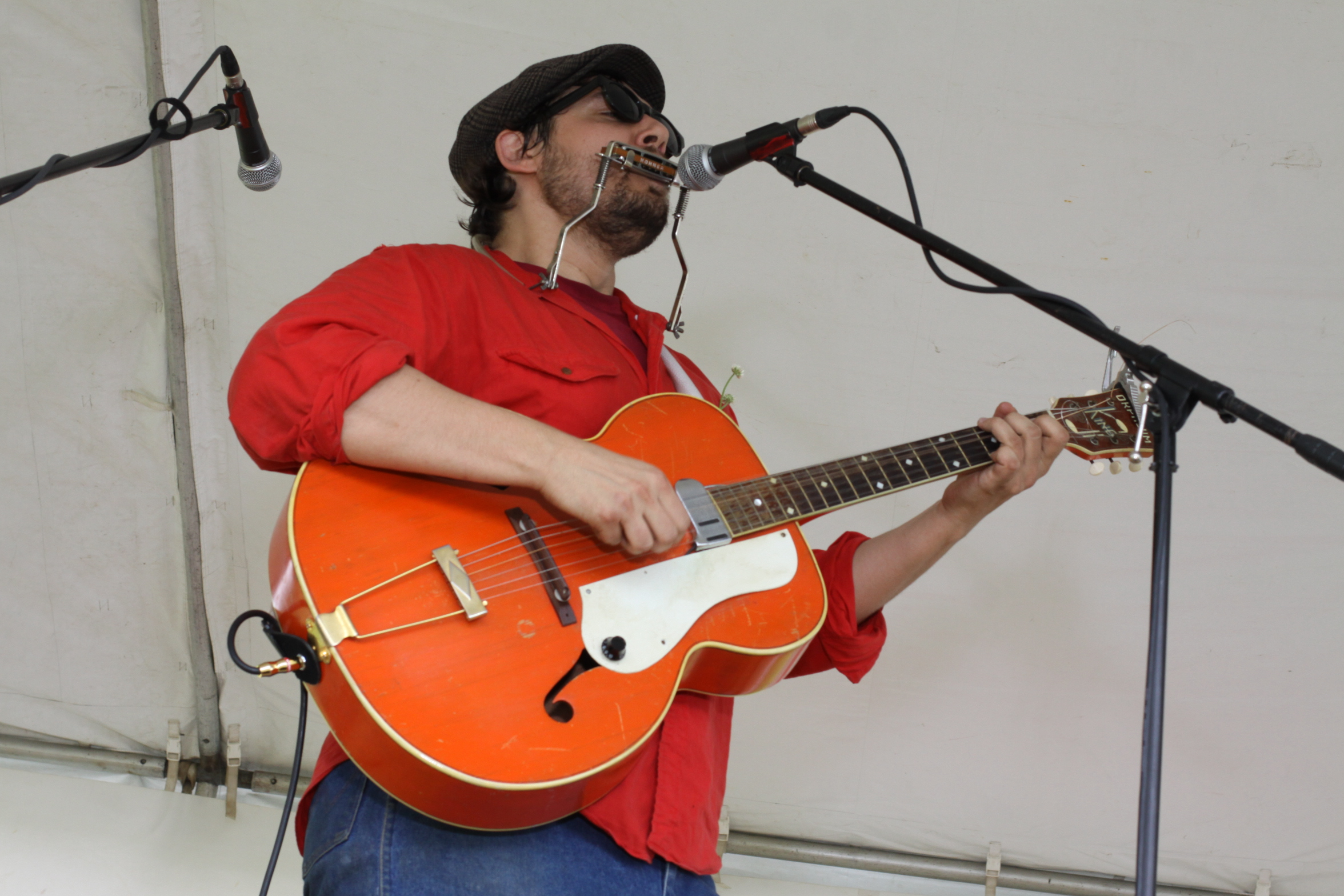
- Lead singer Dan Bruskewicz in 2012

Background information
- Origin: Philadelphia, PA, US
- Genres: folk rock, Americana
- Years active: 2008–present
- Label: Good Behavior
- Members: Dan Bruskewicz; Dan Martino; Joshua Machiz; Josh Olmstead
- Past members: Joshua Willis; Kevin Conner; Johnny Bee
- Website: tjkongandtheatomicbomb.com

TJ Kong and the Atomic Bomb is an American rock band from Philadelphia, Pennsylvania.

== History ==
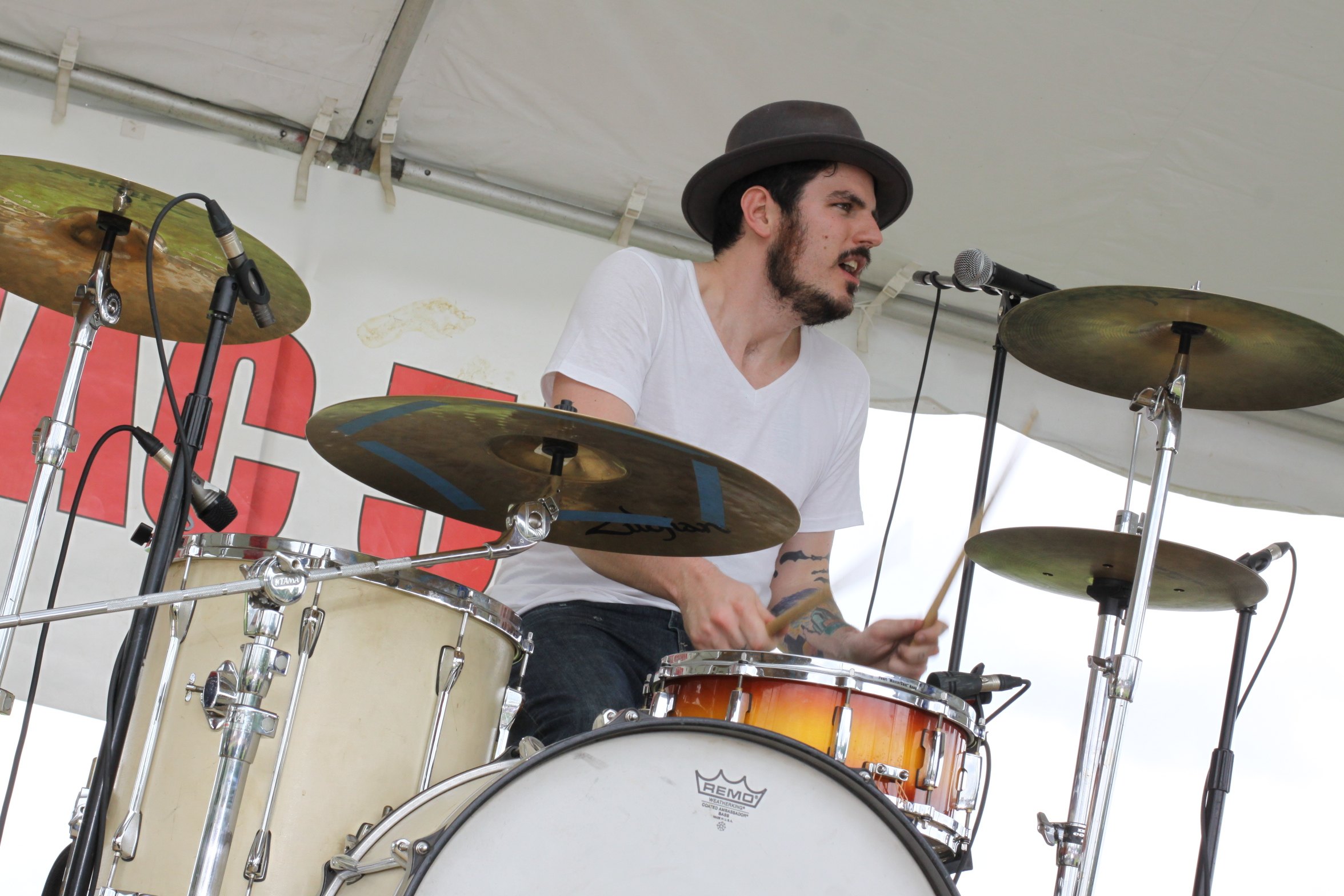
Drummer Dan Martino

TJ Kong and the Atomic Bomb was founded by songwriter Dan Bruskewicz and drummer Dan Martino in March 2008, after the pair began working at the same restaurant in central Philadelphia. At that time, Martino (formerly of punk band Our Time) ran a house show venue in Philadelphia called The Blue Room, which was the group's initial practice and performance space. The band's name references the film Dr. Strangelove, and was initially used by Bruskewicz as a moniker for his solo material prior to meeting Martino. Bruskewicz also performed in the band's early years as a busker in Philadelphia's Suburban Station. They played initially as a duo, but put up ads on Craigslist for additional members; through this site they found Josh Willis, who played bass and banjo with the group from early 2009 to mid-2010. Less than a year after its formation, the band self-released its debut EP, The Hinterlands, and in the fall of 2009 they played the Pop Montreal festival. Kevin Conner was added as a guitarist in early 2010. The band's debut full-length, Idiots, was released in May 2010 by the four-piece.

In late 2010 they added upright bassist Joshua Machiz, who first appeared on the band's 2012 full-length, Manufacturing Joy. The group organized a Tom Waits tribute night in January 2013 at the venue Jose Pistola's. Conner left the group in 2013 and guitarist Josh Olmstead joined later that same year. The KONG EP, recorded in a single day with minimal rehearsal, was issued in March 2014. A music video was created for a song off the KONG EP entitled "Blood in the Bathtub". Following the release of the EP, the group toured the US, including a performance at SXSW. American Diamond Recordings, a label run by Ron Gallo, picked the KONG EP up for digital distribution later that year.

In 2017, the group signed with Good Behavior Records to release a third full-length, which was recorded at Kawari Sound Studios with producer Bill Moriarty. That album, Dancing Out the Door, was released in October 2017. The band framed its first three full-lengths as a trilogy; Bruskewicz noted, "Idiots explores folk music, Manufacturing Joy explores garage, delta blues and country, and Dancing out the Door adds horns as well as organ and keys to explore our strange version of New Orleans, the holiest of the holies." The group filled out its sound for the album with trumpeter Patrick Hughes and pianist Mike Frank, who joined them on subsequent live dates. A tour in support of Dancing Out the Door was launched in October and November 2017, as well as a performance at Paste Studio. A track from Dancing Out the Door, "John Wilkes Booth", was included on a Good Behavior benefit compilation for victims of Hurricanes Harvey and Irma. Salute magazine named Dancing out the Door its #1 "great album you might have missed" of 2017.

Bruskewicz cites Patti Smith, Talking Heads, and Bob Dylan as major influences. The band has hosted an annual Halloween weekend concert series called the "Rock 'n Roll Murdershow" in Philadelphia since 2010. The eighth installment of the series was given in 2017.

In October 2020, Bruskewicz announced a side project, Dan the Movie, as well as the release of a single, "Annalily".

== Members ==
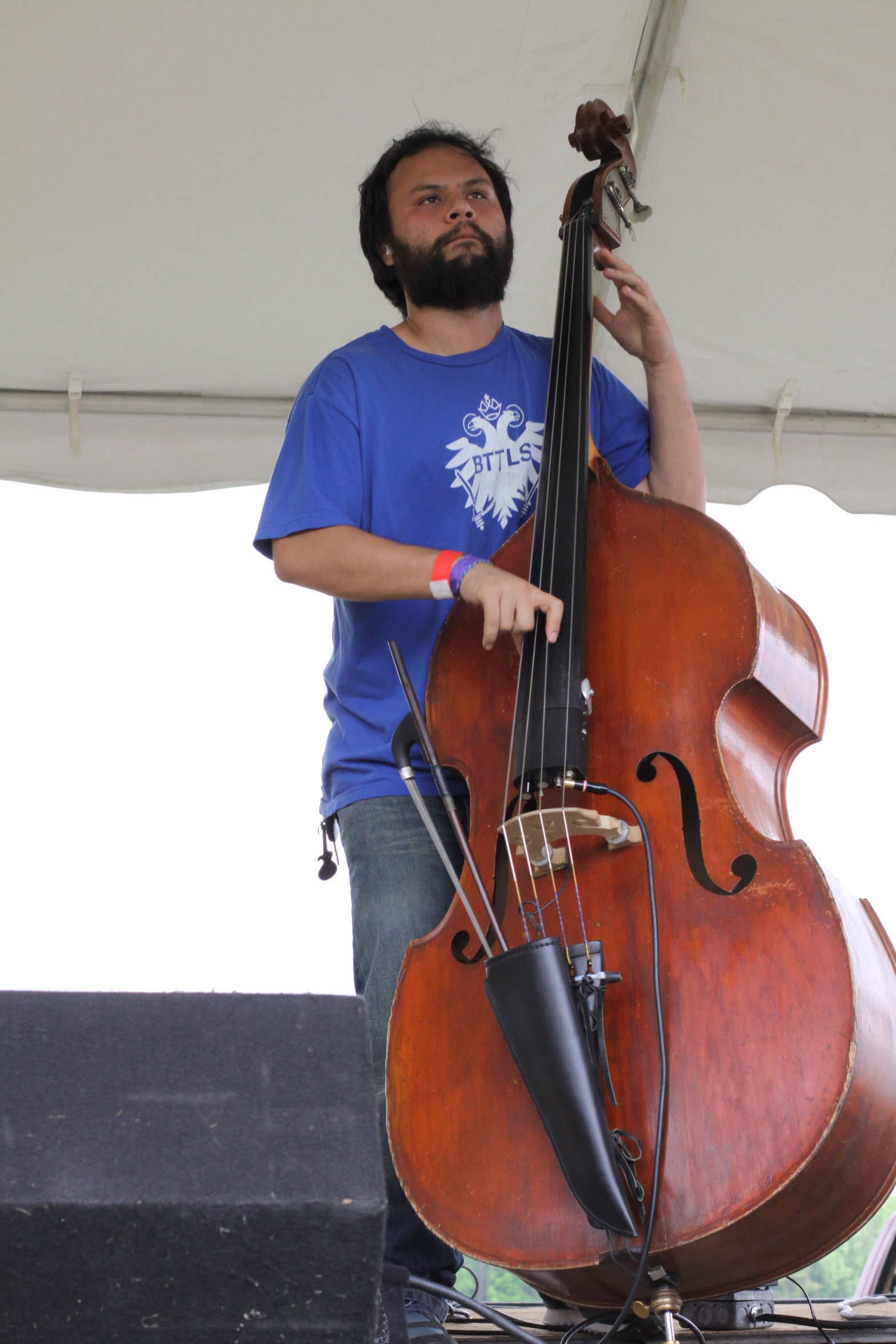
Bassist Joshua Machiz

Current

- Dan Bruskewicz - vocals, guitar, harmonica (2008–present)
- Dan Martino (aka Dan Cask) - percussion, backing vocals (2008–present)
- Joshua Machiz - bass (2010–present)
- Josh Olmstead - guitar (2013–present)

Former

- Joshua Willis - bass, banjo, backing vocals (2009-2010)
- Kevin Conner - guitar (2010-2013)
- Johnny Bee - bass (2008-2009)

== Discography ==
- Hinterlands EP (2009)
- Idiots (2010)
- Manufacturing Joy (2012)
- KONG EP (2014)
- Dancing Out the Door (2017)
