= Family (Think About Life album) =

Studio album by Think About Life
- Released: May 26, 2009
- Recorded: Friendship Cove, Montreal, Quebec
- Genres: Indie rock; experimental rock; electronic rock; dance-rock
- Label: Alien8 Recordings

Think About Life chronology
Think About Life (2006)	Family (2009)

Family is the second album by Think About Life, released on May 26, 2009.

In a favourable review, critic Ben Rayner singled out the songs "Johanna" ("think digital-age Sly & The Family Stone") and "Sofa-bed", "which sounds like TV on the Radio with a clearer sense of melody."

== Track listing ==
1. "Johanna"
2. "Havin' My Baby"
3. "Sweet Sixteen"
4. "Young Hearts"
5. "Wizzzard"
6. "Set You On Fire"
7. "Sofa-bed"
8. "The Veldt"
9. "Nueva Nueva"
10. "Life Of Crime"

== Personnel ==
- Martin Cesar – Vox/Beats
- Graham Van Pelt – Guitar/Vox/Sequences/Sounds
- Matt Shane – Drums/Vox
