= Nadja (band) =

Canadian band

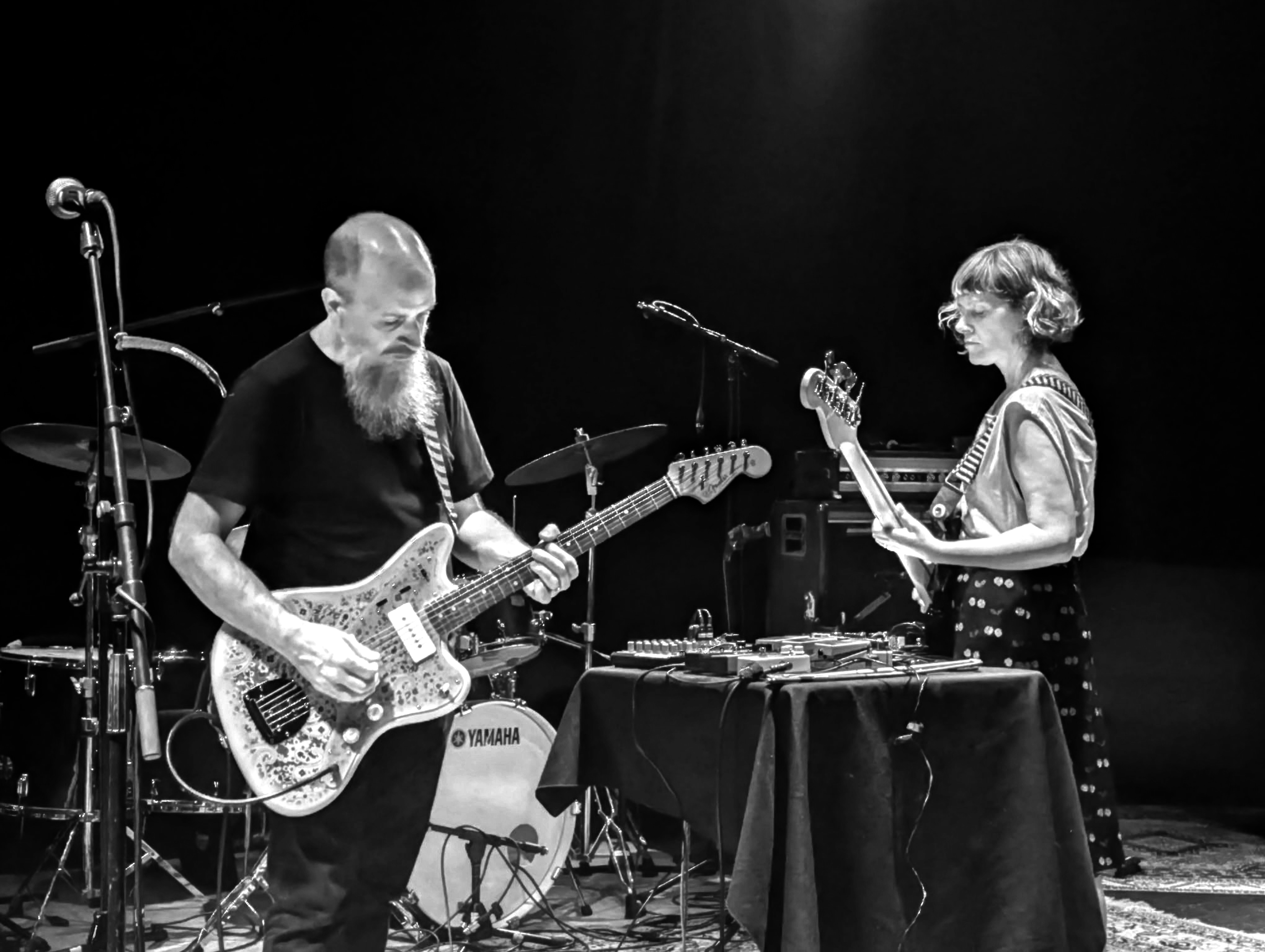
- Nadja live in Toronto, Canada, 2025

Background information
- Origin: Toronto, Canada
- Genres: Drone metal, post-metal
- Years active: 2003–present
- Label: Various
- Members: Aidan Baker; Leah Buckareff
- Website: nadjaluv.ca

Nadja is a Canadian duo of Aidan Baker (guitars, vocals, piano, woodwinds, drums) and Leah Buckareff (bass, vocals). Nadja began in 2003 as a solo project for Baker to explore the heavier and noisier side of his experimental ambient music performed mainly on the electric guitar. In 2005, Buckareff joined in order to make the project more than just a studio endeavour and to allow Nadja to perform live.

The band's name comes from Aidan's name spelled backwards in order to match the concept of a musical style different from his own work. The J replacing the I is, according to Aidan, a reference to the Nadja character from André Breton's book of the same name and Elina Löwensohn's character from the 1994 vampire movie. The duo are a married couple and are based in Berlin.

== History ==
After several limited edition CD-R releases on various small labels worldwide, Nadja released its first official album Truth Becomes Death on Montreal's Alien8 Recordings in 2005. The duo has since released material on wider distributed labels and went through re-releasing older recordings either remastered or completely re-arranged, such as the newer Touched 2007 version back on Alien8 or the Bodycage album on Profound Lore Records/LP version on Equation.

They have performed in Canada, Belgium, the Netherlands, Finland, the United Kingdom, Argentina, Brazil, Chile, Japan, Norway and the United States, sharing the stage with, among others, artists as Kayo Dot, Knurl, Khanate, Francisco López, Isis, thisquietarmy, BHUTAN drone, stilte, Dronevil and Mare.

== Musical style ==
The duo combines soundscape, electronics and atmospheric vocals with slow, epic riffs and dirge-like percussion, creating a slowly moving grand wall of music that has been described as doomgaze, drone, ambient-doom, and shoegazer-metal. Aidan noted that they prefer to call their style of music "ambient metal" or "ambient doom", though he is fond of the term "dreamsludge" as well.

== Line-up ==
- Aidan Baker – Guitars, piano, programming, woodwinds, vocals (2002–present)
- Leah Buckareff – Bass, vocals, violin (2003–present)

== Discography ==
=== Full-length ===
- Touched (2003), CD-R: Deserted Factory Records
- Skin Turns to Glass (2003), CD-R: NOTHingness REcords
- Corrasion CD-R: (2003), Foreshadow Productions
- Bodycage (2005), CD-R: NOTHingness REcords, (2006), CD: NOTHingness REcords, (2008), 2LP: Equation Records
- Bliss Torn from Emptiness (2005), CD-R: Fargone Records
- Truth Becomes Death (2005), CD: Alien8 Recordings, (2008) 2LP: Conspiracy Records
- Thaumogenesis (2007), CD: aRCHIVE Recordings LP + untitled CD: IMPORTANT RECORDS
- Radiance of Shadows (2007), CD: Alien8 Recordings, (2008) 2LP: Conspiracy Records
- Desire in Uneasiness (2008), CD: Crucial Blast Records
- The Bungled & the Botched (2008), CD: Consouling Sounds, (2009) LP: Blocks Recording Club
- Belles Bêtes (2009), CD/LP: Beta-lactam Ring Records
- When I See the Sun Always Shines on T.V. [Cover album] (2009), CD: The End Records
- Under the Jaguar Sun (2009), 2CD/2LP: Beta-lactam Ring Records
- Autopergamene (2010), CD: Essence Music
- Don't Bring Me Monkeys [Cover album] (2011), Digital: Self Released
- Dagdrøm (2012), CD/LP: Broken Spine Productions
- Flipper (2013), Digital/LP: Oaken Palace Records
- Queller (2014), CD/LP: Essence Music
- Sv (2016), CD: Essence Music
- The Stone is Not Hit By the Sun, Nor Carved with a Knife (2016), CD/LP: Gizeh Records
- Sonnborner (2018), LP: Broken Spine Productions, CD: Daymare Recordings
- Seemannsgarn (2021), Digital: Broken Spine Productions
- Luminous Rot (2021), Digital: Southern Lord Recordings
- Labrinthine (2022), CD: Broken Spine Productions
- Jumper (2024), Digital, Southern Lord Recordings
- Cut (2025), Digital, Broken Spine Productions

=== Compilations ===
- Numbness (2009), CD: Happy Prince
- Excision (2012), 2CD/digital: Important Records
- Numbed (2019)
- The Drone Mixes (2020), Broken Spine Productions
- Trilogy Nadja and Vampillia (2021), Bad Moon Rising

=== EPs ===
- I Have Tasted the Fire Inside Your Mouth (2004), CD-R: Deserted Factory Records
- Base Fluid (2007), Digital: Foreshadow Productions
- Guilted by the Sun (2007), CDEP & LP: Roadburn Records
- Long Dark Twenties (2008), LP Single: Anthem Records
- Trinity (2008), CD: Die Stadt Records
- Trinitarian (2008), LP: Important Records
- Clinging to the Edge of the Sky (2009), LP: Adagio830/ Vendetta a.k.a. xmesserx03
- Ruins of Morning (2010), 10" : Substantia Innominata
- Sky Burial (2010), CD/LP: Latitudes/ Southern Records
- Uneasy and Confin'd (2012), LP: Cold Spring Records
- Tangled (2014), 7" : Broken Spine Productions
- Songs for Wong Kar Wai (2015), CD-R/Digital: Wist Rec./Broken Spine Productions
- BSP Live Series: 2023-01-26 Berlin (2023), Broken Spine Productions

=== Splits and collaborations ===
- Split with Moss (2003), CD-R: Foreshadow Productions
- Absorption with Methadrone (2005), CD-R, NOTHingness REcords
- We Have Departed the Circle Blissfully with Fear Falls Burning (2006), LP: Conspiracy Records
- 12012291920/1414101 with Atavist (2007), CD: Invada Records/ LP Kreation Records
- S/T Nadja with Fear Falls Burning (2007), CD: Conspiracy Records
- Live collaboration with Datashock (2007), Meudiademorte / Hlava Temple
- magma to ice Nadja/ Netherworld (2008), CD: Fario
- Untitled release with Year of No Light, Fear Falls Burning and Machu Picchu Mother Future(2008) LP: MusicFearSatan
- Christ Send Light with Black Boned Angel (2008), CD/LP: Battlecruiser / Sound Devastation
- II: Points at Infinity with Atavist (2008), CD: Profound Lore
- Infernal Procession...And Then Everything Dies split with Atavist and Satori (2008), CD: Cold Spring
- tümpisa nadja / 5/5/2000 -(2009), CD + LP accident prone records
- Primitive North with A Storm of Light (2009), Split CD/LP: Robotic Empire
- S/T nadja / Black Boned Angel (2009), CD/LP 20 Buck Spin
- Pyramids with Nadja with Pyramids (2009), CD: Hydra Head Records
- Nadja/ Kodiak (2009), CD/ LP Denovali Records
- The Life and Death of a Wasp NADJA & OvO (2010), CD/ LP Broken Spine Records/ Adagio 830 & Vendetta Records
- Dominium Visurgis Nadja & Troum (2010), CD Transgredient Records
- NADJA & GALENA Konstruktion (2011) LP Adagio 830
- The Primitive World with Vampillia (2012), CD is collage collective Records
- Cystema Solari Nadja and Uochi Toki (2014), LP/DIGITAL: CORPOC
- ɪmpəˈfɛkʃ(ə)n Nadja and Vampillia (2014), LP Throne Records
- Artificial Act of God Nadja and Vampillia (2018), CD Broken Spine Productions
- Split with Disrotted (2021), Bad Moon Rising
- Nalepa split with Aidan Baker (2022), LP/Digital Midira Records
- Vestigial Spectra Nadja and Fawn Limbs (2023), Roman Numeral Records

=== Rerecordings ===
- Touched (2007), CD: Alien8 Recordings, (2008) LP: Conspiracy Records
- Corrasion (2007), CD: Foreshadow Productions, (2009) LP: Basses Frequences
- Bliss Torn from Emptiness (2008), CD: Profound Lore Records
- Skin Turns to Glass (2008), CD: The End Records

=== Live albums ===
- Trembled (2006, rereleased 2008), CD: Utech Records
- Thaumoradiance (2007), CD: aRCHIVE Recordings
- Live @ Dom Club (2009)
- Live in Santiago (2014), Templo Sagital
- Thaumoburial (2020), Broken Spine Productions
- Querétaro (2024)
- BSP Live Series: 2025-01-04 Hong Kong (2025), Broken Spine Productions
- Seemannsgarn (Church in Session) (2026), Broken Spine Productions

=== DVD ===
- White Nights/Drone Fields (2010), Beta-lactam Ring Records
