= Oaken Palace Records =

British independent music label

- Founded: August 2012
- Founder: Sven Lohrey
- Distributor: The Business
- Genre: Drone, psychedelic
- Country of origin: UK
- Location: Birmingham, West Midlands
- Official website: www.oakenpalace.com

Oaken Palace Records is an independent record label based in Birmingham, England. The label is a registered charity with 100% of the profits donated to organisations supporting endangered species.

Each release is dedicated to an endangered species of the artist's choosing, and all the profits from the release are donated to an organisation dedicated to helping that species. The records are produced as environmentally-friendly as possible: the sleeves are made of 100% recycled cardboard, printed with non-toxic inks, and with carbon neutral record pressing. As of June 2016 they have raised over £5,200.

== Catalogue ==
| Year | Cat. No. | Artist | Title | Animal | Organisation |
|---|---|---|---|---|---|
| 2013 | OAK-001 | Parallel Lines | White Fur /// Black Cathedral | Polar bear | Polar Bears International |
| 2013 | OAK-002 | Caudal | Forever on Another World | European ground squirrel | Austrian Union for Nature Preservation |
| 2013 | OAK-003 | Nadja | Flipper | Whales and dolphins | Whale and Dolphin Conservation Society |
| 2014 | OAK-004 | Plurals | Bugenès Melissae | Bumblebee | Bumblebee Conservation Trust |
| 2014 | OAK-005 | Eternal Tapestry | Guru Overload | Orangutan | Borneo Orangutan Survival |
| 2015 | OAK-006 | thisquietarmy | Insect Kingdom | Insects | Montreal Insectarium |
| 2015 | OAK-007 | Blown Out | Planetary Engineering | Aye-aye | Durrell Wildlife Conservation Trust |
| 2015 | OAK-008 | Expo '70 | Kinetic Tones | Flores hawk-eagle | EDGE of Existence programme |
| 2016 | OAK-009 | Hellvete / Bear Bones, Lay Low | Spliff Tape | Radiated tortoise | Turtle Survival Alliance |
| 2016 | OAK-010 | Merzbow | Kākāpō | Kākāpō | Kākāpō Recovery trust |
| 2017 | OAK-011 | Phurpa | Sacred Sounds 18.12.16 | Amur leopard | Amur Leopard and Tiger Alliance |
| 2017 | OAK-012 | Phurpa | Sacred Sounds 22.1.17 | Amur tiger | Amur Leopard and Tiger Alliance |
| 2018 | OAK-013 | Louise Landes Levi | IKIRU or The Wanderer | Monarch butterfly | Monarch Butterfly Conservation Fund |
| 2018 | OAK-014 | GOLD | Faces I Don’t Recall – The Optimist Remixes | White-backed vulture | Raptor Conservation Program |
| 2018 | OAK-015 | Woven Skull | Woven Skull | Red squirrel | Red Squirrel Survival Trust |
| 2019 | OAK-016 | Vibracathedral Orchestra | Squeeze the Lids Through Coming Window | Pangolin | Pangolin Conservation Fund |
| 2020 | OAK-017 | Cigvë | What Makes Them Burn | Blue-eyed ground dove | |
| 2020 | OAK-018 | Golden Ashes | In the Lugubrious Silence of Eternal Night | Hooded vulture | |
| 2020 | OAK-019 | Left Hand Cuts Off the Right | I Can Wait | Pied tamarin | |
| 2021 | OAK-020 | Bombay Lunatic Asylum | Mad Song | Masai giraffe | |
