= Par Noussss Touss Les Trous de Vos Crânes! =

Studio album by Et Sans
- Released: April 5, 2005
- Recorded: November 2003 – 2004
- Genre: Avant-garde; Experimental rock
- Length: 45:25
- Label: Alien8 Recordings ALIEN25

Et Sans chronology
Mi La Le Mémoire Est Chasse La Mille Voix Têtes De Tête Dans De Sa Ris Neige: Le Monstre Absent (2004)	Par Noussss Touss Les Trous de Vos Crânes! (2005)

Professional ratings
Review scores
Source	Rating
Allmusic	3/5 stars
Pitchfork Media	(7.1/10)

Par Noussss Touss Les Trous de Vos Crânes! is the second album of Et Sans. It was released in April 2005 by Alien8 Recordings, their first album on the record label.

The album is composed of four tracks, of which three go above the ten-minute mark. The titles of the tracks are semi-sensical French sentences, and in several cases, spaces between words are deliberately misplaced or absent. It was recorded after expanding the band by recruiting Felix Morel, Sophie Trudeau, and Stephen de Oliveira for various instrumental purposes.

== Track listing ==
1. "La Chose Nue Nue Nue du l'Amoncellement Spectral du Mal" – 5:22
2. "Une Bouche Végétale, Des Créatures Soufflent des Sécrétions du Tout Fout le Camp" – 18:45
3. "Mademoiselle Ogive, Un Tremblement Osseux dans le Derrière" – 10:12
4. "Les Courbes Sanglantes Entendues de l'Organe Trop Vraíment Halluciné" – 11:19

== Personnel ==
=== Et Sans ===
- Roger Tellier-Craig – vocals, farfisa, maxi-korg, digital arrangements
- Alexandre St-Onge – vocals, electronics, bass
- Stephen de Oliveira – vocals, electronics (tracks 1 & 2)
- Sophie Trudeau – vocals (tracks 2 & 3), violin (track 2)
- Felix Morel – drums (tracks 2 & 4)

=== Technical ===
- Harris Newman – engineer
- Thierry Amar – engineer, mixing
