= Was I the Wave? =

Studio album by Miracle Fortress
- Released: April 26, 2011
- Recorded: Montreal, Quebec
- Genre: Electronica
- Length: 39:06
- Label: Secret City Records
- Producer: Graham Van Pelt

Miracle Fortress chronology
Five Roses (2007)	Was I the Wave? (2011)

Was I the Wave? is the second studio album by Miracle Fortress, released on April 26, 2011. The album departs from the indie rock of Five Roses, and is instead more of an electronic offering. As with Five Roses, all songs were composed, arranged, performed, produced, and engineered by Graham Van Pelt. For live performances, Van Pelt is accompanied on-stage by fellow Think About Life bandmate Greg Napier.

== Reception ==
Professional ratings
Review scores
Source	Rating
Montreal Gazette	4/5 stars
All Music	3/5 stars

On its release, the album received a favourable review in the Montreal Gazette from Bernard Perusse, garnering a rating of 4 out of 5 stars.

The album was named as a longlisted nominee for the 2011 Polaris Music Prize.

== Track listing ==
1. "Awe" - 2:33
2. "Tracers" - 4:48
3. "Raw Spectacle" - 6:01
4. "Wave" - 1:34
5. "Spectre" - 5:13
6. "Everything Works" - 4:01
7. "Before" - 1:40
8. "Miscalculations" 5:27
9. "Immanent Domain" - 5:51
10. "Until" - 1:58

== Personnel ==
- Graham Van Pelt
- Greg Napier - live performances only
