= Alien8 Recordings =

Canadian independent record label

- Founded: 1996
- Founder: Sean O'Hara; Gary Worsley
- Genre: Noise music
- Country of origin: Canada
- Location: Montreal, Quebec

Alien8 Recordings is an independent record label founded in 1996 in Montreal, Quebec, Canada. The label was founded by Sean O'Hara and Gary Worsley.

The label released material from prominent noise artists such as Merzbow, Think About Life, Aube, Keiji Haino, Masonna, MSBR, Francisco López, Bastard Noise, and Daniel Menche, as well as electronic artists such as Tim Hecker, Lesbians on Ecstasy, Les Georges Leningrad, and Books on Tape. Alien8 also is known for releasing the 2003 debut of indie-pop band The Unicorns. It also had two sub-labels, Fancy Recordings and Substractif, which released music from 2001 to 2004.

In 2018, Worsley bought Montreal's famed record store Cheap Thrills, where he had been working since 1998.

Alien8 has not released any music since 2011. The last post on its website is dated December 2012. The website went offline in 2022.

== Discography ==
| Cat. No. | Artist | Recording |
|---|---|---|
| ALIENCD 001 | Merzbow | Akasha Gulva (1996) |
| ALIENCD 002 | Aube | Cardiac Strain (1997) |
| ALIENCD 003 | Keiji Haino | So, Black Is Myself (1997) |
| ALIENCD 004 | Merzbow | Space Metalizer (1997) |
| ALIENCD 005 | David Kristian | Cricklewood (1997) |
| ALIENCD 006 | Aube / Knurl | Split (1997) |
| ALIENCD 007 | Masonna | Frequency LSD (1998) |
| ALIENCD 008 | David Kristian / Sian | Tacoma Narrows / Someday Anywhere (1998) |
| ALIENCD 009 | M.S.B.R. / Kengo Tuchi | One (1998) |
| ALIENCD 010 | Merzbow | Aqua Necromancer (1998) |
| ALIENCD 011 | Loren Mazzacane Connors | In Twilight (1998) |
| ALIENCD 012 | Knurl | Torus (1999) |
| ALIENCD 013 | Alexandre St-Onge | Image / Négation (1999) |
| ALIENCD 014 | Various | Coalescence (2001) |
| ALIENCD 015 | David Kristian | Woodworking (1999) |
| ALIENCD 016 | David Kristian | Beneath the Valley of the Modulars (1998) |
| ALIENCD 017 | Merzbow | Door Open at 8 am (1999) |
| ALIENCD 018 | Bastard Noise | The Analysis of Self-Destruction (2000) |
| ALIENCD 019 | David Kristian | Room Tone (1999) |
| ALIENCD 020 | Francisco López | Untitled #104 (2000) |
| ALIENLP 021 | Aube | Sensorial Inducement (2000) |
| ALIENCD 022 | Shalabi Effect | Shalabi Effect (2000) |
| ALIENCD 023 | Tomas Jirku | Variants (2000) |
| ALIENCD 024 | Monstre | Sucre 3 (2001) |
| ALIENCD 025 | Christof Migone | Quieting (2001) |
| ALIENCD 026 | Artificial Memory Trace / Brume | 1st Encounter (2001) |
| ALIENCD 027 | Keiji Haino | Abandon All Words at a Stroke, So That Prayer Can Come Spilling Out (2001) |
| ALIENCD 028 | David Kristian, Sam Shalabi, Alexandre St-Onge | Kristian, Shalabi, St-Onge (2001) |
| ALIENCD 029 | Sam Shalabi | On Hashish (2001) |
| ALIENCD 030 | Set Fire to Flames | Sings Reign Rebuilder (2001) |
| ALIENCD 031 | Francisco López | Untitled #123 (2002) |
| ALIENCD 032 | Shalabi Effect | The Trial of St. Orange (2002) |
| ALIENLP 033 | Tanakh | Villa Claustrophobia (2002) |
| ALIENCD 034 | Acid Mothers Temple and the Melting Paraiso U.F.O. | Electric Heavyland (2002) |
| ALIENCD 035 | Francisco López | Addy en el país de las frutas y los chunches (2003) |
| ALIENCD 036 | Daniel Menche | Beautiful Blood (2003) |
| ALIENCD 037 | Sam Shalabi | Osama (2003) |
| ALIENCD 038 | Merzbow | Animal Magnetism (2003) |
| ALIENCD 039 | Set Fire to Flames | Telegraphs in Negative/Mouths Trapped in Static (2003) |
| ALIENCD 040 | Soft Canyon | Broken Spirit, I Will Mend Your Wings (2003) |
| ALIENLP 041 | The Unicorns | Who Will Cut Our Hair When We're Gone? (2003) |
| ALIENCD 042 | Shalabi Effect | Pink Abyss (2004) |
| ALIENCD 043 | Tanakh | Dieu Deuil (2004) |
| ALIENCD 044 | Acid Mothers Temple and the Melting Paraiso U.F.O. | Mantra of Love (2004) |
| ALIENCD 045 | Les Georges Leningrad | Deux Hot Dogs Moutarde Chou (2004) |
| ALIENCD 046 | Molasses | Trouble at Jinx Hotel (2004) |
| ALIENCD 047 | Tim Hecker | Mirages (2004) |
| ALIENCD 048 | Tanakh | Tanakh (2004) |
| ALIENCD 049 | Les Georges Leningrad | Sur les Traces de Black Eskimo (2004) |
| ALIENCD 050 | Mecha Fixes Clock | Orbiting With Screwdrivers (2004) |
| ALIENCD 051 | Lesbians on Ecstasy | Lesbians on Ecstasy (2004) |
| ALIENCD 052 | Et Sans | Par Noussss Touss Les Trous de Vos Crânes! (2005) |
| ALIENCD 053 | Various | Blank Field (2005) |
| ALIENCD 054 | Francisco López | Live in Montreal (2005) |
| ALIENCD 055 | Kiss Me Deadly | Amoreux Cosmiques (2005) |
| ALIENCD 056 | Lesbians on Ecstasy | Giggles in the Dark (2005) |
| ALIENCD 057 | Kiss Me Deadly | Misty Medley (2005) |
| ALIENCD 058 | Nadja | Truth Becomes Death (2005) |
| ALIENCD 059 | Glen Hall / Lee Ranaldo / William Hooker | Oasis of Whispers (2005) |
| ALIENCD 060 | Books on Tape | Dinosaur Dinosaur (2005) |
| ALIENCD 061 | Shalabi Effect | Unfortunately (2005) |
| ALIENCD 062 | Acid Mothers Temple | Starless and Bible Black Sabbath (2006) |
| ALIENCD 063 | Tanakh | Ardent Fevers (2006) |
| ALIENCD 064 | Francisco López | Untitled #180 (2006) |
| ALIENCD 065 | Think About Life | Think About Life (2006) |
| ALIENCD 066 | Tim Hecker | Radio Amor (2007) |
| ALIENCD 067 | Nadja | Touched (2007) |
| ALIENCD 069 | Lesbians on Ecstasy | We Know You Know (2007) |
| ALIENCD 070 | Alexandre St-Onge | Mon animal est possible (2007) |
| ALIENCD 071 | Torngat | You Could Be (2007) |
| ALIENCD 072 | Nadja | Radiance of Shadows (2007) |
| ALIENCD 073 | CPC Gangbangs | Mutilation Nation (2007) |
| ALIENCD 074 | Sam Shalabi | Eid (2008) |
| ALIENCD 075 | Menace Ruine | Cult of Ruins (2008) |
| ALIENCD 076 | Duchess Says | Anthologie des 3 Perchoirs (2008) |
| ALIENCD 077 | Francisco López | TechnoCalyps (2008) |
| ALIENCD 078 | Think About Life | Family (2009) |
| ALIENCD 079 | Zbigniew Karkowski & Daniel Menche | Unleash (2008) |
| ALIENCD 080 | Aun | Motorsleep (2009) |
| ALIENCD 081 | Aidan Baker & Tim Hecker | Fantasma Parastasie (2008) |
| ALIENCD 082 | Menace Ruine | The Die is Cast (2008) |
| ALIENCD 083 | Torngat | La Petite Nicole (2009) |
| ALIENCD 084 | Acid Mothers Temple & The Melting Paraiso U.F.O. | Lord of the Underground: Vishnu and the Magic Elixir (2009) |
| ALIENCD 085 | Black Feelings | Black Feelings (2009) |
| ALIENCD 086 | Duchess Says / Red Mass | Fire Baptized Species / Red Mass (2009) |
| ALIENCD 087 | Aidan Baker | Liminoid / Lifeforms (2010) |
| ALIENCD 088 | Blessure Grave | Judged By Twelve Carried By Six (2010) |
| ALIENCD 089 | Tim Hecker | Haunt Me, Haunt Me Do It Again (2001) |
| ALIENCD 090 | Acid Mothers Temple & The Melting Paraiso U.F.O. | Pink Lady Lemonade ~ You're from Inner Space (2011) |
| ALIENCD 091 | Picastro + Nadja | Fool, Redeemer (2011) |
| ALIENCD 093 | Duchess Says | In a Fung Day T! (2011) |
| ALIENCDR 001 | Dreamcatcher | Holysmokes: Live at CKUT 90.3 FM (2005) |
| ALIENDR 001 | Thisquietarmy | Transmissions (2009) |
| FANCYCD 001 | Molasses | You'll Never Be Well No More (1999) |
| FANCYCD 002 | Molasses | Trilogie: Toil and Peaceful Life (2000) |
| FANCYCD 003 | Hrsta | L'éclat du ciel était insoutenable (2001) |
| FANCYCD 005 | Molasses | A Slow Messe (2003) |
| SUBSF 001 | Mitchell Akiyama | Hope That Lines Don't Cross (2001) |
| SUBSF 002 | Tomas Jirku | Immaterial (2001) |
| SUBSF 003 | Tim Hecker | Haunt Me, Haunt Me Do It Again (2001) |
| SUBSF 004 | Tim Hecker | My Love Is Rotten to the Core (2002) |
| SUBSF 005 | Polmo Polpo | The Science of Breath (2002) |
| SUBSF 007 | Daniel Menche | Eye on the Steel (2002) |

== See also ==
- List of record labels
