= Radiance of Shadows =

Studio album by Nadja
- Released: October 8, 2007
- Genre: Drone metal, noise rock, ambient
- Length: 79:52
- Label: Alien8, Conspiracy Records

Nadja chronology
Guilted by the Sun (2007)	Radiance of Shadows (2007)	Thaumoradiance (2008)

Professional ratings
Review scores
Source	Rating
Dusted	favorable
Hour	4.5/5 stars
Pitchfork	8.2/10
Sputnikmusic	4/5 stars

Radiance of Shadows is the eighth full-length by Canadian drone doom band Nadja, released on October 8, 2007, by Alien8 Recordings.

== Track listing ==
No.	Title	Length
1.	"Now I Am Become Death, the Destroyer of Worlds"	23:27
2.	"I Have Tasted the Fire Inside Your Mouth"	27:26
3.	"Radiance of Shadows"	28:59
Total length:		79:52

== Personnel ==
- Aidan Baker – guitar, vocals, piano, woodwinds, drums
- Leah Buckareff – bass guitar, vocals
