= The Thing About Love =

The Thing About Love may refer to:

- "The Thing About Love", a 2007 song by Alicia Keys from As I Am
- "The Thing About Love", a 2017 song by Matt Terry from Trouble
