= Les Georges Leningrad =

Canadian experimental/punk rock group

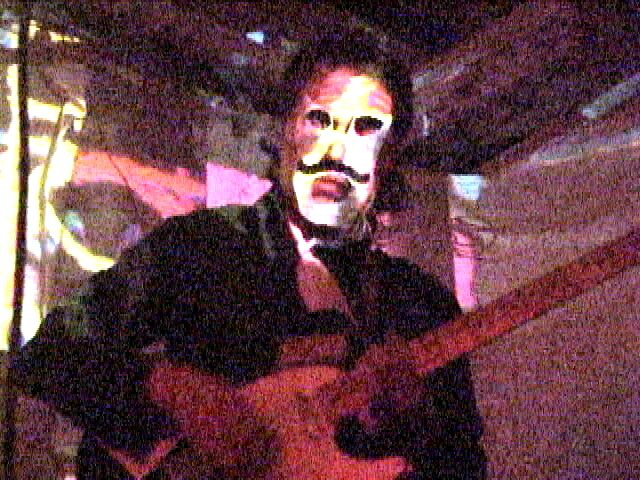
- @ Mighty Robot, Brooklyn - Oct 03

Background information
- Origin: Montreal, Quebec, Canada
- Genres: Experimental rock
- Years active: 1999–2007
- Labels: Les Records Coco Cognac; Alien8; Troubleman Unlimited; Tomlab
- Past members: Poney P Mingo L'Indien; Bobo Boutin; Toundra LaLouve
- Website: lesgeorgesleningrad.org

Les Georges Leningrad were a Canadian experimental rock and punk rock group based in Montreal, Quebec.

Les Georges Leningrad were known for their extravagant stage costumes, including masks in particular. They frequently gave contradictory, incomprehensible or ludicrous answers to interviewers' questions. They have been elected twice "freakiest local act" by the readers of the weekly newspaper Montreal Mirror.

== History ==
Les Georges Leningrad formed in 1999 in Montreal. The members took turns at bass, keyboard, guitar, drums and vocals, sometimes using a drum machine. The band originally consisted of four members; they were reduced to a trio with the departure of bassist Toundra LaLouve after their first album was released. The band produced several albums, including Sur les Traces de Black Eskimo in 2004.

In 2007, the band created the score for Asparagus: A Horticultural Ballet, which was performed at Conway Hall in London, England.

After announcing in early 2007 on their MySpace page that they had broken up, Les Georges Leningrad now say that they may play more shows sometime in the future.

== Members ==
- Poney P (vocals)
- Mingo L'Indien (keyboards, guitar)
- Bobo Boutin (drums)

== Discography ==
- 2002 Made In Taiwan
- 2002 Deux Hot Dogs Moutarde Chou (Les Records Coco Cognac)
- 2004 Sur les Traces de Black Eskimo (Alien8 Recordings)
- 2005 Supa Doopa Remix (Troubleman Unlimited)
- 2006 Sangue Puro (Dare to Care Records, Tomlab)

== See also ==
- List of bands from Canada
