= Think About Life (album) =

Studio album by Think About Life
- Released: May 2, 2006
- Recorded: Friendship Cove, Montreal, Quebec
- Genres: Indie rock; experimental rock; electronic rock; dance-rock
- Length: 34:38
- Label: Alien8 Recordings

Think About Life chronology
Think About Life (2006)	Family (2009)

Professional ratings
Review scores
Source	Rating
Allmusic	3/5 stars
Stylus Magazine	(B)

Think About Life is self-titled debut album by Think About Life.

== Track listing ==
1. "Paul Cries" – 3:15
2. "Bastian and the Boar" – 2:27
3. "Commander Riker's Party" – 2:54
4. "Fireworks" – 2:54
5. "Money" – 4:52
6. "In Her Hands" – 3:04
7. "Serious Chords" – 3:14
8. "What the Future Might Be" (feat. Subtitle) – 2:28
9. "(slow-motion slam-dunk from the free-throw line)" – 1:37
10. "The Blue Sun" – 7:53

== Personnel ==
- Martin Cesar – Vocals (Drums on "The Blue Sun")
- Graham Van Pelt – Keyboards / Vocals
- Matt Shane – Drums (Vocals on "The Blue Sun")
- Subtitle – Guest vocals on "What the Future Might Be"
- Chloe Lum – Guest noises on "Commander Riker's Party" and "In Her Hands"
- Gordon Krieger - clarinet on "Money"
