= SS Cardiacs =

Canadian indie rock band

- Origin: Toronto, Ontario, Canada
- Genres: Indie rock
- Years active: 2004–2005
- Labels: Blocks, Out Of Touch
- Past members: Jessie Stein; Andy Lloyd; Dana Snell; Leon Taheny; Mike Small; Owen Pallett

SS Cardiacs was a Canadian indie rock band, briefly active in the early 2000s. It consisted of Jessie Stein on vocals and guitar, Andy Lloyd on bass, and Dana Snell on drums.

== History ==
SS Cardiacs formed in Toronto in 2004. They performed as part of Canada Music Week in March, 2005. That year the band released its sole album, Fear the Love, on Blocks in 2005. Stein's brother, José Miguel Contreras of By Divine Right, also participated in the album's recording. Fear the Love appeared on the !earshot campus and community radio chart in June.

Shortly after the album's release, Lloyd and Snell left the band due to internal tensions, and Stein instead toured to support the album with a lineup that included Leon Taheny, The Meligrove Band's Mike Small and keyboardist Owen Pallett. With a more robust sound, the group released one last track entitled "Oh No!" via the Volume II 7" vinyl compilation on Out Of Touch Records.

Stein subsequently retired the SS Cardiacs name, and went on to join Miracle Fortress and to form a new band, The Luyas.
