= L'Autre (Et Sans album) =

l'Autre

Studio album by Et Sans
- Released: November 15, 2001
- Recorded: At Green Cat Sound on January 21, 2001
- Genre: Avant-garde; Experimental rock
- Length: 42:17
- Label: Locust Music LOCUST2
- Producer: Dave Smith; Jace Lasek; Michael Gardiner

Et Sans chronology
l'Autre (2001)	Mi La Le Mémoire Est Chasse La Mille Voix Têtes De Tête Dans De Sa Ris Neige: Le Monstre Absent (2004)

Professional ratings
Review scores
Source	Rating
Allmusic	4/5 stars

l'Autre is the debut album of Et Sans, an experimental Canadian group. It was released in November 2001 by Locust Music.

The entire album consists of one song, approximately 42 minutes and 17 seconds long, named after the album title.

== Track listing ==
1. "l'Autre" – 42:17

== Personnel ==
=== Et Sans ===
- Roger Tellier-Craig – guitar, vocals
- Alexandre St-Onge – contrabass, vocals

=== Technical ===
- Crys Cole – photography
- Dave Smith – producer
- Jace Lasek – producer
- Michael Gardiner – producer
