= Shalabi Effect =

Rock band from Montreal

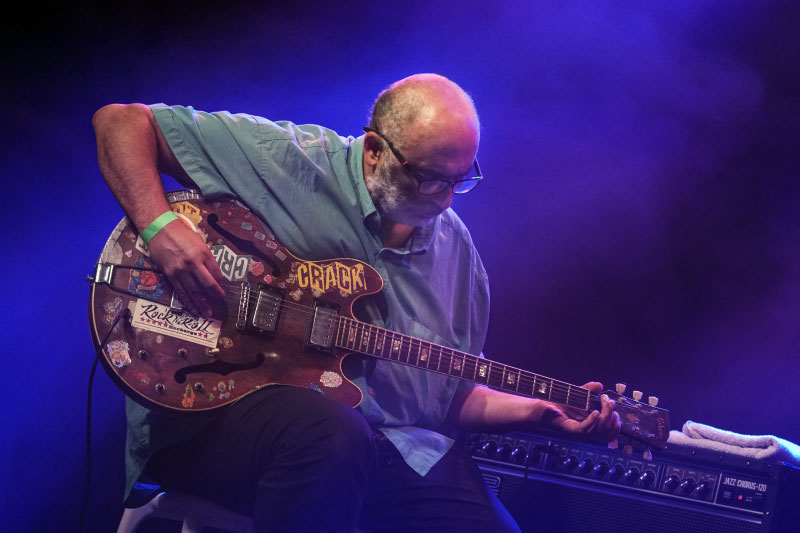
- Sam Shalabi (U-JAZZ Festival Aarhus, 2017)

Background information
- Origin: Montreal, Quebec
- Genres: Experimental rock Psychedelic rock
- Years active: 1996–present
- Labels: Alien8, Annihaya Records, Unrock
- Members: Anthony Seck; Sam Shalabi; Alexandre Saint-Onge; Will Eizlini
- Past members: John Heward
- Website: shalabieffect.com (defunct)

Shalabi Effect is a mostly instrumental band from Montreal, Quebec, Canada. The band was originally formed in 1996 as a duo composed of Anthony Seck and Sam Shalabi. Shalabi is an Egyptian-Canadian musician who is also the founder of Swamp Circuit, Detention, Nutsak, The Dwarfs of East Agouza, Moose Terrific and the orchestra Land of Kush. Seck is a filmmaker and member of the supergroup Valley of the Giants.

== History ==
Shalabi and Seck independently released their first recording, a self-titled limited-edition cassette, in 1998. They then added Montreal artist and musician Alexandre Saint-Onge on double bass, and Will Eizlini on tablas and recorded the song "Aural Florida" at Red Rocket Studios in Montreal. The 36-minute song was meant to be half of a split CD with Godspeed You! Black Emperor, produced by Alien8. Instead, Alien8 became their label and they recorded "Aural Florida" for a second time at Sound of Sound of One Hand Studios in Ottawa, along with several other songs. The result was the two-CD album Shalabi Effect, which was released in 2000. The album continues in the tradition of live improvisation based on Middle Eastern modes but with a more experimental approach. It also includes strange semi-broken electronics and a variety of odd instruments, most of which were lying around in the studio where it was recorded.

Returning from touring the United States in the autumn of 2000, the group stepped into the studio for the third time. This time with a mind to create an EP release that captured the mood of the tour. In fact the EP, entitled, The Trial of St. Orange, has a great deal more varied material, including a drum 'n bass mix. Pink Abyss, dubbed by the band as their "pop" record, was released in January 2004. In 2005, they released their fourth album, Unfortunately.

On July 18, 2007, Anthony Seck was a guest, and music from the Shalabi Effect was featured on an unscheduled "technical test" episode of Tom Green Live. Anthony Seck was again featured on Tom Green Live in March 2008 in a segment called "Shalabi with Cheese".

== Members ==
- Anthony Seck (electric guitar, lapsteel, moog, keyboards) (1996–present)
- Sam Shalabi (oud, electronics, toys) (1996–present)
- Alexandre Saint-Onge (double & electric bass, electronics, voices) (1998–present)
- Will Eizlini (percussions, electronics, trumpet, tabla) (1998–present)

== Discography ==
=== As Shalabi Effect ===
- Shalabi Effect (1998), Independent
- Shalabi Effect (2000), Alien8
- The Trial of St. Orange (2002), Alien8
- Pink Abyss (2004), Alien8
- Unfortunately (2005), Alien8
- Feign to Delight Gaiety of Gods (2012), Annihaya
- Floating Garden (2015, EP), Independent
- Friends of the Prophet 6 (2021), Unrock

=== As Sam Shalabi ===
- Luteness (2000)
- On Hashish (2001)
- Osama (2003)
- Eid (2008)
- Music For Arabs (2014)
- Isis and Osiris (2016)
- Gecko (2020)
- Shirk (2022)

=== As Anthony von Seck ===
- "My Best Friends in Exile" (2011, Experimental Farm)

=== Sam Shalabi on other albums ===
- Molasses – You'll Never Be Well No More (1999, Fancy)
- A Silver Mt. Zion – He Has Left Us Alone but Shafts of Light Sometimes Grace the Corner of Our Rooms… (2000, Constellation)
- Molasses – Trilogie: Toil & Peaceful Life (2000, Fancy)
- Kristian, Shalabi, St-Onge – Kristian, Shalabi, St-Onge (2001, Alien8)
- Detention – Warp & Woof (2001, Arrival)
- Fly Pan Am – Ceux qui inventent n'ont jamais vécu (?) (2002, Constellation)
- Fortner Anderson – Sometimes I Think (2002, Wired On Words)
- Klaxon Gueule – Grain (2002, Ambiances Magnétiques)
- Elizabeth Anka Vajagic – Stand With The Stillness Of This Day (2004, Constellation)
- Molasses – Trouble At Jinx Hotel (2004, Alien8)
- Ensemble SuperMusique – Canevas «+» (2004, Ambiances Magnétiques)
- Elizabeth Anka Vajagic – Nostalgia / Pain (2005, Constellation)
- Poseidon Council – An Sphinx Awoken (2005, No Type)
- Nutsak – You Are Going To Prison / Last Train To Nutsak, NJ (2008, Signed By Force)
- Land of Kush – Land of Kush's Egyptian Light Orchestra – Monogamy (2010, Constellation)
- Land of Kush – Against the Day (2009, Constellation)
- Matana Roberts, Sam Shalabi, Nicolas Caloia - Feldspar (2014, Tour De Bras)
