= Think About Life =

Canadian indie rock band

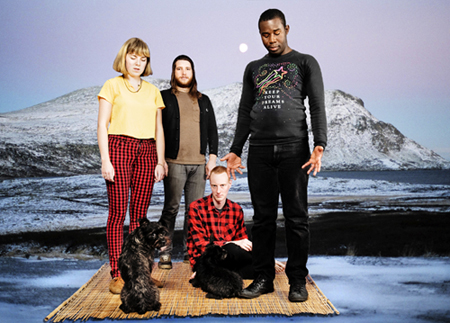

Background information
- Origin: Montreal, Quebec, Canada
- Genres: Indie rock, electronic
- Years active: 2005–2012
- Labels: Alien8, What's Your Rupture?
- Members: Martin Cesar; Graham Van Pelt; Caila Thompson-Hannant; Greg Napier
- Past members: Matt Shane; Brendan Reed
- Website: thinkaboutlife.org

Think About Life is an indie rock band from Montreal, Quebec, Canada, formed in 2005.

== Biography ==
The group was founded by drummer Matt Shane and keyboardist Graham Van Pelt. Think About Life's third member, vocalist Martin Cesar, also records and performs as Dishwasher. He has released a CD-R on Pink Triforce Tapes. Cesar also previously sang in the rock band Donkey Heart.

Graham Van Pelt is an active studio engineer in Montreal, and has engineered or produced for a number of local artists. He also has his own side project, Miracle Fortress.

Van Pelt and Shane moved into a loft space dubbed the Electric Tractor with other musician friends, and recorded the band's initial songs there.

Regarding the band's name, Shane said, "We were naming all the parts of our songs to remember them better. On [the album opener] 'Paul Cries', there's one part that sounded kind of deep. We joked that it made us think about life. Then someone said, 'Dude, I think that should be the name of the band.'"

== 2006 self-titled record ==
The band's self-titled debut recording, Think About Life, was released in 2006 by Alien8 Recordings. They began touring in the United States in late 2005, with Beaver Sheppard standing in for Martin for part of the tour, opening dates for Wolf Parade and later Art Brut. John Wenzel of The Denver Post called Think About Life "the new Liars". During this period, the band toured Canada and Japan. Montreal artist Brendan Reed recorded and toured with the band from 2007 to 2008. The band also issued a Japan exclusive Paul Cries 7" on Every Conversation Records.

== Family ==
On May 26, 2009, Think About Life released Family, their second full-length record, again on Alien8 Recordings. Shortly after the release of the album, a fourth member was added to the band. Caila Thompson-Hannant, of Miracle Fortress, Shapes and Sizes and Mozart's Sister, was recruited as a bass player and singer. Shortly thereafter, Matt Shane went on to pursue a fine arts career, and was replaced by Greg Napier, of Special Noise. On October 13, 2009, the album then saw its release in the USA. It was then released in Japan on October 27, 2009, on Escalator Records.

Since the release of Family, the band have toured with Franz Ferdinand, Ratatat, Stars, You Say Party! We Say Die!, Ponytail, and Land of Talk, amongst others.

== Reunion ==
In the summer of 2017, it was announced that the band would be performing a reunion show at the 16th edition of Pop Montreal, their first show in nearly 5 years.

== Discography ==
- 2006: Think About Life
- 2009: Family
