= Miracle Fortress =

Canadian indie rock band

- Origin: Montreal, Quebec, Canada
- Genres: Indie rock
- Years active: 2005–present
- Labels: Secret City, Rough Trade
- Members: Graham Van Pelt; Adam Waito; Jessie Stein

Miracle Fortress is a Canadian indie rock band based in Montreal, Quebec. The band's studio work is primarily a solo, project of songwriter Graham Van Pelt, who is accompanied by the rest of the band during live shows.

== Band history ==
Van Pelt, a member of the band Think About Life, recorded all of the music himself for five songs, and then self-released an EP, Watery Grave. In 2007, he released a debut album Five Roses under the name Miracle Fortress, on Secret City Records. The album received positive reviews, and was included on the shortlist for the 2007 Polaris Music Prize, which was ultimately won by Patrick Watson. Van Pelt recruited drummer Jordan Robson-Cramer of Sunset Rubdown and Magic Weapon, guitarist Jessie Stein of SS Cardiacs and The Luyas, and keyboardist Adam Waito of Telefauna to adapt Five Roses into a live show. This group made a cross-Canada tour in 2007. Nathan Ward, Adam Waito and Jessie Stein also took part in some of the shows.

The style of the band's single, "Maybe Lately", was compared by critics to that of the Beach Boys.

Miracle Fortress' third album, Was I the Wave? was released in April 2011. It was musically quite different from the previous album, with simpler instrumentation and more rhythm. The album won a GAMIQ Award for Electronic Album of the Year.

In 2014, Van Pelt continues to release music as Miracle Fortress.

== Discography ==
- Watery Grave EP (2005, self-released)
- Have You Seen In Your Dreams 12" (2007, Secret City Records, Rough Trade Records)
- Five Roses (2007, Secret City Records)
- Maybe Lately 7" (2008, Rough Trade Records)
- Was I the Wave? (2011, Secret City Records)
