= Books on Tape (artist) =

One-man electronic and rock act

Books on Tape is a one-man electronic and rock act from Los Angeles, California. With Matt Dennebaum, he formed the duo Subverse, whose sole, self-released cassette Nobody Likes You (1998). The band split shortly afterwards as their members moved to opposite coasts: Matt went to New York City, and Todd to Los Angeles.

Drootin started Books on Tape in 1999, dubbing its punk rock-influenced electronica "beatpunk", and released home recordings and demos for the first few years of the project's existence. The full-length Throw Down Your Laptops, issued on the label Deathbomb Arc in 2002, was the first release of Drootin's to have substantial distribution, and it was the first of a series of albums that followed in quick succession. These include Books on Tape Sings the Blues, released on Greyday Productions in 2003; The Business End, an EP issued in 2004, also on Greyday; and Dinosaur Dinosaur, which appeared on Alien8 Recordings in 2005. After the 2006 compilation Who Shot Ya?, Books on Tape went on hiatus until 2011, when the Still Ride EP followed; another full-length, Retired Numbers, arrived in 2012.

== Albums ==
=== Throw Down Your Laptops ===
1. Sad Song (Winter Version)
2. Smart on TV
3. The Crawl
4. Sporty But Sensible Car
5. Dance of the Drum Cadets
6. Terranaut
7. The Contenders (w/ Rose for Bohdan)
8. Hey Typical
9. Offend Your Fan Base
10. Dime a Dozen
11. Deathbomb Mafia
12. Wake Up Call
13. Replica, California

=== Books on Tape Sings The Blues ===
1. Laptop Blues
2. Republic Of
3. See You In Tokyo
4. She's Dead to Me
5. Pointe du Pied
6. Girls Up Front
7. Death in the Sex Shop
8. Siberian Soundsystem
9. Circus Animal Battle Rap (Instrumental)
10. Frisson
11. Bicycle Beat
12. Shake That
13. The Crucial
14. Unlucky Bounce
15. Sidekick
16. Church Bus

=== The Business End ===
1. The Truth, The Whole Truth, & An Assortment of Lies
2. Grey Matters
3. Patron Saints III
4. Ill Team Captain
5. People That Don't Like Me / People That I Don't Like
6. Stones to Turn, Bridges to Burn
7. Bullets
8. I Will Straight Get You Arrested
9. What Satan Said to Me

=== Dinosaur Dinosaur ===
1. Noise is Political
2. Killing Machine
3. Surly Ambassador
4. Bubblegum
5. Upon Rock City
6. When Siblings Attack
7. Fat Face
8. We Call You Nasty
9. Tom Delay
10. Seeing Things Again
11. If You Don't Live Here, Don't Surf Here
12. Kingston
13. Hands Off My Issues
14. Kitten Kitten Kitten Kitten Kitten Surprise

=== Who Shot Ya? (Remixes + Rarities) ===
1. Bubblegum (Hubba Bubba mx by numn)
2. Bubbledub (Poingly remix)
3. Bubbagumbaby (Doofgoblin remix)
4. Bubblegum (Brian Miller's Future Tense)
5. Bossy Cow (Golden Arches Mix by v.v.)
6. Bossy Cow (Teaser Mix by Octopus Inc)
7. Bossy Cow (Skinny Leather Tie Mix)
8. Demons Got Me (2006)
9. Fight Songs, Windmills, Toll Roads (2005)
10. Slinky Slur (2005)
11. Dreidel, Dreidel, Dreidel (2005)
12. Don't Mess With Texas (2000)
13. Phonographic Memory (2000)
14. Untitled (unknown)
15. Flagburning (Aa – Books on Tape remix) (2005)
16. Firebombing (Bipolar Bear – Books on Tape remix) (2005)
17. Tall Cotton (2005)
18. Fireshrub (2005 live rehearsal)
