= Knurl (band) =

Canadian noise band

- Origin: Quebec, Canada
- Genre: Noise music
- Years active: 1994–present
- Labels: Deadline; Self Abuse; Panta Rhei; Alien8; RRR; Solipsism; Harshnoise; Troniks; Gameboy; Obscurica
- Members: Alan Bloor

Knurl is the noise music project of Canadian experimental composer Alan Bloor. Based in Quebec, the composer has been performing and recording as Knurl since 1994, the year of project's seminal harsh noise release "Initial Shock."

As Knurl, Alan Bloor has released over one hundred albums internationally and has performed with Jim O'Rourke and Thurston Moore. He has also played in festivals and performances worldwide in countries such as Japan, Turkey, and the United States.

== Biography ==
Alan Bloor, originally from Windsor, Ontario, was involved in several bands in the early 80s, including a hardcore punk band called Binge of Violence. After Binge of Violence's breakup, Bloor pursued a career as a solo musician, studying jazz bass, as well as classical and flamenco guitar. In the late 1980s he began performing noise backgrounds at poetry readings in Detroit, Michigan. While performing, Bloor experimented with his bass guitar by placing metal objects on the strings to alter the timbre of the instrument (a technique often called prepared guitar).

Since that time, Bloor has delved heavily into experimentation with found objects as sound sources, including fan blades, typewriters, scrap metal and car springs. He has also supplied musical scores for performers Andrew Hammerson (ex DV-8) and Jake Brown, from the UK and Montreal respectively.

Since the beginning of 1995, Bloor has been performing solo as Knurl in Canada, the U.S., and abroad. Bloor has explored a less harsh side of noise music in his acclaimed ambient music project called Pholde.

== Music ==
Bloor's objective with his project, Knurl, is to take music and strip it entirely of its rhythm, melody, vocals, even production quality which is most associated with music today. Bloor records and performs without the assistance of computers, synthesizers or samplers. Labels that have released Knurl material include Alien8 Recordings, RRRecords, Solipsism, Harshnoise, Troniks, Gameboy, and Obscurica.

== Partial discography ==
- Initial Shock 1994 Self released- cas.
- Tetramatrix 1994 Self released- cas.
- Nervescrap 1994 Self released cassette, and later on Pure as a CD.
- Diapason- 1995 Self released- cass.
- Meatrag- 1995 Self released -cass.
- Infraneuroma-1995-Self rel. -cass.
- Headgrate -1995- Deadline-cass.
- Chain meal 1&2-1995-Self rel. cas.
- Inelastic Scattering-1996- Self Abuse Records - cass.
- Hyperflux -1996- Self rel. cass.
- Flat Bastard- 1996- Self rel. 2xcas.
- Supravital Mephitis-1996-Self rel. cass.
- Paraphasm-1996- Self rel. cass.
- Recycled-1996- RRR cass.
- HearingTrumpet/Knurl-1997-Misanthropy- 7”
- Synovial Nematics-1997- Panta Rhei-cass.
- Intrasyntax-1997-Panta Rhei- cass.
- Preparative Suppletion-1997- Panta Rhei- cass.
- Interdisciplinary Optromorphide-1997- Xerxes- cass.
- Aube/Knurl- 1997- Alien 8 Rec. CD
- Phylomonoperistalside-1998- Xerxes- CD-R
- Floritura Deuteranopia-1998- Solispsism-CD-R
- Symbioplexus-1998- Labyrinth-cass.
- Dimorphic Multiplicity-1999- Betley Welcomes Careful Drivers- cass.
- Torus-1999-Alien8 Recordings-CD-R
- Periodic Nephromucilaginosity-1999-Total Zero- CD
- Plank-1999-Spite Rec.- cass.
- Exotosemia-1999-Cohort Rec.-CD-R
- Government Alpha/Knurl-2000- M Recordings- CD-R.
- Nocicept-2000- Panta Rhei- CD-R
- Kharborundumm-2000-Panta Rhei-CD-R
- Kurtosis-2002-Harshnoise Rec.-CDR
- Thymostat-2002-Panta Rhei-cdr
- Knurl/Koryphaia-2002- Galactique Rec. CD
- Magnetomotive-2003-Gameboy Rec.- cdr
- Revoltion-2003-Panta Rhei-mini cdr
- Vorticose-2003-Panta Rhei- cdr
- Cytostatic-2004-Panta Rhei-cdr
- Triapse-2005-Panta Rhei- cdr
- Paramecium-2005-Panta Rhei- cdr
- Chromosytoma-2005-Panta Rhei-cdr
- Acidamide-2005-Harshnoise Rec. cdr
- Hematoma-2005-Obscurica-cdr
- Scyamine-2006-PACRec/Troniks-CD
- Lectophysis-2006-Pitchphase-mini cdr
- Subluxation-2007-Wintage Rec.-cdr
- Hyperplasia-2007-Brise-cul Rec.-cdr
- Invection-2007-Skeleton Dust Rec.-cdr
- Vermifuge-2007-PACRec/Troniks-CD
- Knurl/Mabus-2007-Wintage Rec.-cass.
- Triboluminescence-2008-Brise-cul Rec.-cdr
- A Hail of Blades-2008-Impulsy Stetoskopu- cdr
- Mesosoma-2009-Impulsy Setoskopu- cdr
- Knurl/ Buried Machine-2009-Wintage Rec.-cass.
- Dichromatism-2009-Panta Rhei—cdr
- Thiocarbamide-2010-Phage Tapes-CD
- Reactance-2011-Wintage Rec.-LP
- Obturation-2011-Inyrdisk-mini cdr
- Halometh-2011-Cohort Rec.-CD
- Tetrothema-2011-Banned Prod.-cass.
- Pyrolysis-2012-Terror Rec.-cass.
- Metasynogen-2013-Audio Dissection-cass.
- Knurl/RDCD-2014-TrangSao-cdr
- Knurl/Zyzaxom-2015-TrangSao-cdr
- Retinomatosis-2015-Danvers State Rec. cass.
- Thoracia-2015-Emergentism-cass.
- Ectodurotomy-2015-New Forces Rec. -cass
- Acetylphasia-2015-Impulsy Stetoskopu- cass.
- Standard Deviation-2016-Oxen Rec.-cass
- Knurl/Zyzaxom-2016-Bandcamp
- Thirunantha-2016-Panta Rhei-Bandcamp
- Parasphere-2016-Panta Rhei- Bandcamp
- Methaphase-2016-New Forces-2xcass.
- Acceptance of the Existence-2016-Level of Vulnerability-cass
- Interthiodide-2016-PantaRhei-cdr
- Knurl/Armenia/Macronympha-2016-Bizarre Audio Arts- cass
- Abrasive Interludes-2016-Temporary Trisomy Rec.- mini cdr
- The Closed Interval-2017-No Rent Rec.-cass.
- Divaritrance-2017-Walnut&Locust-mini cdr
- Phenohalasin-2017-Terror Rec.-cass.
- Knurl/Ames Sanglantes-2017-PantaRhei-cass.
- Primary Halciation-2018-PantaRhei-Bandcamp
- Knurl/Hybrid Frequency-2018-Label unknown-cass.
- Themes for a Car Crash-2018-Dark Days Ahead-cdr
- Chromiumiophage-2019-Foul Prey-cass.
- A Turbulent Obsession-2019-Absurd Exposition-cass
- Risk of Entrapment-2019-4ib Rec.-CD
- Periphoric Strain-2019-No Rent Rec.-cass.
- A Modicum of Joy-2019-Petit Soles-cass.
- The Partial Exception-2020-PantaRhei-Bandcamp, Trashfuck Rec.- cdr
- The Tide of Unreason-2020-PantaRhei-Bandcamp
- Lathyrism-2020-Nefarious Activities-cass.
- Initial Shock(re-release)-2020-Absurd Exposition-CD/DVD
- Various Artists-2020-New Forces-CD
- Knurl/Godpussy-2020-Tribe Tapes-cass.
- Plasmacyanin-2020-PantaRhei-Bandcamp
- Vengeance Bades Weary-2020-PantaRhei-Bandcamp
- Enchantments-2020-SGFF Rec.-cass.
- Phenalsyasis- 2021-Pantarhei- Bandcamp
- The Now Sacred Turmoil-2021- AAD Records- CD

Cryocarbazine- June, 2021- Rural Isolation Project.
