= The Luyas =

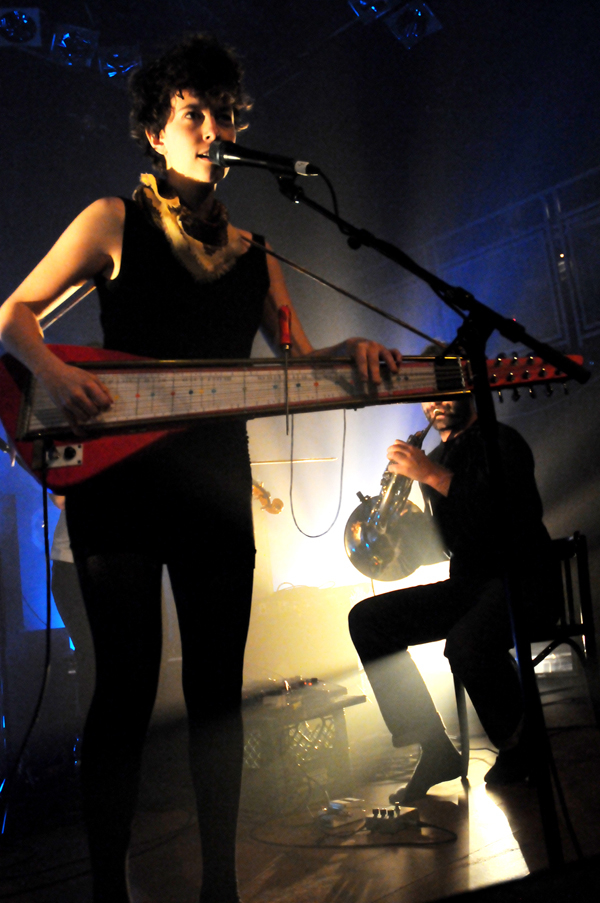
- Jessie Stein of the Luyas

Background information
- Origin: Montreal, Quebec, Canada
- Genres: Indie rock
- Years active: 2006–present
- Labels: Dead Oceans, Paper Bag Records, Idée Fixe, Pome, You've Changed
- Members: Pietro Amato; Mathieu Charbonneau; Jessie Stein; Mark "Bucky" Wheaton; Stefan Schneider (2006–2012, 2015–present)
- Website: theluyas.wordpress.com

The Luyas are a Canadian indie rock band formed in 2006 from Montreal, Quebec, Canada.

== History ==
The Luyas did their first live performance in December 2006. Their first album, Faker Death came out in August 2007, and was re-released in January 2008 on Pome Records; that label was subsequently disbanded and the album's distribution rights were picked up by You've Changed Records.

Jessie Stein, formerly active in SS Cardiacs, is also a member of Miracle Fortress. Amato and Schneider are both members of Bell Orchestre, Amato also plays in Torngat and was formerly a horn player for Arcade Fire.

The band played at the Pop Montreal festival in 2008 and the M for Montreal Festival in 2009.

The band uses an uncommon set of instruments featuring guitars, a French horn, piles of keyboards, drums and percussion. Singer/guitarist Jessie Stein expands the band's musical vocabulary when she plays the Moodswinger, a 12-string electric zither designed by the Dutch experimental luthier Yuri Landman. The band became a four-piece band with the addition of Mathieu Charbonneau in their line-up.

The Luyas were profiled by McSweeneys in the spring of 2010. In the same year the band signed to Dead Oceans for a release of their second album. Working with engineer Jeff McMurrich (Tindersticks, Constantines), The Luyas have also teamed up with friend and colleague Owen Pallett, who lent his arranging skills and violin playing to a number of tracks.

The Luyas released their second album Too Beautiful to Work on Dead Oceans in February 2011. The Canadian release of the record was also in February 2011 via a new imprint called Idée Fixe Records.

On January 9, 2012, the band announced that Stefan Schneider would no longer be playing with the band, stating, "We love him, but he's got other plans.". Schneider was replaced by former Land of Talk drummer, Mark Wheaton.

Their third studio album, Animator, was announced with an October 16, 2012, release date on Paper Bag Records. In June 2013, the album was longlisted for the 2013 Polaris Music Prize. Following Animator, Stefan Schneider rejoined the band, and the group recorded two releases featuring both Schneider and Wheaton. In September 2016, the band released the six track EP Say You through Paper Bag Records and embarked on a tour in support.

This was followed by their fourth LP, Human Voicing, which was also released on Paper Bag.

On January 31, 2023, they released their cover of Leonard Cohen's "I Can't Forget" from his 1988 album I'm Your Man.

== Members ==
- Jessie Stein (Vocals/guitars/moodswinger)
- Pietro Amato (French horn, bells, keys)
- Stefan Schneider (Drums) (2006–2012)
- Mathieu Charbonneau (Wurlitzer)
- Mark "Bucky" Wheaton (Drums) (2012–present)
- Sarah Neufeld (Violin) (2009–present)

== Discography ==
=== Albums ===
- Faker Death, 2007, re-release 2008, Pome Records
- Too Beautiful to Work, February 2011, Dead Oceans
- Animator, October 2012, Dead Oceans
- Human Voicing, February 2017

=== EPs ===
- Tiny Head/Spherical Mattress 7" 2009, Self-Released
- The Luyas/Twin Sister split 7" 2011, Dead Oceans
- Says You, September 2016

== See also ==
- Music of Canada
- Music of Quebec
- Canadian rock
- List of Canadian musicians
- List of bands from Canada
