= Aidan Baker =

Canadian musician (born 1974)

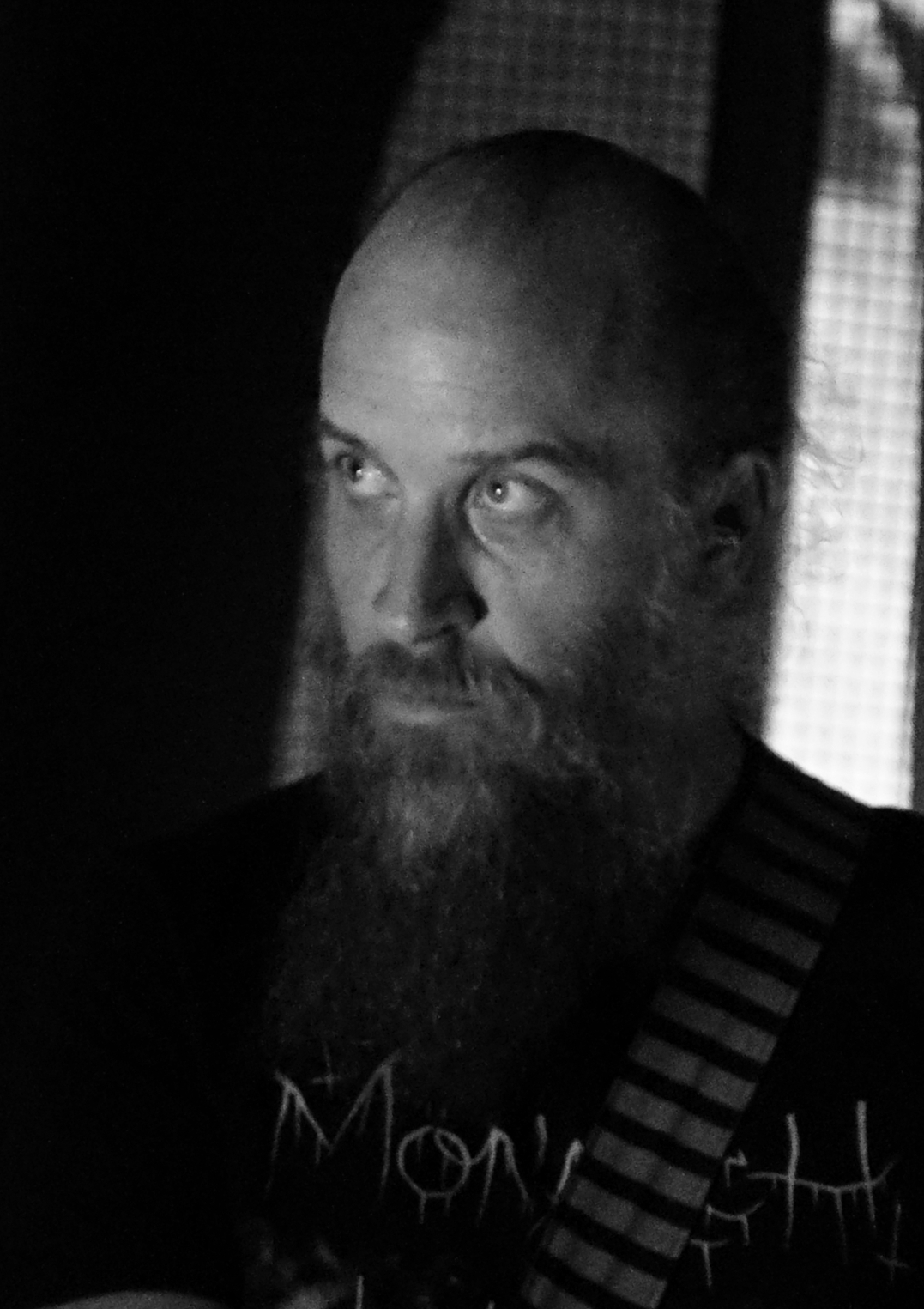
- Aidan Baker, in 2018

Background information
- Born: 1974/1975
- Origin: Toronto, Ontario, Canada
- Genres: Experimental, ambient, drone doom, post-rock, space rock
- Occupations: musician, writer, poet
- Instruments: Guitar, drums, flute, among others
- Years active: 1999–present
- Labels: Beta-lactam Ring Records, Alien8 Recordings, Important Records, Robotic Empire, Somewherecold Records
- Member of: Nadja; ARC; Adoran; B/B/S; Caudal; Infinite Light Ltd.; Mnemosyne; Scythling; Whisper Room
- Website: aidanbaker.org

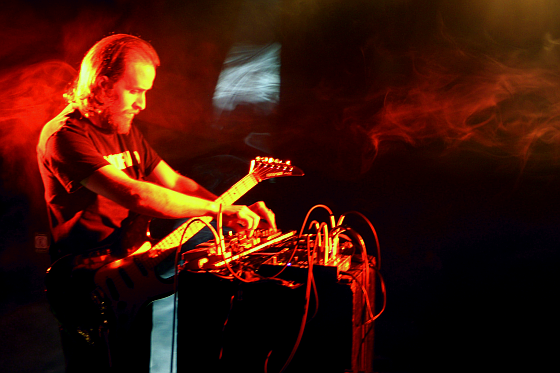
Aidan Baker, in 2008.

Aidan Baker (born 1974) is an electronic musician from Toronto, Ontario, Canada who has released numerous records both as a solo artist and as part of various side projects, including Nadja, ARC, Caudal and Mnemosyne. He has also written several books of poetry.

He has toured around the world, and has made appearances at the Unsound Festival, MUTEK, and South by Southwest. He is married to Nadja bandmate, Leah Buckareff.

== Style ==
Baker utilizes a very experimental style of playing guitar, influenced by artists such as Caspar Brötzmann, James Plotkin, Steve Albini, and Justin Broadrick. Influences on his musical structures and sound include Sonic Youth, Swans, Sunn O))), Red House Painters, Godflesh, Codeine, and PJ Harvey.

== Discography ==
*This section is considered incomplete. You can help by adding to it.

- Element (CD-R, Arcolepsy Records, 2000)
- I Fall into You (CD-R, Public Eyesore, 2002)
  - Re-released (CD, Basses Frequences, 2008)
- Letters (CD-R, Arcolepsy Records, 2002)
  - Re-released (LP, Basses Frequences, 2008)
- Pretending to Be Fearless (CD-R, Fleshmadeword, 2002)
- Repercussion (CD-R, Piehead Records, 2002)
- Rural (CD-R, Blade Records, 2002)
- Wound Culture (CD-R, Unbound Books, 2002) (soundtrack to his book of the same name)
- At the Fountain of Thirst (CD-R, Mystery Sea, 2003)
- Black Flowers Blossom (CD-R, Sonic Syrup, 2003)
- Cicatrice (CD-R, Dreamland Recordings, 2003)
- Concretion (CD-R, DTA Records, 2003)
  - Re-released (MP3, .Angle.Rec., 2007)
- Corpus Callosum (CD-R, Kolorform Records, 2003)
- Dreammares (CD-R, Mechanoise Labs, 2003)
- Eye of Day (CD-R, Foreign Lands, 2003)
- Loop Studies One (CD-R, Laub Records, 2003)
- Loop Studies Remixed (CD-R, Arcolepsy Records, 2003)
- Métamorphose (En Sept Étages) (CD-R, S'agita Recordings, 2003)
- Terza Rima (CD-R, Public Eyesore, 2003)
- Threnody One: Lamentation (CD-R, Nulll, 2003)
- An Intricate Course of Deception (CD, .Angle.Rec., 2004)
- Antithesis (CD-R, petite sono], 2004)
- At the Base of the Mind Is Coiled a Serpent (CD, Le Cri de la Harpe, 2004)
- Blauserk (CD-R, The Locus of Assemblage, 2004)
- Butterfly Bones (CD, Between Existence Productions, 2004)
- Field of Drones (CD-R, Arcolepsy Records, 2004)
- Ice Against My Skin (CD-R, Arrêt Arrêt Recordings, 2004)
- Ichneumon (MP3, TIBProd, 2004)
- Same River Twice (7", Drone Records, 2004)
- Scouring Thin Bones (MP3, Noiseusse, 2004)
- Tense Surfaces (MP3, Panospria, 2004)
- The Taste of Summer on Your Skin (CD-R, taâlem, 2004)
- 24.2.24.4. (MP3, Dark Winter, 2005)
- At Home With… (CD, Infraction, 2005)
- Candescence (CD-R, Verato Project, 2005)
- Figures (CD-R, Transient Frequency, 2005)
  - Re-released (CD, Volubilis Records, 2007)
- Periodic (CD-R, Crucial Bliss, 2005)
- Remixes (CD-R, Arcolepsy Records, 2005)
- Skein of Veins (MP3, Phoniq, 2005)
- Songs of Flowers & Skin (CD-R, Zunior Records, 2005)
  - Re-released (CD, Beta-lactam Ring Records, 2010)
- Still My Beating Heart Beats (CD-R, Pertin_nce, 2005)
- The Taste of Summer on Your Skin (CD-R, taâlem, 2004/2005)
  - 1st & 2nd editions released in 2004 & 2005 respectively
- Traumerei (CD-R, Evelyn Records, 2005)
- Undercurrents (CD/MP3, Zenapolae (free download), 2005)
- Within the Final Circle (MP3, Mirakelmusik, 2005)
- 030706 (MP3, City of Glass, 2006)
- Dog Fox Gone to Ground (CD-R, Afe Records, 2006)
- Oneiromancer (CD, 2xCD, Die Stadt, 2006)
  - 2CD version contains a second disc with an Untitled Live Performance
- Peau Sensible (MP3, Zenapolæ (free download), 2006)
- Pendulum (CD-R, Gears of Sand, 2006)
- Still My Beating Heart Beats (MP3, Pertin_nce, 2006)
- The Sea Swells a Bit… (CD, A Silent Place, 2006)
- Broken & Remade (CD, Volubilis Records, 2007)
- Concretion (MP3, .Angle.Rec., 2007)
- Convs. w/ Myself (CD-R, Evelyn Records, 2007)
- Dance of Lonely Molecules (CD-R, Blade Records, 2007)
- Exoskeleton Heart (CD-R, Crucial Bliss, 2007)
- Figures (CD, Volubilis Records, 2007)
- Green & Cold (CD-R, Gears of Sand, 2007)
  - Re-released (CD, Beta-lactam Ring Records, 2008)
- I Will Always and Forever Hold You in My Heart and Mind (CD-R, Small Doses, 2007)
  - Limited 2nd Edition was released in 2008 with slightly different artwork
  - Re-released (CD, Basses Frequences/Small Doses, 2010)
- Noise of Silence (CD-R, Hyperblasted, 2007)
- Scalpel (CD, The Kora Records, 2007)
- Second Week of the Second Month (MP3, Kikapu Net.Label, 2007)
- Thoughtspan (CD-R, Tosom, 2007)
  - Re-released (LP, Blackest Rainbow, 2009)
- Fragile Movements in Slow Motion (CD-R, Universal Tongue, 2008)
- Suchness #1 (CD-R, Gears of Sand, 2008)
- 20080307 (3"CD-R, Walnut + locust, 2009)
- Blue Figures (CD, Basses Frequences, 2009)
- Dry (CD, Install, 2009)
- Gathering Blue (2LP, Equation Records, 2009)
- Live in Montreal (MP3, Blocks Recording Club, 2009)
- PMT#60 Playmytape @ Dom Club (MP3, Play MY Tape, 2009)
- Liminoid | Lifeforms (CD, Alien8 Recordings, 2010)
- Rictus (CD, OHM Records, 2011) – compilation of the 3" CD-R releases Cicatrice (2003), Blauserk (2004), The Taste of Summer on Your Skin (2004) and Fragile Movements in Slow Motion (2008)
- Passing Thru (CD/Book, Beta-lactam Ring Records, forthcoming)
- Only Stories (CD, The Kora Records, forthcoming)
- Lost in the Rat Maze (CD, ConSouling Sounds, 2011)
- Pure Drone (Drone Compendium vol 1) (LP, Beta-Lactam Ring Records, 2011)
- The Spectrum of Distraction (2xCD, Robotic Empire, 2012) – Comes with download card containing over 6 hours of extra material / full mixes.
- Already Drowning (LP, CD, Gizeh Records, 2013)
- Objekts (Cassette, DV, 2016)
- Aberration (CD, Cassette, Digital, Somewherecold Records, 2017)
- Children of the Sun (Original Soundtrack) (2024)

=== Collaborations ===
- Aidan Baker vs. Straiph Wilson– Scouring Thin Bones(3×File, MP3, 192 kbps)

Noiseusse N12.2004

- Approaching a Black Hole with DD3 (CD-R, Fargone Records, 2006)
- An Open Letter to Franz Kafka with Beta Cloud (CD-R, Laughing Bride Media, 2007)
- Nagual with Todd Merrell & Patrick Jordan (CD, aRCHIVE, 2007)
- Orange with thisquietarmy (CD-R, thisquietarmy Records, 2007)
- Live Collaboration with Leah Buckareff & Datashock (12", Meudiademorte/Hlava Temple, 2007)
- Fantasma Parastasie with Tim Hecker (Alien8 Recordings, 2008)
- Live 2008-14-11 with Brandon Valdivia (CD, Universal Tongue, 2009)
- A Picture of a Picture with thisquietarmy (CD, Album, Killer Pimp, 2009)
- White Nights / Drone Fields / DOM with Nadja (2xDVD, 2xCD, Beta-Lactam Ring Records, 2009) – 1 DVD & 1 CD each for Nadja / Aidan Baker solo
- Infinite Light Ltd. with Nathan Amundson of Rivulets and Mat Sweet of Boduf Songs. (CD, LP Denovali Records, 2011)
- Werl with Tomas Järmyr (Consouling Sounds, 2016)
- Noplace with Simon Goff/Thor Harris (CD/LP, Album, Gizeh Records, 2017)
- Invisible Cities with Gareth Davis (LP/CDr, Album, Carlrecords, 2018)

=== Splits ===
- Untitled with Z'EV, John Duncan & Fear Falls Burning (2x7", Die Stadt, 2005)
- Colorful Disturbances with Noveller (LP, Divorce, 2009)
- The Sun is Bleeding & Has Black Hands with ARC (2CD, Kokeshidisk, 2009)

=== With Nadja ===
- Touched (Deserted Factory Records, 2003)
- Skin Turns to Glass (Nothingness Records, 2003)
- Corrasion (Foreshadow Productions, 2003)
- split with Moss (2003)
- I Have Tasted the Fire Inside Your Mouth (Deserted Factory Records, 2004)
- Bodycage (Nothingness Records, 2005)
- Bliss Torn from Emptiness (Fargone Records, 2005)
- Truth Becomes Death (Alien8 Recordings, 2005)
- Absorption Split with Methadrone (2005)
- Trembled (Profound Lore Recordings, 2006)
- We Have Departed the Circle Blissfully with Fear Falls Burning (Conspiracy Records, 2006)
- Thaumogenesis (Archive Records, 2007)
- Guilted by the Sun (Roadburn Records, 2007)
- Radiance of Shadows (Alien8 Recordings, 2007)
- 12012291920/1414101 with Atavist (Invada Records, 2007)
- Nadja with Fear Falls Burning (Conspiracy Records, 2007)
- Desire in Uneasiness (Crucial Blast Records, 2008)
- Long Dark Twenties 7" (Anthem Records, 2008)
- Trinity (Die Stadt Musik, 2008)
- The Bungled & the Botched (ConSouling Sounds, 2008)
- Autopergamene (Essence Music, 2010)
- Cystema Solari with Uochi Toki (CORPOC, 2014)

=== With ARC ===
- Untitled (CD-R, Arcolepsy Records, 2000)
- Two (CD-R, Arcolepsy Records/Mathbat Records, 2001)
- 13th (CD-R, taâlem, 2002
- 2 Songs (MP3, Subverseco, 2002)
- Repercussion (CD-R, Piehead Records, 2002)
- Feral (CD-R, Arcolepsy Records/Worthy Records, 2003)
- Eyes in the Back of Our Heads (CD-R, Worthy Records, 2004)
- The Circle Is Not Round (CD, A Silent Place, 2005)
- Periodical II (CD-R, The Ceiling, 2006)

=== Tracks Appear On ===
- My Own Wolf: A New Approach [Track titled 'Eitttlane'](a tribute to Ulver, MP3, CD-R, Aspherical Asphyxia Prod., 2007)
- Resistance Compilation II: In Support of the ACLU (Somewherecold Records, 2020)

=== With Mnemosyne ===
- Spiritsized (CD-R, Arcolepsy Records, 2003)
- The Air Grows Small Fingers (CD-R, Piehead Records, 2004)

== Bibliography ==
- Fingerspelling (Penumbra Press)
- Wound Culture (Unbound Books)
- The Adventures of Me & You (Eraserhead Press)
- Place Name (Wingate Press)
- Passing Through (Wounded Wolf Press, forthcoming)
