= Andrew Barr (musician) =

American drummer

Andrew Gilmore Barr is a drummer, composer, and producer based in Montreal, Quebec, Canada who is best known for his work with The Barr Brothers and The Slip. Barr is also the regular touring drummer with Feist and Mumford and Sons.

Barr is a founding member of the experimental rock band the Slip (1995–2007) and indie folk group the Barr Brothers along with his brother Brad Barr. Born in Providence, Rhode Island, Andrew began playing the drums at an early age, a student of jazz drummer Bob Gullotti and drummer/percussionist Jamey Haddad (Paul Simon), Andrew studied in Boston at Berklee College of Music before spending time in Mali, West Africa studying with master drummer Abdoul Doumbia.

As well as being a fixture in the Barr Brothers, he has performed with several artists and appeared on an array of albums. He has performed and/or recorded with Leslie Feist, Mumford and Sons, Gracie Abrams, Aaron Dessner, Florence and the Machine, Kevin Morby, Laufey, Juana Molina, Broken Social Scene, M. Ward, Lhasa de Sela, Alexi Murdoch, Natalie Merchant, David Binney, Bassekou Kouyate, Ua, Marco Benevento, Patrick Watson, Land of Talk, Nathan Moore, Esmerine, Sonya Kitchell, Richard Reed Parry, The Low Anthem, Greg Saunier, Bryce Dessner, Bonny Light Horseman, Fred Fortin, and Little Scream among others.

The Barr Brothers have recorded four full-length albums and an EP; have appeared twice on The Late Show with David Letterman; been regular guests on BBC, CBC, NPR; have toured the world regularly; and have been nominated for three Juno awards.

== Partial Discography ==
with The Barr Brothers

- The Barr Brothers – The Barr Brothers - 2010
- Sleeping Operator – The Barr Brothers - 2014
- Alta Falls EP – The Barr Brothers - 2016
- Queens Of The Breakers – The Barr Brothers - 2017
- Let It Hiss – The Barr Brothers - 2025

Featured on other albums

- From the Gecko – The Slip - 1997
- Does – The Slip - 2000
- Angels Come on Time – The Slip - 2002
- Aliveacoustic – The Slip - 2003
- Alivelectric – The Slip - 2003
- Eisenhower – The Slip - 2006
- Invisible Baby – Marco Benevento - 2008
- Some Are Lakes – Land Of Talk - 2008
- This Storm – Sonya Kitchell - 2008
- Fun and Laughter – Land Of Talk - 2009
- Me Not Me – Marco Benevento - 2009
- Lhasa – Lhasa DeSela– 2009
- Cloak and Cipher – Land Of Talk - 2010
- Between the Needles and Nightfall – Marco Benevento - 2010
- La Lechuza – Esmerine - 2011
- TigerFace – Marco Benevento - 2011
- Jama Ko – Bassekou Kouyate - 2013
- Arc Iris – Arc Iris - 2014
- Natalie Merchant - 2014
- Ultramarr – Fred Fortin - 2016
- Cult Following – Little Scream - 2016
- The Story Of Fred Short – Marco Benevento - 2018
- Quiet River of Dust Vol. 1 – Richard Reed Parry - 2018
- Bonnie Light Horseman – Bonnie Light Horseman - 2020
- Migration Stories – M. Ward - 2020
- The Secret Of Us – Gracie Abrams - 2024
- Everybody Scream – Florence And The Machine - 2025
- Doga – Juana Molina - 2025
- A Matter Of Time – Laufey - 2025
- Prizefighter – Mumford & Sons - 2026
- Little Wide Open – Kevin Morby - 2026
