= Brad Barr =

American-Canadian singer-songwriter

Philip Bradford "Brad" Barr
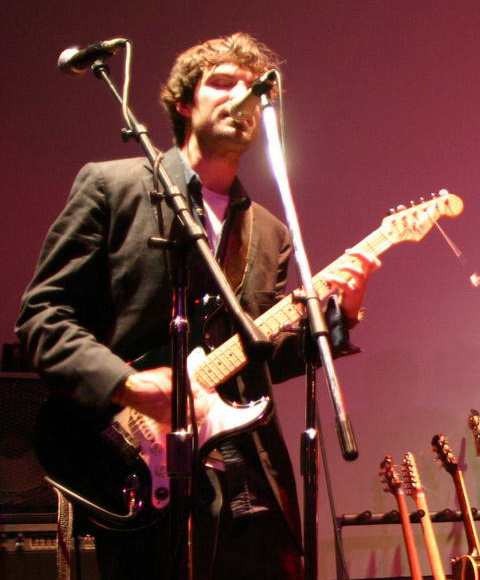
- Brad Barr performing with The Slip in 2005

Background information
- Also known as: Brad Barr
- Born: Philip Bradford Barr; July 27, 1975 (age 50); Providence, Rhode Island, U.S.
- Genres: Avant-garde, indie rock, indie folk, folk rock
- Occupations: Musician, singer, songwriter, guitarist
- Instruments: Guitar, piano, harmonica, harpsichord, banjo
- Years active: 1996–present
- Labels: KA, Flying Frog, Rykodisc, 216, Bar/None, Tompkins Square, Secret City Records
- Member of: The Slip, The Barr Brothers
- Formerly of: Surprise Me Mr. Davis, Sonya Kitchell, Super Little

Philip Bradford "Brad" Barr (born July 27, 1975), better known by "Brad Barr," is an American-Canadian guitarist and singer-songwriter, best known for his work with The Slip, The Barr Brothers and Surprise Me Mr. Davis.

Born to his mother Nancy Verde Barr, a contemporary author and culinary chef, and his father Philip Duane Barr, a once practicing orthodontist, during the summer of 1975 in Providence, Rhode Island. This would set Barr up for a core memory in his adolescent years, a time in which he'd often wander Rhode Island with his early friends, resulting in an incidental visit to the Newport's "Breakers Mansion." This event lead to the inspiration for the titular track of The Barr Brothers' fourth studio album; Queens of The Breakers.

== Discography ==
September 16, 2008, Barr released his debut solo album consisting entirely of instrumental compositions titled, The Fall Apartment: Instrumental Guitar or "The Fall Apartment" for short. It was released under the Tompkins Square Records label.

The Winter Mission (stylized as THE WINTER MISSION), Barr's second solo album, released on January 21, 2022 amidst the COVID-19 pandemic. The album, with art and design credited to Brigitte Henry, similarly consisted solely of instrumentals. Unlike The Fall Apartment, however, this album was brought to life with a creative push from Michael Wolk who commissioned Barr to create it; Wolk went on to become the executive producer for The Winter Mission album. This, in turn, provided Barr a new range with lesser limitations for finding his acoustic sound, and lead to a more developed and grounded sound overall. The album was released under the Secret City Records label

Brad Barr, only four days after The Winter Mission's release was announced, on January 25, 2022, had posted to The Barr Brothers's official Patreon page providing patrons with two bonus tracks from the album. These two tracks consisted of the titles "SAINT MATTHEW'S PASSION" and "PHANTOPOEIA."

== Collaborations ==
In the year of 2007, Barr collaborated with Jade McNelis on her album All the Fables In 2008, Barr collaborated with Sonya Kitchell on her album This Storm. Later, in 2009, he performed on the Land of Talk album, Fun and Laughter.

In 2021, Barr collaborated with Morcheeba on "Say It's Over", a track on the band's tenth studio album Blackest Blue.
