= Life After You =

Life After You may also refer to:

- "Life After You" (Brie Larson song), 2005 single by Brie Larson
- "Life After You" (Daughtry song), 2009 single by Daughtry

== See also ==
- "Life After Youth", 2017 studio album by Land of Talk
- "Is There Life After Youth?", Canadian talk show television miniseries
