= Taarka =

- Origin: Lyons, Colorado, Portland, Oregon
- Genres: Folk rock, experimental, jazz
- Years active: 2001–present
- Label: Frogville Records
- Members: Enion Pelta–Tiller; David Tiller; Dale Largent; Troy Robey
- Past members: Daniel Plane; Jarrod Kaplan; James Whiton; Damian Erskine; Adam Hill
- Website: www.taarka.com

Taarka is a Lyons, Colorado-based musical group originally formed in Portland, Oregon in 2001 by the husband/wife team of David Tiller (mandolin) and Enion Pelta-Tiller (violin). The group originally included Jarrod Kaplan on percussion and James Whiton on stand-up bass. Since their departure Taarka has primarily consisted of a rotating membership. Recent Taarka contributors often include Dale Largent on percussion, Daniel Plane on cello, and Troy Robey on bass.

== History ==
In 2000, David Tiller's band, ThaMuseMeant, took a hiatus and Tiller moved to New York City, where he met Enion Pelta through a band called Brooklyn Browngrass. Tiller and Pelta started playing and writing together in early 2001, and the couple soon moved to Oregon. In the coming months, Taarka was formed.

In 2002, Taarka: Live In the Studio was recorded and released, and although it is currently out of print, it is still available for digital download on iTunes. In 2003, ThaMuseMeant re-formed with a new member: Enion Pelta–Tiller on violin, David Tiller's new wife. In the same year, the Tillers released an acoustic duo album, Man Chasing Woman around Table. On the Frogville Records website, Man Chasing Woman is listed as being out of print, but "maybe available for download soon."

With 2004 came two new albums, ThaMuseMeant's Silver Seed and Taarka's Even Odd Bird. Even Odd Bird is the oldest album by Taarka that is currently available for sale on their website. After constant touring for several years, Taarka announced in early 2007 that a new album and EP were to be released that year, titled The Trailer and The Martian Picture Soundtrack. Both the EP and the album featured renowned bluegrass fiddler Darol Anger on "The Creepy," a song written by David Tiller, and Joe Craven ("Tutu Tango") and Casey Driessen ("Lonely Woman") were featured on the album.

Beginning on March 18, 2020, Taarka began hosting live social isolation concerts through Facebook due to the outbreak of the Coronavirus.

== Etymology ==
Taarka answered how the name "Taarka" came about on their website.

"We came up with the name on a spring day in 2002, when Enion, who loves to cook, especially indian food, thought of it: the word which describes roasting spices to create the base for an indian culinary delicacy. There are two kinds of t(a)arkas - wet and dry. A wet t(a)arka is a mix of garlic, ginger and onions sauteed in ghee. A dry t(a)arka is a mixture of whole spices, dry-roasted or fried in oil, til the seeds begin to pop."

== Band members ==
- David Tiller - Mandolin, Guitars, Vocals, Bass, Bouzouki
- Enion Pelta–Tiller - Violins, Vocals

== Discography ==
=== Albums ===
Year	Title	Label
2001	Taarka: Live in the Studio	Omnivine Records
2003	Man Chasing Woman Around Table (Tiller and Pelta duo album)	self-released
2004	Even Odd Bird	Omnivine Records
2007	The Trailer	Frogville Records
2007	The Martian Picture Soundtrack	Frogville Records
2008	Seed Gathering (EP)	self-released
2009	Seed Gathering For A Winter Garden	self-released
2012	Adventures in Vagabondia	self-released
2015	Making Tracks Home	self-released
2017	Fading Mystery	self-released
