= Indistinct Conversations =

Studio album by Land of Talk
- Released: July 31, 2020
- Genre: Indie rock
- Length: 37:27
- Label: Dine Alone

Land of Talk chronology
Life After Youth (2017)	Indistinct Conversations (2020)	Calming Night Partner (2021)

Indistinct Conversations is the fourth full-length album by Canadian indie rock band Land of Talk, released on July 31, 2020 through Saddle Creek Records and Dine Alone Records.

The album was planned to be released on May 15, 2020; however, due to COVID-19 the album's release was delayed.

The album was produced in Montreal, Quebec.

== Background ==
Work on Indistinct Conversations began in early 2018, when Elizabeth Powell spent time writing new songs, putting down some demos and acted as a support for a number of bands. During this process on October 3, 2018, a short clip appeared on Land of Talk's social media sites a demo version of a track called "It Ain't Right".

Throughout the recording process Land of Talk performed at a number of events in 2018 including River Fest, @wruwfm's studio-a-rama, HFX Jazz Festival and Troubadour Festival. The band continued to tour alongside The War on Drugs and The Barr Brothers.

In March 2019, Powell appeared on the single "Every Wave to Ever Rise" by American Football. singing backing vocals in both English and French. This was followed with a live show at Brazil's Balaclava Festival in April 2019.

In June 2019, during live performances in Canada, two new tracks were premiered: "Weight of That Weekend", and "Love in 2 Stages", both of which would later appear on the album.

On July 16, 2019, the band confirmed on social media, mixing of the album had been completed with assistance from Liam Ortmeier. By September 16, 2019 the band confirmed new songs were to be released soon.

From November 7 to November 9, 2019, the band continued to play some live shows many of these located across Quebec supporting Patrick Watson. The band made a return to Brazil where they played Cine Joia in São Paulo in Brazil on December 6 and Montreal at La Chapelle Scènes Contemporaines on December 19 along with Brad Barr of The Barr Brothers.

The album's title and release date were confirmed on the band's Instagram page on December 27, 2019. As part of the lead-up to the release, a special Spotify playlist of songs by other artists that inspired the forthcoming album were revealed on January 16, 2020.

In early 2020, Land of Talk supported Wolf Parade on a number of US and Canadian live shows throughout January and February 2020. During these live shows, Powell revealed the fourth studio album would be released May 1 and feature the songs "Footnotes", "Love in Two Stages" and "The Weight of That Weekend".

It was confirmed on February 25, 2020 that the album would be released on May 15, 2020.

A second track from the album titled "Compelled" featured as part of an acoustic live show with Elizabeth Powell on April 14, 2020, broadcast live on Instagram. During this Instagram live show, Powell revealed the album's release would be moved to a late summer 2020 release due to ongoing issues regarding COVID-19. This was also confirmed on the Saddle Creek record label website.

On August 30, 2021 an official video for 'Weight of That Weekend' was released, even though the track was the first to be released from the album in early 2020.

== Formats ==
The album was released on CD, cassette, and on vinyl in standard and limited edition formats. There are four limited-edition vinyls: one released through Saddle Creek Records (a three colour mix of beige, blue and red), two from Dine Alone Records in Canada (Bone White 12" limited to 100 and 12" opaque blue vinyl limited to 650) and another in opaque red vinyl exclusively through Rough Trade Records in Europe.

== Artwork ==
The album's artwork was produced by Catalan artist Regina Gimenez. Her work uses a technique of combing painting to put in thick plates, voluntarily peeling, in various collages of fabrics and paper (often) almost melted in this organic matter.

== Singles ==
The first single release lifted from the album is "Weight of That Weekend", confirmed by the band during their tour in early 2020. It was released on February 25, 2020. A second single from the album titled "Compelled" was released on April 28, 2020. "Diaphanous" is the third single taken from the album, released on May 26, 2020. On June 22, 2020, "Footnotes" was released as the fourth single alongside a music video directed by Lara Kramer.

A fifth single from the album, "Now You Want to Live in the Light", was released on July 15, 2020, along with a music video also directed by Kramer.

== Indistinct Conversations Tour ==
The band confirmed a number of tour dates across Canada and the US in May and June 2020. These shows were postponed due to COVID-19, with an aim to reschedule these dates. However, the band confirmed a live show for September 24, 2020 in Montreal as part of Pop Montreal with limited capacity.

On April 23, 2022 a very limited edition version of the album is being released for Record Store Day through Dine Alone Records. The alternative edition of the album features new artwork by Toronto based artist Bree Rawn.

== Reviews ==
The album received mainly positive reviews with Pitchfork (7.7/10) defining the record as "it’s the most satisfying Land of Talk album yet". Canadian review website Exclaim gave the album an 8/10 stating "some of the album's finest moments are its quietest".

== Track listing ==
All lyrics are written by Elizabeth Powell.

Indistinct Conversations track listing
No.	Title	Length
1.	"Diaphanous"	4:28
2.	"Look to You (Intro)"	1:23
3.	"Look to You"	3:20
4.	"Weight of That Weekend"	3:47
5.	"Love in 2 Stages"	3:17
6.	"Compelled"	3:15
7.	"Footnotes"	3:33
8.	"A/B Futures"	3:40
9.	"Festivals"	3:14
10.	"Now You Want to Live In the Light"	3:20
11.	"Indistinct Conversations"	4:10
Total length:		37:27

== Personnel ==
- Elizabeth Powell – vocals, guitar, keyboards, production, arrangement
- Mark "Bucky" Wheaton – drums, keyboards, production, arrangement and engineering
- Christopher McCarron – bass guitar, production, arrangement and engineering
- Pietro Amato – mixing on tracks 5 and 11
- Jace Lasek – mixing on tracks 1, 2, 3, 4, 7 and 8
- Radwan Ghazi Moumneh – tracks 6, 9 and 10
- Philip Shaw Bova – mastering
- Joe Yarmush
- Liam Ortmeier – assistant engineering
- Simon Trottier – additional bass and guitar
- Erik Hove – saxophone and flute
- Pietro Amato – keyboards and French horn
- Regina Gimenez – cover artwork
- Jadon Ulrich – design
