= Eisenhower (album) =

Studio album by The Slip
- Released: November 7, 2006
- Genre: Indie rock, jazz fusion
- Label: Bar/None
- Producer: Matthew Ellard

The Slip chronology
Live at Lupo's 6/12/04 (2005)	Eisenhower (2006)

Professional ratings
Review scores
Source	Rating
AllMusic	3.5/5 stars
Exclaim!	(unfavorable)
Vanity Fair	(favorable)

Eisenhower is the fourth studio album and eighth album overall by American indie rock band The Slip. It was released November 7, 2006 on Bar/None Records. It was produced by The Slip and Matthew Ellard (who has also produced for Elliott Smith and Billy Bragg and Wilco) and engineered by Drew Malamud (Stars, Metric). It represented a drastic departure for the Boston/Montreal band, going from their previous jazz-fused to sound to a more streamlined, indie rock sound. The album features contributions from Japanese singer Ua, as well as Chris Seligman from the Canadian indie band Stars. The song "Even Rats" was released with SanDisk Sansa e200 series and Sansa Fuze MP3 players, and was featured in the PlayStation 2 video game Guitar Hero. Live versions of "Children of December" and "If One of Us Should Fall" were previously released on Live at Lupo's 6/12/04, and another live version of the latter was on Alivelectric. "Children of December" and "Even Rats" were released for the Rock Band video game series through the Rock Band Network on March 4, 2010.

== Track listing ==
1. "Children of December" – 4:49
2. "Even Rats" – 5:33
3. "If One of Us Should Fall" – 5:26
4. "Airplane/Primitive" – 6:55
5. "Suffocation Keep" – 5:21
6. "First Panda in Space" – 2:20
7. "The Soft Machine" – 4:21
8. "Life in Disguise" – 3:45
9. "Mothwing Bite" – 3:29
10. "The Original Blue Air" – 2:24
11. "Paper Birds" – 8:19

=== Japanese bonus tracks ===
12. "Airplane/Primitive (feat. UA)"
13. "Airplane/Primitive (feat. UA)" *Radio Edit
14. "Lonely Boy"

== Credits ==
=== The Slip ===
- Andrew Barr – drums
- Brad Barr – vocals, guitar
- Marc Friedman – bass

=== Additional musicians ===
- Gabri Athayde – Cello
- Grayson Farmer – Flugelhorn
- Nellie Fleischner – Vocals
- Rosie Kirincic – Vocals
- Chris Seligman – French Horn
- Isaac Taylor – Vocals

=== Technical personnel ===
- Matthew Ellard – Producer, Engineer, Mixing
- John Frattalone – Management
- Drew Malamud – Engineer, Mixing
- Mister Thecake – Design, Layout Design
- Perry Serpa – Publicity
- The Slip – Producers
- Kristen Smith – Assistant
- Matt Tahaney – Assistant
- Andy VanDette – Mastering
