= This Storm =

This Storm may refer to:

- This Storm (album), an album by Sonya Kitchell
- This Storm (novel), a 2019 novel by James Ellroy
