= Strand Ballroom & Theatre =

Music venue in Providence, Rhode Island, United States

Coordinates: 41.823452°N 71.414387°W

- Interactive map of Strand Ballroom & Theatre
- Former names: Strand Theatre (1915-30; 1934-97); Paramount Theatre (1930-34); Strand Building (1997-2003); Lupo's Heartbreak Hotel (2003-17)
- Address: 79-81 Washington St; Providence, RI 02903-1829
- Location: Downcity
- Owner: Strand Realty II LLC
- Capacity: 1,980

Construction
- Opened: June 12, 1915
- Renovated: 1930, 1978, 2017
- Cost: $75,000 ($2.41 million in 2025 dollars)
- Architect: Thomas J. Hill Pierce

Website
- Venue Website

The Strand Ballroom & Theatre (formerly the Paramount Theatre, Strand Theatre, Lupo's Heartbreak Hotel and commonly The Strand) is a live music venue located in downtown Providence, Rhode Island. The theatre opened in 1915 as a vaudeville theatre and later became a cinema and concert venue.

== History ==
=== Strand Theatre ===
Little is published on the history of the theatre. Designed by Thomas J. Hill Pierce, the venue opened in June 1915, located behind the Biltmore Hotel. The Strand was popular for a time as a vaudevillian theatre. In 1929, the theatre changed management and opened a year later as the Paramount Theatre. To capitalize on the emerging "talking pictures" market, the nearly 2,100-seat auditorium was converted into a movie cinema, making it one of eight in downtown Providence. Four years later, the theatre returned to its original name.

Attendance declined in the early 1970s, and the cinema shifted to showing adult films. In 1978, the once-prominent theatre was renovated into a mixed-use commercial space. Aside from a small number of storefronts, the majority of the building remained vacant. In 1993, the auditorium reopened and operated as a live music hall until 1997. After it closed, the city considered turning the building into a parking lot.

=== Lupo's Heartbreak Hotel ===
Lupo's Heartbreak Hotel was the brainchild of Rich Lupo. The Boston native moved to Providence to attend Brown University. Lupo stated that his dream was to own a club where Bo Diddley would play (which came to fruition in 1977). Prior to opening the club, Lupo had worked as a house painter and a bartender. On September 5, 1975, he opened the first incarnation of Lupo's in the former Conrad building. Described as a "concert space that still had the fun of bar", the cozy 300-seat space hosted many prominent bands in the late 70s into the early 80s.

The reputation of Lupo's grew among musicians, although in the late 1970s and early 1980s, the club was better known as a bar than as a concert venue. In 1988, when the owners of the Conrad Building converted the space into condominiums, Lupo's was the first business to close. After a five-year break, Lupo opened a second incarnation of the club in the Peerless building. The new location increased the club's capacity from 300 to over 1,500, giving it more the character of a concert hall than a bar.

In 2003, the owner of the Peerless building announced plans to create residential units in the building's upper stories. Initial negotiations would have limited the concert venue to three performances a week, imposed a strict 10:30 pm curfew, and required a significant reduction in the noise level. When Lupo and property owner Arnold Chace failed to reach an agreement, Lupo considered going to the press but later admitted that that would have been a mistake.

Although the venue brought some 300,000 visitors to the downtown area, Lupo lost his contract with the Peerless building. At the suggestion of mayor David Cicilline, Lupo identified the abandoned Strand Theatre as a possible location for his next concert venue. At the time, the Strand's auditorium could only house 1,200 people, a substantial decrease from Lupo's II. However, the reopening of the balcony would increase that capacity to nearly 1,700.

"Lupo's Last Stand" took place on December 3, 2003, in its Peerless building location. The venue opened in its third location on December 11, 2003. The larger capacity allowed a variety of acts to perform there. Locally referred to as "Lupo's at The Strand" or "Lupo's III", the space was also shared with Roxy, a nightclub with space for 400 people.

In 2016, it was reported that Lupo had sold a majority of his stake in the concert venue. In May 2017, Garry Williams and Frank Manfredi Jr. were announced as the new owners. The theatre closed in June of that year for a three-month, $1 million renovation project. The renovations were designed to provide a more musical ambience to the over 100-year-old building. Upgrades included: a wider stage, updated dressing rooms, sound systems, lights and restrooms. Two mobile LED screens were installed to make the space feel more like a modern concert hall and less like the night club it once had been. The balcony seats were reupholstered, and the bar on the main floor was removed.

The renovated theatre, now known as the Strand Ballroom and Theatre, opened on September 23, 2017.

== Notable performers ==
The following is a list of notable musicians, bands and singers who have performed at the Strand Ballroom & Theatre or Lupo's Heartbreak Hotel.

- The 1975
- A Boogie Wit Da Hoodie
- Accept
- Alkaline Trio
- Ani DiFranco
- The Avett Brothers
- Bad Bunny
- Badfish
- Ben Folds
- Billy Idol
- The Black Crowes
- Blink 182
- Breaking Benjamin
- Buddy Guy
- The Chainsmokers
- Chief Keef
- Children of Bodom
- Coheed and Cambria
- Cold War Kids
- Cole Swindell
- Color Me Badd
- Crowbar
- DMX
- Dark Star Orchestra
- Dave Matthews Band
- David Rawlings
- Derek Trucks Band
- Earl Sweatshirt
- El Alfa
- Elle King
- Elvis Costello
- Explosions In The Sky
- Faith No More
- Fear Factory
- The Flaming Lips
- Flotsam and Jetsam
- Foo Fighters
- The Fray
- Fugazi
- Future
- Galactic
- G-Eazy
- Gillian Welch
- Girl Talk
- Guster
- Gwar
- Interpol
- J. Cole
- Jack's Mannequin
- John Mayer
- John Petrucci
- Juicy J
- Justin Bieber
- Kansas
- Kendrick Lamar
- KK's Priest
- The Kooks
- Korn
- KRS-One
- Less Than Jake
- Lil Yachty
- Limp Bizkit
- Mac Miller
- Marilyn Manson
- Maroon 5
- The Mars Volta
- Mastodon
- Matisyahu
- Megadeth
- Meek Mill
- Method Man
- The Mighty Mighty Bosstones
- Modest Mouse
- Moris Tepper
- My Chemical Romance
- Nate Ruess
- New Politics
- Oasis
- Panic! at the Disco
- Pantera
- Pavement
- Playboi Carti
- Queens Of The Stone Age
- Radiohead
- Rakim
- The Ramones
- The Receiving End of Sirens
- Redman
- Reel Big Fish
- Rihanna
- Rilo Kiley
- Rusted Root
- Seether
- Sevendust
- She Wants Revenge
- Shinedown
- Slash
- Slayer
- Sleater-Kinney
- The Slip
- Sloan
- The Smashing Pumpkins
- Snoop Dogg
- Something Corporate
- Sonic Youth
- Soulfly
- The Starting Line
- Static-X
- Steve Hackett
- Steve Vai
- The Strokes
- They Might Be Giants
- Third Eye Blind
- Thirty Seconds to Mars
- Tove Lo
- Trapt
- TV On the Radio
- Tyler, the Creator
- Tyga
- The Used
- Wale
- Walk the Moon
- Weezer
- The White Stripes
- Wilco
- Wolf Parade
- Wu-Tang Clan
- Zakk Wylde
- The Young Adults
