= Live at Lupo's 6/12/04 =

Live album by The Slip
- Released: January 4, 2005
- Recorded: June 12, 2004
- Genre: Indie rock, jazz fusion
- Label: Kufala

The Slip chronology
Alivelectric (2003)	Live at Lupo's 6/12/04 (2005)	Eisenhower (2006)

Professional ratings
Review scores
Source	Rating
Allmusic	4/5 stars

Live at Lupo's 6/12/04 is a double-live album released January 4, 2005 by Boston trio The Slip on Kufala Recordings. It was recorded June 12, 2004 at Lupo's Heartbreak Hotel in Providence, Rhode Island. "The Air, the Body" features Peter Barr playing steelpan.

== Track listing ==
=== Disc one ===
1. "Old George" – 5:15
2. "More Intense Surveillance" – 11:54
3. "Fear of Falling" – 7:49
4. "Nellie Jean" – 20:03
5. "The Air, the Body" – 13:30

=== Disc two ===
1. "If One of Us Should Fall" – 11:45
2. "Children of December" – 11:38
3. "Ho Syne No Day/The Bongo Dance" – 10:40
4. "Seranetta" – 6:02
5. "Chasing Rabbits" – 8:02
6. "Proud" – 10:51
7. "Get Me with Fuji" – 13:02
8. "Imagine" – 6:33
