= Cold Day =

Cold Day may refer to:

- Cold Days, a novel
- Cold Day (EP), by Sonya Kitchell
- "Cold Day", a song by The Flaming Lips from The Day They Shot a Hole in the Jesus Egg
- "Cold Day", a song by Black Prairie from Fortune, 2014

== See also ==
- "A Cold Day", an episode of Pigeon Street
