= Does =

Does may refer to:

- A form of the English verb do
- Deer, a ruminant mammal belonging to the family Cervidae
- plural of John Doe, a number of unnamed individuals
- Does (album), an album by rock/jazz band The Slip
- Does (band), a Japanese rock band
