= McNelis =

McNelis is an Irish surname. It may refer to:

- Jade McNelis (born 1986), American singer-songwriter
- Níall McNelis, Irish politician, former mayor of Galway
