= Marc Friedman =

- Friedman performing with The Slip at Mr. Small's Theatre in Millvale, Pennsylvania on March 7, 2006

Background information
- Born: June 18, 1977 (age 47)
- Origin: Ohio, United States
- Genres: Jazz rock Indie rock
- Instrument: Bass guitar
- Years active: 1996–present
- Labels: KA; Flying Frog; Rykodisc; 216; Bar/None
- Website: www.theslip.com

Marc Friedman (born June 18, 1977 in Ohio) is an American electric bassist/multi-instrumentalist and composer. Marc tours internationally and has recorded seven full-length albums with Boston-based avante-rock power trio The Slip. Marc is a co-arranger/producer/writer of the band's material along with the other two members, Brad and Andrew Barr. His bass playing with The Slip (formed ca. 1995) has been regarded by most as widely influential and purely creative. Technical prowess with mature restraint and acute improvisational skills are part of Marc's best known musical traits.

Marc was introduced to playing music when he was seven years old through classical piano lessons. An interest in rock music lead him to pick up guitar and bass in his teenage years. Marc is a graduate of Tabor Academy in Marion, Massachusetts, and he attended Berklee College of Music for two semesters in 1995/96. In and around Boston, Marc has taught private lessons to aspiring bass players and improvisors for many years. Teaching is a fortifying outlet for Marc's inventive approaches to modern electric bass playing and improvising.
