= Land of Talk =

Canadian band

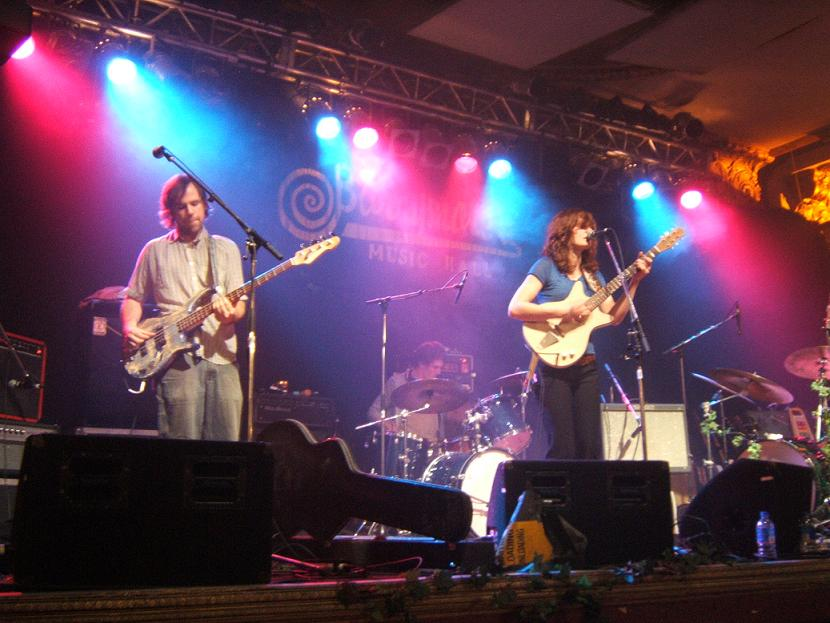
- Land of Talk performing at Barrymore's in Ottawa, Ontario, Canada, 2006

Background information
- Also known as: landoftalk.net
- Origin: Montreal, Quebec, Canada
- Genre: Indie rock
- Years active: 2006–2011, 2015–present
- Labels: Dependent, One Little Indian, Saddle Creek, Secret City
- Members: Elizabeth Powell; Joe Yarmush; Andrew Barr; Mark "Bucky" Wheaton; Chris McCarron
- Past members: Eric Thibodeau; Timothy Kramer
- Website: www.landoftalkmusic.com

Land of Talk is a Canadian indie rock band, formed in 2006, from Montreal, Quebec. The band is led by singer and guitarist Elizabeth Powell.

Land of Talk's style has been compared to the Yeah Yeah Yeahs. Powell's vocal performances incorporate the vibrato technique. Their lyrics are considered to be confessional and confrontational in nature by AllMusic, and explore topics such as social roles and mortality salience.

== History ==
Before becoming the front-person for Land of Talk, Elizabeth Powell began their career as a solo artist performing under the name ELE_K*. Their debut album was released in 2003 through independent Canadian label Sinistre Sound. Powell began writing music at the age of fourteen while they grew up in Guelph, Ontario, Canada. They enrolled in the jazz program at Concordia University where they met Chris McCarron and Mark Wheaton with whom they formed Land of Talk. Eric Thibodeau replaced Wheaton on drums in May 2007 to complete a new lineup.

"Some bands have a bit more of a meteoric rise, and some are slow burners. I like to think we're a slow burner," Powell says. "It's totally true to who I am and how I approach my own life. Very slow and very unsure, but curious. And it all works out."

Land of Talk has received funding from agencies such as the Canada Council Funding for the Arts (FACTOR).

=== Applause Cheer Boo Hiss ===
The band released its first EP, Applause Cheer Boo Hiss, on April 4, 2006, on Dependent Music. The single "Summer Special" deals with the damaging nature of intra-female conflict and the sadness of losing oneself by way of buying into the damaging stereotypes of femininity. Powell commented in an interview about what inspired them to write "Summer Special" and how it compared to their life growing up as a tomboy.

Another stand-out track from the EP is "Speak to Me Bones", which also deals with the theme of relational conflict. This track exemplifies their use of soft vocals and gritty rock sounding musical arrangements. The music video for "Speak to Me Bones" was directed by a former Concordia school mate, Jeffrey St. Jules. The concept of the video was kept simple, shot in black and white staying true to the band's no-frills style.

=== Some Are Lakes ===
Land of Talk released their first full-length album, Some Are Lakes, on Secret City Records in Canada and Saddle Creek Records in the US. The album was released on October 7, 2008, and was produced by Justin Vernon of Bon Iver. Drums on the album are played by Andrew Barr of The Slip. Powell announced during a performance that the band would be taking a break after its tour with Broken Social Scene. The band did not in fact go on hiatus, but instead McCarron left (amicably) to play guitar for The Dears. He was replaced by Joe Yarmush, and the band announced a West Coast tour for 2009.

=== Fun and Laughter EP ===
Land of Talk released the EP Fun and Laughter on October 27, 2009, on Saddle Creek. Via Saddle Creek: "Land of Talk have announced a west coast tour beginning October 27th in San Diego, and running through November 7th in Vancouver B.C. To complement the tour, the band will be releasing an EP with four new songs and three videos, entitled 'Fun and Laughter'."

=== Cloak and Cipher ===
Early in 2009, Powell had to cancel the band's tour to recover from a hemorrhage vocal polyp. Powell used their six-month recuperation period to write and record the next album, titled Cloak and Cipher. It was released on August 24, 2010, on Saddle Creek Records. It has contributions from Patrick Watson, as well as members of Stars, Arcade Fire, Thee Silver Mt. Zion, Wintersleep, Besnard Lakes, and Esmerine. Cloak and Cipher appeared on the !earshot National Top 50 Chart that fall.

In 2011, Powell posted on Land of Talk's official Facebook page to sell one of their guitar amps. The Land of Talk Facebook page stopped updating, and management eventually confirmed a hiatus.

=== 2015–2017: Revival, Life After Youth ===
On April 25, 2015, Powell played their first show since 2011 at the Roots North Music Festival in Orillia, Ontario. On December 5, the band social media pages were updated for the first time in 4 years, with a photo of Powell showing the peace sign. They also posted another image thanking everyone for their support and confirmed that Land of Talk had returned. A brief preview of an upcoming track was released on December 12, although no release date was specified. An image posted on December 16, had the words, "I'm just gonna focus on the music" and 'kickstarter coming soon'.

The band played various shows in 2016 including NXNE on June 18. On February 28, 2017, Land of Talk confirmed the planned release of a new album, Life After Youth, for May 19, 2017, sharing new track "Inner Lover" at the same time.

=== 2018–2019: touring, recording Indistinct Conversations ===
Powell spent most of early 2018 writing new songs, focusing on demos and supporting other bands. A short clip demo version of "It Ain’t Right" was revealed on social media on October 3, 2018.

Throughout the recording process Land of Talk performed at a number of events in 2018 including River Fest, wruwfm's studio-a-rama, HFX Jazz Festival and Troubadour Festival. They also toured with a number of bands including The War on Drugs and The Barr Brothers.

In February 2019, Powell appeared on the single "Every Wave To Ever Rise" by American Football. singing backing vocals in both English and French. This was followed with a live show at Brazil's Balaclava Festival in April 2019.

In June 2019, during live performances in Canada, two new tracks were premiered: "Weight of that Weekend" and "Love in Two Stages", both expected to appear on a new album. On July 16, 2019 the band confirmed through social media that mixing the new album had begun with the help of Liam Ortmeier.

From November 7–9, 2019 the band played three gigs across Quebec supporting Patrick Watson. They played Cine Joia in São Paulo in Brazil on December 6 and in Montreal, Quebec at La Chapelle Scènes Contemporaines on December 19 with Brad Barr of The Barr Brothers.

Land of Talk confirmed they would act as a support to Wolf Parade on a few of their North American tour dates in January and February 2020.

On December 27, 2019, through the band's Instagram page, it was confirmed a new album would be released in spring 2020, titled Indistinct Conversations. As part of the lead-up to the release, a special Spotify playlist of songs by other artists that inspired the forthcoming album was revealed on January 16, 2020. It was confirmed on February 25, 2020, the album was slated for release on May 15, 2020, but it was eventually delayed until July 31.

=== 2020–present: Belle Époque, Calming Night Partner EP and album ===
Prior to the launch of 'Indistinct Conversations,' for one day only in March 2020, Elizabeth Powell issued their 1999 cassette Belle Époque as a download through Bandcamp. This was part of Bandcamp's Friday music campaign, with all sales going directly to the artist. However, the download was officially released to a wider fanbase on February 5, 2021.

On October 13, 2020, through the band's Instagram story, the band confirmed they were working on a new album and EP, with the possibility of releasing the EP in late 2021. Artwork for the new EP was revealed on the band's Instagram on April 14, 2021. On June 6, 2021, the band confirmed through their Instagram account with a message "New EP Coming Soon" with the words "Stay Up All Night Wondering How To Make Things Right". On July 26, 2021, the band confirmed through an Instagram story a new EP would be released in October with a new song to be released "soon", followed by a 15-second clip of a new song titled "Calming Night Partner".

On September 2, 2021, through the band's social media channels titles of new songs in development were revealed including "Calming Night Partner", "Dogfight", "Something Will Be Said", "Fluorescent Blood", "Make It Out", "Love Will", "Liminal Glide", and "It Didn't Come Easy", some of which will appear on the EP and their next studio album.

On September 22, 2021, the band revealed the name of the new EP - Calming Night Partner through an Instagram story. On October 2, 2021, Land of Talk revealed the title of the first track to be lifted from the EP - "Moment Feed" with confirmation a music video directed by aitso would be released. On October 12, 2021, the lead track from their forthcoming EP was released, the EP is to be released on November 12, 2021 as a digital only release. Other tracks to feature on the EP include "Calming Night Partner", "Leave Life Alone", and "Something Will Be Said". The band toured Canada and the US in spring 2022 and began working on new demos in June 2022. According to the band's social media platforms, recording for the new album commenced in July 2022 and continued throughout the first quarter of 2023. In August, the album's title was announced as Performances, with release scheduled for October 13. The album's release was preceded by the singles "Your Beautiful Self", "Pwintiques", and "Sitcom".

== Personal life ==
Elizabeth is non-binary and uses they/them pronouns.

== Discography ==
=== Studio albums ===
- Some Are Lakes (2008)
- Cloak and Cipher (2010)
- Life After Youth (2017)
- Indistinct Conversations (2020)
- Performances (2023)
- LASTS (2026)

=== EPs ===
- Applause Cheer Boo Hiss (2006)
- L'aventure Acoustique (2008)
- Fun and Laughter (2009)
- Calming Night Partner (2021)

=== Singles ===
- "Speak to Me Bones" (2007)
- "Some Are Lakes" (2008)
- "The Man Who Breaks Things" (2008)
- "Young Bridge" – 7" Vinyl Single (2008)
- "Speak to Me Bones" – 7" Vinyl Single (2008)
- "This Time" (2017)
- "Loving" (2017)
- "Weight of that Weekend" (2020)
- "Compelled" (2020)
- "Diaphanous" (2020)
- "Footnotes" (2020)
- "Now You Want to Live in the Light" (2020)
- ”Moment Feed” (2021)

== See also ==
- Music of Quebec
