= Tabor Academy (Massachusetts) =

Prep school in Marion, Massachusetts, US

Coordinates: 41.70792°N 70.76665°W

- Marion, Massachusetts; United States

Information
- Type: Private, boarding
- Motto: All-A-Taut-O
- Established: 1876
- Headmaster: Anthony "Tony" Jaccaci
- Faculty: 86
- Enrollment: 510
- Average class size: 12 students
- Student to teacher ratio: 5:1
- Campus type: Suburban
- Colors: Tabor Red and Midnight Blue
- Athletics: 23 interscholastic, 15 instructional & club
- Athletics conference: Independent School League
- Mascot: Seawolves
- Website: TaborAcademy.org

Tabor Academy is an independent preparatory school located in Marion, Massachusetts, United States. Tabor is known for its marine science courses. Tabor's location on Sippican Harbor, Buzzards Bay, has earned it the name of "The School by the Sea" and the school continues to operate a 115-foot sail training vessel, the SSV Tabor Boy, as a hallmark program of the school. Tabor participates in the Independent School League (ISL) and is a member of the New England Preparatory School Athletic Council.

== History ==
=== Taber's vision ===
Tabor Academy was founded in 1876 as a school for children from Marion, Massachusetts, by a bequest in the will of Elizabeth Sprague (Pitcher) Taber, a wealthy widow and benefactress of the town. Article 27 of her will stated, "I have lately caused to be erected on a lot owned by me in Marion Lower Village, a building ... to be known as 'The Tabor Academy'." It is rumored that she named the school after Mount Tabor, a mountain of biblical importance near the Sea of Galilee. From its creation, the academy was co-educational just as Mrs. Taber had intended, established "to provide better and more complete facilities than had heretofore existed or were likely to exist for thorough education in the higher branches of English knowledge".

The first headmaster was Clark Phelps Howland of Yale University, who reported in 1884 that "It is the aim of the school to give thorough instruction, and to encourage in its pupils a desire for the real rather than the showy, and to develop the moral as well as the intellectual element." The initial tuition fee for the Academy was $24, or $300 for students who wished to board in the headmaster's home. While Elizabeth Taber did not stipulate any particular religious affiliation for the academy, Howland claimed that Tabor "will probably always be under the management of those who sympathize with the Congregational faith." Howland was succeeded by Dana Marsh Dustan, Dartmouth B.A. 1880, A.M. 1883 (1893–1901), Nathan Chipman Hamblin, Harvard B.A. 1892 (1901–1910) and Charles Edward Pethybridge, Amherst B.A. 1906 (1910–1916).

=== Lillard years ===
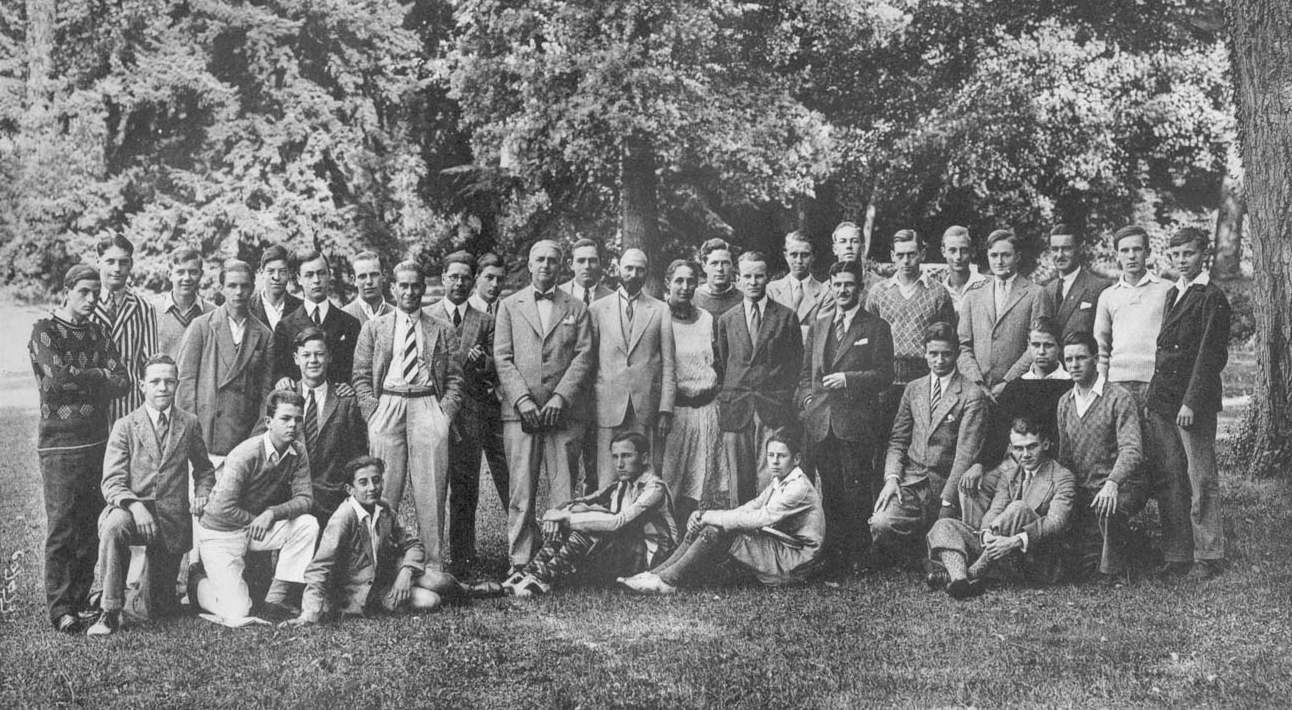
The schoolboys and headmasters of the International Schoolboy Fellowship outside the École du Montcel in summer 1928. Walter H. Lillard is pictured center

Tabor was reorganized in 1916 as an independent secondary school for boys under the tenure of headmaster Walter Huston Lillard, who came to Tabor from Phillips Academy and was educated himself at Dartmouth College and Oxford University, is responsible for creating the first long-range vision for the future of the Academy: one that excluded girls.

Lillard turned Tabor into an all-boys' school and cancelled plans to make the Academy the town of Marion's school and vowed to keep it a privately endowed and operated institution. In the 1930s, Lillard orchestrated a trade with the town of Marion. The original Academy buildings were deeded to the town (now the Elizabeth Taber Library and Marion Town Hall) and were traded for the current waterfront location in order to allow the academy to expand and grow. He acquired the surrounding cottages and plots of land in order to secure the academy's future expansion' the area had increased ten-fold by the end of his tenure in 1942. Among other contributions to the school was his design of the current seal of the school, which shows a full-rigged ship and the motto "All-a-taut-o". He selected the seal as an image to students to "sail towards broader horizons" and the motto because of its nautical meaning as the state of a vessel when everything is shipshape and accounted for.

Lillard was responsible for the creation of the International Schoolboy Fellowship in 1927, the first established international student exchange program for American schoolboys. He was chairman of the program which he formed in conjunction with headmasters from schools in England, France and Germany and eventually invited fifteen other New England prep schools to join as well. He took all boys who "made good" during the academic year on the annual cruise to France to partake in the exchange and brought English schoolboys to study at the Academy during the year. Lillard believed that "One American boy in a French community for a summer brings home a new understanding of French tradition and ideals, which he communicates to his schoolfellows. Friendship and tolerance are bred by intimacy, we cannot begin too young." After his years at Tabor, Walter "Cappy" Lillard went on to work for the United Nations in Vienna as the Chief of the Resettlement Division of the International Refugee Organization.

=== Recent years ===
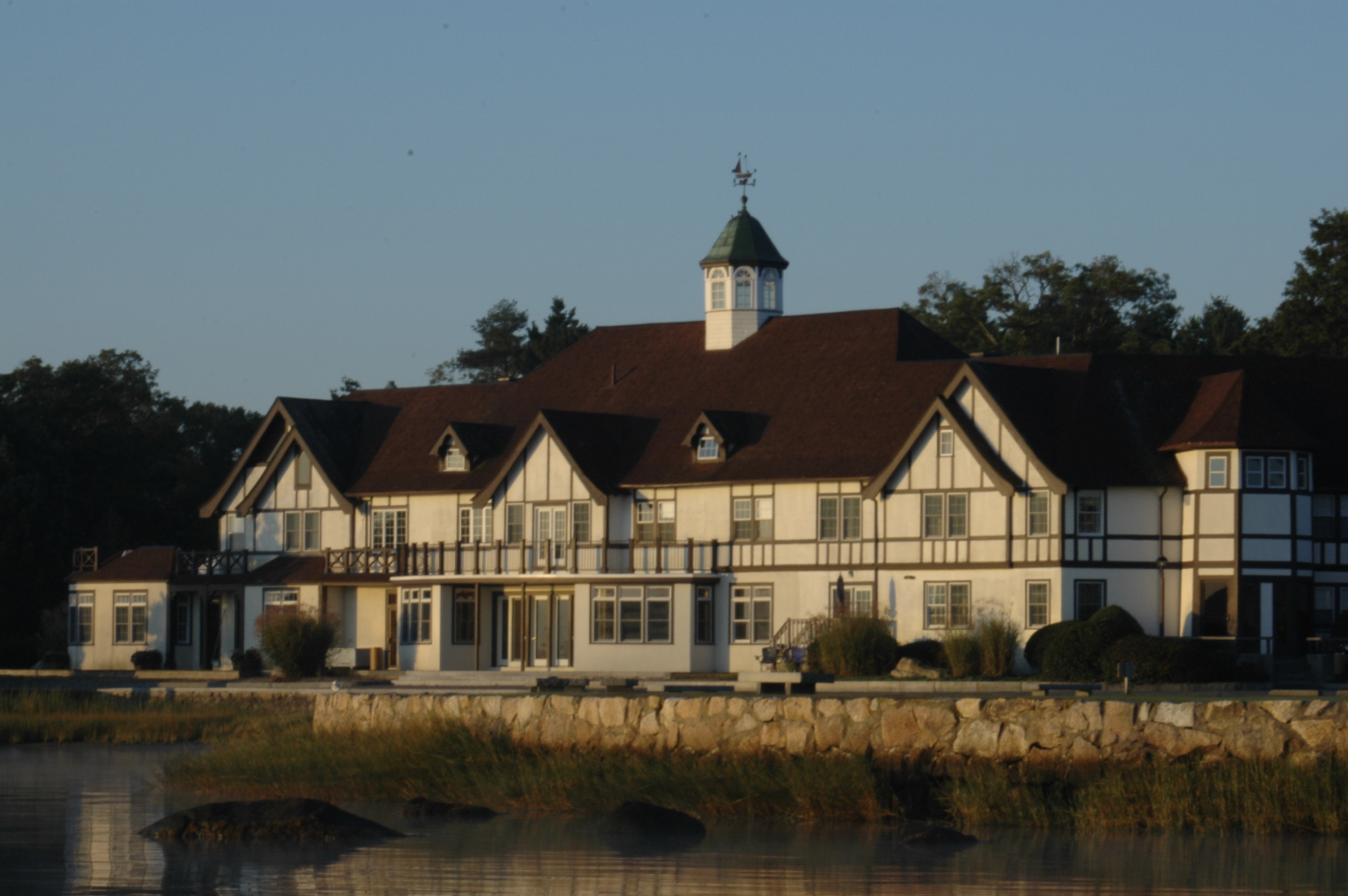
Lillard Hall dormitory

The school was, until the late 1940s, a maritime school where uniformed boys performed morning and evening drill as well as pursuing a classical academic curriculum. When it returned to its original ideals as a rigorous, college preparatory boarding and day school, it still retained its status as a Naval Honor School. It was designated a Naval Honor School in 1941 by Secretary of the Navy Frank Knox, and remains only one of two secondary schools which still hold the distinction.

The headmasters who followed Lillard and continued his vision of expansion and growth were James W. Wickenden (1942–1976), Peter M. Webster B.A. Texas M.A.T. Yale (1976–1989) and Jay S. Stroud B.A. Carleton College, M.A. Dartmouth College, Ed.M Columbia University (1989–2012). In 2002, Stroud commented on the experience of living and learning at Tabor, "Our unparalleled location on the edge of the sea creates our metaphor for education. While some of our students literally study marine biology or celestial navigation, sail boats both large and small, row crew shells or swim off Tabor's docks, all our students undertake voyages of the mind and spirit. Tabor reminds us all that daily life is about the largest visions possible. It is about widening the horizon, redefining the possible, developing the courage to undertake great voyages. All of us who live here are fortunate to have both the joy and the possibility of adventure in the tides that rise at our front door every morning. It is the right place for a school." Stroud retired after the class of 2012. John Quirk was selected by the Board of Trustees to be the headmaster following Stroud's retirement. After a drunk driving incident in early 2020, Quirk was placed on leave until the school selected Julie Salit as interim head of school.

In December 2020, Anthony Jaccaci was announced as the new head of school. 2023 saw the opening of a new campus center and library dedicated to Travis Roy, as well as an additional logo. The legacy seal that includes a square-rigged ship symbolic of the school's rich nautical history remains in use.

== Athletics ==
Tabor Academy fields 55 different teams in 23 interscholastic sports and another 15 instructional programs. The school has the Fish health and athletic center, which includes an indoor hockey rink, fitness center, weight room, wrestling room, eight squash courts, field house, basketball gymnasium, football field, four basketball courts, student lounge and grill, athletic offices, a resident athletic trainer, locker rooms, team rooms and an attached health center and infirmary. Tabor also has the waterfront on Sippican Harbor in Marion for swimming in the spring and summer months, and is used for the training of the sailing and rowing teams.

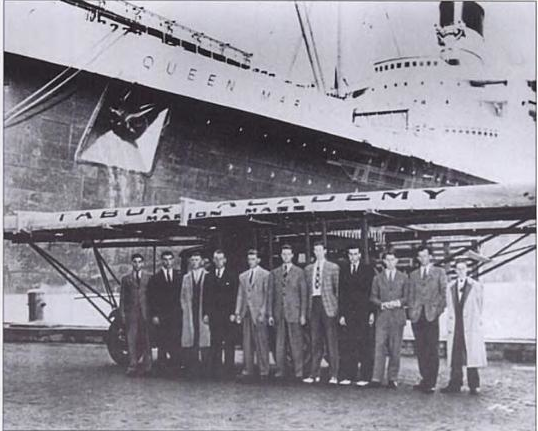
The 1939 Tabor Academy crew prepare to board the Queen Mary to travel to England to win their third championship in the Henley Royal Regatta in the span of four years

=== Rowing ===
In 1919, Tabor was one of the first American prep schools to formally establish a rowing program. The strong rowing history at Tabor dates back almost a century. Both the men's and the women's teams have been active participants in the Henley Royal Regatta in Henley-on-Thames, UK. The men won the Princess Elizabeth Challenge Cup in 1965, the Thames Challenge Cup in 1936, 1937 and 1939 and have made it to the finals in both numerous times. In 1939, the New York Times reported on Tabor's dominance on the international level, stating that "It is almost a maxim nowadays that either Tabor Academy or Kent School will win the Thames Challenge Cup race for eight-oared crews." In August 1938, Tabor's status as an international power in schoolboy rowing was confirmed by its participation in one of the first recorded international schoolboy competitions on American waters when a crew of Radley College oarsmen traveled across the Atlantic via the Cunard Line RMS Aquitania to race the Tabor Academy crew on Sippican Harbor in Marion.

Throughout the 1930s and 1940s Tabor competed regionally against rival prep schools, with its strongest rival being Kent School, faced in numerous Henley finals and American championship regattas. During this period, in order to seek out a higher level of competition, Tabor raced against crews from Harvard University, Yale University and M.I.T. The relationship between Tabor and Harvard can be traced back to 1931 when Tabor traveled to England with the Harvard crew to race at Henley and used one of the Crimson's shells in competition.

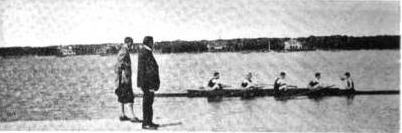
A crew of four Tabor boys rows on Sippican Harbor in 1918.

In 1967, the Tabor oarsmen were poised to win their second Henley victory in three years. Rowing hard races until the finals they faced a well-rested Eton College crew and lost by ¾ of one boat length. Another famous race was the 1947 Thames Challenge Cup final at Henley. Coming after the destruction of World War II, many of the British crews did not have sufficient food after war rationing. Tabor thought the honorable decision was to train under the same caloric restrictions as the British crews. They still managed to reach the finals where they lost to traditional rival Kent School, who brought along their own provisions from the US, but won wide support from the British fans and press for their sportsmanship.

Tabor is one of eleven schools to have a guest room at the famed Leander Club, in Henley-on-Thames. Each room is named after, and designed in the colors of and features various memorabilia from a historically significant rowing school or university. Among the other schools with rooms at Leander are Harvard, Yale, Brown, Oxford, Cambridge and Kent. In recent years, Tabor has continued to win NEIRA championships, win invitations to the USRowing Youth National Championships and travel to England to race at the Henley Royal Regatta on a regular basis.

== Tax Contribution to the Town of Marion ==
Tabor academy does not pay a Payment in lieu of taxes to the Town of Marion.

=== Honours ===
- Henley Royal Regatta, Thames Challenge Cup 1936, 1937, 1939
- Henley Royal Regatta, Princess Elizabeth Challenge Cup 1965

== Tuition ==
Tuition for the 2023–2024 academic year is $74,400 for boarding students, and $56,100 for day students.

2024-2025 Tuition & Financial Aid for Boarding Students is $77,000 and Day Student Tuition is $58,900. International students have additional fees. However, the school awards over $9 million per year in need based financial aid.

== Notable alumni ==
The alumni of Tabor have a far-reaching influence in a number of different fields. Those who have passed through Tabor have gone on to become candidates for the Presidency of the United States, billionaires and businessmen, Pulitzer Prize-winning authors, Olympians and other influential people in the areas of business, government, culture and sport. A 2009 report by the Boston Business Journal showed that two of the top six largest companies (in terms of annual revenue) in Massachusetts had a Tabor graduate as CEO.

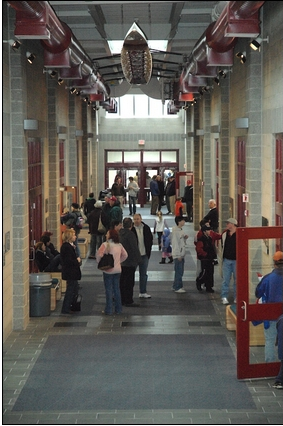
Fish Center for Health & Athletics

=== Academics and writing ===
- Halton Arp '45, astronomer
- Donald Redfield Griffin, Harvard professor, founder of the theory of cognitive ethology
- Thomas Powers '58, author, journalist, intelligence expert, and recipient of the Pulitzer Prize.
- Mike Stewart, novelist

=== Business ===
- Amy Richards '88, President and co-founder, Soapbox Inc
- Paul Fireman '62, billionaire, founder and President of Reebok
- John Fish '78, President of Suffolk Construction Company
- Edward Johnson, III, '50, billionaire, Chairman of Fidelity Investments, member of the Boston Brahmin Perkins bloodline

=== Media and entertainment ===
- Devon Barley '09, singer, finalist on season one of The Voice
- Arthur Chen, actor
- David Chokachi, actor
- Amy Correia, musician
- Marc Friedman, instrumentalist and composer
- Chris Hawkins, British journalist and BBC Radio host
- Sally Taylor, musician
- The Slip, a contemporary avant-rock trio (formed while students at Tabor)

=== Government ===
- Ed Clark, 1980 candidate for President of the United States on the libertarian ticket
- Chester Nimitz Jr., Navy Cross Recipient, Rear Admiral.
- Samuel Loring Morison, Naval intelligence official
- Matthew A. Reynolds, former Assistant Secretary of State (Legislative Affairs)
- Bruce Sundlun '38, governor of Rhode Island, 1991-95.
- Sir William J.M. Shelton, member of British Parliament and was the Parliamentary Private Secretary under Margaret Thatcher
- Kevin White, mayor of Boston (1968–84)

=== Sports ===
- Shane Lachance, professional hockey player currently in the New Jersey Devils organization
- Rich Brennan, former NHL hockey player
- Colleen Coyne, 1998, Nagano Olympian in hockey for women's ice hockey.
- Gia Doonan, 2020, Tokyo Olympian in rowing, Gold at the 2018 World Rowing Championships and bronze at the 2019 World Rowing Championships.
- Rob Douglas, former world speed sailing record setter.
- Chris Ferraro, former NHL hockey player and NCAA national champion
- Peter Ferraro, former NHL hockey player and NCAA national champion
- Torin Francis, professional basketball player
- Fran Healy, professional baseball player and sportscaster
- Robert Hirst, 1992, Barcelona and 1996 Atlanta Olympic athlete in sailing for the British Virgin Islands.
- Jesse Kirkland, 2012 London Olympic athlete in sailing for Bermuda
- Zander Kirkland, 2012 London Olympic athlete in sailing for Bermuda
- Jayson Megna, 2009, current professional hockey player 2023 for Anaheim Ducks
- Eric Nickulas, former NHL hockey player
- Charlie Ogletree, four-time Olympian in sailing and silver medalist at the 2004 Athens Olympics
- Deron Quint, former NHL hockey player
- John P. Riley Jr., coach of the US Olympic gold medal ice hockey team in 1960; player, US Olympic ice hockey team (1948); ice hockey coach, West Point Military Academy for over 30 years
- Travis Roy, former ice hockey player, author and philanthropist
- Jared Shuster (born 1998), Atlanta Braves baseball pitcher, 2020 MLB first-round draft pick
- Blake Sloan, former NHL, AHL and DHL hockey player for Dallas Stars among other teams through 2013 season
- Sean Sullivan, MLB player
- Peter Teravainen, 1974, former PGA Tour and European Tour golfer

=== Other ===
- Richard T. Nolan, writer, professor, Episcopal priest
