= Calming Night Partner =

EP by Land of Talk
- Released: November 12, 2021
- Recorded: 2020
- Studios: Montreal, Canada
- Genre: Indie rock
- Labels: Saddle Creek; Dine Alone Records
- Producers: Elizabeth Powell; Mark Wheaton

Land of Talk chronology
Indistinct Conversations (2020)	Calming Night Partner (2021)	Performances (2023)

Calming Night Partner is the fourth EP release by Canadian indie rock band Land of Talk.It was released on November 12, 2021 on Dine Alone Records in Canada and Saddle Creek Records in the United States. The EP follows their 2020 release Indistinct Conversations and preceded their 2023 album Performances.

== Background ==
On October 13, 2020, through the band's Instagram story, the band confirmed they were working on a new album and EP, with the possibility of releasing the EP in late 2021. Artwork for the new EP was revealed on the band's Instagram on April 14, 2021. On June 6, 2021 the band posted the message 'New EP Coming Soon' their Instagram account, with the words 'Stay Up All Night Wondering How To Make Things Right'. On July 26, 2021, the band confirmed through an Instagram story a new EP would be released in October with a new song to be released "soon", followed by a 15 second clip of a new song titled "Calming Night Partner".

On September 2, 2021, titles of new songs in development were revealed through the band's social media channels, including "Calming Night Partner", "Dogfight", "Something Will Be Said", "Fluorescent Blood", "Make It Out", "Love Will", "Liminal Glide" and "It Didn't Come Easy", some of which would appear on the EP and their next studio album.

On September 22, 2021, the band revealed the name of the new EP as Calming Night Partner through an Instagram story. On October 2, 2021 Land of Talk revealed the title of the first track to be lifted from the EP, "Moment Feed", with confirmation a music video directed by aitso would be released. On October 12, 2021, the lead track from their forthcoming EP was released. The EP will be released on November 12, 2021 as a digital only release. Other tracks to feature on the EP include "Calming Night Partner", "Leave Life Alone" and "Something Will Be Said".

The EP was funded through a Government of Canada music initiative in response to COVID-19, and was recorded over 10 days.

In 2024, Saddle Creek Records confirmed a physical limited edition vinyl release for the EP. The special release is titled The EPs which features tracks from 'Calming Night Partner' and 'Fun and Laugher'.

== Singles ==
The first single lifted from the EP was "Moment Feed", supported by a music video directed by AITSO. Both the single and music video were made available from October 12, 2021.

A second single from the EP, titled "Calming Night Partner", was released on November 2, 2021.

== Track listing ==
1. "Leave Life Alone" – 4:25
2. "Moment Feed" – 4:27
3. "Calming Night Partner" – 4:01
4. "Something Will Be Said" – 5:43

== Personnel ==
- Elizabeth Powell – vocals, guitar, arrangement, keyboards, production, arrangement, artwork
- Mark "Bucky" Wheaton – drums, arrangement
- Christopher McCarron – brass, arrangement
- Pietro Amato – brass and keyboards
- Erik Hove – brass
- Mathieu Parisien and Jonas Bonetta - engineers
- Jadon Ulrich - design
