= Applause Cheer Boo Hiss =

EP by Land of Talk
- Released: April 4, 2006
- Studio: Breakglass Studio (Montreal)
- Genre: Indie rock
- Length: 27:10
- Labels: Dependent Music, Rebel Group

Land of Talk chronology
Applause Cheer Boo Hiss (2006)	Some Are Lakes (2008)

Professional ratings
Review scores
Source	Rating
AllMusic	4/5 stars
PopMatters	8/10
Pitchfork Media	7.5/10
Robert Christgau	(1-star Honorable Mention)
Stylus Magazine	B-
Drowned in Sound	6/10
Spin	(favorable)
Exclaim!	(favorable)

Applause Cheer Boo Hiss is the first extended play (EP) by Canadian indie rock band Land of Talk, released on April 4, 2006, on Dependent Music in Canada. It would later be released on Rebel Group Records in the United States on March 20, 2007.

The title of the album comes from the Star Trek episode "Break and Circuses". In the episode, applause and cheers in the television broadcast for System 892 are shown to be controlled with a dial with labels "applause" and "cheers".

In July 2024, the EP was re-released by One Independent Records and Saddle Creek Records on vinyl with the title Applause Cheer Boo Hiss: The Definitive Edition.

== Track listing ==
Original 2006 release
No.	Title	Length
1.	"Speak to Me Bones"	3:31
2.	"Sea Foam"	3:32
3.	"Summer Special"	2:57
4.	"Breaxxbaxx"	3:37
5.	"Magnetic Hill"	4:26
6.	"All My Friends"	4:02
7.	"Street Wheels"	5:05
Total length:		27:10

Applause Cheer Boo Hiss: The Definitive Edition
No.	Title	Length
8.	"Young Bridge"	3:51
9.	"Two Ships"	4:02
10.	"Dark Nature Places"	3:59
Total length:		38:59

Disc 2: L'Aventure Acoustique
No.	Title	Length
1.	"Speak to Me Bones"	3:28
2.	"Sea Foam"	4:09
3.	"Summer Special"	3:11
4.	"Breaxxbaxx"	4:01
5.	"Magnetic Hill"	4:49
6.	"All My Friends"	2:21
7.	"Street Wheels"	8:31
8.	"Young Bridge"	3:39
9.	"Some Are Lakes"	2:17
10.	"Weighty Ghost" (cover of Wintersleep)	2:29
Total length:		38:55

Digital-only bonus tracks
No.	Title	Length
1.	"Young Bridge (P-Dub radio mix)"	3:15
2.	"Sea Foam (live at Lee's Palace)"	3:19
3.	"Speak to Me Bones (P-Dub radio mix)"	2:55
4.	"It's OK (live at XM Radio)"	5:08
5.	"The Man Who Breaks Things (Lexxx radio mix)"	2:32
Total length:		17:09
