= Words Came Back to Me =

Studio album by Sonya Kitchell
- Released: April 4, 2006
- Genre: Rock
- Length: 51:11
- Label: Velour
- Producer: Jeff Patrick Krasno

Sonya Kitchell chronology
Cold Day (2005)	Words Came Back to Me (2006)	This Storm (2008)

Professional ratings
Review scores
Source	Rating
About	4/5 stars
HARP	(Favorable)
One Way Magazine	(Favorable)
RocknWorld.com	3.5/5 stars
Soul Shine	4/5 stars

Words Came Back to Me is the full-length debut album of Sonya Kitchell. It was released on April 4, 2006 on Velour Recordings. It was sold not only in music shops but also in coffee shops. "Can't Get You Out Of My Mind" was played on the ninth episode of first season of Private Practice.

== Track listing ==
1. "Let Me Go" – 3:35
2. "Train" – 4:15
3. "Can't Get You Out Of My Mind" – 4:09
4. "Words" – 4:02
5. "Cold Day" – 3:10
6. "No Matter What" – 3:58
7. "Simple Melody" – 3:26
8. "Think of You" – 4:08
9. "Too Beautiful" – 4:56
10. "Tinted Glass" – 4:16
11. "I'd Love You" – 4:01
12. "Jerry" – 7:15

== Personnel ==
- Sonya Kitchell: vocals
- John Shannon: guitar
- Garth Stevens: bass
- Conor Meehan: drums
- Miro Sprague: piano/organ

== Charts ==
Chart (2006)	Peak position
US Billboard 200	172
US Billboard Top Heatseekers	6
US Billboard Top Independent Albums	14
