= Live Is My Jumby =

Live album by The Slip
- Released: 2002
- Recorded: 2001
- Genres: Indie rock, jazz fusion
- Length: 67:08
- Label: KA

The Slip chronology
| Does (2000) | Live Is My Jumby (2002) | Angels Come on Time (2002) |

Professional ratings
Review scores
| Source | Rating |
|---|---|
| AllMusic | 4/5 stars |

Live Is My Jumby is a live album by Boston trio The Slip. It was recorded in 2001 at the Aladdin Theater in Portland, Oregon, and The Wetlands in New York City, and was released in 2002 on the band's own KA record label.

== Track listing ==
1. "Wolof" – 12:17
2. "Pictures of Calysto" – 11:47
3. "The Lucky Dragon" – 12:13
4. "Wompsett" – 9:55
5. "Yellow Medicine" – 20:56
