= Cold Day (EP) =

EP by Sonya Kitchell
- Released: February 8, 2005
- Label: Velour

Sonya Kitchell chronology
Cold Day (2005)	Words Came Back to Me (2006)

Cold Day is Sonya Kitchell's debut EP. It was released on February 8, 2005.

JazzTimes opined about several songs in the EP and remarked, "it’s obvious that Kitchell has spent considerable time in the company of the collected works of Joni Mitchell."

Kitchell contributed to the songwriting of all songs in the EP.

== Track listing ==
Cold Day track listing
No.	Title	Length
1.	"Cold Day"	3:10
2.	"Think of You"	4:08
3.	"Tinted Glass"	4:18
4.	"Clara"	4:42
5.	"Fly Away"	4:06
6.	"Someday"	5:16
Total length:		25:40
