= SSV Tabor Boy =

115-foot gaff-rigged, two-masted topsail schooner

History

United States
- Name: Tabor Boy
- Owner: Tabor Academy
- Launched: 1914
- Acquired: 1954
- Fate: Sail Training Vessel
- Status: In active service

General characteristics
- Class & type: Pilot Schooner
- Tonnage: 99 grt
- Length: 115 feet (35 m) feet
- Beam: 20 feet
- Draft: 10 feet 4 inches
- Propulsion: Auxiliary Sail
- Sail plan: Gaff Topsail Schooner
- Complement: 24 overnight, 49 daysail
- Armament: Signal Cannon (previously)

The SSV Tabor Boy is a 115-foot gaff-rigged, two-masted topsail schooner that has been a part of the Tabor Academy in Marion, Massachusetts since 1954. SSV stands for Sailing School Vessel and is the U.S. Coast Guard’s designation for the schooner. She is one of two Coast Guard inspected vessels in her class that operate in the Northeast United States. She is also the only vessel licensed to sail with a single captain and a crew composed entirely of students led by a upperclassman Executive Officer.

== Orientation at sea ==
Each summer Tabor offers all incoming students a one-week sailing trip aboard the schooner. Each week of the seven-week "Orientation at Sea" program brings together fifteen new students, one or two Tabor faculty members, and current student crew members for six days of sailing along the coast of Massachusetts, intended to be educational. For new students, the cruise is considered a great introduction to Tabor. It can be used as an opportunity to make friends with fellow newcomers, teachers, and returning students before starting school in the fall, while at the same time getting a general introduction to oceanology, marine biology, and environmental studies. As part of the schooner's crew, students also learn to handle sail, stand watch, steer a course, perform emergency at sea situations, and take part in the various other duties involved in manning a large sailing vessel.

== History ==
Built in 1914 in the Netherlands as Loodsschoener II, she was initially constructed to serve as pilot ship at the Rijkswerf in Amsterdam for the Dutch pilotage authorities. In 1923 she was acquired by the Dutch Merchant Marine who renamed her Bestevaer and used her to train officer candidates. During the Second World War the ship was requisitioned by the Kriegsmarine, which she served until the end of the war. She briefly went to the Russians before being reclaimed by the Netherlands and upon her return became private property. In 1950 Bestevaer was equipped as a yacht and sold to R. C. Allen of R. C. Allen Business Machines in Holland, Michigan. Allen sailed her to America and in 1954 presented her as a gift to the Tabor Academy who renamed her S.S.V. Tabor Boy. She is the fourth ship so named to serve the Tabor Academy. Today, the SSV Tabor Boy is a Coast Guard-inspected and certified Sailing School Vessel and is equipped with up-to-date safety gear and navigation electronics. Her various programs offer Tabor students a broad variety of opportunities to experience and learn from the sea. Tabor Boy has sailed between Maine and the Caribbean Sea, including a 1993 voyage through the Panama Canal. In 2006, D.N. Kelley & Sons shipyard in Fairhaven, Massachusetts, subcontracted NorEast Marine Systems to do a total refit on the ship which included: Rebuilding water maker, installing new refrigeration, rewiring AC/DC electrical panels, installing new plumbing for all domestic water and re-designing the engine room. In 2020, Tabor Boy entered another major maintenance period which included a brand-new deckhouse fabricated by Gladding-Hearn Shipbuilding in Somerset, Massachusetts, new standing rigging, and recoating and fastening ballast within the orlop deck.
