= The Slip (band) =

Avant-rock trio from Boston

- The Slip (L–R): Brad Barr, Marc Friedman, and Andrew Barr

Background information
- Origin: Boston, Massachusetts, U.S.
- Genres: Avant-rock, indie rock, jazz fusion
- Years active: 1996–2012, 2015–present
- Labels: KA, Flying Frog, Rykodisc, 216, Bar/None
- Members: Andrew Barr; Brad Barr; Marc Friedman
- Website: www.theslip.com

The Slip is an avant-rock trio from Boston, Massachusetts. The band consists of Providence, Rhode Island brothers Brad Barr (guitar, piano, vocals) and Andrew Barr (drums), and Marc Friedman (bass guitar). The three also play with singer-songwriter Nathan Moore (of ThaMuseMeant) and keyboardist Marco Benevento in Surprise Me Mr. Davis. Brad and Andrew Barr additionally perform with Montreal-based ensemble The Barr Brothers.

== History ==
The band was formed at Tabor Academy in Marion, Massachusetts, in 1989 as a student rock band that toured New England high school campuses. The founding members (guitarist Howard Gould, husband of Court TV anchor Ashleigh Banfield, drummer Mike Johnson, lead guitarist Johnny Myers, bassist Cain Goettleman, and singer Jack Lewin) left the band upon graduating in 1990 and 1991, leaving it in the hands of the three current members. In the early days the band saw members come and go including singer Sally Taylor, the daughter of Carly Simon and James Taylor. All three current members were students and eventual graduates of Tabor Academy. After attending the Berklee School of Music in Boston for a short time, the trio collectively dropped out in 1996 to push their debut self-released album, From the Gecko.

Following consistent touring, mostly in the Northeast but eventually in the West as well, the band was signed to Butch Trucks's label Flying Frog Records, where they put out Does in 2000. Subsequent years saw continued touring, including their first trip to Japan, and the release of the band's first live album, Live Is My Jumby. The Slip then signed to Rykodisc, releasing Angels Come on Time in 2002.

In 2003, the companion live albums Alivelectric and Aliveacoustic were released on the band's own label, 216 Records. The former was a mostly instrumental exploration into experimental noise collages, reminiscent at times of post-rock bands such as Do Make Say Think and Tortoise, or electronic acts like Squarepusher. The latter consisted of Americana-tinged folk songs with an emphasis on lyrics, though some songs such as "Torque" and "Song" were more reminiscent of earlier, jazz-influenced Slip work.

Starting in 2004, the band began to focus less energy on touring as The Slip and more on the Surprise Me Mr. Davis side project and the new Slip studio album. In 2005, the song "Even Rats", an early cut from the newest studio sessions, was featured on the PlayStation 2 video game Guitar Hero. The song was also released as a single available only online in 2006. Justin Vernon, of Bon Iver, was influenced by the group.

During 2005 and 2006, The Slip gained greater recognition after appearances at festivals such as Bonnaroo, SXSW, Bumbershoot, and High Sierra Music Festival. After a long period of record label shopping, "Even Rats" and other songs finally saw release on the album Eisenhower, released in November 2006 on Bar/None Records. Eisenhower saw an evolution in their sound, incorporating indie rock influences from bands like Built to Spill and The Flaming Lips. The Slip supported the album by touring throughout the United States and Canada, including a run of dates opening for the indie rock band My Morning Jacket in November and December 2006. The album also placed an emphasis on songwriting over improvisation. On February 5, 2007, the Slip made their national television debut on Late Night with Conan O'Brien, playing "Children of December". The following June, they performed at the Bonnaroo Music Festival in Tennessee for the second time.

Starting in late 2007, the trio took an unannounced hiatus from regular touring and have since only played occasional gigs as The Slip. The members have been pursuing musical endeavors outside of the band. In 2008 The Slip supported Sonya Kitchell in a tour for her album This Storm. The album is a collaboration between Kitchell, Brad Barr, Andrew Barr, and Malcolm Burn.

Brad, Andrew and Marc have continued to play with Nathan Moore and Marco Benevento in the band Surprise Me Mr. Davis. After moving to Montreal in 2005, Brad and Andrew pursued solo projects culminating in The Barr Brothers, also featuring Sarah Page on Harp and multi-instrumentalist Andres Vial. Marc Friedman has performed as a member of Marco Benevento's trio as well as collaborating with San Francisco-based Big Light, producing their upcoming album and subbing for bassist Steve Adams for many gigs.

In 2009, The Slip played a short East Coast Summer tour and returned to High Sierra Music Festival in Quincy, California, on July 4 and 5. 2010 saw only a handful of shows in New York, Austin & San Francisco as well as their 13th consecutive year at High Sierra Music Festival, a higher total than any other band in the history of the festival. February 2011 brought the return of The Slip to Japan as well as dates at the Brooklyn Bowl in Williamsburg, New York on July 14, 2011 and The Met in Pawtucket, RI on July 16, 2011. 2012 was rung in with two shows at San Francisco's Cafe Du Nord on December 30 & 31, 2011.

The future of The Slip seems to be on hold as the founding members, Brad and Andrew, had been focusing their work into The Barr Brothers as of late. The Slip has reportedly been working on recording a follow-up album to Eisenhower since 2009 and have introduced several new songs as cuts from the supposed album in their latest live performances. Bassist Marc Friedman still resides in California, supposedly working on new material as he explores various musical endeavours. 2013 marked the first in 15 years the group had been absent from the lineup of High Sierra Music Festival. They were absent from the festival lineup in 2014 as well, still focusing more energy into other musical endeavours. In early 2015, The Slip announced a return to the festival for the 2015 lineup. This would be the band's first performance since 2011.

In 2021 the band reunited for three sets at LOCKN' Farm as part of Joe Russo's Almost Dead's curated festival in mid-August. Soon after, The Slip announced their first proper tour since 2009. The seven-show-run included stops in Burlington, Providence, Boston, Philly, Brooklyn, and finished up at Levon Helm's barn in Woodstock, New York. The shows saw the trio revisit early material, re-work fan favourites, and debut new songs. On several occasions throughout the tour, lead singer and guitarist Brad Barr acknowledged the band's shape-shifting musical identity, their need for an extended hiatus, and their overall optimism for the future of The Slip.

== Discography ==
- From the Gecko – 1997
- Does – 2000
- Live Is My Jumby – 2002
- Angels Come on Time – 2002
- Aliveacoustic – 2003
- Alivelectric – 2003
- Live at Lupo's 6/12/04 – 2005
- Eisenhower (Bar/None) – 2006
- Superterranean Onlyness – 2021
