= Cloak and Cipher =

Studio album by Land of Talk
- Released: August 24, 2010
- Genre: Indie rock
- Length: 48:54
- Label: Saddle Creek Records

Land of Talk chronology
Some Are Lakes (2005)	Cloak and Cipher (2010)	Life After Youth (2017)

Cloak and Cipher is the second full-length album by Canadian indie rock band Land of Talk, released August 24, 2010, on Saddle Creek Records.

The album features special guests including Patrick Watson as well as members of Stars, Thee Silver Mt. Zion, Wintersleep, The Besnard Lakes, Arcade Fire and Esmerine.

The album was named as a longlisted nominee for the 2011 Polaris Music Prize.

== Track listing ==
No.	Title	Length
1.	"Cloak and Cipher"	3:47
2.	"Goaltime Exposure"	5:42
3.	"Quarry Hymns"	5:46
4.	"Swift Coin"	4:51
5.	"Color Me Badd"	3:59
6.	"The Hate I Won't Commit"	5:01
7.	"Hamburg, Noon"	3:33
8.	"Blangee Blee"	4:08
9.	"Playita"	5:56
10.	"Better and Closer"	6:12
