= Is There Life After Youth? =

- Genre: talk show
- Presented by: Daniel Levinson
- Country of origin: Canada
- Original language: English
- No. of seasons: 1
- No. of episodes: 4

Production
- Producer: Mark Blandford
- Production location: Quebec
- Running time: 30 minutes

Original release
- Network: CBC Television
- Release: 14 October – 4 November 1974

Is There Life After Youth? is a Canadian talk show television miniseries that aired on CBC Television in 1974.

== Premise ==
American psychologist Daniel Levinson hosted this four-part series on middle age and its phases. It was recorded on location at a resort in Quebec with a panel of 12 people aged from 38 to 50 who discussed their life decisions.

== Scheduling ==
This half-hour series was broadcast on Mondays at 10:00 p.m. (Eastern) from 14 October to 4 November 1974.
