= Queens of the Breakers =

Studio album by The Barr Brothers
- Released: October 13, 2017
- Length: 50:51
- Label: Secret City

The Barr Brothers chronology
Sleeping Operator (2014)	Queens of the Breakers (2017)

Professional ratings
Aggregate scores
Source	Rating
Metacritic	77/100
Review scores
Source	Rating
Exclaim!	9/10
Paste	8.7/10

Queens of the Breakers is the third studio album by Canadian trio The Barr Brothers. It was released in October 13, 2017 through Secret City Records.

== Accolades ==
Publication	Accolade	Rank	Ref.
Exclaim!	Top 10 Country/Folk Albums of 2017	7	
Gigwise	Top 50 Albums of 2017	42	

== Track listing ==
No.	Title	Length
1.	"Defibrillation"	5:33
2.	"Look Before It Changes"	4:38
3.	"Song That I Heard"	3:57
4.	"Maybe Someday"	4:11
5.	"Kompromat"	4:34
6.	"You Would Have to Lose Your Mind"	6:21
7.	"Queens of the Breakers"	5:28
8.	"It Came to Me"	4:21
9.	"Hideous Glorious"	4:14
10.	"Hideous Glorious, Pt. 2"	1:47
11.	"Ready for War"	5:47

== Charts ==
Chart (2017)	Peak position
Canadian Albums (Billboard)	29
