= Lara Kramer =

Canadian dancer and artist

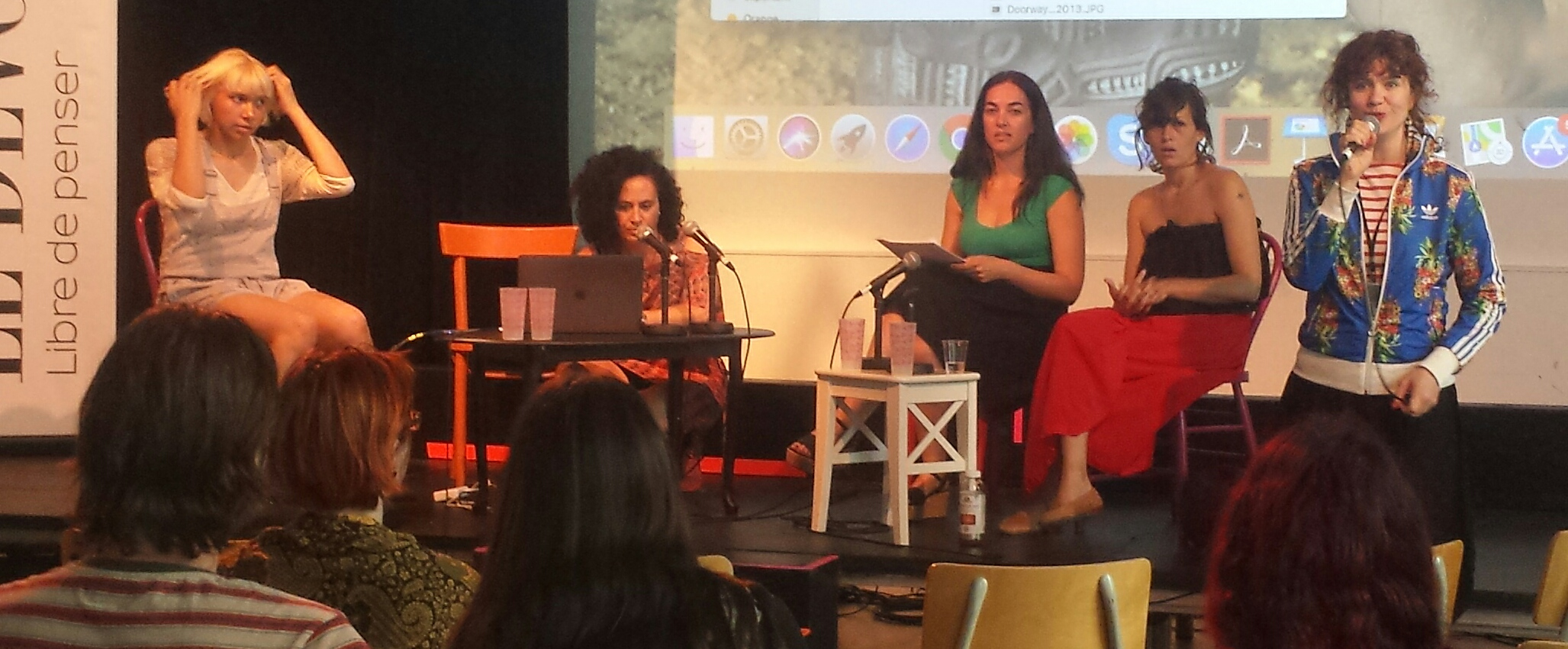
Lara Kramer (far right) photographed in Montréal, Québec, Canada at the 2018 TransAmerica Festival

Lara Kramer is a Canadian choreographer, dancer, and multidisciplinary artist of mixed Oji-Cree and settler heritage. She is known for her works about Indigenous identity, trauma, and resilience. Her work in dance, performance art, and installation has been presented worldwide, notably in Australia, New Zealand, Martinique, the United Kingdom, and the United States.

== Biography ==
Lara Kramer was born in London, Ontario. She obtained a bachelor's degree in dance from Concordia University. In 2012, she founded the company Lara Kramer Danse. In 2021, her work In Blankets, Herds and Ghosts, presented by Dazibao in partnership with the MAI (Montréal, arts interculturels), was part of the programming for the 17th edition of the MOMENTA Biennale.

She currently lives and works in Montreal.

== Works ==
=== Dance ===
- NGS (“Native Girl Syndrome”) (2013)
- Windigo (2018)
- Dream Installation (2019)
- Eating Bones and Licking Bread (2020)
- Them voices (2021)
- Gorgeous Tongue (2024)
- This is the Place Where We Pray (2024)

=== Public Art ===
- Blankets, Herds and Ghosts (2021)

=== Exhibitions ===
- Phantom Stills & Vibrations (2018)
