= Some Are Lakes =

Studio album by Land of Talk
- Released: October 7, 2008
- Genre: Indie rock
- Length: 39:11
- Labels: Secret City Records (Canada); Saddle Creek Records (US)
- Producers: Justin Vernon and Land of Talk

Land of Talk chronology
Applause Cheer Boo Hiss (2005)	Some Are Lakes (2008)	Cloak and Cipher (2010)

Some Are Lakes is the first full-length album by Canadian indie rock band Land of Talk, released October 7, 2008, on Secret City Records in Canada and Saddle Creek Records in the United States.

The album was produced by Justin Vernon of the American indie folk group Bon Iver. The title derives from someone in the studio session incorrectly transcribing "summer lake" (title and lyric in track "Some Are Lakes") as "some are lakes".

Professional ratings
Aggregate scores
Source	Rating
Metacritic	(74/100)
Review scores
Source	Rating
AllMusic	4/5 stars
BBC Music	(mixed)
PopMatters	7/10 stars
New York Times	(favorable)
Robert Christgau	(1-star Honorable Mention)
Tiny Mix Tapes	3/5 marks

== Track listing ==
No.	Title	Length
1.	"Yuppy Flu"	5:08
2.	"Death by Fire"	4:10
3.	"The Man Who Breaks Things (Dark Shuffle)"	2:11
4.	"Some Are Lakes"	3:41
5.	"Give Me Back My Heart Attack"	4:27
6.	"It's Okay"	4:54
7.	"Young Bridge"	3:45
8.	"Corner Phone"	3:14
9.	"Got a Call"	4:19
10.	"Troubled"	3:23

== Critical reception ==
In October 2008, David Bevan of Pitchfork gave the album a 6.9/10. With oral influence from bands Sonic Youth, Fleetwood Mac, and Afghan Whigs, Bevan reports that "...while just as thorny and gnarled in parts...its calms are ultimately more haunting and compelling than its many storms."
