= ThaMuseMeant =

American musical group

- Origin: Austin, Texas, Santa Fe, New Mexico, Portland, Oregon
- Genres: Folk rock
- Years active: 1993–2001; 2003–present
- Labels: Frogville Records; High Sierra Records
- Members: Nathan Moore; Aimee Curl; Enion Pelta–Tiller; David Tiller
- Past members: Jeff Sussman

ThaMuseMeant is an American folk-rock quartet. The band has had three permanent members since the beginning: Aimee Curl (acoustic bass and vocals), Nathan Moore (guitar and vocals), and David Tiller (mandolin, fiddle, guitar). Prior to 2001 the band contained Jeff Sussman on percussion instead of Enion Pelta-Tiller on violin, who joined in 2003. Originally from Virginia, the bandmembers met in Austin, Texas. They spent some time in Santa Fe, New Mexico, and Portland, Oregon, oscillating between these two Western cities. Nathan Moore's poetic lyrics, Aimee Curl's singing style combines with David Tiller and Enion Pelta-Tiller's technique in their respective instruments to create a unique sound. Movin By Lovin is the title of one of their songs, which is also the title for a documentary about ThaMuseMeant. ThaMuseMeant toured in the Summer of 2007 for the first time in two years and played at the High Sierra Music Festival in July 2007.

== Etymology ==
The name ThaMuseMeant is a pun on the word amusement, an English word for excitement or glee. The name came to the band back in the early 1990s when the band was just a trio composed of Aimee Curl, Nathan Moore, and David Tiller. The group was looking for a band name in the dictionary when they saw the word amusement, a fun question they felt their music might answer.

In search of the Goddess of Music, the Muse, the band's entire quest was to find out "what the Muse meant?" in a wholly artistic philosophers quest to unravel the cryptic messages that live in-between the spaces, music by nature disappears as soon as you create it and sometimes the words just come to you on the wind as if the Muse herself was whispering in your ear.... what was it Tha Muse Meant?

== Band members ==
=== Line-up (2003-present) ===
- Nathan Moore - Guitar, lead vocals (1993–present)
- Aimee Curl - Bass, lead vocals (1993–present)
- Enion Pelta-Tiller - Violin, background vocals (2003–present)
- David Tiller - Mandolin, background vocals, various (1993–present)

=== Timeline ===
(1993–2001)	Nathan Moore - Guitar, lead vocals; Aimee Curl - Bass, lead vocals; David Tiller - Mandolin, violin; Jeff Sussman - Drums
(2001)	Nathan Moore - Guitar, lead vocals; Aimee Curl - Bass, lead vocals; David Tiller - Mandolin, violin
(2003–Present)	Nathan Moore - Guitar, lead vocals; Aimee Curl - Bass, lead vocals; David Tiller - Mandolin, background vocals, various; Enion Pelta-Tiller - Violin, background vocals
