= The Young Adults =

American rock group

The Young Adults were an American rock quintet based in Providence, Rhode Island. They were formed by vocalist/saxophone player Bruce McCrae (aka Rudy Cheeks), vocalist/drummer David Hansen (aka Sport Fisher), drummer Jimmy Whittle, piano player Jeff Shore, guitarist Ed Vallee, and bassist Roy Gilley in the early 1970s.

Founding member Thom Enright died from brain cancer on February 20, 2012, at the age of 59.

In April 2016, McCrae (as The Fabulous Motels/The Young Adults/Rudy Cheeks) was among the inductees who were brought into the Rhode Island Music Hall of Fame (RIMHOF).

Rudy Cheeks died in September 2026, at the age of 76.

== Discography ==
- "Complex World/Beer", 1979, single, Genius Records
- Helping Others, 1988, album, Heartbreak Hits

Side A

1. "Complex World" (4:39)
2. "A Power Tool Is Not a Toy" (4:12)
3. "Beer" (3:04)
4. "Summer Song" (3:45)
5. "Men" (6:10)

Side B

1. "Meat Rampage" (4:58)
2. "Christmas In Japan In July" (3:20)
3. "Meeting Girls" (3:41)
4. "New Deal" (3:57)
5. "Drunken Celebrities" (5:42)

== Members ==
- Bruce McCrae (aka Rudy Cheeks) – vocals, saxophone, percussion (died 2026)
- David Hansen (aka Sport Fisher) – vocals, drums, guitar
- Jeff Shore – piano
- Ed Vallee – guitar
- Roy Gilley – bass
- Thom Enright – bass, guitar (died 2012)
- John Rufo – bass
- Tom Dequattro – drums (died 2013)
- Paul ILL – bass
- Jim Whittle – drums (died 2006)
