= Life After Youth =

Studio album by Land of Talk
- Released: May 19, 2017
- Genre: Indie rock
- Length: 38:00
- Labels: Dine Alone Records; Saddle Creek Records

Land of Talk chronology
Cloak and Cipher (2010)	Life After Youth (2017)	Indistinct Conversations (2020)

Life After Youth is the third full-length album by Canadian indie rock band Land of Talk, released May 19, 2017 on Dine Alone Records in Canada and Saddle Creek Records in the United States.

The album's release followed a seven-year hiatus. The album was nominated for Best Alternative Album at the Juno Awards of 2018.

== Track listing ==
No.	Title	Length
1.	"Yes You Were"	2:43
2.	"This Time"	5:48
3.	"Loving"	3:49
4.	"What Was I Thinking?"	2:32
5.	"Spiritual Intimidation"	3:48
6.	"Heartcore"	3:54
7.	"Inner Lover"	5:23
8.	"World Made"	3:11
9.	"In Florida"	2:59
10.	"Macabre"	4:47

== Reviews ==
Upon the album's release the album was generally well-received by critics with NPR giving the album a positive review along with The Irish Times where the album went on to receive a four out of a five-star rating stating the album as "the most intriguing album of immersive, de-stressed guitar pop-rock you’ll hear this summer". Pitchfork gave the album a rating of 7.0 within the review it stated the album is "full of unpredictable songwriting twists and poetically opaque lyrics". Paste gave the album an 8.6 rating.
