= From the Gecko =

Studio album by The Slip
- Released: March 7, 1997
- Genre: Jazz fusion, indie rock
- Label: KA
- Producer: The Slip, Martin Guigui

The Slip chronology
From the Gecko (1997)	Does (2000)

Professional ratings
Review scores
Source	Rating
Allmusic	2.5/5 stars

From the Gecko is the debut studio album by Boston band The Slip. It was released in 1997 on the band's KA Records label.

The album features guest musicians Timo Shanko (tenor sax), Daisuke Fujiwara (soprano sax), and Gus Zeising (soprano sax) on selected tracks.

== Track listing ==
1. "Munf" – 6:19
2. "Alsoa" – 6:25
3. "Yellow Medicine" – 8:45
4. "The Weight of Solomon" – 8:09
5. "Spice Groove" – 4:46
6. "Cumulus" – 8:01
7. "Eube" – 8:23
8. "Children of Atlantis" – 6:06
9. "Island of Peace" – 2:03
10. "Honey Melon" – 11:17
11. "Entering Saugus" – 3:44

All tracks credited to The Slip.

== Personnel ==
=== Musical ===
- Timo Shanko – tenor saxophone
- Gus Ziesing – soprano saxophone
- Daisuke Fujiwara – soprano saxophone
- Andrew Barr – drums
- Brad Barr – guitar, keyboards, vocals
- Marc Freidman – bass

=== Technical ===
- The Slip – producer, engineer
- Martin Guigui – producer
- Gus Ziesing – engineer
- David Correia – engineer, mixing
- Andy Hall – engineer, mixing
- Barrett Rogers – illustrations
- Kim Wallace – illustrations
- Jason Booth – layout design
