= Angels Come on Time =

Studio album by The Slip
- Released: July 9, 2002
- Recorded: 2001
- Genre: Indie rock, jazz fusion
- Label: Rykodisc
- Producer: The Slip

The Slip chronology
| Live Is My Jumby (2002) | Angels Come on Time (2002) | Aliveacoustic (2003) |

Professional ratings
Review scores
| Source | Rating |
|---|---|
| AllMusic | 2.5/5 stars |

Angels Come on Time is a self-produced album by Boston trio The Slip. It was released in 2002 as the band's debut album for the Rykodisc record label. It was recorded in 2001, in part at The Barn, a recording studio owned by Phish's Trey Anastasio. Timo Shanko appears in a supporting role on Angels Come on Time, playing saxophone on selected tracks. The album earned Relix magazine's "Studio Album of the Year", tying for the award with Medeski Martin & Wood's Uninvisible.

== Track listing ==
1. "Landing" – 2:20
2. "Get Me With Fuji" – 5:01
3. "Sometimes True to Nothing" – 7:17
4. "Sorry" – 4:43
5. "Tinderbox" – 9:19
6. "Love and Tears" – 3:47
7. "The Nashua Rose" – 6:31
8. "Stomping Grounds" – 0:52
9. "(Take A) Beetle to the Badlands" – 4:15
10. "Jumby" – 2:39
11. "6-Sided" – 3:40
12. "Nellie Jean" – 7:55
