= Does (album) =

Studio album by The Slip
- Released: June 20, 2000
- Recorded: June 1999
- Genre: Indie rock, jazz fusion
- Length: 66:52
- Label: Flying Frog

The Slip chronology
From the Gecko (1997)	Does (2000)	Live Is My Jumby (2001)

Professional ratings
Review scores
Source	Rating
Allmusic	2.5/5 stars

Does is the second album by indie rock band The Slip. It was released in 2000 on Butch Trucks' record label, Flying Frog Records.

== Track listing ==
1. "Catacea" – 2:43
2. "So Dope" – 5:35
3. "Paint Cans" – 1:13
4. "The Invocation" – 4:10
5. "Johnny's Tune" – 6:54
6. "When Cloudy Hushes Moon" – 5:06
7. "A Crack in the Sundial" – 6:44
8. "Hallway" – 0:19
9. "My Room" – 4:38
10. "Hey Worrier" – 4:53
11. "Tohu Bohu" – 7:01
12. "Rhythm and Gold" – 8:11
13. "S'Debatable" – 5:51
14. Untitled – 3:34
