= High Sierra Music Festival =

Music festival in California, USA

- Genre: Jamband, newgrass, psychedelic rock, folk rock, blues rock, jazz, southern rock, progressive rock, blues, country music, southern rock, country rock, bluegrass, others
- Dates: First weekend of July, preceding Thursday and Friday
- Locations: Quincy, California, United States
- Years active: 1991–present
- Website: www.highsierramusic.com

High Sierra Music Festival is a multi-day music festival held in Quincy, California, United States, a mountainous area about 80 miles northwest of Reno, Nevada.

== History ==
The first High Sierra Music Festival was in 1991 at Bear Valley in Alpine County and was the genesis of High Sierra Music, of Berkeley, California. The festival is held each year the weekend of July 4. The four-day festival features an eclectic mix of some of the most famous national and international names in jamband, bluegrass, roots rock, folk rock, southern rock, jazz, country rock, newgrass and blues rock. Away from the music stages, patrons can attend films and movement playshops including yoga, pilates, etc., shop for arts and crafts, or enjoy a wide variety of gourmet food and drink. The organization has also produced festivals and concerts elsewhere in California, and in Maryland, Nevada, Georgia, Massachusetts, and Missouri.

Past artists have included The Black Crowes, Bob Weir & RatDog, Michael Franti & Spearhead, Béla Fleck and the Flecktones, Bruce Hornsby, The String Cheese Incident, Nickel Creek, moe., Jupiter Coyote, Widespread Panic, Medeski Martin & Wood, Yonder Mountain String Band, Gov't Mule, John Butler Trio, Umphrey's McGee, My Morning Jacket, Les Claypool, Leftover Salmon, and The Slip.

== See also ==
- List of bluegrass music festivals
- List of folk festivals
- List of jam band music festivals
