= Jade McNelis =

- Birth name: Cayla Jade
- Born: 1986 (age 38–39); Taiwan
- Origin: Tallahassee, Florida
- Genres: Indie
- Occupation: Singer-songwriter
- Instrument: Piano
- Labels: Chop Shop Records; Good Fences

Jade McNelis (born 1986) is an indie singer-songwriter in Montreal. Her music incorporates vocals and piano arrangements with electronics. She was born in Taiwan and adopted by an American couple who provided her with piano instruction starting at the age of four along with classical music training. McNelis grew up in Tallahassee, Florida. Her musical interests include Radiohead, Yo La Tengo and Sparklehorse, while her piano playing is influenced by Gershwin and Beethoven.

== History ==
Jade McNelis' was raised in her hometown of Tallahassee, Florida. It was here that she first opened for the band Stars in 2005. The lead singer for the band was so impressed by her performance and helped her make the move to Montreal where she would be able to thrive within the artistic community. She was signed to the record label, Good Fences. After recording her All the Fables EP in Montreal at the Studio Plateau in 2006, McNelis decided to move there permanently. Her debut EP was recorded with producers Chris Seligman of Stars and Drew Malamud of The Dears

In 2008, McNelis signed with Chop Shop Records, a California-based record label.

== Publication ==
-All the Fables EP
