= The Barr Brothers =

Canadian-American indie folk band

- Origin: Montreal, Quebec, Canada
- Genres: Indie folk; Delta blues
- Years active: 2006–present
- Label: Secret City
- Members: Brad Barr; Andrew Barr; Morgan Moore; Brett Lanier; Eveline Gregoire-Rousseau; Todd Dahlhoff
- Past members: Sarah Pagé; Andrés "Andy" Vial; Joe Grass
- Website: www.thebarrbrothers.com

The Barr Brothers is an indie folk band founded in Montreal, Quebec in 2006, consisting of two American brothers Andrew (drums, percussion, vocals, keyboards) and Brad Barr (guitar, vocals), pedal steel guitarist Brett Lanier, and harpist Eveline Gregoire-Rousseau.

== History ==
Originally raised and located in Providence, Rhode Island, Brad and Andrew Barr moved to Montreal, Quebec from Boston, Massachusetts in 2005, after a decade of touring and recording as two-thirds of the trio The Slip; The group notable for its approach to long-form, live improvisation, and equally considered part of the jam band and experimental music scenes.

Soon after moving to Montreal and into his new apartment in 2005, singer-songwriter and guitarist Brad Barr heard the sounds of a harp being played next door, and after building the courage, he went next door to introduce himself to his neighbor at the time, Sarah Pagé. Pagé at the time had been performing both in classical contexts, and working to developing music with singer-songwriter Lhasa de Sela. Andrew Barr soon began performing with Lhasa in 2009, as well. Soon enough the trio of Andrew Barr, Brad Barr, and Sarah Pagé began performing songs written by Brad, and Andrew, songs under The Barr Brothers name. Building upon the songs with Malian rhythms, Slide guitar, homemade percussion instruments, and influences from Delta blues, modern classical, and Appalachian musical traditions.

The Barr Brothers' recordings have been nominated three times for Juno Awards: in 2013, 2015 and 2018, for Adult Alternative Album of the Year. Their debut, studio album The Barr Brothers was released on September 27, 2011 and focused on acoustic and electrified songs rooted in Appalachian folk and folk rock. Their second studio album Sleeping Operator released on October 6, 2014 further explored the connections between the Delta blues and its West/North African ancestry. Leftover songs from the Sleeping Operator sessions were released as a five-track collection Alta Falls, released on April 27, 2014. The tracks on the Alta Falls EP were partially recorded in Iceland by Valgeir Sigurösson (Björk, Sigur Rós and Nico Muhly). The band's third album Queens of the Breakers was released on October 17, 2017. In that same year, Secret City Records released a split album called Live, the first half of such titled Patrick Watson & L'Orchestre Cinéma L'Amour - Live At Église Saint-Jean-Baptiste 2013 De Montréal in 2015, with the second half of the album titled The Barr Brothers - Live At Festival International De Jazz De Montréal 2015. On December 4, 2023, two new outtakes from the Sleeping Operator sessions were released exclusively through The Barr Brothers' Patreon page.

The band frequently tours in the United States, Canada, the United Kingdom, and Europe, with few shows played in Japan. Notable venues have included Levon Helm's studio in Woodstock, New York, the Red Rocks Amphitheater, and two appearances on the Late Show with David Letterman.

== Career ==
=== 2011–2013: The Barr Brothers ===
The Barr Brothers toured throughout North America and Europe to support The Barr Brothers, with notable appearances including the 2011 Montreal International Jazz Festival and the 2011 Osheaga. They opened for Ben Harper and Deer Tick, played the CMJ Music Marathon and, in January 2012, made their first appearance on the Late Show with David Letterman. Their song "Beggar In The Morning" debuted on Paste Magazine in March 2012, and they had a headline slot on the main stage Scène TD de la place des Festivals at the 2013 Montreal Jazz Festival; Their song "Ooh, Belle" was used in an episode of the television series Touch.

=== 2014–2016: Sleeping Operator, Alta Falls ===
Shortly before the release of Sleeping Operator, The Barr Brothers performed at Oregon's Pickathon. In addition to the Juno nomination, the band was nominated as Most Illustrious Band Outside of Quebec by ADISQ, the Quebec music award council, and the album was nominated as Anglophone Album of the Year. They also received a nomination for Anglophone Show of the Year.

The record was promoted with global touring. Notable support dates included shows with Calexico and My Morning Jacket in the United States and Europe. The My Morning Jacket tour included the Barr Brothers' first performance at Colorado's Red Rocks Amphitheatre.

As headliners, the band performed with Marco Benevento at the Midnight Ramble Sessions at the Levon Helm studios in Woodstock NY, and performed on the main stage at Osheaga and the Folk On The Rocks festival in Yellowknife. Their most notable headline show was at the Grand Évènement of the Montreal Jazz Festival. Many musician friends made appearances at this show: Patrick Watson, Robbie Kuster, Joe Grass, Michelle Tompkins of Sin & Swoon, Mamadou Kouyaté, and Little Scream's Laurel Sprengelmeyer.

Outside of the band, the Barrs participated in a tribute to The Grateful Dead at the Montreal Folk Fest on the Canal in the summer of 2016. Following the October 2016 death of Leonard Cohen, Brad Barr participated in a tribute to Cohen's music put together by POP Montreal.

=== 2017–2020: Recording and collaboration ===
Anticipated collaborations with the Malian duo Bassekou Kouyate and Amy Sacko, scheduled for the 2017 editions of the Festival d’Été de Québec and the Montreal International Jazz Festival, were cancelled due to Kouyate and Sacko's Visa issues. Replacement players were found in Burkinabé Balafonist Mamadou Koita and Senegalese Kora player Sadio Sissoko, and the resulting show was well reviewed.

Following the release of Queens of the Breakers, the band was invited to open for The War on Drugs across Europe and the UK; and scheduled their own headline shows in major markets in North America, Europe and the United Kingdom. In January 2018, Sarah Pagé left the band to pursue other interests.

In 2018, Compulsion Games revealed that the brothers worked on the soundtrack and performed the songs for the game We Happy Few.

In October 2018, The Barr Brothers won ADISQ's Félix award for Concert of the Year - Anglophone. They were also nominated in four other categories at Gala de l'ADISQ: Album of the Year - Anglophone; Quebec Artist with the Most Success Outside of Quebec; Sound Recording and Mix of the Year; and Soundman of the Year. They performed again at the Levon Helm Studios in December 2018.

In the winter of 2019, the band performed each of their three albums across three nights in Toronto, Montreal, and San Francisco in a series they billed "An Album Nightly". Elizabeth Powell, Jesse Mac Cormack, and Richard Reed Parry opened the shows and contributed throughout the concerts.

=== 2025–present ===
On October 17 2025, the band released a new record, Let It Hiss. They also announced an international tour for the album including dates opening for Mumford and Sons. The album was a Juno Award nominee for Adult Alternative Album of the Year at the Juno Awards of 2026.

== Discography ==
- The Barr Brothers (2011) #63 CAN
- Sleeping Operator (2014)
- Alta Falls (2015, EP)
- Queens of the Breakers (2017) #29 CAN
- Live (2017, split with Patrick Watson)
- Let It Hiss (2025)
