= Nathan Moore (American musician) =

American singer-songwriter and musician (born 1970)

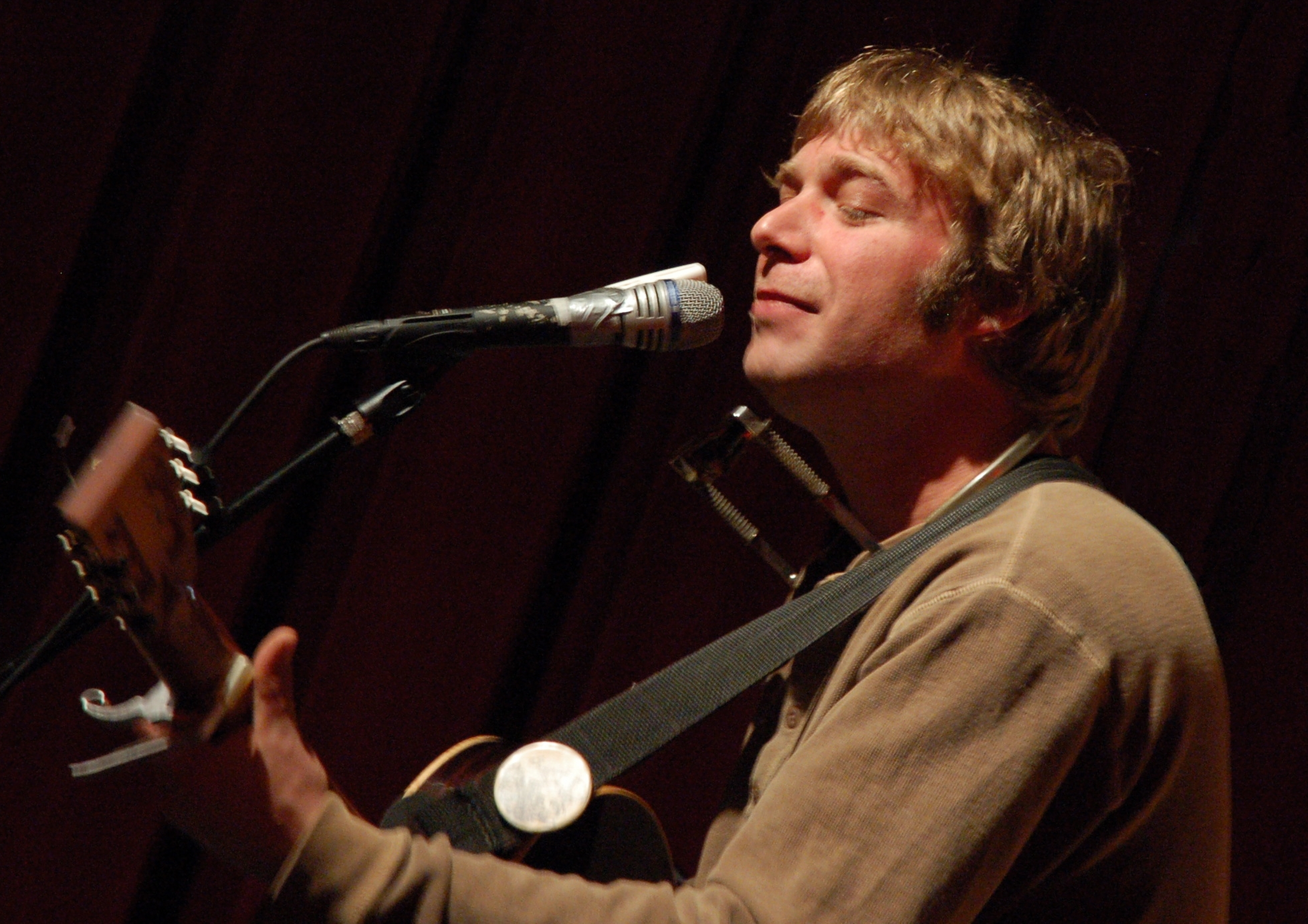
- Moore performing in Providence, Rhode Island, on March 31, 2008.

Background information
- Also known as: Percy Boyd
- Born: October 12, 1970 (age 55); Clifton Forge, Virginia
- Origin: Staunton, Virginia, U.S.
- Genres: Folk, jam band
- Occupations: Musician, singer-songwriter, entrepreneur
- Instruments: Guitar, harmonica
- Years active: 1993–present
- Label: Frogville Records
- Website: nathansland.com

Nathan Moore (born October 12, 1970), also known as Percy Boyd, is an American folk music guitarist and singer-songwriter best known for being a founding member of both ThaMuseMeant and Surprise Me Mr. Davis. Moore has also released numerous solo albums on Frogville Records, an independent record company he co-founded with John Treadwell. A prolific songwriter, Moore has written over one thousand songs. In June 2008, Moore won the prestigious Telluride Bluegrass Festival Troubadour Competition, performing for 10,000 festival goers and winning a custom made guitar.

His most recent project (2017) is called The Whole Other, featuring Nathan's songs and sounds on an electronic backdrop, partnered with multi-instrumentalist and collaborator Lex Park.

== Biography ==
=== Surprise Me Mr. Davis ===
Surprise Me Mr. Davis is an electro-folk band consisting of Nathan Moore and the members of avant-rock band The Slip. They formed in 2003 in Boston while Moore was visiting The Slip at their apartment and the Blizzard of 2003 hit. When they were snowed in, Moore and The Slip spent the time playing with home recording equipment, the result eventually becoming their self-titled album. During the period in which they were snowed in, the band members would ask each other what they should play on their instruments. The typical answer soon became "Surprise me". Toward the end of the week, Nathan Moore received a message on his cell phone from the voice of an elderly lady with a rich accent saying, "Mister Davis, you're having fun with that recording!" It was a wrong number, but the band decided to merge "Surprise Me." and "Mister Davis", thus making the official band name Surprise Me Mr. Davis. In the winter of 2004, the band toured for the first time in the Northeast. The clubs they played included the Tin Cup in Philadelphia, Savannah's in Albany, New York, and Eclipse Theater in Waitsfield, Vermont. In March and April 2005, they again played a Northeast tour. Later that year in November, they played a California tour, hitting clubs such as The Independent in San Francisco, Sweetwater in Mill Valley, California, Moe's Alley in Santa Cruz, and Winston's in San Diego. They have also played High Sierra Music Festival every year since forming. At the 2006, 2007, 2008, 2009 and 2010 High Sierra Music Festival, they played surprise late night shows at Camp Harry. Keyboardist Marco Benevento joined the band in 2009.

=== 2007: In His Own Worlds ===
Moore's seventh solo effort, In His Own Worlds, was released on Frogville Records on June 27, 2008. Moore picked the title of the album by weeding out all other "bad" choices, and settled on one that used wordplay, although Moore stated that "it doesn't seem to be the best marketing angle in America." In a 2007 feature article with JamBase, Moore explained how his religion influenced the making of the album:

There's hypocrisy with the religious community waging these wars and damaging the environment that made me want to pull the Jesus I knew up. The Jesus I know is completely against these wars and the use of fossil fuels. The Jesus I know would never be in favor of these things. On [In His Own Worlds] I wanted him to be there in the room, to invite Jesus into the conversation, hopefully as tactfully as possible.

Contemporary music critics responded positively to In His Own Worlds. Dennis Cook of JamBase called the album "brilliant", and said that the album was "Nathan Moore at his best, which is saying something."

=== Songwriting ===
For Moore songwriting is "...a very elusive and mysterious thing to talk about...You feel like people saying they feel like they're a conduit, that something is passing through them. I wouldn't necessarily say that that's true, but it does feel like that."

"The sharp, introspective lyrics of Nathan Moore draw an instant connection to the great folk singers of the past." -Paste Magazine

"Nathan Moore…is one of the greatest songwriters we have and the faucet is always on pouring fresh songs out like water." Aaron Case- Jambase

"Moore has a timeless sound that falls easily into place next to those hollowed names that came before him – Seeger, Havens, and Dylan." - AmericanaUK

== Discography ==
=== Solo ===
- 1999: Single Wide
- 2002: Percy Boyd's Lost Tracks
- 2002: Live at the Blackfriars Playhouse
- 2002: Sad Songs Make Me Happy
- 2003: Other Wise Blue Skies
- 2003: Cans 'n' Can'ts
- 2007: In His Own Worlds
- 2008: You Yeah Smokin' Hot
- 2009: Folk Singer (EP)
- 2011: Dear Puppeteer
- 2013: Hippy Fiasco Rides Again
- 2014: Dandelion Killers
- 2015: Enough About Me
- 2016: Goodbye America
- 2017: The Whole Other
- 2021: Holler & Hope

=== With Surprise Me Mr. Davis ===
- 2004: Surprise Me Mr. Davis
- 2005: Only in Montreal
- 2010: That Man Eats Morning For Breakfast

=== With ThaMuseMeant ===
- 1995: Live at the Mineshaft Tavern
- 1997: Breakfast Epiphanies
- 1998: Sweet Things
- 2000: Grow Your Own
- 2001: Nudes
- 2004: Silver Seed
- 2006: Never Settle for Less
