= Sonya Kitchell =

American singer-songwriter (born 1989)

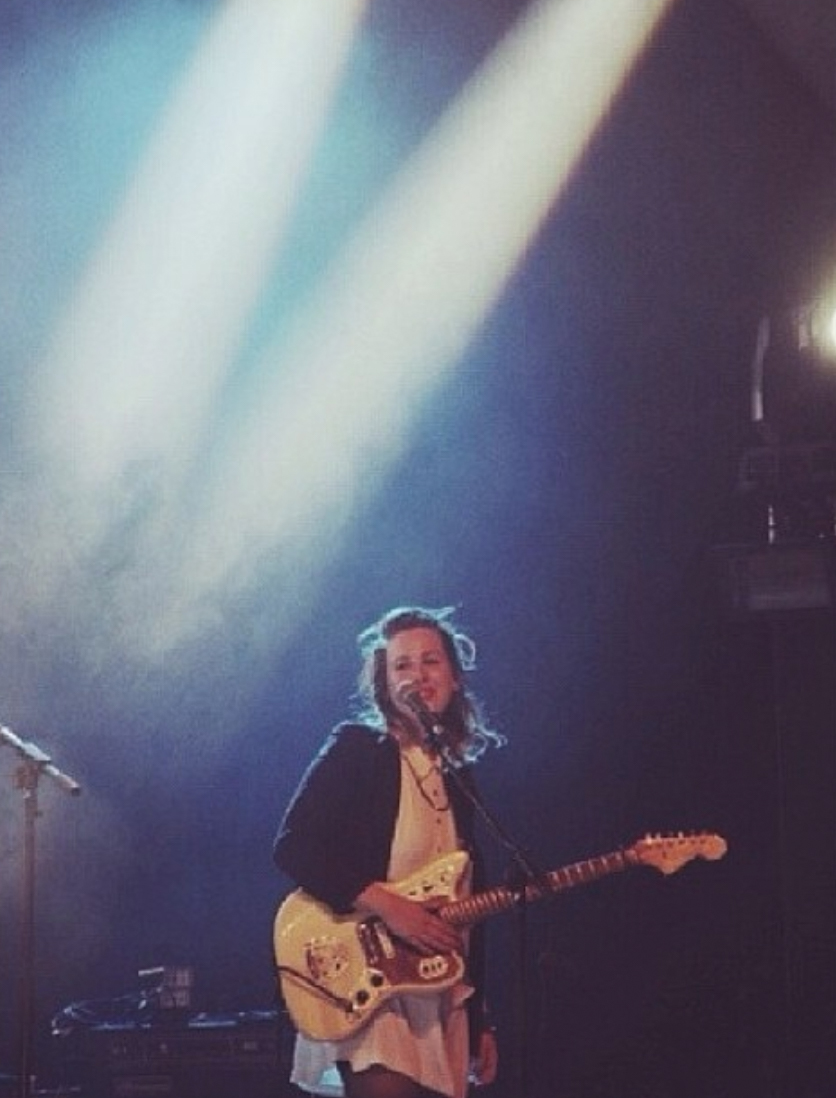
- Kitchell performing in 2016.

Background information
- Birth name: Sonya Kitchell
- Born: March 1, 1989 (age 36); Northampton, Massachusetts
- Genres: Indie folk
- Occupation: Musician
- Years active: 2005–present
- Labels: Unsigned
- Website: http://www.sonyakitchell.com

Sonya Kitchell (born March 1, 1989, in Ashfield, MA) is an American singer-songwriter. Kitchell formed her first band and began writing music in 2001. In 2004, she signed with Velour Records and was named the second Starbucks Hear Music Artist, releasing her first international-selling record, Words Came Back to Me on Velour Records. She has toured globally to Japan, Europe and across the U.S. many times in support of the album.

Kitchell has appeared on numerous late-night TV shows, including the Late Show with David Letterman, The Late Late Show with Craig Ferguson, CNN, CBS and garnered rave reviews from the LA Times, Boston Globe, NY Times and NPR. She has appeared in venues such as Carnegie Hall and The Hollywood Bowl, amongst numerous notable stages around the world. In 2007 she joined forces with Herbie Hancock, singing on his Grammy-winning Joni Mitchell tribute titled River: The Joni Letters. Hancock invited Kitchell to join him on tour, to sing in his band, in support of the record for the following year. That gave her the chance to work alongside such notables as Wayne Shorter, Joni Mitchell, Milton Nascimento, Chaka Khan, Quincy Jones, and many more.

Shortly after her year spent touring with Hancock, Kitchell released her second album This Storm in 2008 on Decca Records, produced by Malcolm Burn, in collaboration with renowned rock band, The Slip, to much critical acclaim.

In 2009, Kitchell joined forces with long-time friend and collaborator Garth Stevenson, and together they created a collection of string-quartet based music. The album Convict of Conviction was released in 2010, produced by Stewart Lerman. Over the next year Kitchell explored a more dramatic, cinematic side to her music performing as Sonya Kitchell & The Brooklyn Strings.

Her songs have appeared on numerous TV shows and films including Perfect Stranger, Private Practice and The Unit.

She lives in Brooklyn, NY and released her latest self-produced album We Come Apart in partnership with Thirty Tigers and the Rockwood Music Hall in January 2016.

Kitchell joined forces with Neal Evans to create a musical duo called +Co. They released one album, Strange Symphony on September 13, 2020.

== Personal life ==
Kitchell was born in Massachusetts and grew up in Ashfield, Massachusetts.

She is the daughter of photographer/artist Peter Kitchell and illustrator Gayle Kabaker and has a younger brother, Max Kitchell.

== Discography ==
- Cold Day EP (Velour Recordings, 2005)
- Words Came Back to Me (Velour Recordings, 2006)
- This Storm (Decca Records, 2008)
- Convict of Conviction (429 Records, 2010)
- We Come Apart (Relativity Media, 2016)
- Strange Symphony (by +Co (Sonya Kitchell & Neal Evans)) (Wilder Records, 2020)
