= This Storm (album) =

Studio album by Sonya Kitchell
- Released: September 2, 2008
- Genre: Rock, Jazz
- Length: 45:27
- Label: Decca
- Producer: Malcolm Burn

Sonya Kitchell chronology
Words Came Back to Me (2006)	This Storm (2008)	Convict of Conviction (2010)

Professional ratings
Review scores
Source	Rating
AllMusic	4/5 stars
Entertainment Weekly	A−
The Saginaw News	4/5 stars
Slant	3.5/5 stars

This Storm is the second full-length album by Sonya Kitchell. Kitchell was only 17 when she made this album. J. Poet of AllMusic writes that "This Storm is an album of rare warmth and beauty, with a bright pop pulse that heralds Kitchell as a superlative new talent."

== Track listing ==
All tracks are written by Sonya Kitchell, unless otherwise noted.

No.	Title	Writer(s)	Length
1.	"For Every Drop"	Sonya Kitchell; Mike Daly; Erin McKeown	3:28
2.	"Borderline"		3:07
3.	"Running"	Kitchell; Malcolm Burn	3:47
4.	"Here To There"		3:19
5.	"Walk Away"		3:07
6.	"Fire"		4:20
7.	"Soldier's Lament"		2:38
8.	"Robin In The Snow"		4:59
9.	"Who Knows After All"		4:38
10.	"Effortless"		4:15
11.	"So Lonely"		4:04
12.	"This Storm"		3:45
Total length:			45:27

- Track information and credits were taken from the album's liner notes.
