= George Hewison =

Canadian singer and trade unionist (born 1944)

General Secretary of the Communist Party of Canada
- In office 1988–1992
- Preceded by: William Kashtan
- Succeeded by: Miguel Figueroa

Personal details
- Born: 1944 (age 81–82) Campbell River, British Columbia
- Party: Communist (1953–1992)
- Occupation: Singer, trade unionist
- Website: www.georgehewison.ca

George Hewison (born 1944) is a Canadian folk singer, trade unionist and former politician. He was formerly a long-time member of the Communist Party of Canada and served as the party's general secretary from 1988 to 1992.

== Early life ==
Hewison's father, "Jack" Hewison, immigrated to Canada from Scotland and settled in Campbell River, British Columbia, where he worked as a fisherman and became secretary of his union local. He was a founding member of the Co-operative Commonwealth Federation but became disillusioned with the CCF during the Cold War. He joined the Labor-Progressive Party (as the Communist Party was known) in 1953 after CCF leaders supported a raid by Hal Banks and the Seafarers International Union against Hewison's union, the United Fishermen and Allied Workers' Union. Prior to the raid, the UFAWU had been expelled from the Trades and Labour Congress of Canada because of its Communist leadership.

Hewison grew up in Campbell River, British Columbia, selling the party press and joined the Communist Party and the fishermen's union at the age of 17. He grew up in a musical family before television and made his first public performance when his voice changed from soprano to bass in 1960. In addition to his labour and political activism, Hewison has always seen music as an essential part of his life.

== Trade unionism ==
In 1965 he became a full-time organizer for his union and in 1973, Hewison was elected business agent for the United Fishermen and Allied Workers Union in British Columbia, and became the union's secretary-treasurer in 1977, remaining in the position until 1985 when he left the union to move to Toronto to become the labour secretary on the Communist Party's Central Executive Committee.

While an officer of his union, Hewison represented west coast fishermen in bilateral government to government negotiations with the United States on boundary and fisheries issues. He headed many lobbies to the provincial and nation's capital. As Vice President of the Vancouver and District Labour Council, he initiated the massive resistance to the 26 pieces of legislation brought forward by the British Columbia Social Credit Party government in 1983 that later evolved into "Operation Solidarity". Throughout this period, he continued to use his voice and guitar as his favourite tools to advance the interests of working people.

== General Secretary of the CPC ==
Hewison succeeded William Kashtan as general secretary of the Communist Party of Canada in 1988 at a time when the Communist world was being convulsed by Mikhail Gorbachev's reforms in the Soviet Union. He was leader of the Canadian party when the USSR and the Soviet bloc collapsed. The Communist Party of Canada had long been relatively uncritical supporters of Moscow, not least Hewison himself, and was severely disoriented by the collapse of Soviet Communism in Eastern Europe. As a major discussion about the causes for the collapse of the Soviet Union and the significance for Communists in Canada and internationally opened, the leadership of the party under Hewison's leadership began to increasingly question the legacy of Stalinism within the Party. The group was eventually challenged by a pro-Leninist faction, led by previous leader William Kashtan and future leaders Miguel Figueroa and Elizabeth Rowley among others, who accused him of "revisionism."

Hewison was unanimously re-elected leader at the party's next convention in 1992 which produced a new manifesto called "Communists and the New Decade" (1990s) and the slogan "Its a good time to be a communist". A critical faction, however, was also elected by convention to the Party's Central Committee, but were defeated in elections to top positions in the Party. They nevertheless continued to resist the direction the Hewison leadership was heading, which was opposed by a significant number of the Party membership especially in the Atlantic, Ontario, Manitoba and British Columbia, with Hewison's main supporters in Quebec and Alberta.

== Party split ==
Long-standing financial support from the Soviet Union to the Communist Party of Canada was discontinued, and later other business arrangements such as cultural-exchange deals from which the Party benefited helped created financial pressures on the party in terms of its ability to continue to finance a large staff, headquarters, maintain a print shop, a publishing house and two weekly newspapers (Canadian Tribune and Pacific Tribune). The leadership led by Hewison argued the Party was in financial crisis.

As the confrontation exploded in the Party, the pro-Leninist faction (led by Elizabeth Rowley) forced the Hewison group into court. Meanwhile the provincial conventions of the CPC in BC, Manitoba and Ontario voted out the Hewison leadership. After strained years for the CPC an out-of-court settlement took place between the two sides, in which Hewison and his supporters surrendered the Party's name, but not the newspaper.

In the meantime, hundreds of party activists, frustrated with the paralytic debate between the factions, had left the party. During the inner-party crisis, the membership dropped from almost 2000 to about 800, losing many links with organized labour as well as the entire Party in Quebec and much of the Party organization in Alberta. The out-of-court settlement also mandated the splitting of the old party's assets, with the out-going leadership undertaking to leave the Communist Party. The Canadian Tribune and the Cecil-Ross Society (a society with strict injunctions on use of funds) were allotted to the group around Hewison. Those funds were allocated according to the rules of the Societies Act.

== Cecil-Ross Society and musical career ==
The Cecil-Ross Society leadership which left the party, as their critics had alleged, attempted to broaden the appeal for their press by dropping their previous ideological "baggage" and included other socialists. For a variety of reasons, the New Times, which was meant to be a broad left periodical, failed after only two issues. The Cecil-Ross Society in British Columbia also attempted to publish another magazine, Ginger, but it failed as well. Within a few years, the group folded and the remaining funds from the group were dispensed to the constituent parts throughout Canada.

Today, Hewison continues to play a role in the labour and progressive movements for which he was a part for half a century. He was recently honoured as a "Pioneer of Labour" by the Peterborough and District Labour Council. He has continued to link music with labour and social activism and is the founder and lead singer of the "Rank n File Band", created by the Canadian Auto Workers union. He has produced five albums over a fifty years span, and has written scores of songs for, and performed at, conventions of virtually every major labour organization in the country.

Hewison has toured extensively and most recently performed at the Illawarra Folk Festival in Australia and the Mariposa Folk Festival and Miners Memorial weekend in Canada as well at Joe Hill's birthplace in Gavle in Sweden. He has also performed and recorded with "Joe Hill" composer, Earl Robinson. His latest album is entitled "Uncharted Waters". He also continues to study contemporary capitalism and conducts classes in political economy, blogging on his website.

== Electoral record ==
1988 Canadian federal election: Davenport
Party	Candidate	Votes	%	±%
Liberal	Charles Caccia	16,436	58.9	+5.2
New Democratic	Anna Menozzi	5,243	18.8	-3.7
Progressive Conservative	Alex Franco	5,179	18.6	-2.6
Libertarian	April Henderson	480	1.7	+0.7
Rhinoceros	Barry Heidt	214	0.8	
Communist	George P. Hewison	196	0.7	0.0
Independent	Heather Robertson	150	0.5	
Total valid votes		27,898	100.0	
