= Canadian House of Commons Standing Committee on Citizenship and Immigration =

Standing committee of the House of Commons of Canada

The Standing Committee on Citizenship and Immigration (CIMM) is a standing committee of the Canadian House of Commons that studies issues related to citizenship and immigration in Canada.

It has oversight of Immigration, Refugees and Citizenship Canada and the Immigration and Refugee Board of Canada, as well as monitoring federal policy related to multiculturalism.

== Mandate ==
CIMM examines orders of reference that the House refers to it, which can include those relating to bills, as well as proposed regulations under Section 5 of the Immigration and Refugee Protection Act, and under Section 27.1 of the Citizenship Act.

CIMM studies and reports on all matters relating to the mandate, management, and operation of Immigration, Refugees and Citizenship Canada (IRCC) and the Immigration and Refugee Board of Canada (IRB), including, among others, statute law; backlogs of immigration applications; the program and policy objectives of either organization, and their effectiveness in implementing their objectives; review of either organization's relative success.

In July 2013, CIMM also began taking on certain matters related to Passport Canada, which transferred to IRCC from the Department of Foreign Affairs. The committee was once mandated to monitor the implementation of the federal multiculturalism policy throughout the Canadian Government. However, implementation of the Canadian Multiculturalism Act became the responsibility of the Minister of Canadian Heritage in 2015, after being in the Minister of Citizenship and Immigration's portfolio since 2008. Since 2015, the Standing Committee on Canadian Heritage has taken on matters related to such policy.

== Membership ==
As of the 45th Canadian Parliament:

| Party | Member | District |
|---|---|---|
| Liberal | Julie Dzerowicz, chair | Davenport, ON |
| Conservative | Michelle Rempel Garner, vice chair | Calgary Nose Hill, AB |
| Bloc Québécois | Alexis Brunelle-Duceppe, vice chair | Lac-Saint-Jean, QC |
| Liberal | Peter Fragiskatos | London Centre, ON |
| Liberal | Michael Ma | Markham—Unionville, ON |
| Conservative | Costas Menegakis | Aurora—Oak Ridges—Richmond Hill, ON |
| Conservative | Brad Redekopp | Saskatoon West, SK |
| Liberal | Amandeep Sodhi | Brampton Centre, ON |
| Liberal | Salma Zahid | Scarborough Centre—Don Valley East, ON |
| Liberal | Sameer Zuberi | Pierrefonds—Dollard, QC |

== Subcommittees ==
- Subcommittee on Agenda and Procedure (SCIM)
