= Little Portugal, Toronto =

Little Portugal
- Neighbourhood
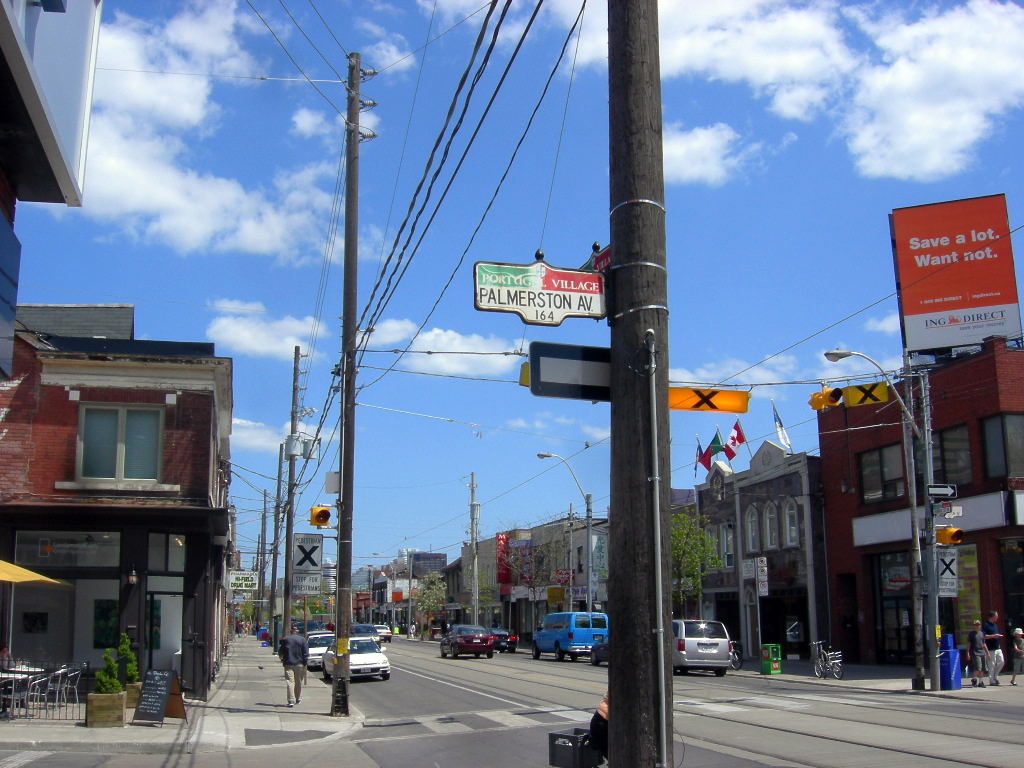
- Street view of Little Portugal, Toronto.

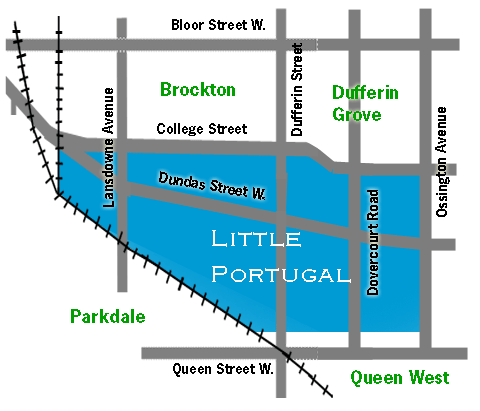

- Location within Toronto
- Coordinates: 43°39′00″N 79°26′08″W
- Country: Canada
- Province: Ontario
- City: Toronto
- Annexed: 1884 into City of Toronto

Government
  - City Councillor: Alejandra Bravo (Ward 9); Dianne Saxe (Ward 11)
  - Federal M.P.: Julie Dzerowicz (Davenport); Danielle Martin (University-Rosedale)
  - Provincial M.P.P.: Marit Stiles (Davenport); Jessica Bell (University-Rosedale)

Little Portugal (also known as Portugal Village; Portuguese: Pequeno Portugal or, Aldeia Portugal) is a neighbourhood and ethnic enclave in Toronto, Ontario, Canada. It is located west of downtown in the "Old" City of Toronto. It is bound on the west by Lansdowne Avenue, on the north by College Street, on the east by Ossington Avenue and on the south by the GO Transit and Union Pearson Express railway tracks. The area is mainly residential, with Portuguese businesses along Dundas Street West and College Street. The area west of Dufferin Street was a part of the former Town of Brockton. The sub area bounded by Dufferin Street on the west, Dundas Street on the north, Ossington Avenue on the east and Queen Street on the south is also known as "Beaconsfield Village" dating back to the days of the sub-division of lots in the area around Beaconsfield Avenue, named after British Prime Minister Benjamin Disraeli who given the title Lord Beaconsfield by Queen Victoria.

== Character ==
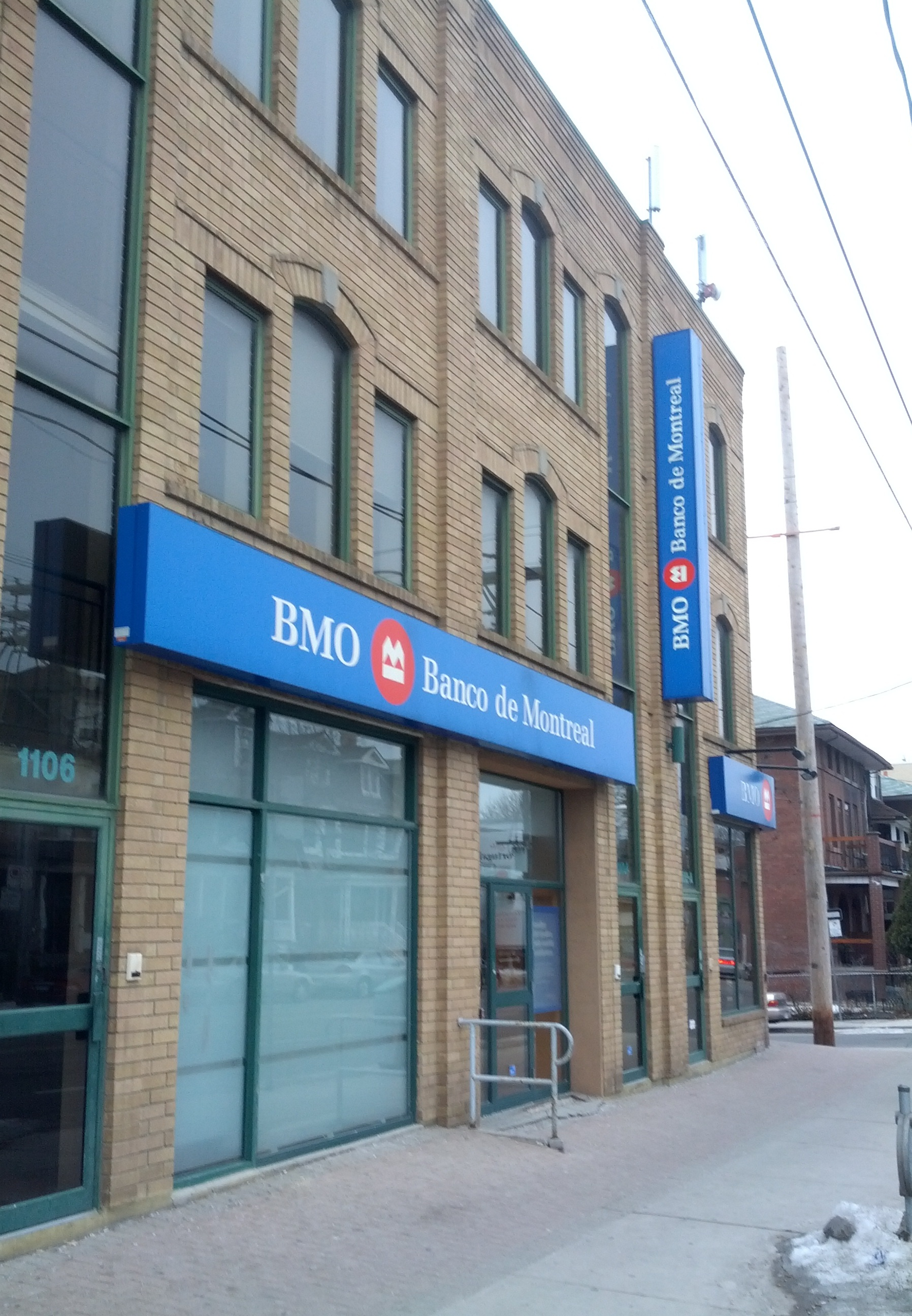
Portuguese signs at a Bank of Montreal branch in Little Portugal. The area is home to a number of Portuguese stores along College and Dundas Street.

Little Portugal is predominantly a residential area. The largest ethnic group are Portuguese and numbers of Portuguese storefronts are located along College and Dundas Streets, giving the area its name. There is a fine stock of mid-century homes.

A major hub of activity in the area today is McCormick Park, home to McCormick Recreation Centre and Arena on Brock Avenue. This area has long been a focal point for youth living in the area.

The area once was home to Ideal Bread Company, which operated a bakery at 183 Dovercourt Road from 1919 to 1957 and marketed Wonder Bread in Canada from 1934 to 1940. Since 2007 the former bread factory is now a residential complex known as Argyle Lofts.

Today, Little Portugal is home to Do West Fest, one of Toronto's many summertime street festivals. Do West Fest is an "annual celebration of music, arts, food, fun, and community takes place along Dundas Street West, from Ossington Avenue to Lansdowne Avenue, covering 16 blocks of downtown Toronto". In 2024, the festival drew an attendance of 750,000 people over its 3-day schedule.

== Demographics ==
The area has many residents of Portuguese and more recently Brazilian backgrounds. The second largest language group used after Portuguese are Chinese, Spanish, and Vietnamese. Above 50% of the population in Little Portugal identify as Portuguese.

As of 2016 the neighbourhood houses a population of 15,559. Little Portugal is a fast growing neighbourhood: in the years 2011–2016 the area's population grew by 29.1%, a significantly higher growth rate than the 4.5% population growth seen throughout the entire city over the same period of time. Little Portugal has a population density of 12,859 people per km^{2}.

== Transportation ==
The area is well-served by the TTC. There are the 505 and 506 streetcar lines along Dundas and College. There are north–south bus lines on Lansdowne (47), Dufferin (29, 929), and Ossington (63).

=== Main streets ===
Dundas Street West is a four-lane east–west arterial road running through the centre of the neighbourhood. From Ossington Avenue west the street is known as Rua Açores. There are storefronts along most of the street and are primarily local businesses. College Street West is a four-lane arterial road approximately a quarter-mile north of Dundas meeting Dundas at its western end just west of Lansdowne Avenue. It has storefronts along most of its length. College Street has several areas of Portuguese restaurants and bars east and west of Dufferin Avenue.

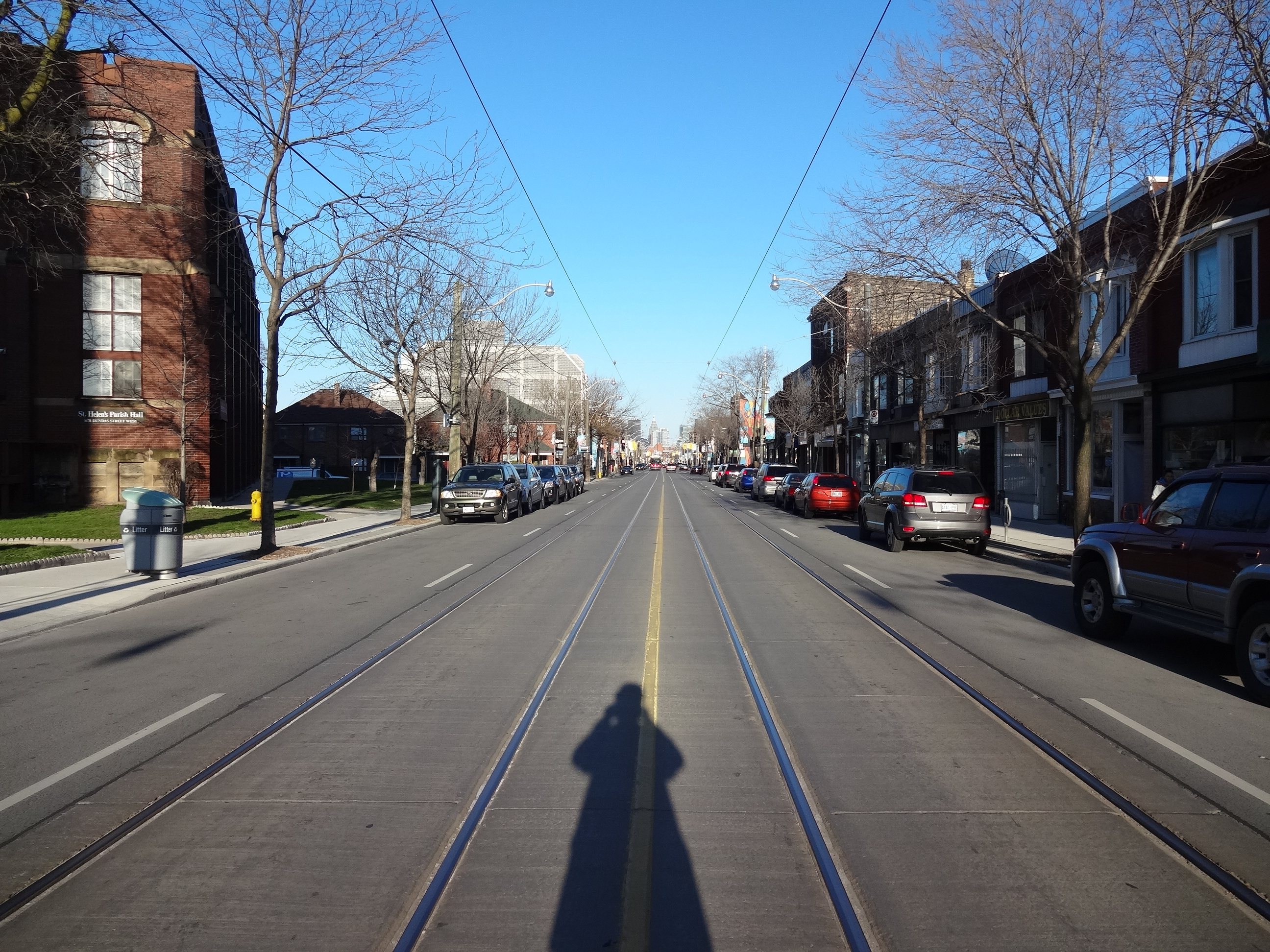
Dundas Street is a major four-lane east–west road running through the centre of the neighbourhood.

In 2006, the businesses on Dundas Street from the CNR tracks on the west to Rusholme Road on the east organized the 'Dundas West Business Improvement Area.' In 2007, the 'Little Portugal Business Improvement Area' was formed for the stretch of businesses along Dundas Street from Rusholme Road (just east of Dufferin) to Roxton Road (one block east of Ossington) on the east.

== Schools ==
- Shirley Street Public School - Junior Elementary
- City View - Alternative Senior School
- Alexander Muir/Gladstone Avenue Public - Junior and Senior Elementary
- The Grove Community School - Alternative Elementary School
- St. Helen's Catholic School - Catholic Elementary School
- Ossington/Old Orchard - Junior Public School
