= Business agent =

A business agent may refer to:

- A business manager
- Business agent (labor), a representative of a labor union local (North America)
