= Julie Dzerowicz =

Canadian Liberal politician

Julie Dzerowicz MP
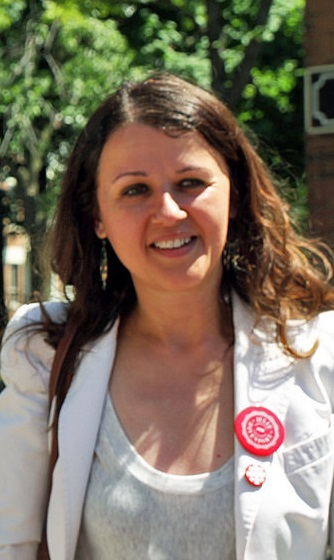

Member of Parliament for Davenport
- Incumbent
- Assumed office October 19, 2015
- Preceded by: Andrew Cash

Personal details
- Born: Toronto, Ontario, Canada
- Party: Liberal
- Education: McGill University (BCom); University of British Columbia (MBA)

Juliana Roma Dzerowicz (/ˈdzɛrəwɪts/) is a Canadian politician who has been the member of Parliament (MP) for Davenport since 2015. A member of the Liberal Party, Dzerowicz is the chair of the Standing Committee on Citizenship and Immigration, chair of Canada-NATO Parliamentary Association, and as the chair of the Toronto Liberal Caucus of MPs. She is a member of the NATO Parliamentary Assembly and serves as one of its vice presidents.

== Early life and education ==
Dzerowicz was born in Toronto, Ontario, to a Ukrainian father and a Mexican mother, Maria Amparo Lizarraga Zataran, from Recodo. She graduated from McGill University with a Bachelor of Commerce in 1994. She completed her final term at Institut Commercial de Nancy in France. Dzerowicz was heavily involved in leadership roles at McGill, and served as the vice-president internal of the Students' Society of McGill University.

She received the Scarlet Key Award in 1994, which is awarded to "students who have demonstrated indubitable qualities of leadership, unselfishness and perseverance by their outstanding contributions to the McGill community."

After completing a Master of Business Administration at the University of British Columbia (UBC), where she served on the UBC Senate, Dzerowicz finished her degree at the London Business School.

== Career ==
=== Pre-2015 ===
Prior to seeking elected office, Dzerowicz worked in both the public service and the private sector. In the Ontario government, she served for approximately four years as a senior policy adviser, and in 2011 she worked as a chief of staff.

She spent more than two decades in senior roles in investment banking, commercial banking, and biotechnology; while at the Bank of Montreal she contributed to the development and launch of Canada’s email money transfer service.

In 2010, she co-founded Project Neutral, a Toronto non-profit that helps neighbourhoods measure and reduce carbon emissions. She was also a founding board member of JUMP Math, a Canadian charity promoting numeracy education.

Dzerowicz was Vice-Chair of the Ontario Liberal Party’s 2011 platform committee.

=== As a Member of Parliament ===
After a lengthy nomination process in 2015, Dzerowicz successfully secured the Liberal Party of Canada's nomination as the Liberal candidate in the riding of Davenport. In October 2015, she became the first female Member of Parliament for Davenport.

In 2017, Dzerowicz introduced Private Member’s Motion M-126 calling on the House of Commons to recognize the contributions of Portuguese Canadians and to designate June 10 as Portugal Day and the month of June as Portuguese Heritage Month; the motion was adopted by the House.

In February 2021, Dzerowicz introduced a private member's bill, Bill C-273, into the House of Commons of Canada calling upon the Minister of Finance to develop a national strategy for a guaranteed basic income.

In June 2021, Dzerowicz invited constituents to ask her questions via the Reddit discussion website. During the online conversation she was criticized for wrongly stating on Twitter that the 2020 Port of Montreal strike had lasted 2.5 years, and for another tweet in which The Hill Times stated she was mocking a constituent who asked about the Canadian government's legal fight with survivors of Canada's residential school system. Dzerowicz's calls for more funding for affordable housing and universal basic income were better received. Dzerowicz did not answer questions about the Canadian Radio-television and Telecommunications Commission wholesale internet rates or the government's change of policy away from electoral reform.

Following the 2021 Canadian Federal Election, Dzerowicz was re-elected to represent Davenport. A judicial recount was initiated by Elections Canada, at the request of the New Democratic Party (NDP) because of the margin of victory was under 100 votes over the NDP's Alejandra Bravo. With the recount in progress, it became obvious that Dzerowicz won by 76 votes and the recount was stopped soon after it started.

In December 2021, Dzerowicz, acting as the chair of the Liberal Immigration caucus, responded to criticism from within her own party about delays to processing immigration claims, stating that work needs to be done and committing to future improvements.

In March 2024, Dzerowicz broke ranks with her party by calling for an arms embargo on Israel, citing calls from constituents and a February 23 statement from the Office of the United Nations High Commissioner for Human Rights, which warned that arms exports to Israel could violate international humanitarian law if used in Gaza. She stressed the need to protect innocent Palestinian civilians.

In June 2024, Dzerowicz’s office in Davenport was vandalized with red paint, and the words “Rafah is burning, Toronto will too” were spray-painted on the building.

In the 2025 Canadian federal election, Dzerowicz was re-elected as Member of Parliament for Davenport, receiving 35,364 votes (57.8 per cent), defeating candidates from the Conservative Party and the New Democratic Party.

Dzerowicz participated in the 71st Annual Session of the NATO Parliamentary Assembly in Ljubljana, where she questioned NATO Secretary General Mark Rutte on the application of Article 5 in the context of hybrid and cyber warfare.

As Chair of the Federal Toronto Liberal Caucus, Dzerowicz publicly supported Toronto’s bid to host the proposed Defence, Security and Resilience Bank.

== Electoral record ==
2025 Canadian federal election: Davenport
| Party | Candidate | Votes | % | ±% | Expenditures |
|---|---|---|---|---|---|
| Liberal | Julie Dzerowicz | 35,364 | 57.81 | +14.21 | $116,592.71 |
| Conservative | Francis Lavoie | 14,189 | 23.19 | +12.34 | $7,189.92 |
| New Democratic | Sandra Sousa | 10,452 | 17.09 | –22.48 | $121.638.04 |
| Green | Lilian Barrera | 782 | 1.28 | –1.12 | $0.00 |
| Communist | Dave McKee | 387 | 0.63 | N/A | $0.00 |
| Total valid votes/expense limit | | 61,174 | 65.93 | – | $138,313.21 |
| Total rejected ballots | | 528 | | | |
| Turnout | | 61,174 | 65.91 | | |
| Eligible voters | | 92,792 | | | |
| Liberal notional hold | | Swing | | +0.94 | |
Source: Elections Canada

2021 Canadian federal election: Davenport
| Party | Candidate | Votes | % | ±% | Expenditures |
|---|---|---|---|---|---|
| Liberal | Julie Dzerowicz | 19,930 | 42.13 | -1.59 | $101,254.58 |
| New Democratic | Alejandra Bravo | 19,854 | 41.97 | +0.95 | $102,816.01 |
| Conservative | Jenny Kalimbet | 4,774 | 10.09 | +0.84 | $6,403.32 |
| People's | Tara Dos Remedios | 1,499 | 3.17 | +2.24 | $3,001.04 |
| Green | Adrian Currie | 1,087 | 2.30 | -2.21 | $14,660.32 |
| Independent | Troy Young | 86 | 0.18 | | none listed |
| Independent | Chai Kalevar | 77 | 0.16 | +0.01 | none listed |
| Total valid votes/expense limit | | 47,307 | 99.10 | – | $109,525.37 |
| Total rejected ballots | | 429 | 0.90 | +0.12 | |
| Turnout | | 47,736 | 61.07 | -4.26 | |
| Eligible voters | | 78,167 | | | |
Source: Elections Canada

2019 Canadian federal election: Davenport
| Party | Candidate | Votes | % | ±% | Expenditures |
|---|---|---|---|---|---|
| Liberal | Julie Dzerowicz | 22,813 | 43.6 | -0.66 | $92,294.42 |
| New Democratic | Andrew Cash | 21,341 | 40.8 | -0.56 | none listed |
| Conservative | Sanjay Bhatia | 5,014 | 9.6 | -0.95 | $35,793.71 |
| Green | Hannah Conover-Arthurs | 2,341 | 4.5 | +1.41 | none listed |
| People's | Francesco Ciardullo | 492 | 0.9 | - | none listed |
| Communist | Elizabeth Rowley | 137 | 0.3 | -0.23 | $626.70 |
| Independent | Troy Young | 85 | 0.2 | - | none listed |
| Independent | Chai Kalevar | 80 | 0.2 | -0.02 | $1,610.25 |
| Total valid votes/expense limit | | 52,303 | 100.0 | | |
| Total rejected ballots | | | | | |
| Turnout | | | | | |
| Eligible voters | | 79,822 | | | |
| Liberal hold | | Swing | | -0.05 | |
Source: Elections Canada

2015 Canadian federal election: Davenport
| Party | Candidate | Votes | % | ±% | Expenditures |
|---|---|---|---|---|---|
| Liberal | Julie Dzerowicz | 21,947 | 44.26 | +16.36 | $81,434.76 |
| New Democratic | Andrew Cash | 20,506 | 41.36 | -12.36 | $113,630.62 |
| Conservative | Carlos Oliveira | 5,233 | 10.55 | -3.67 | $8,821.20 |
| Green | Dan Stein | 1,530 | 3.09 | -0.33 | $8,434.06 |
| Communist | Miguel Figueroa | 261 | 0.53 | – | – |
| Independent | Chai Kalevar | 107 | 0.22 | – | $1,430.00 |
| Total valid votes/expense limit | | 49,584 | 100.00 | | $205,012.65 |
| Total rejected ballots | | 287 | 0.58 | – | |
| Turnout | | 49,871 | 69.19 | – | |
| Eligible voters | | 72,082 | | | |
| Liberal gain from New Democratic | | Swing | | +14.36 | |
Source: Elections Canada
