= Walter L. Gordon =

Canadian politician

The Honourable Walter L. Gordon PC CC CBE
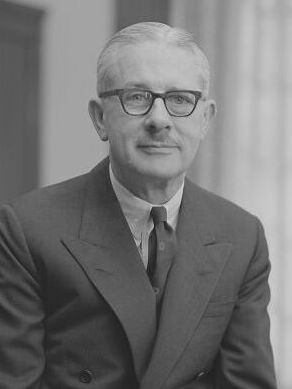
- Gordon, c. 1964

President of the Privy Council
- In office 4 April 1967 – 10 March 1968
- Prime Minister: Lester B. Pearson
- Preceded by: Guy Favreau
- Succeeded by: Pierre Trudeau (Acting)

Minister without portfolio
- In office 9 January 1967 – 3 April 1967
- Prime Minister: Lester B. Pearson

Minister of Finance
- In office 22 April 1963 – 10 November 1965
- Prime Minister: Lester B. Pearson
- Preceded by: George Nowlan
- Succeeded by: Mitchell Sharp

Member of Parliament for Davenport
- In office 18 June 1962 – 24 June 1968
- Preceded by: Douglas Morton
- Succeeded by: Charles Caccia

Personal details
- Born: Walter Lockhart Gordon; 27 January 1906 Toronto, Ontario, Canada
- Died: 21 March 1987 (aged 81) Toronto, Ontario, Canada
- Party: Liberal
- Spouse: Elizabeth Counsell (m. 1932)
- Children: 3
- Relatives: Charles Drury (brother-in-law)
- Profession: Accountant

Walter Lockhart Gordon PC CC CBE (27 January 1906 – 21 March 1987) was a Canadian accountant, businessman, politician, and writer.

== Education ==
Born in Toronto, the son of Lieutenant-Colonel Harry Duncan Lockhart Gordon DSO, a prominent Toronto businessman, and Kathleen Cassels, daughter of the first President of the Exchequer Court of Canada Walter Cassels. Like his father, Gordon was educated at Upper Canada College and the Royal Military College of Canada in Kingston, Ontario.

== Public affairs involvement in early business career ==
Upon graduation and after a brief unhappy stint in New York, in January 1927 Gordon joined the accounting firm Clarkson, Gordon and Company, a prominent accountancy with roots to Upper Canada and the precursor to modern day EY Canada. The firm was at the time headed by Gordon's father (who became a name partner of the firm in 1913) and G.T. Clarkson, a grandson of the firm's founder Thomas Clarkson. He was a student there for four years, became a chartered accountant in early 1931.

In the mid-1930s, Gordon joined the ownership group of Canadian Forum, a political periodical with nationalist and progressive orientation, for about a year. He and his wife were close friend with its editor Graham Spry, and other leading members of the League for Social Reconstruction, an organization of left-leaning intellectuals.

Gordon's time at Clarkson Gordon provided him with extensive exposure to government machinery. G.T. Clarkson was a close personal associate of Ontario Conservative Premier Howard Ferguson, and the firm was regularly retained by the Ontario government in the 1920s, so much so that Gordon commented that there were times when he seemed to spend more time at Queen's Park than he did in the firm's office.

In 1934, Gordon Clarkson was retained by the Commons Committee on Price Spreads, and young Walter was assigned to work on the matter. He conducted an in-depth investigation into the merchandising and labour policies of the T. Eaton Company, produced a four-hundred-page report testified to the committee over five days. Through this committee he became friends with future Prime Minister Lester Pearson, then a young foreign service officer assigned to be commission secretary when the committee became a royal commission. Upon the completion of this prominent assignment, Gordon was promoted to be a partner of the firm in 1935.

At the outbreak of World War II, Gordon Clarkson was retained by the Bank of Canada in support of the formation of the Foreign Exchange Control Board, one of the boards established following Canada's declaration of war for regulation and control of economic activities. It was one of the first government assignments which Gordon served as the lead consultant from the firm, and later became chief of the board's examiners section(later renamed the Commercial Section).

In 1940 Gordon was invited by James Ilsley, one of the MPs on the price spread commission earlier who became finance minister that year, to join the finance department as someone with practical business experience. Gordon joined the department as a special assistant to Clifford Clark, the deputy minister of finance and one of the most influential Canadian public servants in the 20th century. Gordon's view of government was heavily influenced by Clark, Clark as Gordon saw Clark as "the dominating genius of the department and, in fact, of wartime Ottawa" and intellectually "the most exciting man" he had ever worked with.

In 1946, he chaired the Royal Commission on Administrative Classifications in the Public Service.

In 1947 Ontario Progressive Conservative Premier George Drew fired the chairman of the Hydro-Electric Power Commission of Ontario, and asked Gordon, a personal associate and squash partner of the Premier, to take on the job. Gordon declined the offer, but agreed to advise the commission on its restructuring and to recommend a new chair.

In 1948, Gordon was retained by federal defence minister Brooke Claxton to help decentralize the defence department and improve its efficiency. In 1949, he was retained by the federal government to report on the structure of the National Film Board.

== The beginnings of economic nationalism ==
From 1955 to 1957, Gordon chaired the Royal Commission on Canada's Economic Prospects. The commission's reports, issued in 1956 and 1957, expressed concern about growing foreign ownership in the Canadian economy, particularly in the resource sector, and made recommendations to redress the problem. The themes raised in the reports were revisited by Gordon in his government career.

According to Dr. Stephen Azzi, Walter Gordon is responsible for "New Nationalism" in Canada. This is the idea of supporting stronger ties with Great Britain, to prevent Canada being absorbed by United States.

== Political career ==
In the 1962 federal election, he was elected to the House of Commons of Canada as a Liberal. He was Minister of Finance from 1963 to 1965, during Prime Minister Lester Pearson's first minority government. Gordon's 1965 budget, which included an 11% tax on construction materials and manufacturing equipment, as well as the expansion of social programs, was attacked by the Opposition parties. Gordon persuaded Pearson to call the 1965 federal election and co-chaired the Liberal campaign. When the election failed to return a Liberal majority, Gordon, taking responsibility for giving the prime minister poor advice, resigned from Cabinet and returned to the backbench. In 1967, he returned to Cabinet as President of the Privy Council from 1967 to 1968. He was noted for his economic nationalism and his support for new social programs.

Gordon disagreed, often sharply, with Pearson over the significant expansion in federal expenditures and the decline of sound financial management in Pearson's second administration, which began in 1965. The long friendship between the two men, which had begun in the mid-1930s, gradually unravelled.

Gordon supported Pierre Trudeau's winning 1968 bid for the Liberal leadership, after Pearson announced his retirement in late 1967. Trudeau, after he became prime minister, invited Gordon to join his Cabinet in April 1968. However, Gordon declined over some misgivings about being able to work successfully with Trudeau and decided not to run again for office in the June 1968 general election.

== Returns to business ==
After leaving politics in 1968, he returned to business. He continued to argue for economic nationalist causes and in 1970, along with Peter C. Newman of the Toronto Star, economist Abraham Rotstein, and University of Toronto professor Mel Watkins, founded the Committee for an Independent Canada. Canadian historian Jack Granatstein argues in Yankee Go Home? that the CIC "helped to create the atmosphere in which Trudeau's government established the Canada Development Corporation in 1971 to 'buy back' Canada."

== Later years ==
Gordon was the Chancellor of York University from 1973 to 1977. He published his political memoirs in 1977, and died in 1987.

== Honours and awards ==
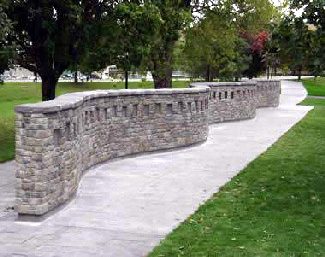
Wall of Honour, Royal Military College of Canada

In 1976, he was made a Companion of the Order of Canada. He was made a Commander of the Order of the British Empire in 1946 for his war services. In 2009, 1681 Honourable Walter L. Gordon, PC, CC, CBE, FCA, LLD (1906–1987) was added to the wall of honour at the Royal Military College of Canada in Kingston, Ontario.

== Archives ==
There is a Walter Lockhart Gordon fonds at Library and Archives Canada.

== Electoral record ==
1965 Canadian federal election: Davenport, Toronto
Party	Candidate	Votes	%	±%
Liberal	Walter L. Gordon	9,887	58.4	+3.6
Progressive Conservative	Daniel Iannuzzi	3,907	23.1	+0.6
New Democratic	Nelson W. Abraham	2,918	17.2	-4.4
Communist	William Kashtan	224	1.3	
Total valid votes		16,936	100.0	

1963 Canadian federal election: Davenport
Party	Candidate	Votes	%	±%
Liberal	Walter L. Gordon	11,023	54.7	+12.1
Progressive Conservative	Pauline Miles	4,520	22.4	-9.0
New Democratic	Vic Cathers	4,347	21.6	-2.7
Social Credit	Roland Ring	245	1.2	+0.7
Total valid votes		20,135	100.0	

1962 Canadian federal election: Davenport
Party	Candidate	Votes	%	±%
Liberal	Walter L. Gordon	9,101	42.6	+11.1
Progressive Conservative	M. Douglas Morton	6,713	31.5	-17.1
New Democratic	Bill Sefton	5,181	24.3	+4.4
Communist	Phyllis Clarke	231	1.1	
Social Credit	Raymond Bell	117	0.5	
Total valid votes		21,343	100.0	

Note: NDP vote is compared to CCF vote in 1958 election.

== Writings ==
- Troubled Canada: The Need for New Domestic Policies, by Walter Gordon, 1961.
- A Choice for Canada: Independence or Colonial Status, by Walter Gordon, 1966.
- Storm Signals: New Economic Policies for Canada, by Walter Gordon, 1975.
- A Political Memoir, by Walter Gordon, Toronto 1977, McClelland & Stewart publishers, ISBN 0-7710-3440-7.

Preceded by Floyd Chalmers	Chancellor of York University; 1973–1977	Succeeded by John Robarts
