= Miguel Figueroa =

Canadian communist leader (born 1952)

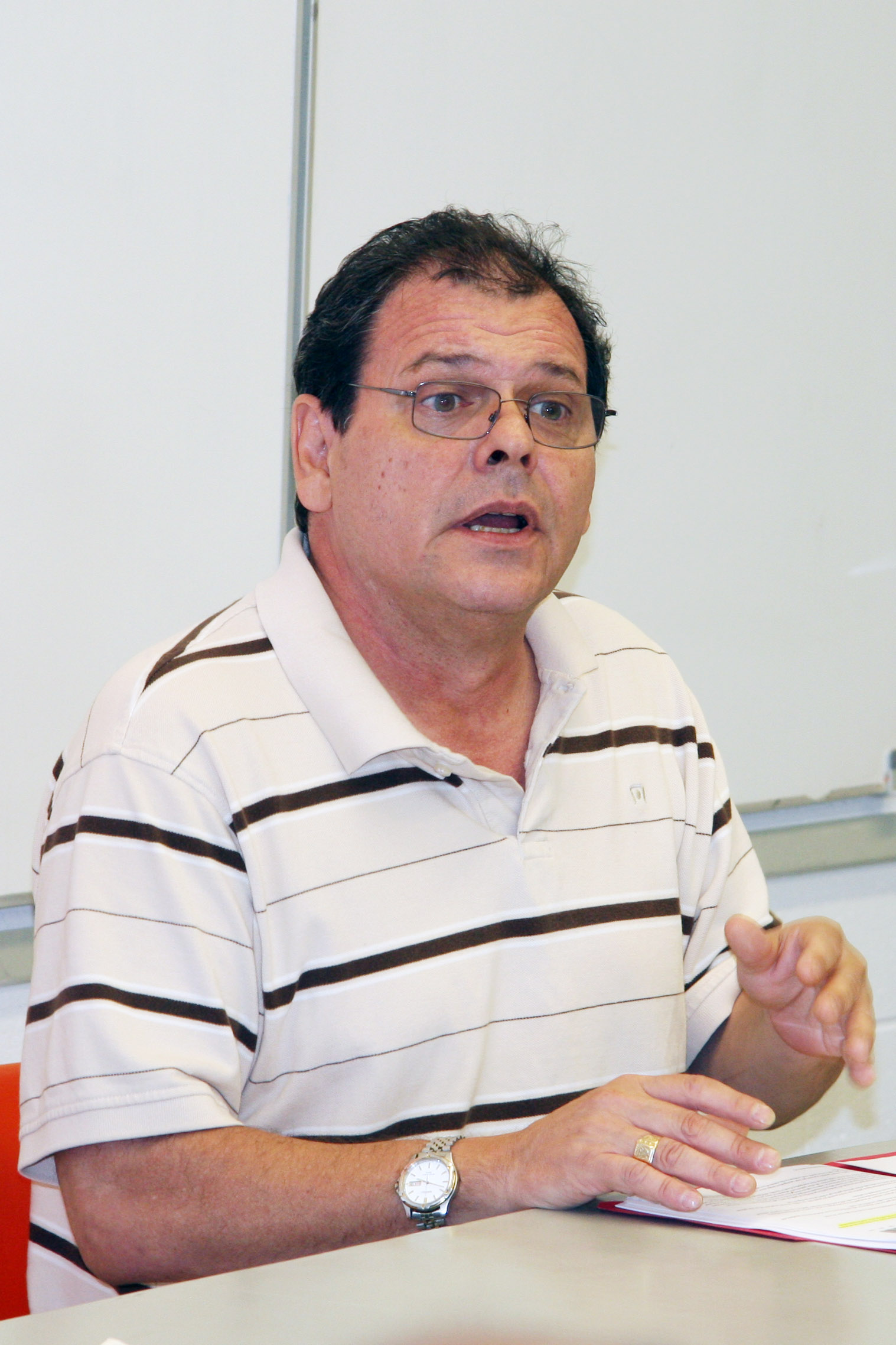
- Figueroa in 2012

President of the Canadian Peace Congress
- Incumbent
- Assumed office 2017
- Preceded by: Dave McKee

Leader of the Communist Party of Canada
- In office 1992–2015
- Preceded by: George Hewison
- Succeeded by: Elizabeth Rowley

Personal details
- Born: July 29, 1952 (age 74) Montreal, Quebec, Canada
- Party: Communist Party of Canada
- Occupation: Politician

Miguel Figueroa (born July 29, 1952) is a Canadian political activist who was the leader of the Communist Party of Canada from 1992 to 2015. He is known for the landmark Figueroa case, which redefined the role of small parties and Canadian Parliamentary democracy, as well as his role re-establishing the Communist Party of Canada in the post-Soviet era.

== Early political career ==
Figueroa was born in Montreal, Quebec, Canada. He attended Dawson College, McGill and Concordia in Montreal, before joining the staff of the National Union of Students in 1975 as a national field organizer.

Figueroa joined the Communist Party in 1977. In 1978, he became the party's Greater Vancouver organizer. From 1986 to 1992, Figueroa served as regional correspondent for the Canadian Tribune and the Party's Atlantic region leader.

== Leadership of the Communist Party of Canada ==
The dissolution of the Soviet Union produced sharply different assessments within the CPC. The protracted ideological, political, organizational and legal battle created much confusion and disorientation within the ranks of the Party, and paralysed both its independent and united front work for over two years. Ultimately, the Hewison-led majority in the party's Central Committee and Central 28th Convention voted to abandon Marxism-Leninism. An orthodox minority, led by Elizabeth Rowley, Figueroa and former leader William Kashtan, resisted this effort. As the inner-party conflict intensified, the Hewison leadership expelled Rowley and 10 other leading opponents of the reformist orientation being imposed, and the moves to liquidate the party entirely. In August 1991, Rowley and the other expelled members took the Communist Party to court. An out-of-court settlement resulted in the Hewison leadership relinquishing the name "Communist Party of Canada", and in return split the party's assets with the Hewison group under the umbrella of the Cecil-Ross Society, a publishing and educational foundation previously associated with the party.

A convention was held in December 1992 in which delegates declared themselves to be the continuation of the Communist Party (thus the meeting was titled the 30th CPC Convention). Delegates rejected the changes instituted by Hewison and reaffirmed the CPC as a Marxist-Leninist organization. Since half of the old party's assets were now the property of the Hewison-led Cecil Ross Society, the CPC convention decided to launch a new newspaper, the People's Voice, to replace the Canadian Tribune and Pacific Tribune.

Elected leader in December 1992 at the 30th Party Convention, Figueroa was re-elected to that office until his resignation in January 2016, for health reasons. Over his 23-year term, Figueroa led the party through eight federal election campaigns, touring and speaking across the country. As part of a new collective leadership, he worked to help achieve what the Party considers the clarification of its revolutionary orientation as well as its ideological identity based on Marxism-Leninism. In particular, Figueroa participated in the elaboration of the Party's new political program, Canada’s Future is Socialism!, a process which began in the mid-1990s and culminated in the adoption of the final version at the 33rd Central Convention in February 2001.

His leadership also saw the launch of People’s Voice and, later, Clarté, as well as The Spark!, the CPC's theoretical and discussion journal. The Party re-established several clubs and committees, including the Party's Quebec component the Communist Party of Quebec, as well as the youth organization known as the Young Communist League. The Party continues to play a role in many labour, peace, environmental, aboriginal, women's, student, immigrant and other people's movements.

Figueroa chaired the international commission of the Party and represented the CPC around the world, including Greece, Portugal, India, China, Vietnam, South Africa, Cuba, Venezuela and the United States. He was regularly present at the International Meeting of Communist and Workers' Parties where, on behalf of the Party, he advocated for efforts to build greater cooperation, political cohesion, and unity of action among Communist and Workers’ parties to deal with the growing dangers of imperialism and urgent problems of peace, solidarity and protection of the global environment.

The 38th Central Convention of the CPC was held May 21–23, 2016 in Toronto. The Convention included a tribute to Miguel Figueroa for his lengthy service as party leader; it also elected Elizabeth Rowley as the new national leader. Figueroa was elected to the new 23-member Central Committee.

== Recent History ==
In October 2016, Figueroa was invited to join the Executive of the Canadian Peace Congress, and was subsequently appointed "interim President" in early 2017. He organized several speaking tours with Eva Bartlett and Canadian author Stephen Gowans in the winter and spring of 2017, and undertook a Canada-wide tour in the fall of 2017, which covered 13 cities across the country. He also represented the Peace Congress in solidarity missions to Venezuela and Syria during that year. In 2018 he participated in a hemispheric conference of peace organizations held in Moca, Dominican Republic in September, and the Executive Meeting of the World Peace Council in Damascus, Syria in October.

In November 2018, the Peace Congress convened a country-wide Convention in Toronto, at which time Figueroa was elected President, leading an 11-member Executive Committee elected at the Convention.

== Figueroa v. Canada ==
In 1993, the fledgling CPC was still recovering from its crisis and split. The Party now had only a few hundred members, and had lost a number of assets, including the party's headquarters at 24 Cecil Street in Toronto. As a result, the CPC was not in a position to run fifty candidates in the 1993 federal election, the number required to maintain official party status because of recent changes to Canada's Elections Act. As a result, the newly relaunched CPC was deregistered by Elections Canada, and its remaining assets were seized by the government. A prolonged legal battle, Figueroa v. Canada ensued, resulting in a Supreme Court of Canada ruling in 2003 that overturned a provision in the Elections Act requiring fifty candidates for official party status (the number had been increased by an act of parliament in the intervening years). Earlier in the legal battle, the party had its deregistration overturned and its seized assets restored.

== Canadian federal elections since 2000 ==
Figueroa has run in nine Canadian general elections and at least two provincial elections:

- 1979 British Columbia general election: Figueroa ran in the two-member riding of Vancouver Centre, and finished eighth in a field of eight candidates with 237 votes. Gary Lauk and Emery Barnes of the New Democratic Party of British Columbia won.
- 1984 Canadian federal election: Figueroa ran in the riding of Vancouver East, and finished last with 259 votes. Margaret Mitchell of the New Democratic Party won.
- 1988 Canadian federal election: Figueroa ran in the riding of Halifax, and finished 5th in a field of 7 candidates with 151 votes. Mary Clancy of the Liberal Party of Canada won.
- 1993 Canadian federal election: Figueroa ran as an independent in the riding of Parkdale—High Park, and finished 9th out of a field of 11 with 105 votes. Jesse Flis of the Liberals won.
- 1995 Ontario general election: Figueroa ran in the riding of Beaches—Woodbine, and finished 5th in a field of six candidates with 169 votes. Frances Lankin of the New Democratic Party of Ontario won.
- 1997 Canadian federal election: Figueroa ran as an independent in the riding of Davenport, and finished 7th in a field of 8 with 194 votes. Charles Caccia of the Liberals won.
- 2000 Canadian federal election: Figueroa ran in the riding of Toronto—Danforth, and finished 9th in a field of 10 with 129 votes. Dennis Mills of the Liberals won.
- 2004 Canadian federal election: Figueroa ran in the riding of Beaches—East York in Toronto, and finished 7th in a field of 8 with 62 votes. Maria Minna of the Liberals won.
- Between 2006 and 2015, Figueroa ran in every federal election in the riding of Davenport, placing fifth or sixth in each.

== Electoral record ==
2015 Canadian federal election: Davenport
Party	Candidate	Votes	%	±%	Expenditures
Liberal	Julie Dzerowicz	21,947	44.26	+16.36	$81,434.76
New Democratic	Andrew Cash	20,506	41.36	-12.36	$113,630.62
Conservative	Carlos Oliveira	5,233	10.55	-3.67	$8,821.20
Green	Dan Stein	1,530	3.09	-0.33	$8,434.06
Communist	Miguel Figueroa	261	0.53	–	–
Independent	Chai Kalevar	107	0.22	–	$1,430.00
Total valid votes/expense limit		49,584	100.00		$205,012.65
Total rejected ballots		287	0.58	–	
Turnout		49,871	69.19	–	
Eligible voters		72,082			
Liberal gain from New Democratic		Swing		+14.36	
Source: Elections Canada

2011 Canadian federal election: Davenport
Party	Candidate	Votes	%	±%	Expenditures
New Democratic	Andrew Cash	21,096	53.74	+22.48	
Liberal	Mario Silva	10,946	27.89	-17.88	
Conservative	Theresa Rodrigues	5,573	14.20	+3.19	
Green	Wayne Scott	1,344	3.42	-7.07	
Communist	Miguel Figueroa	167	0.43	-0.03	
Animal Alliance	Simon Luisi	128	0.33	+0.07	
Total valid votes/expense limit		39,254	100.00		
Total rejected ballots		235	0.60	-0.10	
Turnout		39,489	61.92	+8.88	

2008 Canadian federal election: Davenport
Party	Candidate	Votes	%	±%	Expenditures
Liberal	Mario Silva	15,953	45.77	-6.10	$47,491
New Democratic	Peter Ferreira	10,896	31.26	-1.35	$55,530
Conservative	Theresa Rodrigues	3,838	11.01	+0.21	$13,993
Green	Wayne Scott	3,655	10.49	+6.79	$12,172
Canadian Action	Wendy Forrest	172	0.49	+0.18	$723
Communist	Miguel Figueroa	160	0.46	+0.02	$432
Animal Alliance	Simon Luisi	92	0.26	–	$957
Marxist–Leninist	Sarah Thompson	87	0.25	-0.01	
Total valid votes/expense limit		34,853	100.00	$79,438	
Total rejected ballots		245	0.70	+0.09	
Turnout		35,098	53.03	-7.58	

2006 Canadian federal election: Davenport
Party	Candidate	Votes	%	±%
Liberal	Mario Silva	20,172	51.87	+1.18
New Democratic	Gord Perks	12,681	32.61	-1.52
Conservative	Theresa Rodrigues	4,202	10.80	+1.50
Green	Mark O'Brien	1,440	3.70	-0.48
Communist	Miguel Figueroa	172	0.44	+0.03
Canadian Action	Wendy Forrest	122	0.31	+0.02
Marxist–Leninist	Sarah Thompson	103	0.26	+0.02
Total valid votes		38,892	100.00	
Total rejected ballots		240	0.61	-0.22
Turnout		39,132	60.61	+7.72
Elections Canada, Riding of Davenport, Electoral District 35015.

2004 Canadian federal election: Beaches—East York
Party	Candidate	Votes	%	±%
Liberal	Maria Minna	22,494	47.93	−5.29
New Democratic	Peter Tabuns	15,156	32.29	+11.77
Conservative	Nick Nikopoulos	6,603	14.07	−8.53
Green	Peter Davison	2,127	4.53	
Marijuana	Daniel Dufresne	365	0.78	
Independent	Edward Slota	80	0.17	
Communist	Miguel Figueroa	62	0.13	
Marxist–Leninist	Roger Carter	46	0.10	
Total valid votes		46,933	99.57	
Total rejected ballots		204	0.43	
Turnout		47,137	64.02	
Eligible voters		73,623		
Liberal hold		Swing		-8.53
Change is computed from the 2000 redistributed results. Conservative vote is compared to the total of the Canadian Alliance vote and Progressive Conservative vote in 2000 election.

1997 Canadian federal election: Davenport, Toronto
Party	Candidate	Votes	%	±%
Liberal	Charles Caccia	17,195	65.9	-8.0
New Democratic	Chris Masterson	4,807	18.4	+9.4
Progressive Conservative	Adele Pereira	2,628	10.1	+5.5
Green	Richard Procter	551	2.1	+1.2
Canadian Action	Ann Emmett	293	1.1	
Marxist–Leninist	Francesco Chilelli	250	1.0	+0.7
Independent	Miguel Figueroa	194	0.7	
Independent	John Munoro	190	0.7	
Total valid votes		26,108	100.0	

1988 Canadian federal election: Halifax
Party	Candidate	Votes	%	±%
Liberal	Mary Clancy	22,470	43.00	+8.64
Progressive Conservative	Stewart McInnes	19,840	37.97	-6.80
New Democratic	Ray Larkin	9,269	17.74	-2.71
Libertarian	Howard J. MacKinnon	292	0.56	
Communist	Miguel Figueroa	151	0.29	
Independent	Tony Seed	134	0.26	
Commonwealth of Canada	J. Basil MacDougall	94	0.18	
Total valid votes		52,250	100.00	
Liberal gain from Progressive Conservative		Swing		+7.72

1984 Canadian federal election: Vancouver East
Party	Candidate	Votes	%	±%
New Democratic	Margaret Mitchell	18,464	51.79	+7.88
Liberal	Shirley Maple Wong	9,044	25.37	–14.64
Progressive Conservative	Jack Volrich	7,210	20.22	+5.61
Rhinoceros	Cameron H. McCabe	342	0.96	+0.35
Libertarian	Sandy MacDonald	330	0.93	–
Communist	Miguel Figueroa	259	0.73	+0.17
Total valid votes		35,649	99.01	
Total rejected ballots		358	0.99	+0.14
Turnout		36,007	71.90	+8.55
Eligible voters		50,076		
New Democratic hold		Swing		+11.26
Source: Elections Canada

1993 federal election: Parkdale—High Park
Party	Candidate	Votes	%
Liberal	(x)Jesse Flis	22,358	54.36
Reform	Lee Primeau	6,647	16.16
Progressive Conservative	Don Baker	5,668	13.78
New Democratic Party	David Miller	3,855	9.37
National	Stephen A. Biega	1,320	3.21
Green	Richard Roy	430	1.05
Natural Law	Wanda Beaver	371	0.90
Libertarian	Haig Baronikian	264	0.64
Ind. (Communist)	Miguel Figueroa	105	0.26
Abolitionist	Thomas Earl Pennington	60	0.15
Marxist-Leninist	André Vachon	53	0.13
Total valid votes		41,131	100.00
Rejected, unmarked and declined ballots		416	
Turnout		41,547	66.37
