= Charles Caccia =

Canadian politician

The Honourable Charles Caccia PC

Minister of the Environment
- In office August 12, 1983 – September 16, 1984
- Prime Minister: Pierre Elliott Trudeau; John Turner
- Preceded by: John Roberts
- Succeeded by: Suzanne Blais-Grenier

Minister of Labour
- In office September 22, 1981 – August 12, 1983
- Prime Minister: Pierre Elliott Trudeau
- Preceded by: Gerald Regan
- Succeeded by: André Ouellet

Member of Parliament for Davenport
- In office June 25, 1968 – June 28, 2004
- Preceded by: Walter L. Gordon
- Succeeded by: Mario Silva

Personal details
- Born: April 28, 1930 Milan, Italy
- Died: May 3, 2008 (aged 78) Ottawa, Ontario, Canada
- Party: Liberal
- Spouse(s): Mildred (div), Iva
- Profession: Professor

Charles L. Caccia, PC (April 28, 1930 – May 3, 2008) was a Canadian politician. Caccia was a Liberal member of the House of Commons of Canada. He represented the Toronto riding of Davenport between 1968 and 2004.

== Background ==
Caccia was born in 1930 in Milan, Italy. He became a professor of forestry at the University of Toronto, and was a co-founder of COSTI in Toronto. Caccia's first wife, Mildred, was a candidate for the Ontario Liberal Party in a provincial election in the 1970s. They had two children, Nicolette and John, and were divorced. Caccia was survived by second wife Iva.

== Politics ==
Caccia was best known for his strong pro-environment views on the left of the Liberal party. He served at various times during the ministries of Pierre Trudeau and John Turner as Minister of Labour, Minister of the Environment, Parliamentary Secretary to the Solicitor General of Canada, Parliamentary Secretary to the President of the Treasury Board, and Parliamentary Secretary to the Minister of Manpower and Immigration. He most recently was the Chair of the Standing Committee on Environment and Sustainable Development, and of the subcommittee on Agenda and Procedure of the Standing Committee on Environment and Sustainable Development. Caccia was one of only three cabinet members to endorse Jean Chrétien in the 1984 Liberal Party of Canada leadership election, along with David Collenette and Roméo LeBlanc. He was the Liberals' Environment critic from 1984 to 1989, and spent most of the rest of his career on the backbench.

One of the most left-leaning Liberal Members of Parliament (MPs) of the time, he was known for his stances on environmental issues and his staunch opposition to the 2003 invasion of Iraq, he was one of the few Liberal MPs to back Sheila Copps in the Liberal Party's 2003 leadership election. His left-leaning politics and support of Copps ended his political career when the more right-leaning Paul Martin became Liberal leader and prime minister in 2004. Martin backed former Toronto city councillor Mario Silva for the Liberal Party nomination in Davenport. With Martin's support, Silva signed up enough new members until it was obvious he would defeat Caccia for the nomination. Caccia pulled out of the race, and after some talk, chose to retire from politics rather than run as an independent or Green in the 2004 election.

In 1964, he was labelled as a communist by East York Mayor True Davidson for suggesting that Toronto city run day cares accept children from mothers in two parent working families. At the time, they only accepted children from single working mothers.

== Electoral record ==
2000 Canadian federal election: Davenport, Toronto
| Party | Candidate | Votes | % | ±% |
|---|---|---|---|---|
| Liberal | Charles Caccia | 17,014 | 66.7 | +0.9 |
| New Democratic | Jordan Berger | 3,457 | 13.6 | -4.9 |
| Alliance | Anthony Montenegrino | 2,021 | 7.9 | |
| Progressive Conservative | Eduardo Marcos | 1,526 | 6.0 | -4.1 |
| Green | Mark O'Brien | 642 | 2.5 | +0.4 |
| Marijuana | Elmer Gale | 480 | 1.9 | |
| Canadian Action | Ann Emmett | 288 | 1.1 | |
| Natural Law | Stephen Porter | 73 | 0.3 | |
| Total valid votes | | 25,501 | 100.0 | |

Note: Canadian Alliance vote is compared to the Reform vote in 1997 election.

1997 Canadian federal election: Davenport, Toronto
| Party | Candidate | Votes | % | ±% |
|---|---|---|---|---|
| Liberal | Charles Caccia | 17,195 | 65.9 | -8.0 |
| New Democratic | Chris Masterson | 4,807 | 18.4 | +9.4 |
| Progressive Conservative | Adele Pereira | 2,628 | 10.1 | +5.5 |
| Green | Richard Procter | 551 | 2.1 | +1.2 |
| Canadian Action | Ann Emmett | 293 | 1.1 | |
| Marxist–Leninist | Francesco Chilelli | 250 | 1.0 | +0.7 |
| Independent | Miguel Figueroa | 194 | 0.7 | |
| Independent | John Munoro | 190 | 0.7 | |
| Total valid votes | | 26,108 | 100.0 | |

1993 Canadian federal election: Davenport, Toronto
| Party | Candidate | Votes | % | ±% |
|---|---|---|---|---|
| Liberal | Charles Caccia | 20,100 | 73.9 | +15.0 |
| New Democratic | John Doherty | 2,455 | 9.0 | -9.8 |
| Reform | Michael Jakubcak | 2,107 | 7.7 | |
| Progressive Conservative | Margaret Samuel | 1,251 | 4.6 | -14.0 |
| National | Sherelanne Purcell | 448 | 1.6 | |
| Natural Law | Bruce Hislop | 283 | 1.0 | |
| Green | Sat K. Singh Khalsa | 255 | 0.9 | |
| Libertarian | Nunzio Venuto | 200 | 0.7 | -1.0 |
| Marxist–Leninist | Barbara Seed | 64 | 0.2 | |
| Abolitionist | Susan Lylliane Pennington | 33 | 0.1 | |
| Total valid votes | | 27,196 | 100.0 | |

1988 Canadian federal election: Davenport, Toronto
| Party | Candidate | Votes | % | ±% |
|---|---|---|---|---|
| Liberal | Charles Caccia | 16,436 | 58.9 | +5.2 |
| New Democratic | Anna Menozzi | 5,243 | 18.8 | -3.7 |
| Progressive Conservative | Alex Franco | 5,179 | 18.6 | -2.6 |
| Libertarian | April Henderson | 480 | 1.7 | +0.7 |
| Rhinoceros | Barry Heidt | 214 | 0.8 | |
| Communist | George P. Hewison | 196 | 0.7 | 0.0 |
| Independent | Heather Robertson | 150 | 0.5 | |
| Total valid votes | | 27,898 | 100.0 | |

1984 Canadian federal election: Davenport, Toronto
| Party | Candidate | Votes | % | ±% |
|---|---|---|---|---|
| Liberal | Charles Caccia | 13,248 | 53.7 | -8.8 |
| New Democratic | Manfred Netzel | 5,548 | 22.5 | +0.3 |
| Progressive Conservative | Giovanni Rocca | 5,217 | 21.1 | +7.5 |
| Green | Elgin Blair | 256 | 1.0 | |
| Libertarian | John Scott Hayes | 252 | 1.0 | 0.0 |
| Communist | Gordon Massie | 165 | 0.7 | +0.2 |
| Total valid votes | | 24,686 | 100.0 | |

1980 Canadian federal election: Davenport, Toronto
| Party | Candidate | Votes | % | ±% |
|---|---|---|---|---|
| Liberal | Charles Caccia | 14,545 | 62.4 | +6.5 |
| New Democratic | Ed Brown | 5,170 | 22.2 | -2.2 |
| Progressive Conservative | Italo Luci | 3,167 | 13.6 | -4.3 |
| Libertarian | Richard Brooke | 230 | 1.0 | +0.3 |
| Communist | Gail J. Phillips | 117 | 0.5 | 0.0 |
| Marxist–Leninist | Richard Daly | 72 | 0.3 | 0.0 |
| Total valid votes | | 23,301 | 100.0 | |
lop.parl.ca

1979 Canadian federal election: Davenport, Toronto
| Party | Candidate | Votes | % | ±% |
|---|---|---|---|---|
| Liberal | Charles Caccia | 12,760 | 55.9 | -3.7 |
| New Democratic | Ed Brown | 5,579 | 24.4 | +7.6 |
| Progressive Conservative | Lilliana Edwards | 4,090 | 17.9 | -4.1 |
| Libertarian | George J. Dance | 156 | 0.7 | |
| Communist | Gail J. Phillips | 117 | 0.5 | -0.1 |
| Marxist–Leninist | Richard Daly | 80 | 0.4 | -0.1 |
| Independent | Steve Penner | 48 | 0.2 | |
| Total valid votes | | 22,830 | 100.0 | |

1974 Canadian federal election: Davenport, Toronto
| Party | Candidate | Votes | % | ±% |
|---|---|---|---|---|
| Liberal | Charles Caccia | 12,294 | 59.6 | +15.9 |
| Progressive Conservative | Brownie Darubin | 4,542 | 22.0 | -8.0 |
| New Democratic | Mairi McElhill | 3,476 | 16.8 | -7.8 |
| Communist | Mike Phillips | 123 | 0.6 | -0.3 |
| Independent | John Ross Taylor | 102 | 0.5 | |
| Marxist–Leninist | Richard Daly | 95 | 0.5 | -0.3 |
| Total valid votes | | 20,632 | 100.0 | |

1972 Canadian federal election: Davenport, Toronto
| Party | Candidate | Votes | % | ±% |
|---|---|---|---|---|
| Liberal | Charles Caccia | 9,366 | 43.7 | -6.7 |
| Progressive Conservative | John A. Gillespie | 6,442 | 30.1 | +8.0 |
| New Democratic | Angelo Principe | 5,272 | 24.6 | -2.9 |
| Independent | William Kashtan | 190 | 0.9 | |
| Independent | Richard Daly | 160 | 0.7 | |
| Total valid votes | | 21,430 | 100.0 | |

1968 Canadian federal election: Davenport, Toronto
| Party | Candidate | Votes | % | ±% |
|---|---|---|---|---|
| Liberal | Charles Caccia | 10,736 | 50.4 | -7.9 |
| New Democratic | Otto Bresan | 5,865 | 27.5 | +10.3 |
| Progressive Conservative | Ken Dear | 4,688 | 22.0 | -1.0 |
| Total valid votes | | 21,289 | 100.0 | |
