= Action Canada =

Defunct Canadian political movement

The Action Canada movement was an attempt to establish a new political party in Canada in 1971.

Paul Hellyer, who had been a senior cabinet minister in the Liberal governments of prime ministers Lester B. Pearson and Pierre Trudeau had quit the Liberal Party after being defeated by Trudeau in the 1968 Liberal leadership election.

Hellyer sat as an independent Member of Parliament, and began his attempt to form his own political party in early June 1971. The party was to advocate putting more money in circulation to reduce unemployment, and using wage and price controls to prevent inflation from occurring.

The party attracted some support from members of the Progressive Conservative Party, Liberal Party, and the Social Credit Party. Some senior Social Credit Party officials attended and addressed Action Canada's conference held in Toronto in early October 1971, and Hellyer addressed the Social Credit national convention in Hull, Quebec, on October 9–10. Hellyer gave a 25-minute speech to the predominantly francophone convention, of which only two minutes were in English, explaining how wage and price controls combined with controls over monopoly industries would enable the government to ensure full employment, eliminate inflation, and provide a guaranteed annual income. He received applause for his comments about it being Action Canada policy that French-speaking Quebecers should be able to work in their own language. He did not try to convince party members to join his movement.

Hellyer later accepted Progressive Conservative Party leader Robert Stanfield's invitation to join the PC caucus. He failed to win the PC leadership in 1976, and returned to the Liberal Party again in 1982. After failing to win the Liberal nomination for St. Paul's riding in 1988, he left that party again.

In the early 1990s, Hellyer again formed a new party, the Canadian Action Party. He resigned from the leadership of that party after the New Democratic Party rejected his proposal to merge the two parties.

== See also ==
- List of political parties in Canada
