= John Ritchie MacNicol =

Canadian politician

Member of the Canadian Parliament for Davenport
- In office 1935–1949
- Preceded by: New riding
- Succeeded by: Paul Hellyer

Member of the Canadian Parliament for Toronto Northwest
- In office 1930–1935
- Preceded by: Thomas Langton Church
- Succeeded by: Riding abolished

Personal details
- Born: August 31, 1878 Beaverton, Ontario, Canada
- Died: June 18, 1950 (aged 71)
- Party: Conservative
- Profession: School teacher

John Ritchie MacNicol (August 31, 1878 – June 18, 1950) was a Canadian politician. He served as an MP (Toronto Northwest) from 1930 to 1949.

Born in Beaverton, Ontario, MacNicol was educated at public school, collegiates, and at Bryant & Stratton College in Buffalo, New York. He taught school in Algoma and Grey Counties, Ontario.

MacNicol was a prominent player in the Conservative party internal machinery. From 1917 to 1920, he was president of the South York Liberal-Conservative Association. From 1921 to 1922, he was president of the Ward 6 Toronto Association. From 1921 to 1923, he was secretary of the Liberal-Conservative Association of Ontario and was president from 1923 to 1930. After his election to parliament, he continue to serve in various honorary capacities. At the Ontario Conservative Party convention of 1936, he was elected one of four honorary presidents of the Ontario Conservative Association, the other three being a former Prime Minister and two former Premiers. He served as the president of the Dominion Conservative Association, the local grassroot activist arm of the party, in the early 1940s, and presided over party following the resignation of party leader Robert Manion in 1941.

MacNicol was first elected to the House of Commons of Canada for the Ontario riding of Toronto Northwest in the 1930 federal election. His prominence in the party can be seen through how he secured the party's nomination. Incumbent MP Thomas Langton Church, a polarizing former Toronto Mayor, was pressured by the "party machine" to withdraw from the nomination contest and instead contested Toronto Centre West, the least safe Tory seat in the city. (He was defeated by Liberal Sam Factor, Canada's first Jewish MP.)

MacNicol was re-elected in 1935, 1940, and 1945 for the riding of Davenport. He was defeated by Paul Hellyer in the 1949 election.

He was married to Ms. Maisie MacKinnon of Bruce County, who predeceased him in 1932.

== Electoral record ==
1949 Canadian federal election: Davenport, Toronto
Party	Candidate	Votes	%	±%
Liberal	Paul Hellyer	11,431	39.0	+10.5
Progressive Conservative	John Ritchie MacNicol	10,476	35.8	-12.9
Co-operative Commonwealth	David B. Archer	7,366	25.2	+6.9
Total valid votes		29,273	100.0	

1945 Canadian federal election: Davenport, Toronto
Party	Candidate	Votes	%	±%
Progressive Conservative	John Ritchie MacNicol	13,110	48.6	-8.6
Liberal	William Alexander Gunn	7,682	28.5	-14.3
Co-operative Commonwealth	George Eamon Park	4,931	18.3	
Labor–Progressive	Richard W. Robertson	882	3.3	
Social Credit	David Ewald Hartman	346	1.3	
Total valid votes		26,951	100.0	

Note: Progressive Conservative vote is compared to "National Government" vote in 1940 election.

1940 Canadian federal election: Davenport, Toronto
Party	Candidate	Votes	%	±%
National Government	John Ritchie MacNicol	14,890	57.2	+17.6
Liberal	Neil Cameron	11,140	42.8	+15.0
Total valid votes		26,030	100.0	

Note: "National Government" vote is compared to Conservative vote in 1935 election.

1935 Canadian federal election: Davenport, Toronto
Party	Candidate	Votes	%
Conservative	John Ritchie MacNicol	10,919	39.6
Liberal	John P. Travers	7,675	27.8
Co-operative Commonwealth	John Williams Bruce	4,766	17.3
Reconstruction	W. Harvey Brown	4,216	15.3
Total valid votes		27,576	100.0
