= Paul Hellyer =

Canadian engineer, politician, and writer (1923–2021)

The Honourable Paul Hellyer PC
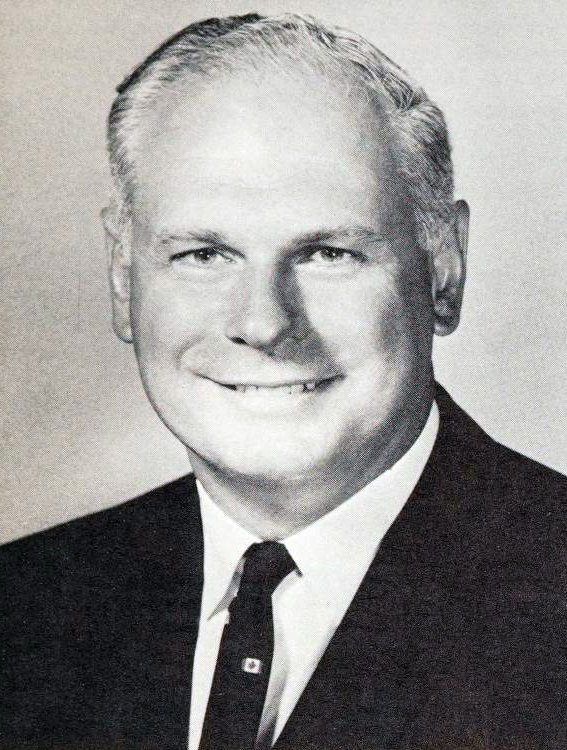
- Hellyer, c. 1967

Minister of Transport
- In office September 19, 1967 – April 30, 1969
- Prime Minister: Lester B. Pearson; Pierre Trudeau
- Preceded by: Jack Pickersgill
- Succeeded by: James Armstrong Richardson

Senior Minister
- In office April 30, 1968 – April 23, 1969
- Prime Minister: Pierre Trudeau
- Preceded by: Office established
- Succeeded by: Vacant

Minister of National Defence
- In office April 22, 1963 – September 18, 1967
- Prime Minister: Lester B. Pearson
- Preceded by: Gordon Churchill
- Succeeded by: Léo Cadieux

Member of Parliament for Trinity
- In office December 15, 1958 – July 7, 1974
- Preceded by: Edward Lockyer
- Succeeded by: Aideen Nicholson

Member of Parliament for Davenport
- In office June 27, 1949 – June 9, 1957
- Preceded by: John Ritchie MacNicol
- Succeeded by: Douglas Morton

Personal details
- Born: Paul Theodore Hellyer; August 6, 1923 Waterford, Ontario, Canada
- Died: August 8, 2021 (aged 98) Toronto, Ontario, Canada
- Party: Canadian Action Party (1997–2017)
- Other political affiliations: Liberal (1949–1971, 1982–1997), Independent (1971), Action Canada (1971–1972), Progressive Conservative (1972–1982)
- Spouse(s): Ellen Jean Ralph (m. 1945; died 2004) Sandra Bussiere (m. 2005)
- Children: 2 sons, 1 daughter
- Education: University of Toronto (BA)
- Profession: Engineer

Military service
- Branch/service: Canadian Army
- Years of service: 1944–1946
- Rank: Gunner
- Unit: Royal Canadian Artillery

Paul Theodore Hellyer PC (August 6, 1923 – August 8, 2021) was a Canadian engineer, politician, writer, and commentator. A prominent Liberal figure in the 1960s, he served as a Member of Parliament for over twenty years and a minister in the government of three Liberal Prime Ministers. In 1968 Prime Minister Pierre Trudeau designated Hellyer as Senior Minister, the first instance for a Prime Minister of Canada to confer a formal title to a cabinet member to signal precedent ahead of all cabinet colleagues. He was the longest serving member of the Queen's Privy Council for Canada at the time of his death. He contested the national leadership of both major parties in parliament, and found another political party but was unable to turn it into political force of significance.

== Early life ==
Hellyer was born and raised on a farm near Waterford, Ontario, the son of Lulla Maude (Anderson) and Audrey Samuel Hellyer. Upon completion of high school, he studied aeronautical engineering at the Curtiss-Wright Technical Institute of Aeronautics in Glendale, California, graduating in 1941. While studying, he also obtained a private pilot's licence.

After graduation, Hellyer was employed at Fleet Aircraft in Fort Erie, Ontario, which was then making training craft for the Royal Canadian Air Force as part of Canada's war effort in World War II. He attempted to become an RCAF pilot himself, but was told no more pilots were necessary, after which he joined the Royal Canadian Artillery and served in Canada as a gunner for the duration of the war.

Hellyer earned a Bachelor of Arts from the University of Toronto in 1949.

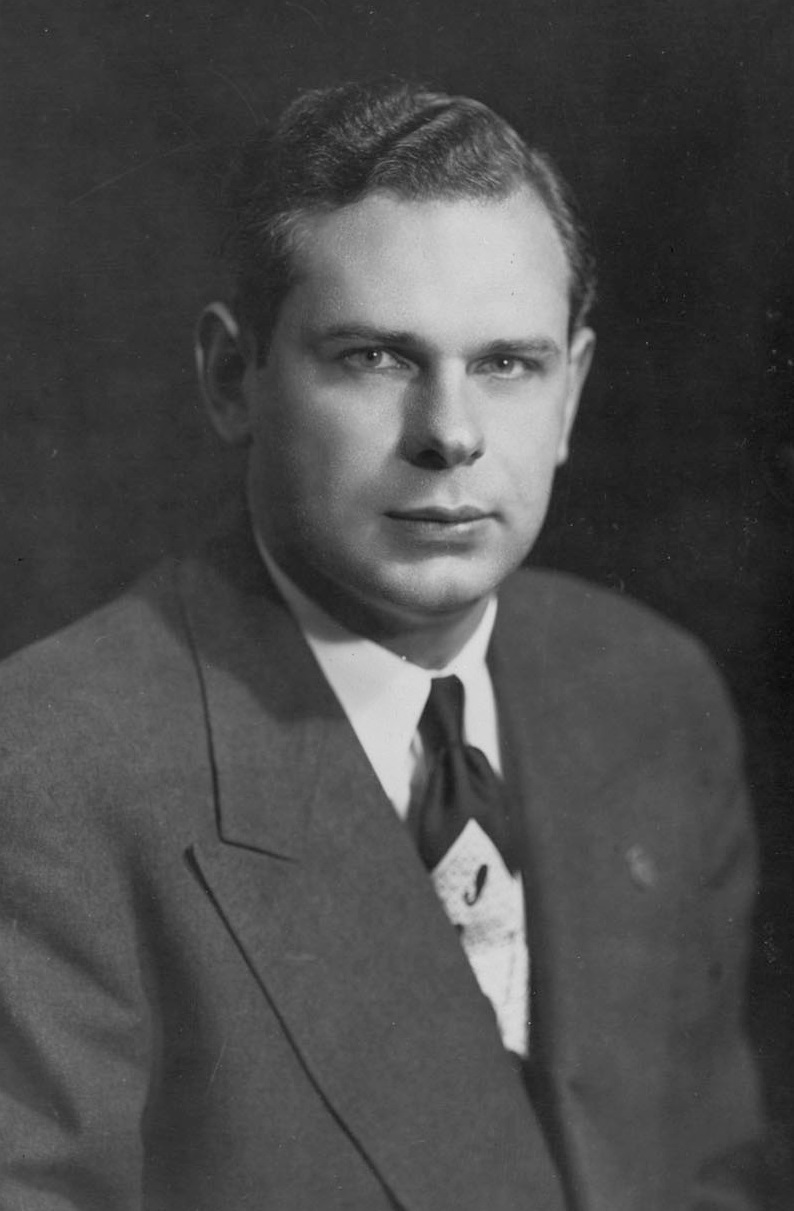
Hellyer in his early 20s (circa 1942–1948)

== Early political career ==
First elected as a Liberal in 1949 federal election in the riding of Davenport, he was the youngest person ever elected to that point in the House of Commons of Canada. He served a brief stint as Parliamentary Assistant to the Minister of National Defence. He was then named Associate Minister of National Defence in the cabinet of Prime Minister Louis St. Laurent. This post was short-lived, though, as Hellyer lost his seat when the St. Laurent government lost the 1957 election two months later.

Hellyer returned to parliament in a 1958 by-election in the neighbouring riding of Trinity, and became an opposition critic of John Diefenbaker's Progressive Conservative government.

== Cabinet minister and Liberal leadership candidate ==
When the Liberals returned to power in the 1963 election, Hellyer became Minister of National Defence in the cabinet of Lester B. Pearson. This was the most significant period in Hellyer's political career. As Minister of Defence, he oversaw the drastic and controversial integration and unification of the Royal Canadian Navy, Canadian Army, and the Royal Canadian Air Force into a single organization, the Canadian Forces.

Hellyer contested the 1968 Liberal leadership election, placing second on the first ballot, but slipped to third on the second and third ballots, and withdrew to support Robert Winters on the fourth ballot, in which Pierre Trudeau won the leadership. He served as Trudeau's Transport Minister.

== Politics 1969–1988 ==
In 1969, Hellyer issued a major report on housing and urban renewal in which he advocated incremental reforms rather than new government programs. He called for greater flexibility in Canada's mortgage loan system and encouraged corporate pension funds to invest more money in housing programs. His approach did not meet with universal acceptance. Some provincial and municipal governments were openly skeptical, and Heward Grafftey, a left-leaning Progressive Conservative (PC) with an interest in housing, called for a more radical approach.

The report also called for the suspension of the "wholesale destruction of older housing" and for "greater selectivity [...] in the demolition of existing houses". Grand urban renewal projects would come to an end as a result of his Task Force. Hellyer resigned from the cabinet in 1969 after a dispute with Trudeau over the implementation of the housing program.

From 1971, Hellyer sat in Parliament as an independent, and after failing to form a new political party called Action Canada, he was invited by PC leader Robert Stanfield to join the PC caucus. He returned to prominence as an opposition critic and was re-elected in the 1972 election as a Progressive Conservative but lost his seat in the 1974 election.

Despite this loss, Hellyer contested the PC leadership election of 1976. His views were too right wing for most delegates, and he alienated many PCs with a speech attacking Red Tories as not being "true conservatives". He finished a distant sixth of eight contestants on the second ballot; Joe Clark won the leadership.

Hellyer rejoined the Liberal Party in 1982 but remained mostly silent in politics. He contested the Liberal nomination in the Toronto riding of St. Paul's in 1988, losing to Aideen Nicholson who had defeated Hellyer 14 years previously when a PC MP in the adjacent riding of Trinity.

Under Prime Minister Trudeau, Hellyer served as Canada's only Senior Minister from April 1968 until resigning from the post in 1969.

== Canadian Action Party ==
In 1997, Hellyer formed the Canadian Action Party (CAP) to provide voters with an economic nationalist option following the collapse of the National Party of Canada. Hellyer believed that both the Progressive Conservative and Liberal parties were embracing globalization, and that the New Democratic Party was no longer able to provide a credible alternative. CAP also embraced Hellyer's proposals for monetary reform: that the government should become more involved in the direction of the economy by gradually reducing the creation of private money and increasing the creation of public money from the current ratio of 5% public / 95% private back to 50% public and 50% private.

His party remained a little-noticed minor party, and Hellyer lost bids for a seat in the House of Commons of Canada in the 1997 and 2000 elections.

Following the 2000 election, and a resurgence for the New Democratic Party, Hellyer approached NDP leadership to discuss the possibility of merging the two parties into 'One Big Party'. This process was furthered by the passage of a unanimous motion at the CAP's convention in 2003.

In early 2004, after several extensions of the merger deadline, the NDP rejected Hellyer's merger proposal which would have required the NDP to change its name. Hellyer resigned as CAP leader, but remained a member of the party. Rumours that he might run for the NDP in the 2004 election proved to be unfounded.

== Extraterrestrial intelligence claims ==
On June 3, 1967, Hellyer inaugurated an unidentified flying object landing pad in St. Paul, Alberta. The pad was built as the town's Canadian Centennial celebration project and as a symbol of keeping space free from human warfare.

In early September 2005, Hellyer made headlines by publicly announcing that he believed in the existence of UFOs. On September 25, 2005, he was a guest speaker at an exopolitics conference in Toronto, where he told the audience that he had seen a UFO one night with his late wife and some friends. The Ottawa Citizen reported in 2007 that Hellyer was demanding world governments disclose alien technology that could be used to solve the problem of climate change. In an interview with RT (formerly Russia Today) in 2014, Hellyer said that at least four species of aliens had been visiting Earth for thousands of years, with most of them coming from other star systems, although there are some living on Venus, Mars and "Saturn's moon".

Hellyer repeated unsubstantiated claims of an Alien-Human exchange program ("Project Serpo") that originated in 1983 by Rick Doty; Doty would later admit to fabricating disinformation to mislead UFO proponents.

== Personal life and death ==
Hellyer was one of the earliest investors in the Toronto Sun in 1971. He served as a syndicated columnist for the newspaper between 1974 and 1984. He resided in Toronto and had three children and five grandchildren.

Hellyer died in Toronto on August 8, 2021 of complications from a fall, two days after his 98th birthday.

== Books ==
Hellyer has written several books on Canada and globalization, including One Big Party: To Keep Canada Independent, in which he promoted the merger of the CAP, NDP, and various left-wing activists to save Canada from the effects of globalization, as well as possible annexation by the United States.

- Agenda, a Plan for Action (1971)
- Exit Inflation (1981)
- Jobs for All: Capitalism on Trial (1984)
- Damn the Torpedoes (1990)
- Funny Money: A common sense alternative to mainline economics (1994)
- Surviving the Global Financial Crisis: The Economics of Hope for Generation X (1996)
- Evil Empire : Globalization's Darker Side (1997)
- Stop: Think (1999)
- Goodbye Canada (2001)
- One Big Party: To Keep Canada Independent (2003)
- A Miracle in Waiting (2010), update of Surviving the Global Financial Crisis
- Light at the End of the Tunnel: A Survival Plan for the Human Species (2010)
- The Money Mafia: A World in Crisis (2014)
- Hope Restored: An Autobiography by Paul Hellyer: My Life and Views on Canada, the U.S., the World & the Universe (2018)
- Liberation! The Economics of Hope (2020)

== Electoral record ==
=== 1968 Liberal Party of Canada leadership contest ===
Delegate support by Ballot Withdrew prior to ballot Eliminated
Candidate	First ballot		Second ballot		Third ballot		Fourth ballot	
Candidate	Votes	%	Votes	%	Votes	%	Votes	%
Pierre Trudeau	752	31.81	964 ▲212	40.78 ▲8.97	1,051 ▲87	44.59 ▲3.81	1,203 ▲152	51.15 ▲6.56
Paul Hellyer	330	13.96	465 ▲135	19.67 ▲5.71	377 ▼88	15.99 ▼3.68	Endorsed Winters	
Robert Winters	293	12.39	473 ▲180	20.01 ▲7.61	621 ▲148	26.35 ▲6.34	954 ▲333	40.56 ▲14.21
Paul Martin Sr.	277	11.72	Did not endorse					
John Turner	277	11.72	347 ▲70	14.68 ▲2.96	279 ▼68	11.84 ▼2.84	195 ▼84	8.29 ▼3.55
Joe Greene	169	7.15	104 ▼65	4.4 ▼2.75	29 ▼75	1.23 ▼3.17	Endorsed Trudeau	
Allan MacEachen	163	6.90	^{[A]}11 ▼152	0.47 ▼6.43	Endorsed Trudeau			
Eric Kierans	103	4.36	Did not endorse					
Harold Lloyd Henderson	0	—	Did not endorse					
Valid Ballots	2,364		2,364	Steady	2,357	▼7	2,352	▼5
Spoiled ballots (% of ballots cast)	24	1.0	15	0.6	19	0.8	13	0.6
Delegate ballots cast	2,388		2,379	▼11	2,376	▼3	2,365	▼11

^{A} MacEachen announced after the first ballot that he was withdrawing and would support Trudeau, but he missed the deadline to remove his name from the ballot.

=== 1976 Progressive Conservative Party of Canada leadership contest ===
Delegate support by ballot
Candidate	1st ballot		2nd ballot		3rd ballot		4th ballot	
Candidate	Votes cast	%	Votes cast	%	Votes cast	%	Votes cast	%
CLARK, Charles Joseph (Joe)	277	11.7%	532	22.8%	969	41.4%	1,187	51.4%
WAGNER, Claude	531	22.5%	667	28.5%	1,003	42.8%	1,122	48.6%
MULRONEY, Martin Brian	357	15.1%	419	17.9%	369	15.8%	Eliminated; Did not endorse	
HORNER, John Henry (Jack)	235	10.0%	286	12.2%	Endorsed Wagner			
HELLYER, Paul Theodore	231	9.8%	118	5.1%	Endorsed Wagner			
MACDONALD, Flora Isabel	214	9.1%	239	10.2%	Endorsed Clark			
FRASER, John Allen	127	5.4%	34	1.5%	Endorsed Clark			
NOWLAN, John Patrick (Pat)	86	3.6%	42	1.8%	Endorsed Wagner			
STEVENS, Sinclair McKnight	182	7.7%	Endorsed Clark					
GILLIES, James McPhail	87	3.7%	Endorsed Clark					
GRAFFTEY, William Heward	33	1.4%	Endorsed Clark					
Total	2,360	100.0%	2,337	100.0%	2,341	100.0%	2,309	100.0%

=== Local parliamentary contests, Davenport - 1949, 1953, 1957 ===
1949 Canadian federal election: Davenport, Toronto
Party	Candidate	Votes	%	±%
Liberal	Paul Hellyer	11,431	39.0	+10.5
Progressive Conservative	John Ritchie MacNicol	10,476	35.8	-12.9
Co-operative Commonwealth	David B. Archer	7,366	25.2	+6.9
Total valid votes		29,273	100.0	

1953 Canadian federal election: Davenport, Toronto
Party	Candidate	Votes	%	±%
Liberal	Paul Hellyer	8,919	41.1	+2.1
Progressive Conservative	Harold McBride	6,998	32.3	-3.5
Co-operative Commonwealth	Fred Young	4,968	22.9	-2.3
Labor–Progressive	Hector Harold MacArthur	802	3.7	
Total valid votes		21,687	100.0	

1957 Canadian federal election: Davenport, Toronto
Party	Candidate	Votes	%	±%
Progressive Conservative	M. Douglas Morton	8,989	40.7	-0.4
Liberal	Paul Hellyer	6,665	30.2	-2.1
Co-operative Commonwealth	F. Andrew Brewin	6,414	29.1	+6.2
Total valid votes		22,068	100.0	

=== Local parliamentary contest, Trinity 1958 to 1974 ===
December 15, 1958 by-election following Lockyer's death: Trinity, Toronto
Party	Candidate	Votes
Liberal	Paul Hellyer	5,175
Progressive Conservative	Joe Lesniak	4,404
Co-operative Commonwealth	John Elchuk	1,724
Labor–Progressive	Sam Walsh	488

1962 Canadian federal election: Trinity, Toronto
Party	Candidate	Votes
Liberal	Paul Hellyer	9,615
Progressive Conservative	Stanley Frolick	6,124
New Democratic Party	Thomas Paton	3,740
Communist	Leslie Morris	449
Independent	Peter D'Agostino	295
Social Credit	David E. Hartman	227

1963 Canadian federal election: Trinity, Toronto
Party	Candidate	Votes
Liberal	Paul Hellyer	10,595
Progressive Conservative	John Wasylenko	5,171
New Democratic Party	Thomas Paton	3,512
Communist	Leslie Morris	391

1965 Canadian federal election: Trinity, Toronto
Party	Candidate	Votes
Liberal	Paul Hellyer	9,897
Progressive Conservative	John Brazill	4,375
New Democratic Party	Enzo Ragno	2,773

1968 Canadian federal election: Trinity, Toronto
Party	Candidate	Votes
Liberal	Paul Hellyer	13,126
Progressive Conservative	Ed Robertson	5,360
New Democratic Party	Jim De Candole	4,177

1972 Canadian federal election: Trinity, Toronto
Party	Candidate	Votes
Progressive Conservative	Paul Hellyer	8,518
Liberal	Aideen Nicholson	8,334
New Democratic Party	Edward Boucher	3,725
Unknown	Norman Freed	330
Unknown	Rae Greig	134

1974 Canadian federal election: Trinity, Toronto
Party	Candidate	Votes
Liberal	Aideen Nicholson	10,683
Progressive Conservative	Paul Hellyer	6,537
New Democratic Party	Jonathan Cohen	2,637
Communist	William Kashtan	234
Marxist–Leninist	Jim Turnbull	90
Independent	Martin K. Weiche	64

=== Local parliamentary contests, 1997 & 2000 ===
1997 Canadian federal election: Etobicoke—Lakeshore
Party	Candidate	Votes	%	±%
Liberal	Jean Augustine	21,180	46.2	+4.1
Progressive Conservative	Charles Donley	10,509	22.9	-8.0
Reform	Robert Beard	8,697	19.0	+0.2
New Democratic	Karen Ridley	4,085	8.9	+3.9
Canadian Action	Paul Hellyer	770	1.7	
Green	David Burman	315	0.7	
Natural Law	Geraldine Jackson	139	0.3	-0.3
Marxist–Leninist	Barbara Seed	133	0.3	+0.1
Total valid votes		45,828	100.0	

2000 Canadian federal election: Toronto Centre—Rosedale
Party	Candidate	Votes	%	±%
Liberal	Bill Graham	26,203	55.33	+6.08
Progressive Conservative	Randall Pearce	8,149	17.21	-2.13
New Democratic	David Berlin	5,300	11.19	-9.22
Alliance	Richard Walker	5,058	10.68	+2.83
Canadian Action	Paul Hellyer	1,466	3.10	+2.44
Marijuana	Neev Tapiero	722	1.52	
Natural Law	David Gordon	224	0.47	-0.11
Communist	Dan Goldstick	121	0.26	
Marxist–Leninist	Philip Fernandez	116	0.24	-0.11
Total valid votes		47,359	100.00	
Total rejected ballots		246	0.52	−0.38
Turnout		47,605	57.19	−9.82
Electors on the lists		83,243		
Sources: Official Results, Elections Canada, Poll-by-poll Result Files, Elections Canada, and Financial Returns, Elections Canada.

Note: Canadian Alliance vote is compared to the Reform vote in 1997 election.

== Archives ==
There is a Paul Hellyer fonds at Library and Archives Canada.

== See also ==
- Committee on Monetary and Economic Reform
- Disclosure (ufology)

Party political offices
Preceded by none	Canadian Action Party leaders 1997–2003	Succeeded by Connie Fogal
