= Toronto Northwest (federal electoral district) =

Former federal electoral district in Ontario, Canada

Ontario electoral district

Defunct federal electoral district
- Legislature: House of Commons
- District created: 1924
- District abolished: 1933
- First contested: 1925
- Last contested: 1930

Toronto Northwest was a federal electoral district represented in the House of Commons of Canada from 1925 to 1935. It was located in the city of Toronto in the province of Ontario. This riding was created in 1924 from parts of Parkdale, Toronto North and York South ridings.

It consisted of the part of the city of Toronto north of Bloor Street, west of Bathurst St. and east of the Northern Division of the Canadian National Railway, the main line of the Canadian Pacific Railway eastward and Landsdowne Avenue.

The electoral district was abolished in 1933 when it was redistributed between Davenport, Spadina, Trinity and York West ridings.

== Members of Parliament ==
This riding has elected the following members of Parliament:

Parliament	Years	Member	Party
Riding created from Parkdale, Toronto North and York South
15th	1925–1926	Thomas Langton Church	Conservative
16th	1926–1930	Thomas Langton Church	Conservative
17th	1930–1935	John Ritchie MacNicol	Conservative
Riding dissolved into Davenport, Spadina, Trinity and York West

== Election history ==
1925 Canadian federal election: Toronto Northwest
Party	Candidate	Votes	%	±%
Conservative	Thomas Langton Church	16,329		
Liberal	James Gilchrist	3,106		
Labour	James Simpson	1,542		
Independent Conservative	Caroline Sophia Brown	544		
Independent Conservative	Wallace Cochrane	104		

1926 Canadian federal election: Toronto Northwest
Party	Candidate	Votes	%	±%
Conservative	Thomas Langton Church	12,071		
Liberal	John Frederick Boyd	2,637		
Labour	James Simpson	1,267		

1930 Canadian federal election: Toronto Northwest
Party	Candidate	Votes	%	±%
Conservative	John Ritchie MacNicol	14,343		
Liberal	Farguhar John MacRae	5,513		

== See also ==
- List of Canadian electoral districts
- Historical federal electoral districts of Canada
