= Douglas Morton (politician) =

Canadian politician

Douglas Morton QC
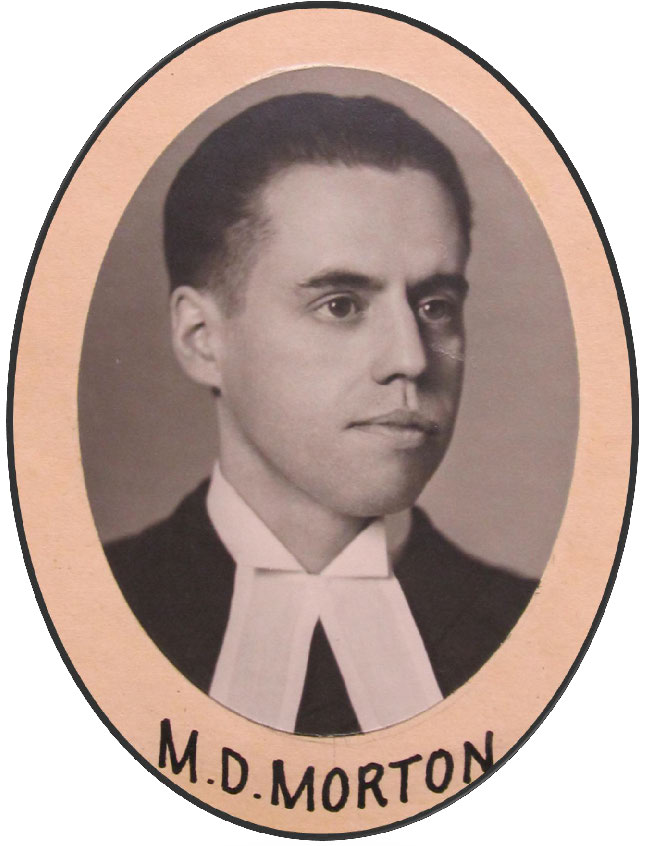
- Morton in 1947

Member of Parliament for Davenport
- In office June 1957 – June 1962
- Preceded by: Paul Hellyer
- Succeeded by: Walter L. Gordon

Personal details
- Born: Murray Douglas Morton; April 28, 1916 Fredericton, New Brunswick, Canada
- Died: November 25, 2001 (aged 85) Stratford, Ontario, Canada
- Party: Progressive Conservative
- Profession: Lawyer

Murray Douglas Morton QC (1916–2001) was a Canadian soldier, lawyer, politician, and judge. He was best known as an elected trustee of the Toronto Board of Education, as federal Member of Parliament for Toronto's Davenport riding, and as a judge in Ontario's Provincial Court (Family Division).

== Personal life and family ==
Murray Douglas Morton was born in Fredericton, New Brunswick, Canada, on April 28, 1916. He was the son of Harry Morton, who owned a grocery store, and Sadie Morton. He had a younger brother, Lloyd, and a younger sister, Doris. Morton moved to Toronto, Ontario, in 1935.

In 1947, Morton married Mona Margaret Aitchison, whom he had met through their mutual involvement in Westmoreland United Church in Toronto; they subsequently had two sons and a daughter: Murray, Bruce and Jean.

Morton died on November 25, 2001, at Spruce Lodge in Stratford, Ontario. Following a funeral service in Barrie, Ontario, his remains were interred at Glendale Memorial Gardens in Rexdale, Ontario.

== Education ==
Morton completed his secondary education at Fredericton High School, after which he attended the Provincial Normal School in Fredericton (but decided not to become a teacher), and then studied for a year at the University of New Brunswick. He next attended University College in the University of Toronto, graduating in 1940 with a Bachelor of Arts degree (BA) in law.

After earning his BA, Morton began the bar admission process, which included taking the non-degree program at Osgoode Hall Law School in Toronto; but this undertaking was interrupted by his military service during World War II. Following the war, he returned and completed the course at Osgoode, graduating in 1947.

Also immediately after the war, Morton concurrently studied at the University of Toronto, Faculty of Law, receiving a Bachelor of Laws degree (LLB) in 1948.

== Military service ==
As an undergraduate student, Morton served in the University of Toronto's contingent of the Canadian Officers' Training Corps (COTC). He later joined the Canadian Active Service Force and served overseas in the UK and northwest Europe, during 1941-45, as a commissioned officer in the 1st Battalion, The North Shore (New Brunswick) Regiment, an infantry unit. Before the end of the war, he had risen to the rank of captain and was the battalion's adjutant.

== Law career ==
Morton was admitted to the Ontario legal profession, as a barrister and solicitor, in 1947. As a lawyer, he focused mainly on civil litigation and family law. In 1954, he established his own law office, which later became the firm of Morton & Malo when he formed a partnership with his former student and associate, George Malo. In 1959, he was appointed Queen's Counsel (QC), which in Ontario was an honorific designation. Morton retired from the practise of law in 1970 upon his appointment to the bench.

== Elected offices ==
In 1952, Morton was elected to the Toronto Board of Education as a trustee, and in 1956 served as the board's chairman.

Morton, a member of the Progressive Conservative Party of Canada, was then first elected to the Parliament of Canada, as Member of Parliament for the Toronto riding of Davenport, in the 1957 general election, defeating Liberal incumbent Paul Hellyer. He was re-elected in the 1958 election. For various periods during his time as an MP, Morton served on the House of Commons Standing Committees for: Banking and Commerce; Public Accounts; Defence Expenditures; and Miscellaneous Private Bills.

Morton's career as an MP ended with the 1962 election, when he was defeated by high profile Liberal candidate Walter L. Gordon. He ran again in the 1963 election in Toronto's York Humber riding, against Liberal incumbent Ralph Cowan, but was unsuccessful.

== Judicial office ==
Morton was appointed to be a judge in Ontario's Provincial Court (Family Division) in 1970. He presided mainly in Simcoe County, with his chambers in Barrie. He dealt with such issues as child custody and access, spousal and child support, child protection and welfare, adoptions, and young persons accused of crimes. He was a moving force behind the creation, in Barrie, of a supportive, home-like residence for youth remanded into pretrial custody (who otherwise would have to be housed in a jail-like facility). When this home opened in 1975, its board of directors named it "Morton House" in honour of Judge Morton's efforts and recognized him as the home's "founder." He retired from the bench in 1986.

== Electoral record ==
1962 Canadian federal election: Davenport
Party	Candidate	Votes	%	±%
Liberal	Walter L. Gordon	9,101	42.6	+11.1
Progressive Conservative	M. Douglas Morton	6,713	31.5	-17.1
New Democratic	Bill Sefton	5,181	24.3	+4.4
Communist	Phyllis Clarke	231	1.1	
Social Credit	Raymond Bell	117	0.5	
Total valid votes		21,343	100.0	

Note: NDP vote is compared to CCF vote in 1958 election.

1958 Canadian federal election: Davenport, Toronto
Party	Candidate	Votes	%	±%
Progressive Conservative	M. Douglas Morton	12,117	48.6	+7.8
Liberal	Paul Hellyer	7,872	31.5	+1.3
Co-operative Commonwealth	F. Andrew Brewin	4,963	19.9	-9.2
Total valid votes		24,952	100.0	

1957 Canadian federal election: Davenport, Toronto
Party	Candidate	Votes	%	±%
Progressive Conservative	M. Douglas Morton	8,989	40.7	-0.4
Liberal	Paul Hellyer	6,665	30.2	-2.1
Co-operative Commonwealth	F. Andrew Brewin	6,414	29.1	+6.2
Total valid votes		22,068	100.0	
