= Elizabeth Rowley =

Canadian communist leader (born 1949)

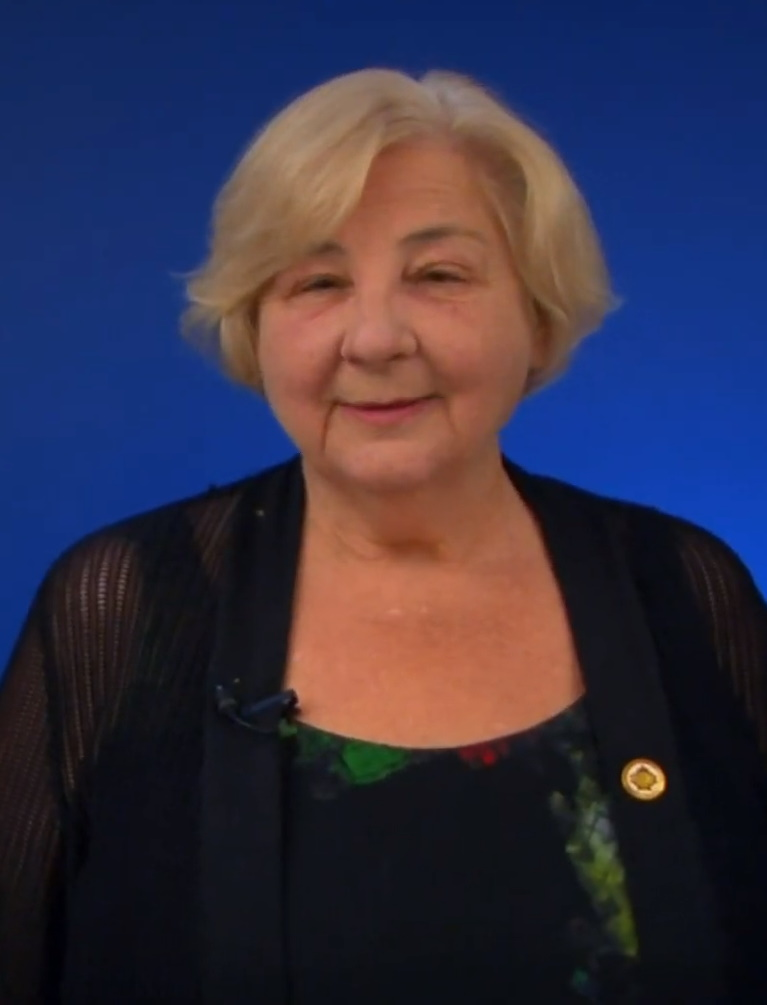

Leader of the Communist Party of Canada
- In office January 31, 2016 – December 7, 2025
- Preceded by: Miguel Figueroa
- Succeeded by: Drew Garvie

Leader of the Communist Party of Canada (Ontario)
- In office 2001–2016
- Preceded by: Hassan Husseini
- Succeeded by: Dave McKee

East York School Board Trustee
- In office 1994–1997

Personal details
- Born: 1949 (age 76–77) British Columbia, Canada
- Party: Communist Party of Canada
- Education: University of Alberta
- Occupation: Politician

Elizabeth Rowley (/ˈroʊli/ ROH-lee; born 1949) is a Canadian writer and political activist who served as the leader of the Communist Party of Canada from 2016 until 2025. She was previously a school trustee in the former Toronto borough of East York. Before becoming leader of the Communist Party of Canada, Rowley was leader of the Communist Party of Ontario from 2001 until 2016. She has been a member of the Central Executive of the Communist Party of Canada since 1978 and has been a perennial candidate at the municipal, federal and provincial levels. Rowley was elected the leader of the Communist Party of Canada by the party's Central Committee in January 2016, following the retirement of Miguel Figueroa. She is the first female leader of the Communist Party of Canada.

== Early life and activism ==
Born in British Columbia in 1949, Rowley attended the University of Alberta in Edmonton, and was active with the Young Communist League of Canada. She joined the Communist Party in 1967. As a young activist, Rowley campaigned against the War Measures Act during the October Crisis in 1970. She was the Party’s youngest candidate in the 1972 federal election, campaigning on issues such as women's reproductive rights, as abortion was then illegal in Canada, as well as calling for an end to the Vietnam War and Canada's participation. After travelling across the country and spending a short time in Quebec, she moved to southern Ontario and worked as a typesetter apprentice and secretary in Windsor, where she became a local party organizer.

In 1975, she became Ontario provincial organizer and moved to Hamilton, where she was involved in local labour and social issues. While campaigning to ban the Ku Klux Klan, Rowley’s apartment was destroyed by arson and, the following year, her car was fire bombed.

In 1978, Rowley stood for a seat on the Hamilton Board of Control in the last election to that body before it was dissolved prior to the city's 1980 election. Early in the campaign, Rowley was formally asked by the city's Streets and Sanitation Department to remove her election signs from public property, as their placement violated a local bylaw During her campaign, she advocated for lower property taxes for homeowners, the construction of affordable housing, and a 20-cent bus fare. She told the Hamilton Spectator that she was opposed to amalgamation, a proposed expansion to the Hamilton Airport, the Upper Ottawa Street dump, and cutbacks to cultural funding. On election night, Rowley finished 6th out of 8 candidates with 13,320 votes.

== Preserving the CPC ==
During the Communist Party's internal dispute following the dissolution of the Soviet Union, Rowley was expelled from the Party by General Secretary George Hewison after she opposed proposals to abandon Marxism-Leninism and liquidate the Communist Party of Canada into a broad-left formation. Later reinstated by the membership, Rowley participated in an initiative to sue Hewison's faction. The resulting legal settlement split the party's assets in half, with the Leninist group keeping the Party name. Over 15 per cent of the membership also left the Party during the split. The Communist Party held a new Central Convention in 1991, at which Rowley was again elected to the party leadership. In 1993, the party had begun another legal challenge to maintain its registration as a political party.

== Communist Party of Canada Ontario leader and school trustee ==
Rowley moved to Toronto in 1988 after being elected leader of the Ontario Committee of the Communist Party. She led the Ontario Committee of the Communist Party in several campaigns, including against the Canada-United States Free Trade Agreement, as well as the 1990 general election.

During the mid-1990s Rowley criticized the cutbacks imposed by Mike Harris Conservative government in Ontario, including the Ontario Days of Action. Around that time, Rowley was elected school trustee in the former Toronto borough of East York for Ward 2. Rowley served until the board was amalgamated in 1997. After her term as school trustee, Rowley returned to the Ontario leadership of the Communist Party of Canada. In 2001, she was again re-elected to the Central Executive Committee of the Communist Party of Canada, and also replaced Hassan Husseini as leader of the Ontario Communist Party.

Rowley has been a regular columnist for the People's Voice, a labour newspaper which describes itself as socialist. Rowley has spoken at international conferences and progressive forums in Europe, America and Asia, and has represented the Communist Party of Canada several times at the International Meeting of Communist and Workers' Parties. She has been outspoken on issues such as the G20 arrests in Toronto, the Rob Ford administration, migrant and immigrant rights in Toronto, for a single, secular school board, for public auto insurance, for peace and anti-racism, and proportional representation.

== Leader of the Communist Party of Canada ==
Rowley was elected Party Leader by the Communist Party of Canada's Central Committee at a meeting in Toronto on January 30, 2016. The change of leadership followed the retirement of Miguel Figueroa, who resigned after serving in the office for 23 years. Although not the first woman to serve in the Communist Party of Canada's leadership, she is the first female leader of the Communist Party of Canada. In the spring of 2016, Rowley launched a 15-city tour of Canada, speaking to members and supporters of the Communist Party of Canada about the Party's upcoming 38th Central Convention and the CPC's campaign against the Trans Pacific Partnership. Rowley retired as leader at the party's December 2025 national convention and was succeeded by Drew Garvie, a former general secretary of the Young Communist League who had been leader of the Communist Party of Ontario since 2019. She was re-elected to the party's executive committee at the same

== Electoral record ==
Election	Constituency	Votes	%	Notes
1972 Canadian federal election	Edmonton—Strathcona	152	0.28%	Communist Party of Canada
1974 Canadian federal election	Windsor—Walkerville	165	0.41%	Communist Party of Canada
1979 Canadian federal election	Hamilton Mountain	102	0.20%	Communist Party of Canada
1980 Canadian federal election	Hamilton Mountain	65	0.13%	Communist Party of Canada
1981 Ontario general election	Hamilton West	260	0.99%	Communist Party of Canada (Ontario)
1984 Canadian federal election	Hamilton East	87	0.23%	Communist Party of Canada
1988 Canadian federal election	Hamilton East	133	0.36%	Communist Party of Canada
1990 Ontario general election	Oakwood	197	1.0%	Communist Party of Canada (Ontario)
1993 Canadian federal election	Broadview—Greenwood	151	0.38%	Independent
1994 Toronto municipal election	Public School Trustee – Ward 2 (East York)	1,357	15.38%	East York Board of Education
1997 Toronto municipal election	Councillor – Ward 1 (East York)	5,707	9%	
1999 Ontario general election	Don Valley East	91	0.22%	Communist Party of Canada (Ontario)
2000 Canadian federal election	Etobicoke North	347	1.08%	Communist Party of Canada
2003 Ontario general election	Scarborough Centre	241	0.58%	Communist Party of Canada (Ontario)
2004 Canadian federal election	Scarborough Southwest	168	0.44%	Communist Party of Canada
2006 Canadian federal election	Scarborough Southwest	120	0.29%	Communist Party of Canada
2007 Ontario general election	Brampton—Springdale	150	0.43%	Communist Party of Canada (Ontario)
2008 Canadian federal election	Windsor West	125	0.32%	Communist Party of Canada
2011 Canadian federal election	Brampton—Springdale	219	0.43%	Communist Party of Canada
2014 Ontario general election	Toronto—Danforth	172	0.40%	Communist Party of Canada (Ontario)
2015 Canadian federal election	Sudbury	102	0.20%	Communist Party of Canada
2019 Canadian federal election	Davenport	137	0.26%	Communist Party of Canada
2021 Canadian federal election	Toronto—Danforth	204	0.43%	Communist Party of Canada
2025 Canadian federal election	Beaches—East York	146	0.25%	Communist Party of Canada
