= Defence, Security and Resilience Bank =

Proposed international financial institution

- Abbreviation: DSR Bank; DSRB
- Type: International financial institution
- Headquarters: Canada
- Region served: Worldwide
- Website: www.dsrb.org

The Defence, Security and Resilience Bank or DSR Bank is a proposed international financial institution backed by the leaders of Canada, Albania, Belgium, Greece, Latvia, Luxembourg, Romania, Turkey and Ukraine. It aims to help allied countries work jointly to fund defence and security-related investments by providing financial support, such as accessible loans to governments. To be headquartered in Canada, with its European Hub in Luxembourg, the DSR Bank will seek to encourage private banks to invest more easily in defence companies, with an overall goal of increasing defence capabilities.

== Overview ==
The DSR Bank was first proposed in 2025 by Rob Murray, chief executive officer of the DSRB Development Group, who previously led the creation of NATO's Defence Innovation Accelerator for the North Atlantic and the NATO Innovation Fund. It had the backing of several financial institutions, including BMO Bank, CIBC, Commerzbank, Deutsche Bank, ING Group, JPMorgan Chase, Landesbank Baden-Württemberg, National Bank of Canada, Piraeus Bank, RBC Capital Markets, Scotiabank, TD Bank Group. Its main focus is supporting European and North American states. The bank considered 40 countries as possible locations for its headquarters. The bank received support in the United Kingdom, with members of parliament Alex Baker and Luke Charters publicly supporting its creation.

Canada has emerged as a major supporter of the bank's creation, with numerous politicians supporting the nation's bid to house the bank. Prime minister Mark Carney gave a speech at the 2026 World Economic Forum in support of Canada's bid. In January 2026, Canada's finance minister François-Philippe Champagne officially declared the country's support for the bid. Following the conclusion of international treaty negotiations in Montreal, in late April, Canada was announced as the location to headquarter the bank, with the support of many Canadian financial institutions including the Royal Bank of Canada, Toronto-Dominion Bank, CIBC, Scotiabank, National Bank of Canada, and Bank of Montreal. Many cities in Canada expressed interest in hosting the bank, with Halifax, Toronto, Montreal, Vancouver, and the National Capital Region emerging as bid cities. In January 2026, defence and security firms based in Ottawa, Ontario, and Gatineau, Quebec, stated their support for the city's bid. Ontario premier Doug Ford stated that his provincial government would support Toronto as Canada's bid city, citing its status as a global financial centre and its pre-existing infrastructure. The incumbent Government of Quebec and mayor Soraya Martinez Ferrada support Montreal's bid, while British Columbia premier David Eby and mayor Ken Sim support Vancouver's bid. Mayors Mark Sutcliffe and Olivia Chow also endorsed their respective cities bids. No clear timeline has been announced on the host city selection.

The United Kingdom's government under Keir Starmer, along with the governments of Finland, the Netherlands, and Poland, proposed the creation of a rival organization, called the Multilateral Defence Mechanism, which was intended to both provide financing and coordinate procurement of defence equipment. Following Andy Burnham's installation as UK prime minister, the Canadian government restarted discussions with the United Kingdom in the hope of convincing it to join the Bank. Other countries including, Lithuania, are continuing to consider joining the Bank. The DSR Bank has identified Australia, Japan and South Korea as priority Indo-Pacific partners, it is hoped will join. On October 25, Burnham stated the UK will not join the DSR Bank.
