= Davenport (federal electoral district) =

Federal electoral district in Ontario, Canada

Coordinates: 43.67°N 79.44°W

Ontario electoral district
- Interactive map of riding boundaries from the 2025 federal election

Federal electoral district
- Legislature: House of Commons
MP
Julie Dzerowicz
Liberal
- District created: 1933
- First contested: 1935
- Last contested: 2025
- District webpage: profile, map

Demographics
- Population (2021): 125,048
- Electors (2025): 92,792
- Area (km²): 12.08
- Pop. density (per km²): 10,351.7
- Census division: Toronto
- Census subdivision: Toronto (part)

Davenport is a federal electoral district in Toronto, Ontario, Canada, that has been represented in the House of Commons of Canada since 1935.

== Demographics ==
The Davenport electoral district has the highest percentage of ethnic Portuguese of all Canadian federal districts (27.4%), and the highest percentage of European immigrants (28.5%, of whom 25.0% are from Southern Europe, and 19.2% from Southern European countries other than Italy), in all of Canada. It also has the highest percentage of native speakers of Portuguese (20.7%) and of Romance languages other than the French language of Canada (32.0%, with many Italian and Spanish). The same holds true for home language (Portuguese: 14.0%; non-French Romance languages: 21.2%, both Canadian riding records)

According to the 2021 Canadian census; 2013 representation

Languages: 54.2% English, 14.3% Portuguese, 4.9% Spanish, 3.4% Italian, 2.3% Yue, 1.6% Vietnamese, 1.5% French, 1.3% Tagalog, 1.1% Mandarin
Religions: 48.2% Christian (35.6% Catholic, 1.9% Christian Orthodox, 1.3% Anglican), 40.5% No religion, 3.4% Jewish, 3% Muslim, 2.3% Buddhist, 1.4% Hindu
Median income (2020): $40,400
Average income (2020): $55,550

Panethnic groups in Davenport (2011−2021)
Panethnic group	2021		2016		2011	
Panethnic group	Pop.	%	Pop.	%	Pop.	%
European (Note: Statistic includes all persons that did not make up part of a visible minority or an indigenous identity.)	68,315	65.23%	71,850	66.9%	67,215	65.87%
African	7,100	6.78%	6,885	6.41%	6,745	6.61%
East Asian (Note: Statistic includes total responses of "Chinese", "Korean", and "Japanese" under visible minority section on census.)	6,975	6.66%	7,770	7.23%	6,590	6.46%
Latin American	6,130	5.85%	5,850	5.45%	6,715	6.58%
Southeast Asian (Note: Statistic includes total responses of "Filipino" and "Southeast Asian" under visible minority section on census.)	5,600	5.35%	5,195	4.84%	6,165	6.04%
South Asian	4,820	4.6%	4,545	4.23%	4,065	3.98%
Indigenous	1,205	1.15%	1,260	1.17%	1,145	1.12%
Middle Eastern (Note: Statistic includes total responses of "West Asian" and "Arab" under visible minority section on census.)	1,185	1.13%	1,025	0.95%	1,140	1.12%
Other/multiracial (Note: Statistic includes total responses of "Visible minority, n.i.e." and "Multiple visible minorities" under visible minority section on census.)	3,410	3.26%	3,015	2.81%	2,255	2.21%
Total responses	104,735	98.86%	107,395	99.01%	102,040	99.69%
Total population	105,946	100%	108,473	100%	102,360	100%
Notes: Totals greater than 100% due to multiple origin responses. Demographics based on 2012 Canadian federal electoral redistribution riding boundaries.

=== 2023 representation ===
According to the 2021 Canadian census

Languages: 58.4% English, 15.1% Portuguese, 5.2% Spanish, 3.5% Italian, 2.3% French, 2.2% Cantonese, 1.6% Vietnamese, 1.6% Tagalog, 1.1% Mandarin
Race: 63.7% White, 7.8% Black, 6.1% Latin American, 4.9% Chinese, 4.5% South Asian, 3.9% Filipino, 2.3% Southeast Asian, 1.1% Indigenous
Religions: 51.1% Christian (37.5% Catholic, 2.0% Christian Orthodox, 1.3% Anglican, 10.3% other), 3.1% Jewish, 3.0% Muslim, 2.1% Buddhist, 1.4% Hindu, 38.0% none
Median income: $39,600 (2020)
Average income: $54,100 (2020)

== Geography ==
The district includes parts of west-end Toronto, and includes the neighbourhoods of Fairbank, Oakwood-Vaughan, St. Clair Gardens, Corso Italia, Dovercourt Village, Bloordale Village, Bloorcourt Village, Brockton Village, the Junction Triangle and the western part of Rua Acores.

== History ==
=== Geography history ===
The federal electoral district of Davenport was created by the Representation Act, 1933 that granted City of Toronto two new seats and converted its directionally named electoral districts and the Parkdale district to long and narrow north-south strips that stretched from the lake to the northern boundary of the city. The Davenport electoral district took in parts of the pre-existing Parkdale (remained) and Toronto Northwest (abolished), covering roughly the area between Dovercourt and Lansdowne north of College Street, and between Dovercourt and Dufferin south of College Street. It was situated between two other long north-south strip-shaped districts, Parkdale to the West and Trinity to the East. The strip-shaped districts were in used until the 1968 federal election, when Representation Order, 1966 took effect.

The 1966 Representation Order converted Davenport to roughly a square bound by Rogers to the north, Glenholme to the east, Bloor to the south, and Keele to the west.

The 1976 Representation Order removed most of Davenport s territory south of Dupont, and extend the district up to Eglinton.

Davenport's contemporary triangular form tracing the CN Rail tracks as its western boundary began to take shape with the 1987 Representation Order, which took effect at the 1988 election. While adjustments had been made since, the portion of the district south of Rogers between the rail tracks and Ossington has remained with the district since then.

From the 1930s to the 1960s, the federal electoral district largely corresponded with the Dovercourt provincial electoral district. The provincial district caught up roughly to the square shape north of Bloor in the 1987 provincial election, just as the federal electoral district was moving toward the new triangular shape. A Davenport provincial electoral district was created in 1999 and it has aligned its boundary to the federal district's until 2025.

From 1988 to 2015, Davenport was geographically the smallest electoral district in Ontario, and was seconded in Canada only to the Papineau electoral district in Montreal. Since the implementation of the 2013 Representation Order at the 2015 federal election, Davenport has been the second smallest electoral district in Ontario after Toronto Centre.

Following the 2022 Canadian federal electoral redistribution, the 2023 Representation Order, implemented in the 2025 federal election, expanded Davenport slightly. The electoral district gained the area south of Eglinton Avenue and east of the CPR from York South—Weston (Keelesdale-Eglinton West), the area south of Vaughan Road and west of Winona Drive from Toronto—St. Paul's (in Oakwood Village), and the area north of Queen Street and west of Ossington Avenue (in Beaconsfield Village) from Spadina—Fort York.

=== Political history ===
==== Overview ====
Since its creation, Davenport's federal representation largely followed the bigger trend of the city of Toronto. In the 28 general elections since its creation in 1933, the conservative claimed five victories in the district's early decades, and the NDP claimed it during the 2011 Orange Crush. The other 22 elections were won by the Liberals.

Before the 1960s, Toronto was a Tory town, and Davenport like its Toronto peers diligently returned Conservative members at every election except for the 1949 and 1953 election, when the Liberals won most of the Toronto seats while the Progressive Conservatives won respectively only 41 and 51 seats across the country.

From the federal election of 1962, Toronto became a Liberal bastion, with Davenport among its most dependable fortress. In the 20 federal general elections since 1962, the Liberals dominated the electoral map of "Old Toronto" (the group of electoral districts generally considered Toronto inner city ridings in the modern era) in 17 elections, haved failed to win the most seat only in three instances: the 1984 and 1988 election that delivered majorities to Mulroney led-Progressive Conservative, and in the 2011 election that delivered a majority to the Harper led Conservatives. Davenport was one of two electoral districts in Old Toronto (the other being Eglinton—Lawrence) that remained solidly Liberals through the Mulroney years.

==== Early Conservative holds ====
At its inaugural election in 1935, Davenport returned incumbent Toronto Northwest MP Progressive Conservative MP John Ritchie MacNicol, and re-elected him in 1940 and 1945. MacNicol was a prominent player in the internal party machinery of the Conservative Party, was one of four honorary chairs of the provincial Conservative Party, the other three being a former prime minister and two former provincial premiers. He served as the national president of the Dominion Conservative Association, the local grassroots arm of the national party, in the early 1940s.

MacNicol was defeated in 1949 by future cabinet minister Paul Hellyer, who at age 26 was the youngest person elected parliament up to that point. He would later becoming a political figure of national prominence, the first cabinet minister to be conferred a formal title, Senior Minister, to signal precedent ahead of all cabinet colleagues except the Prime Minister. He later contested the federal party leadership of both the Liberal and the Conservative parties, and then found a fringe party of his own. He achieved national prominence and notoriety after he lost the Davenport seat in 1957 and re-entered parliament as the MP of neighbouring Trinity. He did however entered cabinet for the first time while MP for Davenport, shortly before he was defeated, as the junior minister of defence in the St. Laurent ministry.

In 1957, Hellyer was defeated by lawyer and Toronto Board of Education Chair Douglas Morton, who served as a Progressive Conservative Member of Parliament for two terms before being defeated in 1962. Morton was later appointed a family court judge.

==== A future deputy prime minister, a finance minister, and a dean of the house ====
Morton was defeated in 1962 by Walter Gordon, who as the finance minister in the Pearson ministry was the standard bearer for expansion of social program and economic nationalism, while also an expenditure management hawk. Gordon was a close personal associate of both Liberal Prime Minister Lester Pearson and former Conservative Premier and federal leader George Drew, who coincidentally represented some small parts of district as the former MPP for High Park. Gordon was a key backer of local provincial Liberal MPP Andrew Thompson's successful provincial leadership bid in 1964, and of Pierre Trudeau's winning 1968 bid for the federal Liberal leadership.

Gordon was succeeded by Charles Caccia, who served as Davenport MP for ten parliamentary terms from 1968 to 2004. Caccia was a prominent voice of the Liberal left focused on environmental issues, and served as the Minister of the Environment in the Second Pierre Trudeau ministry and the Turner ministry. Upon the retirement of former Deputy Prime Minister Herb Grey in 2002, Caccia held the distinction as the Dean of the House, the longest serving member in the House of Commons, during the final two years of his tenure.

==== Red-orange rivalry ====
In late 2003, Charles Caccia, a backer of the leadership bids of Jean Chretien and Sheila Copps over the years, faced an aggressive nomination challenge by a young local city councillor Mario Silva, a supporter of Paul Martin's leadership bid. Facing certain defeat after Martin force led by the youthful Silva trounced Copps force led by the elderly Caccia at the local leadership delegate selection vote 12-to-1, Caccia opted to stood down, and Silva went on to win the 2004 election and served as Davenport's Member of Parliament until 2011.

Liberals Walter Gordon and Charles Caccia (who himself held the seat for nearly 40 years) won the seat by increasing margins, finally culminating in a 17,500-vote majority in 1993. Meanwhile, the opposition parties in the constituency were shifting, and the New Democratic Party candidate beat the Progressive Conservative or Conservative candidate in every election since 1979 except at the most recent 2025 election. The NDP also have encouragements from their success at the provincial level, with provincial NDP leader Marit Stiles having an iron grip on the provincial seat, winning three consecutive election with close to 60% of the vote-share.

In 2011, Andrew Cash of the New Democratic Party won the seat by securing a 20-pt swing against Silva, becoming the first non-Liberal in 49 years to represent the riding. He however only served one term, and was defeated in 2015 by Liberal candidate Julie Dzerowicz with a tight 3-pt margin. Dzerowicz, a long time political advisor, became the first female Member of Parliament for Davenport. Dzerowicz and Cash entered a rematch in 2019, with Dzerowicz scraping a 3-pt victory over Cash again.

==== 2021 Recount ====
Having came within three points of winning in two consecutive elections, and with their fortune rising in the lead up of the 2021 election, Davenport was marked as the top target of the NDP campaign in Toronto. With a robust challenge from NDP candidate Alejandra Bravo (who would go on to become the riding's councillor soon after), the contest was the only one outside of Quebec that went to a judicial recount, in the 2021 cycle. The process certified the 76-vote victory for Dzerowicz.

== Members of Parliament ==
This riding has elected the following members of Parliament:

Parliament	Years	Member	Party
Davenport; Riding created from Parkdale and Toronto Northwest
18th	1935–1940	John Ritchie MacNicol	Conservative
19th	1940–1945	John Ritchie MacNicol	National Government
20th	1945–1949	John Ritchie MacNicol	Progressive Conservative
21st	1949–1953	Paul Hellyer	Liberal
22nd	1953–1957	Paul Hellyer	Liberal
23rd	1957–1958	Douglas Morton	Progressive Conservative
24th	1958–1962	Douglas Morton	Progressive Conservative
25th	1962–1963	Walter L. Gordon	Liberal
26th	1963–1965	Walter L. Gordon	Liberal
27th	1965–1968	Walter L. Gordon	Liberal
28th	1968–1972	Charles Caccia	Liberal
29th	1972–1974	Charles Caccia	Liberal
30th	1974–1979	Charles Caccia	Liberal
31st	1979–1980	Charles Caccia	Liberal
32nd	1980–1984	Charles Caccia	Liberal
33rd	1984–1988	Charles Caccia	Liberal
34th	1988–1993	Charles Caccia	Liberal
35th	1993–1997	Charles Caccia	Liberal
36th	1997–2000	Charles Caccia	Liberal
37th	2000–2004	Charles Caccia	Liberal
38th	2004–2006	Mario Silva	Liberal
39th	2006–2008	Mario Silva	Liberal
40th	2008–2011	Mario Silva	Liberal
41st	2011–2015	Andrew Cash	New Democratic
42nd	2015–2019	Julie Dzerowicz	Liberal
43rd	2019–2021	Julie Dzerowicz	Liberal
44th	2021–2025	Julie Dzerowicz	Liberal
45th	2025–present	Julie Dzerowicz	Liberal

== Election results ==
=== 2025 ===
Polling division map.

Advanced polling division map.

2025 Canadian federal election
Party	Candidate	Votes	%	±%	Expenditures
Liberal	Julie Dzerowicz	35,364	57.81	+14.21	$116,592.71
Conservative	Francis Lavoie	14,189	23.19	+12.34	$7,189.92
New Democratic	Sandra Sousa	10,452	17.09	–22.48	$121.638.04
Green	Lilian Barrera	782	1.28	–1.12	$0.00
Communist	Dave McKee	387	0.63	N/A	$0.00
Total valid votes/expense limit		61,174	65.93	–	$138,313.21
Total rejected ballots		528			
Turnout		61,174	65.91		
Eligible voters		92,792			
Liberal notional hold		Swing		+0.94	
Source: Elections Canada

=== 2021 ===
2021 federal election redistributed results
Party	Vote	%
Liberal	23,206	43.60
New Democratic	21,062	39.57
Conservative	5,777	10.85
PPC	1,738	3.27
Green	1,277	2.40
Others	163	0.31

2021 Canadian federal election
Party	Candidate	Votes	%	±%	Expenditures
Liberal	Julie Dzerowicz	19,930	42.13	-1.59	$101,254.58
New Democratic	Alejandra Bravo	19,854	41.97	+0.95	$102,816.01
Conservative	Jenny Kalimbet	4,774	10.09	+0.84	$6,403.32
People's	Tara Dos Remedios	1,499	3.17	+2.24	$3,001.04
Green	Adrian Currie	1,087	2.30	-2.21	$14,660.32
Independent	Troy Young	86	0.18		none listed
Independent	Chai Kalevar	77	0.16	+0.01	none listed
Total valid votes/expense limit		47,307	99.10	–	$109,525.37
Total rejected ballots		429	0.90	+0.12	
Turnout		47,736	61.07	-4.26	
Eligible voters		78,167			
Source: Elections Canada

=== 2019 ===
2019 Canadian federal election
Party	Candidate	Votes	%	±%	Expenditures
Liberal	Julie Dzerowicz	22,813	43.6	-0.66	$92,294.42
New Democratic	Andrew Cash	21,341	40.8	-0.56	none listed
Conservative	Sanjay Bhatia	5,014	9.6	-0.95	$35,793.71
Green	Hannah Conover-Arthurs	2,341	4.5	+1.41	none listed
People's	Francesco Ciardullo	492	0.9	-	none listed
Communist	Elizabeth Rowley	137	0.3	-0.23	$626.70
Independent	Troy Young	85	0.2	-	none listed
Independent	Chai Kalevar	80	0.2	-0.02	$1,610.25
Total valid votes/expense limit		52,303	100.0		
Total rejected ballots					
Turnout					
Eligible voters		79,822			
Liberal hold		Swing		-0.05	
Source: Elections Canada

=== 2015 ===
2015 Canadian federal election
Party	Candidate	Votes	%	±%	Expenditures
Liberal	Julie Dzerowicz	21,947	44.26	+16.36	$81,434.76
New Democratic	Andrew Cash	20,506	41.36	-12.36	$113,630.62
Conservative	Carlos Oliveira	5,233	10.55	-3.67	$8,821.20
Green	Dan Stein	1,530	3.09	-0.33	$8,434.06
Communist	Miguel Figueroa	261	0.53	–	–
Independent	Chai Kalevar	107	0.22	–	$1,430.00
Total valid votes/expense limit		49,584	100.00		$205,012.65
Total rejected ballots		287	0.58	–	
Turnout		49,871	69.19	–	
Eligible voters		72,082			
Liberal gain from New Democratic		Swing		+14.36	
Source: Elections Canada

2011 federal election redistributed results
Party	Vote	%
New Democratic	20,984	53.72
Liberal	10,897	27.90
Conservative	5,553	14.22
Green	1,335	3.42
Others	294	0.75

2011 Canadian federal election
Party	Candidate	Votes	%	±%	Expenditures
New Democratic	Andrew Cash	21,096	53.74	+22.48	
Liberal	Mario Silva	10,946	27.89	-17.88	
Conservative	Theresa Rodrigues	5,573	14.20	+3.19	
Green	Wayne Scott	1,344	3.42	-7.07	
Communist	Miguel Figueroa	167	0.43	-0.03	
Animal Alliance	Simon Luisi	128	0.33	+0.07	
Total valid votes/expense limit		39,254	100.00		
Total rejected ballots		235	0.60	-0.10	
Turnout		39,489	61.92	+8.88	

2008 Canadian federal election
Party	Candidate	Votes	%	±%	Expenditures
Liberal	Mario Silva	15,953	45.77	-6.10	$47,491
New Democratic	Peter Ferreira	10,896	31.26	-1.35	$55,530
Conservative	Theresa Rodrigues	3,838	11.01	+0.21	$13,993
Green	Wayne Scott	3,655	10.49	+6.79	$12,172
Canadian Action	Wendy Forrest	172	0.49	+0.18	$723
Communist	Miguel Figueroa	160	0.46	+0.02	$432
Animal Alliance	Simon Luisi	92	0.26	–	$957
Marxist–Leninist	Sarah Thompson	87	0.25	-0.01	
Total valid votes/expense limit		34,853	100.00	$79,438	
Total rejected ballots		245	0.70	+0.09	
Turnout		35,098	53.03	-7.58	

2006 Canadian federal election
Party	Candidate	Votes	%	±%
Liberal	Mario Silva	20,172	51.87	+1.18
New Democratic	Gord Perks	12,681	32.61	-1.52
Conservative	Theresa Rodrigues	4,202	10.80	+1.50
Green	Mark O'Brien	1,440	3.70	-0.48
Communist	Miguel Figueroa	172	0.44	+0.03
Canadian Action	Wendy Forrest	122	0.31	+0.02
Marxist–Leninist	Sarah Thompson	103	0.26	+0.02
Total valid votes		38,892	100.00	
Total rejected ballots		240	0.61	-0.22
Turnout		39,132	60.61	+7.72
Elections Canada, Riding of Davenport, Electoral District 35015.

2004 Canadian federal election
Party	Candidate	Votes	%	±%
Liberal	Mario Silva	16,773	50.69	-16.03
New Democratic	Rui Pires	11,292	34.13	+20.57
Conservative	Theresa Rodrigues	3,077	9.30	-4.61
Green	Mark O'Brien	1,384	4.18	+1.66
Marijuana	Elmer Gale	251	0.76	-1.12
Communist	Johan Boyden	137	0.41	
Canadian Action	John Riddell	97	0.29	-0.84
Marxist–Leninist	Sarah Thompson	79	0.24	
Total valid votes		33,090	100.00	
Total rejected ballots		278	0.83	
Turnout		33,368	52.89	
Note: Conservative vote is compared to the total of the Canadian Alliance vote and Progressive Conservative vote in 2000 election.

2000 Canadian federal election, Toronto
Party	Candidate	Votes	%	±%
Liberal	Charles Caccia	17,014	66.7	+0.9
New Democratic	Jordan Berger	3,457	13.6	-4.9
Alliance	Anthony Montenegrino	2,021	7.9	
Progressive Conservative	Eduardo Marcos	1,526	6.0	-4.1
Green	Mark O'Brien	642	2.5	+0.4
Marijuana	Elmer Gale	480	1.9	
Canadian Action	Ann Emmett	288	1.1	
Natural Law	Stephen Porter	73	0.3	
Total valid votes		25,501	100.0	

Note: Canadian Alliance vote is compared to the Reform vote in 1997 election.

1997 Canadian federal election, Toronto
Party	Candidate	Votes	%	±%
Liberal	Charles Caccia	17,195	65.9	-8.0
New Democratic	Chris Masterson	4,807	18.4	+9.4
Progressive Conservative	Adele Pereira	2,628	10.1	+5.5
Green	Richard Procter	551	2.1	+1.2
Canadian Action	Ann Emmett	293	1.1	
Marxist–Leninist	Francesco Chilelli	250	1.0	+0.7
Independent	Miguel Figueroa	194	0.7	
Independent	John Munoro	190	0.7	
Total valid votes		26,108	100.0	

1993 Canadian federal election, Toronto
Party	Candidate	Votes	%	±%
Liberal	Charles Caccia	20,100	73.9	+15.0
New Democratic	John Doherty	2,455	9.0	-9.8
Reform	Michael Jakubcak	2,107	7.7	
Progressive Conservative	Margaret Samuel	1,251	4.6	-14.0
National	Sherelanne Purcell	448	1.6	
Natural Law	Bruce Hislop	283	1.0	
Green	Sat K. Singh Khalsa	255	0.9	
Libertarian	Nunzio Venuto	200	0.7	-1.0
Marxist–Leninist	Barbara Seed	64	0.2	
Abolitionist	Susan Lylliane Pennington	33	0.1	
Total valid votes		27,196	100.0	

1988 Canadian federal election, Toronto
Party	Candidate	Votes	%	±%
Liberal	Charles Caccia	16,436	58.9	+5.2
New Democratic	Anna Menozzi	5,243	18.8	-3.7
Progressive Conservative	Alex Franco	5,179	18.6	-2.6
Libertarian	April Henderson	480	1.7	+0.7
Rhinoceros	Barry Heidt	214	0.8	
Communist	George P. Hewison	196	0.7	0.0
Independent	Heather Robertson	150	0.5	
Total valid votes		27,898	100.0	

1984 Canadian federal election, Toronto
Party	Candidate	Votes	%	±%
Liberal	Charles Caccia	13,248	53.7	-8.8
New Democratic	Manfred Netzel	5,548	22.5	+0.3
Progressive Conservative	Giovanni Rocca	5,217	21.1	+7.5
Green	Elgin Blair	256	1.0	
Libertarian	John Scott Hayes	252	1.0	0.0
Communist	Gordon Massie	165	0.7	+0.2
Total valid votes		24,686	100.0	

1980 Canadian federal election, Toronto
Party	Candidate	Votes	%	±%
Liberal	Charles Caccia	14,545	62.4	+6.5
New Democratic	Ed Brown	5,170	22.2	-2.2
Progressive Conservative	Italo Luci	3,167	13.6	-4.3
Libertarian	Richard Brooke	230	1.0	+0.3
Communist	Gail J. Phillips	117	0.5	0.0
Marxist–Leninist	Richard Daly	72	0.3	0.0
Total valid votes		23,301	100.0	
lop.parl.ca

1979 Canadian federal election, Toronto
Party	Candidate	Votes	%	±%
Liberal	Charles Caccia	12,760	55.9	-3.7
New Democratic	Ed Brown	5,579	24.4	+7.6
Progressive Conservative	Lilliana Edwards	4,090	17.9	-4.1
Libertarian	George J. Dance	156	0.7	
Communist	Gail J. Phillips	117	0.5	-0.1
Marxist–Leninist	Richard Daly	80	0.4	-0.1
Independent	Steve Penner	48	0.2	
Total valid votes		22,830	100.0	

1974 Canadian federal election, Toronto
Party	Candidate	Votes	%	±%
Liberal	Charles Caccia	12,294	59.6	+15.9
Progressive Conservative	Brownie Darubin	4,542	22.0	-8.0
New Democratic	Mairi McElhill	3,476	16.8	-7.8
Communist	Mike Phillips	123	0.6	-0.3
Independent	John Ross Taylor	102	0.5	
Marxist–Leninist	Richard Daly	95	0.5	-0.3
Total valid votes		20,632	100.0	

1972 Canadian federal election, Toronto
Party	Candidate	Votes	%	±%
Liberal	Charles Caccia	9,366	43.7	-6.7
Progressive Conservative	John A. Gillespie	6,442	30.1	+8.0
New Democratic	Angelo Principe	5,272	24.6	-2.9
Independent	William Kashtan	190	0.9	
Independent	Richard Daly	160	0.7	
Total valid votes		21,430	100.0	

1968 Canadian federal election, Toronto
Party	Candidate	Votes	%	±%
Liberal	Charles Caccia	10,736	50.4	-7.9
New Democratic	Otto Bresan	5,865	27.5	+10.3
Progressive Conservative	Ken Dear	4,688	22.0	-1.0
Total valid votes		21,289	100.0	

1965 Canadian federal election, Toronto
Party	Candidate	Votes	%	±%
Liberal	Walter L. Gordon	9,887	58.4	+3.6
Progressive Conservative	Daniel Iannuzzi	3,907	23.1	+0.6
New Democratic	Nelson W. Abraham	2,918	17.2	-4.4
Communist	William Kashtan	224	1.3	
Total valid votes		16,936	100.0	

1963 Canadian federal election
Party	Candidate	Votes	%	±%
Liberal	Walter L. Gordon	11,023	54.7	+12.1
Progressive Conservative	Pauline Miles	4,520	22.4	-9.0
New Democratic	Vic Cathers	4,347	21.6	-2.7
Social Credit	Roland Ring	245	1.2	+0.7
Total valid votes		20,135	100.0	

1962 Canadian federal election
Party	Candidate	Votes	%	±%
Liberal	Walter L. Gordon	9,101	42.6	+11.1
Progressive Conservative	M. Douglas Morton	6,713	31.5	-17.1
New Democratic	Bill Sefton	5,181	24.3	+4.4
Communist	Phyllis Clarke	231	1.1	
Social Credit	Raymond Bell	117	0.5	
Total valid votes		21,343	100.0	

Note: NDP vote is compared to CCF vote in 1958 election.

1958 Canadian federal election, Toronto
Party	Candidate	Votes	%	±%
Progressive Conservative	M. Douglas Morton	12,117	48.6	+7.8
Liberal	Paul Hellyer	7,872	31.5	+1.3
Co-operative Commonwealth	F. Andrew Brewin	4,963	19.9	-9.2
Total valid votes		24,952	100.0	

1957 Canadian federal election, Toronto
Party	Candidate	Votes	%	±%
Progressive Conservative	M. Douglas Morton	8,989	40.7	-0.4
Liberal	Paul Hellyer	6,665	30.2	-2.1
Co-operative Commonwealth	F. Andrew Brewin	6,414	29.1	+6.2
Total valid votes		22,068	100.0	

1953 Canadian federal election, Toronto
Party	Candidate	Votes	%	±%
Liberal	Paul Hellyer	8,919	41.1	+2.1
Progressive Conservative	Harold McBride	6,998	32.3	-3.5
Co-operative Commonwealth	Fred Young	4,968	22.9	-2.3
Labor–Progressive	Hector Harold MacArthur	802	3.7	
Total valid votes		21,687	100.0	

1949 Canadian federal election, Toronto
Party	Candidate	Votes	%	±%
Liberal	Paul Hellyer	11,431	39.0	+10.5
Progressive Conservative	John Ritchie MacNicol	10,476	35.8	-12.9
Co-operative Commonwealth	David B. Archer	7,366	25.2	+6.9
Total valid votes		29,273	100.0	

1945 Canadian federal election, Toronto
Party	Candidate	Votes	%	±%
Progressive Conservative	John Ritchie MacNicol	13,110	48.6	-8.6
Liberal	William Alexander Gunn	7,682	28.5	-14.3
Co-operative Commonwealth	George Eamon Park	4,931	18.3	
Labor–Progressive	Richard W. Robertson	882	3.3	
Social Credit	David Ewald Hartman	346	1.3	
Total valid votes		26,951	100.0	

Note: Progressive Conservative vote is compared to "National Government" vote in 1940 election.

1940 Canadian federal election, Toronto
Party	Candidate	Votes	%	±%
National Government	John Ritchie MacNicol	14,890	57.2	+17.6
Liberal	Neil Cameron	11,140	42.8	+15.0
Total valid votes		26,030	100.0	

Note: "National Government" vote is compared to Conservative vote in 1935 election.

1935 Canadian federal election, Toronto
Party	Candidate	Votes	%
Conservative	John Ritchie MacNicol	10,919	39.6
Liberal	John P. Travers	7,675	27.8
Co-operative Commonwealth	John Williams Bruce	4,766	17.3
Reconstruction	W. Harvey Brown	4,216	15.3
Total valid votes		27,576	100.0

== See also ==
- List of Canadian electoral districts
- Historical federal electoral districts of Canada
