= Business agent (labor) =

A business agent is a title, used in some labor unions, for a leading representative of a local union. It is commonly a paid, full-time position. It can be abbreviated B.A. The duties of a business agent may vary greatly from union to union, but in general, a business agent can be expected to safeguard workers' rights under a collective bargaining agreement and act as a liaison to other representatives higher up in the union organization.

The title is common in labor organizations in the United States and Canada, uncommon elsewhere.
