= 2008 in Canadian music =

This is a summary of the year 2008 in the Canadian music industry.

== Events ==
- April 6 – Juno Awards of 2008 held
- June 12 – 2008 Polaris Music Prize longlist announced
- June 15 – 2008 MuchMusic Video Awards held
- July 7 – 2008 Polaris Music Prize shortlist announced
- September 29 – Caribou's Andorra wins the Polaris Music Prize.

== Albums ==
=== A ===
- Bryan Adams, 11
- Amylie, Jusqu'aux oreilles
- The Awkward Stage, Slimming Mirrors, Flattering Lights

=== B ===
- Jill Barber, Chances
- Matthew Barber, Ghost Notes
- Barenaked Ladies, Snacktime!
- Laura Barrett, Victory Garden
- Daniel Bélanger, Joli chaos
- Billy Talent, 666
- Black Mountain, In the Future
- Bonjour Brumaire, De la Nature des Foules
- Born Ruffians, Red, Yellow & Blue
- Isabelle Boulay, Nos Lendemains
- The Buttless Chaps, Cartography

=== C ===
- Cadence Weapon, Afterparty Babies
- Cancer Bats, Hail Destroyer
- Brendan Canning, Something for All of Us
- Paul Cargnello, Bragging
- Castlemusic, You Can't Take Anyone
- Chic Gamine, Chic Gamine
- Annabelle Chvostek, Resilience
- City and Colour, Bring Me Your Love
- Cœur de pirate, Cœur de pirate
- Ora Cogan, Harbouring
- Jason Collett, Here's to Being Here
- Constantines, Kensington Heights
- Antoine Corriveau, Entre quatre murs
- Crystal Castles, Crystal Castles
- Isabelle Cyr, Isabelle Cyr

=== D ===
- The Dears, Missiles
- Destroyer, Trouble in Dreams
- Die Mannequin, Unicorn Steak
- DL Incognito, A Captured Moment in Time
- Luke Doucet, Blood's Too Rich
- The D'Urbervilles, We Are the Hunters

=== E ===
- Fred Eaglesmith, Tinderbox
- Kathleen Edwards, Asking for Flowers
- Elliott Brood, Mountain Meadows
- André Ethier, Born of Blue Fog

=== F ===
- FemBots, Calling Out
- Forest City Lovers, Haunting Moon Sinking

=== G ===
- Great Big Sea, Fortune's Favour

=== H ===
- Hawk Nelson, Hawk Nelson Is My Friend
- Hayden, In Field & Town
- Hello, Blue Roses, The Portrait Is Finished and I Have Failed to Capture Your Beauty...
- Hey Rosetta!, Into Your Lungs
- Veda Hille, This Riot Life
- Hilotrons, Happymatic
- Human Highway, Moody Motorcycle

=== I ===
- Islands, Arm's Way

=== J ===
- Danko Jones, Never Too Loud

=== K ===
- Kardinal Offishall, Not 4 Sale
- Kalle Mattson, Telescope
- Karkwa, Le volume du vent
- Kellarissa, Flamingo
- Koriass, Les racines dans le béton
- Keith Kouna, Les Années monsieur

=== L ===
- Land of Talk, Some Are Lakes
- Éric Lapointe, Ma peau
- Library Voices, Hunting Ghosts (& Other Collected Shorts)
- The Lost Fingers, Lost in the 80s
- Rob Lutes, Truth & Fiction

=== M ===
- Raine Maida, The Hunters Lullaby
- Catherine Major, Rose sang
- Kate Maki, On High
- Jon McKiel, The Nature of Things
- Sarah McLachlan, Closer: The Best of Sarah McLachlan
- Millimetrik, Northwest Passage's New Era (LP), Keys (EP)
- Ariane Moffatt, Tous les sens
- Alanis Morissette, Flavors of Entanglement

=== N ===
- Nickelback, Dark Horse
- Novillero, A Little Tradition

=== O ===
- One Hundred Dollars, Forest of Tears

=== P ===
- Pas Chic Chic, Au Contraire
- Philémon Cimon, EP 2008
- Dany Placard, Raccourci
- Plants and Animals, Parc Avenue
- Prism, Big Black Sky
- Protest the Hero, Fortress
- The Provincial Archive, Nameless Places

=== R ===
- Rattlesnake Choir, Live Music
- Sam Roberts, Love at the End of the World
- Justin Rutledge, Man Descending

=== S ===
- Said The Whale, Howe Sounds/Taking Abalonia
- Ron Sexsmith, Exit Strategy of the Soul
- Thee Silver Mt. Zion Memorial Orchestra & Tra-La-La Band, 13 Blues for Thirteen Moons
- Crystal Shawanda, Dawn of a New Day
- Simple Plan, Simple Plan
- Zal Sissokho, Silaba
- Sloan, Parallel Play
- Snailhouse, Lies on the Prize
- Spirit of the West, Spirituality 1983-2008: The Consummate Compendium
- Stars, Sad Robots
- The Stills, Oceans Will Rise
- Jeffery Straker, Step Right Up
- Sweatshop Union, Water Street

=== T ===
- Theory of a Deadman, Scars & Souvenirs
- Tokyo Police Club, Elephant Shell
- The Trews, No Time for Later

=== V ===
- Chad VanGaalen, Soft Airplane

=== W ===
- Martha Wainwright, I Know You're Married But I've Got Feelings Too
- Andrée Watters, Minuit
- Wolf Parade, At Mount Zoomer
- Woodhands, Heart Attack
- Hawksley Workman, Between the Beautifuls and Los Manlicious

== Top hits on record ==
=== Top 10 albums ===
These are the top selling albums in Canada. These albums consist of Canadian sales only.

Rank	Artist	Album	Peak position	Sales	Certification
1	Nickelback	Dark Horse	1	480,000	6× Platinum
2	Simple Plan	Simple Plan	2	200,000	Platinum
3	The Canadian Tenors	The Canadian Tenors	22	160,000	2× Platinum
4	Celine Dion	My Love: Essential Collection	2	160,000	2× Platinum
5	City and Colour	Bring Me Your Love	3	80,000	Platinum
6	Cœur de pirate	Cœur de pirate	N/A	80,000	Platinum
7	Sarah McLachlan	Closer: The Best of Sarah McLachlan	3	80,000	Platinum
8	Theory of a Deadman	Scars & Souvenirs	2	80,000	Platinum
9	Sam Roberts	Love at the End of the World	1	50,000	Gold
10	Tara Oram	Chasing the Sun	8	50,000	Gold

=== Top 10 American albums ===
Rank	Artist	Album	Peak position	Sales	Certification
1	Lady Gaga	The Fame	1	560,000	7× Platinum
2	Taylor Swift	Fearless	1	480,000	6× Platinum
3	Kings of Leon	Only by the Night	2	320,000	4× Platinum
4	Pink	Funhouse	3	250,000	2× Platinum
5	Beyoncé	I Am... Sasha Fierce	6	240,000	3× Platinum
6	Britney Spears	Circus	1	240,000	3× Platinum
7	Guns N' Roses	Chinese Democracy	2	240,000	3× Platinum
8	Metallica	Death Magnetic	1	240,000	3× Platinum
9	Katy Perry	One of the Boys	6	200,000	2× Platinum
10	Lil Wayne	Tha Carter III	1	160,000	2× Platinum

=== Top 5 British albums ===
Rank	Artist	Album	Peak position	Sales	Certification
1	Coldplay	Viva la Vida or Death and All His Friends	1	480,000	6× Platinum
2	Adele	19	4	240,000	3× Platinum
3	Seal	Soul	11	80,000	Platinum
4	Bullet for My Valentine	Scream Aim Fire	N/A	40,000	Gold
5	Natasha Bedingfield	Pocketful of Sunshine	13	40,000	Gold

=== Top International albums ===
Rank	Artist	Album	Peak position	Sales	Certification
1	AC/DC	Black Ice	1	400,000	5× Platinum
2	Jesse Cook	Frontiers	N/A	50,000	Gold

=== Canadian Hot 100 Year-End List ===
No.	Artist(s)	Title
1	Timbaland featuring OneRepublic	"Apologize"
2	Leona Lewis	"Bleeding Love"
3	Flo Rida featuring T-Pain	"Low"
4	Madonna featuring Justin Timberlake	"4 Minutes"
5	Katy Perry	"I Kissed a Girl"
6	Lady Gaga featuring Colby O'Donis	"Just Dance"
7	Alicia Keys	"No One"
8	Rihanna	"Disturbia"
9	Coldplay	"Viva la Vida"
10	Rihanna	"Don't Stop the Music"
11	Kardinal Offishall featuring Akon	"Dangerous"
12	Natasha Bedingfield	"Pocketful of Sunshine"
13	Chris Brown	"Forever"
14	Hedley	"For the Nights I Can't Remember"
15	The Pussycat Dolls	"When I Grow Up"
16	Jordin Sparks with Chris Brown	"No Air"
17	Rihanna	"Take a Bow"
18	Colbie Caillat	"Bubbly"
19	Pink	"So What"
20	Metro Station	"Shake It"
21	Miley Cyrus	"See You Again"
22	Sara Bareilles	"Love Song"
23	Hedley	"Never Too Late"
24	Usher featuring Young Jeezy	"Love in This Club"
25	Estelle featuring Kanye West	"American Boy"
26	Kreesha Turner	"Don't Call Me Baby"
27	Jordin Sparks	"Tattoo"
28	Chris Brown	"With You"
29	OneRepublic	"Stop and Stare"
30	Britney Spears	"Piece of Me"
31	Katy Perry	"Hot n Cold"
32	Fergie	"Clumsy"
33	Kanye West	"Stronger"
34	Santana featuring Chad Kroeger	"Into the Night"
35	Feist	"1234"
36	Duffy	"Mercy"
37	Simple Plan	"Your Love Is a Lie"
38	Jordin Sparks	"One Step at a Time"
39	Lil Wayne featuring Static Major	"Lollipop"
40	M.I.A.	"Paper Planes"
41	Sean Kingston	"Take You There"
42	Avril Lavigne	"Hot"
43	Maroon 5 featuring Rihanna	"If I Never See Your Face Again"
44	Ne-Yo	"Closer"
45	Buckcherry	"Sorry"
46	Timbaland featuring Keri Hilson	"The Way I Are"
47	Chris Brown featuring T-Pain	"Kiss Kiss"
48	Leona Lewis	"Better in Time"
49	Fergie	"Big Girls Don't Cry"
50	Linkin Park	"Shadow of the Day"
51	Soulja Boy	"Crank That (Soulja Boy)"
52	Kid Rock	"All Summer Long"
53	Finger Eleven	"I'll Keep Your Memory Vague"
54	3 Doors Down	"It's Not My Time"
55	Mariah Carey	"Touch My Body"
56	Jesse McCartney	"Leavin'"
57	Kevin Rudolf featuring Lil Wayne	"Let It Rock"
58	Britney Spears	"Break the Ice"
59	New Kids on the Block	"Summertime"
60	Coldplay	"Violet Hill"
61	Hedley	"Old School"
62	Simple Plan	"When I'm Gone"
63	Madonna	"Give It 2 Me"
64	Finger Eleven	"Paralyzer"
65	Britney Spears	"Womanizer"
66	Natasha Bedingfield featuring Sean Kingston	"Love Like This"
67	Wyclef Jean featuring Akon, Lil Wayne and Niia	"Sweetest Girl (Dollar Bill)"
68	Janet Jackson	"Feedback"
69	State of Shock	"Money Honey"
70	Lights	"Drive My Soul"
71	Enur featuring Natasja	"Calabria 2008"
72	Flo Rida featuring Timbaland	"Elevator"
73	Plain White T's	"Hey There Delilah"
74	Flo Rida featuring will.i.am	"In the Ayer"
75	David Cook	"The Time of My Life"
76	Jonas Brothers	"Burnin' Up"
77	Yael Naim	"New Soul"
78	Maroon 5	"Won't Go Home Without You"
79	T.I.	"Whatever You Like"
80	Ray J and Yung Berg	"Sexy Can I"
81	Theory of a Deadman	"All or Nothing"
82	Nickelback	"Gotta Be Somebody"
83	Faber Drive	"When I'm with You"
84	Andrew F	"The End"
85	Christina Aguilera	"Keeps Gettin' Better"
86	Miley Cyrus	"7 Things"
87	State of Shock	"Best I Ever Had"
88	John Mayer	"Say"
89	David Archuleta	"Crush"
90	Celine Dion	"Taking Chances"
91	The Ting Tings	"Shut Up and Let Me Go"
92	Elise Estrada	"Unlove You"
93	Gavin DeGraw	"In Love with a Girl"
94	Daughtry	"Feels Like Tonight"
95	Kanye West	"Love Lockdown"
96	Girlicious	"Like Me"
97	Rihanna featuring Jay-Z	"Umbrella"
98	T.I. featuring Rihanna	"Live Your Life"
99	Maroon 5	"Wake Up Call"
100	Rihanna featuring Ne-Yo	"Hate That I Love You"

== Deaths ==
- January 4 – Mort Garson, composer
- February 15 – Willie P. Bennett, folk singer-songwriter
- March 2 – Jeff Healey, blues guitarist
- May 11 – John Rutsey, former drummer for Rush
- July 3 – Oliver Schroer, fiddler and composer

Preceded by 2007 in Canadian music	Canadian music 2008	Succeeded by 2009 in Canadian music
