= Chrome Reflection =

Studio album by Bird
- Released: 2000
- Producer: Andrew Cash

Andrew Cash chronology
Happy to Be Outraged (1995)	Chrome Reflection (2000)	Murder= (2007)

Jason Collett chronology
Chrome Reflection (2000)	Bitter Beauty (2001)

Hawksley Workman chronology
For Him and the Girls (1999)	Chrome Reflection (2000)	(Last Night We Were) The Delicious Wolves (2001)

Professional ratings
Review scores
Source	Rating
Allmusic	4/5 stars

Chrome Reflection is an album released in 2000 by Bird, a one-off band consisting of Jason Collett, Andrew Cash and Hawksley Workman. The album also featured contributions from Lenni Jabour, Josh Finlayson, Gavin Brown, Kevin Fox, Derrick Brady, Peter Kesper, and Mark Kesper.

Several of the songs also appeared in different versions on Collett's subsequent album Motor Motel Love Songs.

== Track listing ==
1. "Choke Cherry" – 3:16
2. "All I've Ever Known" – 2:54
3. "Super Model" – 2:57
4. "Brand New Beggar" – 3:08
5. "Airport" – 3:05
6. "Tiny Ocean of Tears" – 2:29
7. "Madame Pompadour" – 3:53
8. "It Won't Be Long" – 3:18
9. "Too Much" – 3:39
10. "Silent One" – 3:00
11. "Sugar Sugar" – 4:36
12. "Burning Red Transistor Heart" – 4:24
13. "Motor Motel Love Song" – 3:37
14. "Idiot Radio" – 2:14
