= 2010 Polaris Music Prize =

Annual Canadian music award ceremony

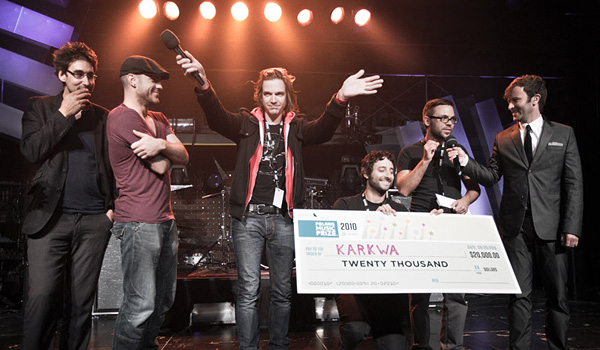
Karkwa at the 2010 Polaris Music Prize gala

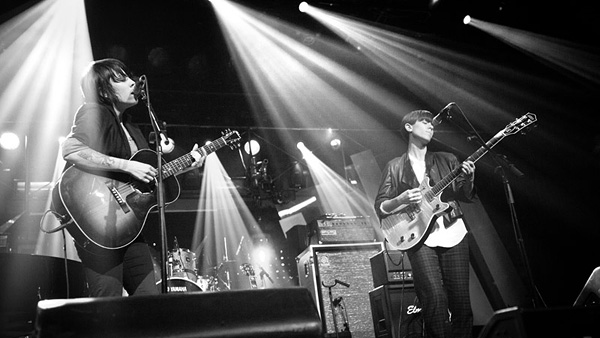
Tegan and Sara at the 2010 Polaris Music Prize gala

The 2010 edition of the Canadian Polaris Music Prize was presented on September 20, 2010. The gala presentation was held at Toronto's Masonic Temple, and was hosted by Grant Lawrence of CBC Radio 3 and Sarah Taylor of MuchMusic.

The winning album, Karkwa's Les Chemins de verre, was the first French language album to win the award.

== Jury ==
The grand jury for the 2010 award included Rob Bowman (York University), Jenny Charlesworth (The Georgia Straight), Leah Collins (Dose.ca), Del Cowie (Exclaim!), Jonathan Dekel (Spinner.ca), Amanda Farrell (Monday Magazine), Jian Ghomeshi (CBC Radio), Marc Xavier Leblanc (freelance journalist and DJ), François Marchand (Vancouver Sun), André Peloquin (BangBang) and Philippe Rezzonico (Rue Frontenac).

== Shortlist ==
The prize's 10-album shortlist was announced on July 6.

- Karkwa, Les Chemins de verre
- The Besnard Lakes, The Besnard Lakes Are the Roaring Night
- Broken Social Scene, Forgiveness Rock Record
- Caribou, Swim
- Dan Mangan, Nice, Nice, Very Nice
- Owen Pallett, Heartland
- Radio Radio, Belmundo Regal
- The Sadies, Darker Circles
- Shad, TSOL
- Tegan and Sara, Sainthood

== Longlist ==
The prize's preliminary 40-album longlist was announced on June 17.

- Apollo Ghosts, Mount Benson
- Bahamas, Pink Strat
- The Besnard Lakes, The Besnard Lakes Are the Roaring Night
- Blue Rodeo, The Things We Left Behind
- Brasstronaut, Mt. Chimaera
- Broken Social Scene, Forgiveness Rock Record
- Basia Bulat, Heart of My Own
- By Divine Right, Mutant Message
- Caribou, Swim
- Jason Collett, Rat a Tat Tat
- Crystal Castles, Crystal Castles
- Amelia Curran, Hunter, Hunter
- Fred Fortin, Plastrer la lune
- Frog Eyes, Paul's Tomb: A Triumph
- Hannah Georgas, This Is Good
- Ghostkeeper, Ghostkeeper
- Holy Fuck, Latin
- Karkwa, Les Chemins de verre
- Lee Harvey Osmond, A Quiet Evil
- Greg MacPherson, Mr. Invitation
- Dan Mangan, Nice, Nice, Very Nice
- Misteur Valaire, Golden Bombay
- The New Pornographers, Together
- Owen Pallett, Heartland
- Plants and Animals, La La Land
- Radio Radio, Belmundo Regal
- Justin Rutledge, The Early Widows
- The Sadies, Darker Circles
- Shad, TSOL
- Elizabeth Shepherd, Heavy Falls the Night
- The Slew, 100%
- Meaghan Smith, The Cricket's Orchestra
- South Rakkas Crew, The Stimulus Package
- Tegan and Sara, Sainthood
- The Wooden Sky, If I Don't Come Home You'll Know I'm Gone
- Hawksley Workman, Meat
- You Say Party! We Say Die!, XXXX
- Young Galaxy, Invisible Republic
- Yukon Blonde, Yukon Blonde
- Zeus, Say Us
