= Lenni Jabour =

Canadian musician (born 1970)

- Born: 1970 (age 55–56)
- Education: Ryerson University
- Occupations: Singer, songwriter

Lenni Jabour

Lenni Jabour (born 1970) is a Canadian singer-songwriter based in Paris and Toronto, who plays "an eclectic mélange of carnival music, torch, folk and pop".

== Early life and education ==
Jabour is half Lebanese, half Canadian. She grew up first in Toronto, until her father died when she was still young, and then she lived in North Bay with her mother and grandparents. She started playing piano at just two years of age, and was subsequently classically trained from the age of three. She studied at The Royal Conservatory of Music and Ryerson University, where she graduated from the drama program.

== Career ==
At age 18, she made her debut as a professional musician, playing jazz standards and the occasional Nick Cave or Kate Bush cover in Toronto bars and coffeehouses.

Her self-titled debut album was released in 1996, and was in the top 100 of the year's Canadian independent albums. Critic Lenny Stoute wrote that it contained "streetwise soul poems and rich melodies."

Her live album, released in 2000, was performed with a string trio at the Toronto venue C'est What.

The Toronto Star described her song "A Little Sad", from the 2006 album Les Dangereuses, as a "sublimely retro pop song", "[s]ingalong melancholy, with horns that evoke a long-lost Burt Bacharach B-side."

She has toured as a supporting act for Blue Rodeo, Amanda Marshall, Holly Cole and Rufus Wainwright. She also played several dates on the Lilith Fair bill in 1998, and has been a guest musician on albums by Jason Collett, Hawksley Workman, I Mother Earth, Glueleg and The Cash Brothers.

== Personal life ==
Jabour is married to Simon Tuplin. They have two children, Nadege and Anik.

== Discography ==
- Lenni Jabour (1996, out of print)
- Demo 2000 (2000, out of print)
- Ten Songs Live (2000, out of print)
- At the Clarion Café (2002, out of print)
- A Small Show of Hands (2003, out of print)
- Les Dangereuses (2006) available on iTunes
- Lenni Jabour : Greatest Hits (covers of hits from the 1970s and 1980s) (2009) available on iTunes
