= Dans la seconde =

Studio album by Karkwa
- Released: September 8, 2023
- Studios: Studio Dandurand; Studio Wild
- Genre: Indie rock
- Length: 33:00
- Label: Simone
- Producer: Karkwa

Karkwa chronology
Karkwa Live (2012)	Dans la seconde (2023)

Dans la seconde is the fifth full-length studio album by Karkwa, released September 8, 2023, on Simone Records. It was the band's first album of new material since 2010's Les Chemins de verre.

The album was preceded by the preview single "Parfaite à l'écran", whose music video featured actress Pascale Bussières.

== Critical response ==
Bruno Coulombe of Exclaim! rated the album eight out of ten, writing that it was strongly influenced by the intervening solo work of lead singer Louis-Jean Cormier and percussionist Julien Sagot rather than feeling like a strict continuation of Karkwa's earlier albums.

Alexandre Vigneault of La Presse rated the album nine out of ten, praising it as containing some of the most evocative and tender songs the band had ever recorded.

== Awards ==
The album was a Juno Award nominee for Francophone Album of the Year at the Juno Awards of 2024, and was a longlisted nominee for the 2024 Polaris Music Prize.

The album won the Félix Award for Rock Album of the Year at the 46th Félix Awards.

== Track listing ==
Dans la seconde track listing
No.	Title	Length
1.	"Ouverture"	2:36
2.	"Parfaite à l'écran"	2:48
3.	"À bout portant"	1:40
4.	"Gravité"	3:49
5.	"Miroir de John Wayne"	3:51
6.	"Nouvelle vague"	5:26
7.	"Dans la seconde"	3:36
8.	"L'Échafaud"	4:33
9.	"Du courage pour deux"	4:53
