= Charlotte Corbeil-Coleman =

Canadian playwright, screenwriter and actor

- Occupations: Playwright, screenwriter, actor
- Notable work: Almost a Full Moon
- Spouse: J. Kelly Nestruck
- Parent(s): Carole Corbeil, Layne Coleman

Charlotte Corbeil-Coleman is a Canadian playwright, screenwriter and actor.

Her 2008 play, Scratch, was a prizewinner in the 2007 Herman Voaden Playwriting Competition, was nominated for the Dora Mavor Moore Award for Outstanding New Play in 2009, and was nominated for the Governor General's Award for English-language drama at the 2010 Governor General's Awards.

Guarded Girls, Corbeil-Coleman's 2019 play about women in the Canadian prison system, premiered at Tarragon Theatre in Toronto and then was performed in Kitchener Waterloo at Green Light Arts, which had originally commissioned it. It received the Dora Mavor Moore Award for Outstanding New Play and was shortlisted for the 2020 Governor General's Award for English-language drama.

In 2022, Corbeil-Coleman's holiday musical Almost a Full Moon, based on Hawksley Workman's Christmas album of the same name, premiered at the Citadel Theatre in Edmonton. Her play The King James Bible Play will have its world premiere at the Stratford Festival in 2026 followed by a run at the National Arts Centre.

Corbeil-Coleman's other work as a playwright includes The End of Pretending (2001); Highway 63: The Fort Mac Show (2009); The CN Tower Show (2012); Sudden Death (2013); and Madame Minister (2024). She co-wrote Twisted (2015) with Joseph Jomo Pierre.

She has also been a writer for the Showcase drama King and the CBC Radio drama series Afghanada.

The daughter of novelist Carole Corbeil and actor Layne Coleman, she has also had acting roles in television, including the series Blue Murder and Show Me Yours. In 2005, she appeared in the television film Mayday. She is married to journalist and critic J. Kelly Nestruck.
