= Safe and Sound =

Safe and Sound or Safe & Sound may refer to:

== Television ==
- "Safe & Sound" (Prison Break), a 2008 episode of TV series Prison Break
- "Safe and Sound" (Electric Dreams), a 2017 episode of anthology TV series Philip K. Dick's Electric Dreams
- "Safe and Sound", an episode of Strange Experiences

== Music ==
- Safe + Sound, an album released by DJ Quik in 1995
- "Safe and Sound" (Capital Cities song), 2011
- "Safe & Sound" (Taylor Swift song), 2012, featuring The Civil Wars from The Hunger Games: Songs from District 12 and Beyond
- "Safe and Sound" (Justice song), 2016
- "Safe and Sound", a song by Azure Ray from their 2001 album Azure Ray
- "Safe and Sound", a song by Electric President from the album The Violent Blue
- "Safe & Sound", a song by Five Man Electrical Band from their 1971 album Good-byes and Butterflies
- "Safe and Sound", a song by Godsmack from their 2006 album IV
- "Safe and Sound", a song by Hawksley Workman from the 1999 album For Him and the Girls
- "Safe and Sound", a song by Hunter (now Cunter) from their 2009 extended play 8
- "Safe and Sound", a song by Idlewild from their 1998 album Hope Is Important
- "Safe and Sound", a song by Kyosuke Himuro featuring Gerard Way for the 2009 film release Final Fantasy VII Advent Children Complete
- "Safe and Sound", a song by MercyMe from their 2006 album Coming Up to Breathe
- "Safe and Sound", a song by French singer Nolwenn Leroy from her 2009 album Le Cheshire Cat et moi
- "Safe and Sound", a song by Rebelution from their 2007 album Courage to Grow
- "Safe and Sound", a song by Sheryl Crow from her 2002 album C'mon, C'mon

== See also ==
- Safe in Sound (disambiguation)
