= Meat (album) =

Studio album by Hawksley Workman
- Released: 2010
- Genre: Indie rock
- Label: Isadora Records
- Producer: Hawksley Workman

Hawksley Workman chronology
Los Manlicious (2008)	Meat (2010)	Milk (2010)

Meat is an album by Hawksley Workman, released January 19, 2010 on Isadora Records and Universal Music Canada. The album debuted at #24 on the Canadian Albums Chart.

The album was a longlisted nominee for the 2010 Polaris Music Prize.

== Track listing ==
1. "Song for Sarah Jane"
2. "French Girl in L.A."
3. "Chocolate Mouth"
4. "Baby Mosquito"
5. "You Don't Just Want to Break Me"
6. "The Government"
7. "Depress My Hangover Sunday"
8. "Tokyo Bicycle"
9. "The Ground We Stand On"
10. "(We Ain't No) Vampire Bats"
11. "We'll Make Time (Even If There Ain't No Time)"
