= Almost a Full Moon =

Studio album by Hawksley Workman
- Released: 2001
- Genre: Indie rock, Christmas music
- Label: Universal Music Canada
- Producer: Hawksley Workman

Hawksley Workman chronology
(Last Night We Were) The Delicious Wolves (2001)	Almost a Full Moon (2001)	Lover/Fighter (2003)

Professional ratings
Review scores
Source	Rating
Allmusic	4.5/5 stars

Almost a Full Moon is a Christmas album by Canadian artist Hawksley Workman released in 2001. The album was written, produced, and performed by Hawksley Workman. It was recorded & mixed at Recall Rooms in Paris, France by Stephane Lumbroso (except "Common Cold" which was recorded & mixed by James Paul at the Rogue, Toronto, Ontario).

The album was re-released in 2002 with new cover art and a new track list by Isadora Records/Universal Music

In 2022, a holiday musical based on the album written by playwright Charlotte Corbeil-Coleman with Workman premiered at the Citadel Theatre in Edmonton.

== Track listing ==
No.	Title	Length
1.	"Claire Fontaine"	3:09
2.	"Learn How to Knit"	3:26
3.	"First Snow of the Year"	3:09
4.	"Merry Christmas (I Love You)"	3:50
5.	"Common Cold"	3:07
6.	"3 Generations"	3:44
7.	"A House or Maybe a Boat"	3:04
8.	"Let's Make Some Soup"

2002 Re-release
No.	Title	Length
1.	"Claire Fontaine"	3:09
2.	"Learn How to Knit"	3:26
3.	"First Snow of the Year"	3:09
4.	"Merry Christmas (I Love You)"	3:50
5.	"Common Cold"	3:07
6.	"3 Generations"	3:44
7.	"A House or Maybe a Boat"	3:04
8.	"Almost a Full Moon"	4:54
9.	"Watching The Fires"	3:40
10.	"Silent Night"	4:36
