= Rat a Tat Tat =

Studio album by Jason Collett
- Released: March 9, 2010
- Genres: Indie rock, alternative country
- Label: Arts & Crafts
- Producers: Carlin Nicholson, Michael O'Brien

Jason Collett chronology
Here's to Being Here (2008)	Rat a Tat Tat (2010)

Professional ratings
Review scores
Source	Rating
AllMusic	3/5 stars
TorontoMusicScene	4/5 stars
Pitchfork	(7.0/10)
Spin	3/5 stars

Rat a Tat Tat is the fifth solo album by Jason Collett of Broken Social Scene. The album was released on March 9, 2010 from record label Arts & Crafts.

The album was produced by Carlin Nicholson and Michael O'Brien of Toronto-based band Zeus, the album features guest musicians Andrew Whiteman, Tony Scherr and Liam O'Neil of The Stills.

In promotion of the album, the label released songs, "Love Is a Dirty Word", in MP3 format.

The album was a longlisted nominee for the 2010 Polaris Music Prize, but it lost to Les Chemins de verre.

"Rat a Tat Tat" placed third in Exclaim! Magazine's annual musical rankings for top Folk & Country albums of 2010. Collett was praised for his irreverence in music making, "this time around, his raspy drawl is a little twangier and his retro detailing a little glossier. Although he pays homage to myriad bygone musical styles, Collett adds a tart twist that turns familiar echoes into fresh sounds."

== Track listing ==
1. "Rave On Sad Songs"
2. "Lake Superior"
3. "Love Is a Dirty Word"
4. "Bitch City"
5. "High Summer"
6. "Cold Blue Halo"
7. "Love Is a Chain"
8. "Long May You Love"
9. "The Slowest Dance"
10. "Winnipeg Winds"
11. "Vanderpool Vanderpool"
