= Milk (album) =

Studio album by Hawksley Workman
- Released: August 10, 2010 (Canada)
- Genre: Indie rock
- Label: Isadora Records, Universal Music Canada
- Producer: Hawksley Workman

Hawksley Workman chronology
Meat (2010)	Milk (2010)	Full Moon Eleven (2011)

Milk is an album by Hawksley Workman, released in 2010.

Unlike his album Meat, which was released in traditional album format on January 19, 2010, Milk was planned for release as a series of digital singles, made available for sale through iTunes and Workman's own website; however, the entire album was erroneously released to iTunes' United States store, but not its Canadian store, in January 2010. The album was officially released in CD format in Canada on August 10, 2010. The album debuted at #57 on the Canadian Albums Chart.

== Track listing ==
1. Animal Behaviour
2. Who Do They Kiss
3. Google Jesus
4. Devastating
5. We Dance to Yesterday
6. Robot Heart
7. Suicidekick (featuring Tosha Dash of Candy Coated Killahz)
8. Warhol's Portrait of Gretzky
9. Stay Drunk and Keep Fucking
10. Snow Angel
11. Some People (featuring Shad)
12. Wayside

Bonus tracks:

1. Not Your Parents' Music
2. Chemical
