= Idols of Exile =

Studio album by Jason Collett
- Released: 2005
- Genre: Indie
- Label: Arts & Crafts
- Producer: Howie Beck

Jason Collett chronology
Motor Motel Love Songs (2002)	Idols of Exile (2005)	Here's to Being Here (2008)

Professional ratings
Review scores
Source	Rating
AllMusic	link
Pitchfork	(7.6/10) link

Idols of Exile is a 2005 album by Jason Collett.

== Track listing ==
1. "Fire" - with Amy Millan
2. "Hangover Days" - with Emily Haines
3. "Brownie Hawkeye"
4. "We All Lose One Another"
5. "Parry Sound"
6. "I'll Bring the Sun"
7. "Tinsel and Sawdust"
8. "Feral Republic"
9. "Pavement Puddle Stars"
10. "Almost Summer"
11. "Pink Night"
12. "These Are the Days"

== Personnel ==
- Ravenna Barker - backing vocals, handclaps
- Howie Beck - production, basses, drums, various other percussion, harmonica
- Chris Brown - clavinet, organ
- Julian Brown - bass
- Brendan Canning - piano, electric guitar, bass
- Andrew Cash - backing vocals, handclaps
- Jason Collett - vocals, guitars
- Evan Cranley - trombone, backing vocals
- Kevin Drew - backing vocals, electric guitar, handclaps
- Bob Egan - pedal steel
- Leslie Feist - backing vocals
- Patrick Gilmour - backing vocals, handclaps
- Emily Haines - vocals
- Gabrielle Hrynkiw - backing vocals, handclaps
- Afie Jurvanen - electric guitar
- Kersti Mcleod - backing vocals, handclaps
- Amy Millan - backing vocals
- Liam O'Neil - synth
- Julie Penner - violin
- Justin Peroff - toms
- Tony Scherr - bass, electric guitar
- James Shaw - trumpet, backing vocals
- Charles Spearin - banjo
- Jason Tait - vibes, glockenspiel, saw, tuning fork
- Paul Taylor - piano
- Andrew Whiteman - guitars, tres
