= Is This What You Call Love? =

Is This What You Call Love? may refer to:

- "Is This What You Call Love?" (Desperate Housewives)
- "Is This What You Call Love?", a song by Stephen Sondheim from Passion and Sondheim on Sondheim
- "Is This What You Call Love?", a 2008 song by Canadian musician Hawksley Workman from Los Manlicious
- "Is This What You Call Love?", a 2006 song by Frankie J from Priceless
