= Reckless Abandon =

Reckless Abandon may refer to:

In music:

- Reckless Abandon (David Bromberg album), 1977
- Reckless Abandon (Andrew F album), 2008
- "Reckless Abandon", a song by Blink-182 from Take Off Your Pants and Jacket
- "Reckless Abandon", a song by It Dies Today from Lividity
- "Reckless Abandon", a song by October Tide from Winged Waltz

In other media:

- "Reckless Abandon" (Charmed), an episode of Charmed
- Reckless Abandon, a 2004 novel by Stuart Woods
- Reckless Abandon, a book by Larry Tomczak

In sports:

- Reckless Abandon (horse) (foaled 2010), a British Thoroughbred racehorse
- Reckless Abandon, a 2007 HDNet Fights MMA event

== See also ==
- Wreckless Abandon, a 2020 studio album by The Dirty Knobs
