= A Brand New Night =

Studio album by The Cash Brothers
- Released: 2003
- Genre: Alternative country/Folk rock
- Length: 42:34
- Label: Zoë

The Cash Brothers chronology
How Was Tomorrow (2001)	A Brand New Night (2003)	Skydiggers/Cash Brothers (2006)

Professional ratings
Review scores
Source	Rating
Allmusic	link

A Brand New Night is the third album by Canadian singer/songwriters The Cash Brothers, released in 2003 on Zoe/Rounder Records. The album features both acoustic and electric guitar work and ballads with vocal harmonies. While continuing to include the country and folk influences of their previous work, this album is oriented more toward pop music. All of the tracks were written by one or the other of the brothers.

== Critical response ==
Reviews of the album praised the duo's harmonies, guitar work and songwriting, but some deemed the album somewhat lacking in new melodic content and innovation compared to previous releases.

== Track listing ==
No.	Title	Length
1.	"Shadow of Doubt"	4:12
2.	"You're It"	3:31
3.	"Give Me Your Hips"	3:56
4.	"Feel Another Way"	4:24
5.	"It's Too Late to Say Goodbye"	3:59
6.	"Fire Dying"	3:32
7.	"Tillsonburg"	4:04
8.	"Forget About the Dust"	3:53
9.	"Sweet"	3:32
10.	"Dealing with the Distance"	4:48
11.	"Into a Brand New Night"	2:43
