= Leif Vollebekk =

Canadian indie folk singer-songwriter

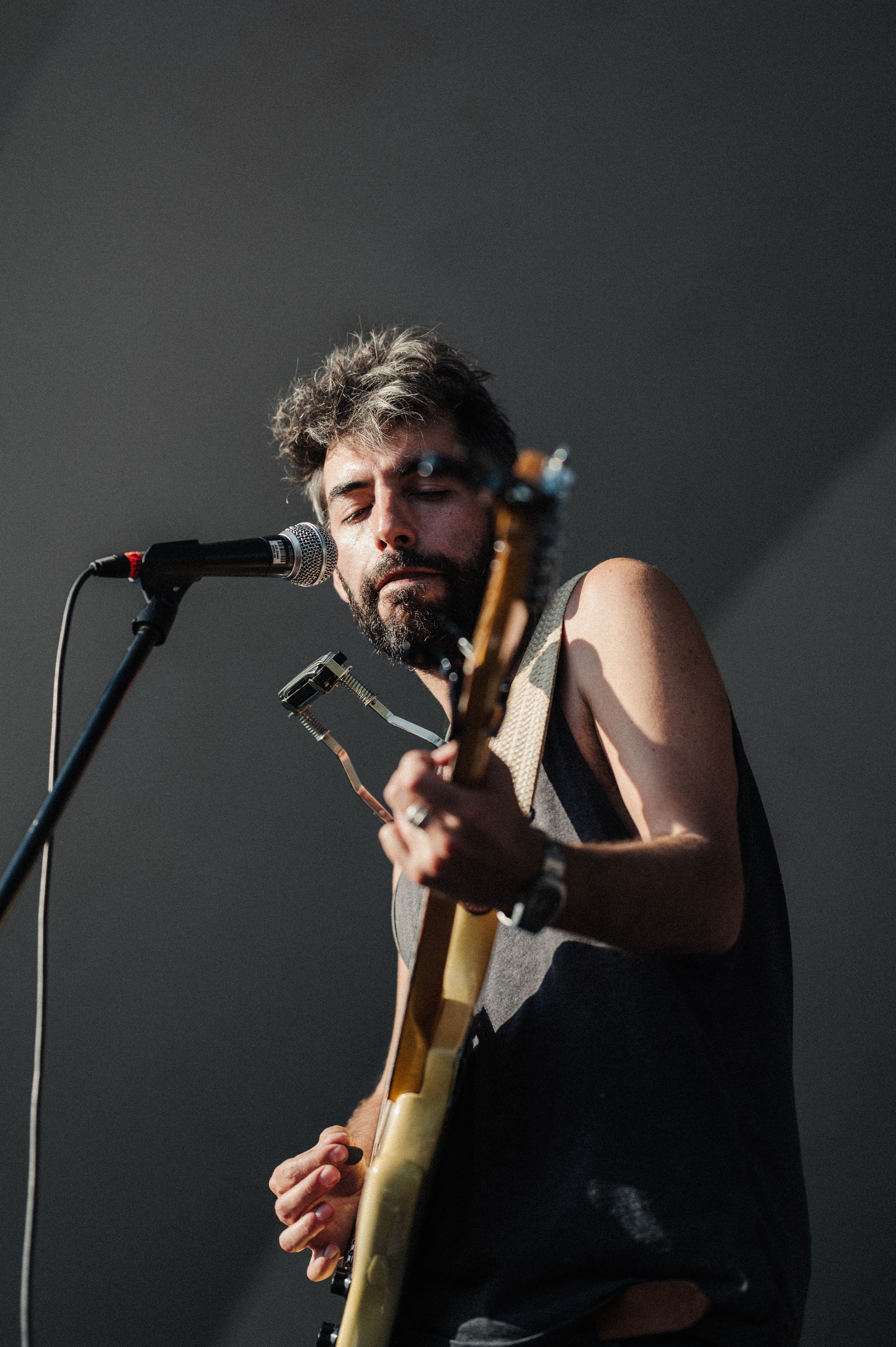
- Vollebekk in 2024

Background information
- Born: Ottawa, Ontario
- Origin: Montreal, Quebec
- Genres: Indie folk
- Occupations: Musician, songwriter
- Instruments: vocals, violin, guitar, piano
- Years active: 2010–present
- Labels: Nevado, Outside, Secret City
- Website: www.leifvollebekk.com

Leif Vollebekk is a Canadian indie folk singer-songwriter, whose 2017 album Twin Solitude was a shortlisted finalist for the 2017 Polaris Music Prize and the 2018 Juno Award for Adult Alternative Album of the Year.

Of mixed Norwegian and French descent and originally from Ottawa, Ontario, he learned to play violin, guitar and piano in childhood. While studying philosophy at the University of Ottawa he spent some time in Iceland on a layover, before moving to Montreal after graduation to pursue his musical career.

== Career ==
=== 2010s ===
His debut album, Inland, was released on Nevado Records in 2010, and incorporated some songs he had written during his trip to Iceland. He followed up with North Americana in 2013 on Outside Music.

He then signed to Secret City Records, which released Twin Solitude in 2017. The album garnered a Juno Award nomination and was shortlisted for a Polaris Music Prize.

All three albums were supported by extensive touring in both North America and Europe.

His fourth album, New Ways, was released November 1, 2019 on Secret City Records. The lead single "Hot Tears" was an Atwood Magazine Editor's Pick.

He also contributed to Piano mal, the 2012 debut album by Julien Sagot.

=== 2020s ===
His album Revelation, mixed by Tchad Blake and mastered by Greg Calbi, was released September 27, 2024. Following a fall EU tour he toured the U.S. in November, and a European tour and further European dates and a Canadian tour were scheduled to follow.

The songs reflected spiritual explorations and dreams during his experience during the COVID-19 lockdowns. Vollebekk produced the album himself and played guitar, bass, piano, harmonica, B3 organ, Moog synthesizer, and accordion.

In 2024 Vollebekk's song "Into the Ether" from his Twin Solitude album was included in Episode 7 of the AppleTV+ series Shrinking.

Revelation received a Juno Award nomination for Adult Alternative Album of the Year at the Juno Awards of 2025.

== Discography ==
- Inland (2010)
- North Americana (2013)
- Twin Solitude (2017)
- New Ways (2019)
- Revelation (2024)
