= Carole Corbeil =

Canadian arts critic and novelist

- Born: 1952; Montreal, Quebec, Canada
- Died: 2000 (aged 47–48); Toronto, Ontario, Canada
- Occupations: Writer; arts critic
- Spouse: Layne Coleman
- Children: Charlotte Corbeil-Coleman
- Writing career
- Period: 1979–2000
- Notable works: Voice-Over; In the Wings
- Notable awards: Toronto Book Award (1993)

Carole Corbeil (1952–2000) was a Canadian arts critic and novelist. She was born in Montreal to Québécois parents. Her writing was informed by the cultural displacement and sense of dual belonging that she experienced when her parents divorced and her mother married an anglophone man.

== Biography ==
Corbeil was raised and educated exclusively in French in childhood, and later transferred to a private English school, Miss Edgar's and Miss Cramp's School, after her mother's remarriage. She spent some time as a teenager studying in Wales under the International Baccalaureate program, before undertaking studies at York University in Toronto.

First known as an arts reporter for The Globe and Mail in the 1980s, she published her debut novel Voice-Over in 1992. The novel centres on a documentary filmmaker from Quebec from childhood through to her adult relationship with an English Canadian poet; although it includes passages in both English and French, one critic praised its code-switching as "done in such a clever way that the French is understandable to a person with only the basic vocabulary." Voice-Over was shortlisted for the Books in Canada First Novel Award and the Trillium Book Award, and was a co-winner with David Donnell's China Blues of the Toronto Book Award in 1993.

In the 1990s, she wrote a weekly arts column for the Toronto Star. She was also a contributor to This Magazine, Canadian Art and Saturday Night, and won two National Magazine Awards for her writing.

She published her second novel, In the Wings, in 1997. The novel centred on the relationship between actors playing Hamlet and Gertrude in a stage production of Hamlet. A stage adaptation of In the Wings by Nicky Guadagni was staged by Toronto's Theatre Passe Muraille in 2002.

Corbeil was married to actor Layne Coleman. Their daughter, Charlotte Corbeil-Coleman, is an actor and playwright.

Corbeil died in Toronto in 2000 of cancer.
