= Los Manlicious =

Studio album by Hawksley Workman
- Released: 2008
- Genre: Indie rock
- Label: Universal Music Canada
- Producer: Hawksley Workman, Doc, Andre Wahl, Bob Ezrin, John Southworth, Ken Friesen, Matt DeMatteo, James Paul

Hawksley Workman chronology
Between the Beautifuls (2008)	Los Manlicious (2008)	Meat (2010)

Los Manlicious is a studio album by Canadian musician Hawksley Workman released in May 2008 in Europe and on August 26, 2008, in Canada.

The record was recorded in the same sessions as Between the Beautifuls and Workman intended to release it first, but Universal Music preferred to release the mellower album first. Los Manlicious is a return to Hawksley's heavier rock roots, resembling his major label debut, (Last Night We Were) The Delicious Wolves more than his two previous albums, Treeful of Starling and Between the Beautifuls. As well as Workman himself (credited as HW), several producers were enlisted for this album: Doc, Andre Wahl, Bob Ezrin, John Southworth, Ken Friesen, Matt DeMatteo, James Paul.

The first single from this album is 'When You Gonna Flower?'.

Los Manlicious' final track, "Fatty Wants to Dance" has been remixed by The Paronomasiac.

While on tour in Europe supporting the record, Workman recorded videos for 8 of its 13 tracks. These videos were shot on location in various cities on the tour and can be watched on YouTube or on Hawksley Workman's Facebook page.

== Track listing ==
1. "When You Gonna Flower?" - 3:18
2. "Is This What You Call Love?" - 3:23
3. "Girls on Crutches" - 4:25
4. "Kissing Girls (You Shouldn't Kiss)" - 4:15
5. "It's a Drug" - 3:47
6. "In My Blood" - 2:39
7. "Lonely People" - 4:27
8. "Piano Blink" - 2:23
9. "The City is a Drag" - 4:20
10. "In the Bedroom in the Daytime" - 2:44
11. "Prettier Face" - 4:01
12. "Oh You Delicate Heart" - 5:06
13. "Fatty Wants To Dance" - 4:15
