= Le Volume du vent =

Studio album by Karkwa
- Released: April 1, 2008
- Genre: Indie rock
- Length: 49:40
- Label: Audiogram

Karkwa chronology
Les Tremblements s'immobilisent (2005)	Le Volume du vent (2008)	Les Chemins de verre (2010)

Le Volume du vent is the third studio album by Canadian indie rock group Karkwa, released in 2008. The album's title literally translates as "The Volume of the Wind".

Guest musicians on the album include Patrick Watson, Marie-Pierre Arthur and Elizabeth Powell.

The album was a longlisted nominee for the 2008 Polaris Music Prize.

On May 7, 2014, the album was certified gold by Music Canada.

== Track listing ==
No.	Title	Length
1.	"Le Compteur"	5:19
2.	"Deux lampadaires"	3:10
3.	"Échapper au sort"	3:26
4.	"Oublie pas"	3:26
5.	"Le Frimas"	1:14
6.	"Le Temps mort"	3:00
7.	"La Façade"	4:27
8.	"Mieux respirer"	4:10
9.	"Combien"	4:05
10.	"Le Volume du vent"	2:05
11.	"Le Solstice"	5:35
12.	"Dormir le jour"	5:17
13.	"À la chaîne"	4:26
