= Boomtown (Andrew Cash album) =

Studio album by Andrew Cash
- Released: 1989
- Studio: Reflection Sound, Charlotte, NC
- Genre: Roots rock
- Label: Island Records
- Producer: Don Dixon

Andrew Cash chronology
Time and Place (1988)	Boomtown (1989)	Hi (1993)

Boomtown is a 1989 album by Andrew Cash. The video for the title track won the Juno Award for best video. It reached #57 in Canada, August 14, 1989.

== Track listing ==
All tracks written by Andrew Cash unless otherwise noted.

1. "100 Years" – 3:22
2. "Boomtown" – 4:10 (Angus/Cash)
3. "What Am I Gonna Do With These Hands" – 3:37
4. "Sleepwalking" – 2:35
5. "These Days" – 3:43
6. "Nothing At All" – 3:50
7. "We Have Heard" – 4:23
8. "Wishing" – 3:53
9. "Times Talkin' Trouble Now" – 4:30
10. "Any Kind Of Love" – 3:19
11. "When The Rain Falls Down" – 4:43

== Personnel ==
- Graydon Nichols – electric guitar, dobro, vocals
- Glenn Milchem – drums and percussion
- Paul Taylor – bass guitar, vocals
- Jim Ediger – piano, Hammond organ, accordion, fiddle, vocals
- Andrew Cash – vocals, electric and acoustic guitars
