= Valaire (band) =

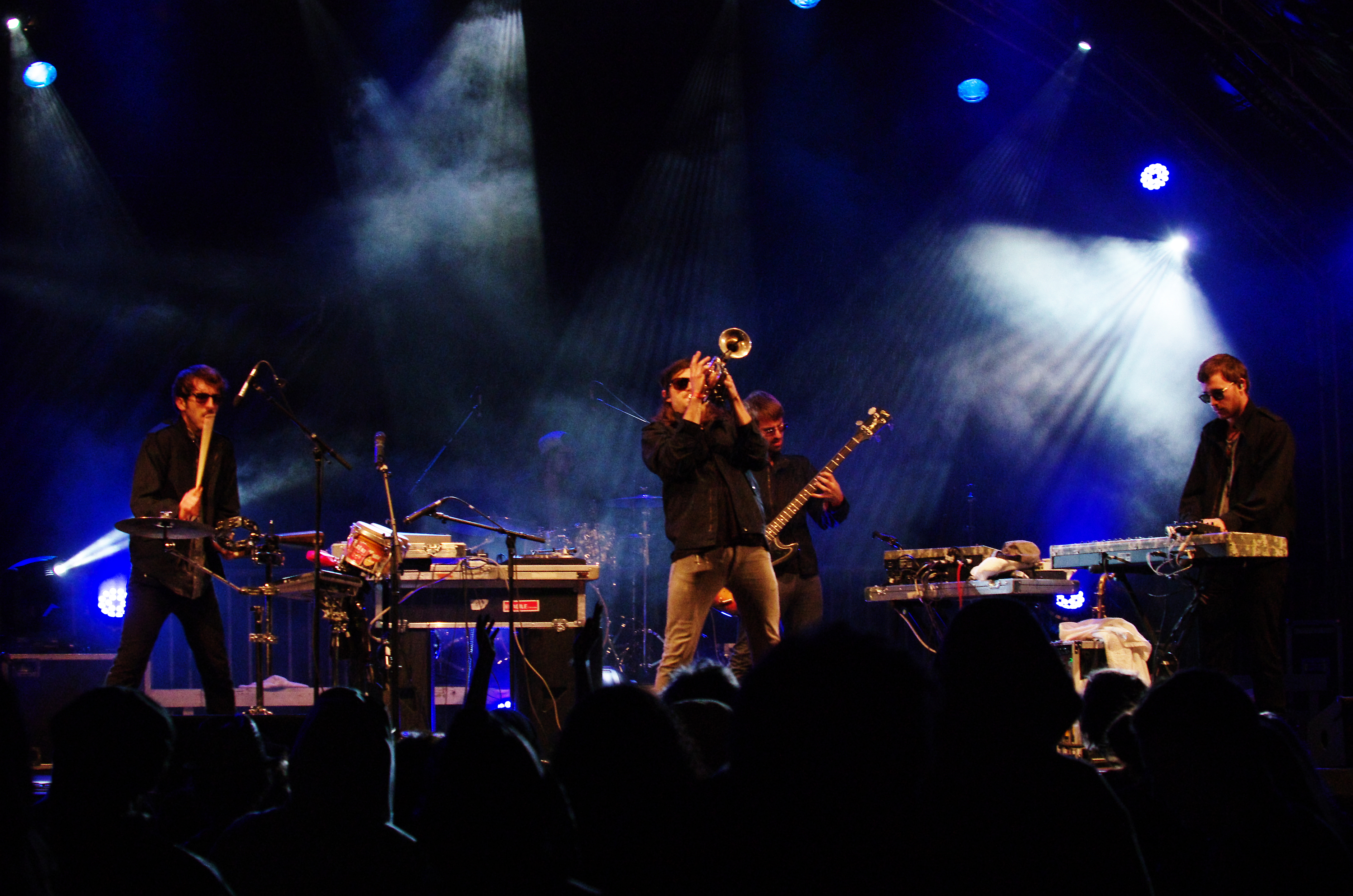
- Performing at Traumzeit Festival 2013 in Duisburg, Germany

Background information
- Origin: Sherbrooke, Quebec, Canada
- Genres: Pop, Electro, Electro-jazz, Hip hop
- Years active: 2005–present
- Label: Indica Records
- Members: François-Simon Déziel; Jonathan Drouin; Julien Harbec; Thomas Hébert; Louis-Pierre Phaneuf
- Website: www.valaire.mu

Valaire, formerly known as Misteur Valaire, are a French Canadian electropop group based in Sherbrooke, Quebec and later Montreal.

== History ==
The five members of Misteur Valaire met in elementary school. They all had classic jazz musical training before becoming interested in electronic music. In CEGEP, in 2003, the group participated in the local Vocational Schools Final performing at Cégep de Sherbrooke. They formed the band Misteur Valaire in 2005, and recorded an album, Mr. Brian. A second album, Friterday Night was released in 2007.

Misteur Valaire performed regularly in Montreal and toured around Quebec. The band released an album, Golden Bombay in 2010, with several guest singers. The album was a longlisted nominee for the 2010 Polaris Music Prize, and the band were shortlisted for the Juno Award for New Group of the Year at the Juno Awards of 2011.

In 2013, the band release an album, Bellevue. By 2016, the band had changed its name to Valaire.

In 2018, Valaire performed at the Emerging Music Festival in Abitibi-Témiscamingue, and also released a video for their single "The Coast".

== Discography ==
=== Studio albums ===
- Mr. Brian, 2005, CD, Music download, Mr. Label, 8+1 tracks
- Friterday Night, 2007, CD, Music download, Mr. Label, 11 tracks
- Golden Bombay, 2010, CD, LP, Music download, Mr. Label, 11 tracks
- Bellevue, 2013, CD, LP, Music download, Mr. Label, 11+1 tracks
- Oobopopop, 2016, CD, LP, Music download
- Jazz Futon, 2023, CD, LP, Music download

=== Live albums ===
- Misteur Valaire Live @ Montreal, 2012, Music download, Mr. Label, 12 tracks
