= Safe in Sound =

Safe in Sound may refer to:

- Safe in Sound (Jim Boggia album)
- Safe in Sound (Lower Than Atlantis album)
- "Safe in Sound", a song by Sub Focus from his 2013 album Torus
- Safe-in-Sound Award

== See also ==
- Safe and Sound (disambiguation)
