= Lover/Fighter =

Studio album by Hawksley Workman
- Released: September 2003
- Genre: Indie rock
- Length: 53:40
- Label: Universal Music Canada
- Producer: Hawksley Workman

Hawksley Workman chronology
Almost a Full Moon (2002)	Lover/Fighter (2003)	Before We Were Security Guards (2004)

Professional ratings
Review scores
Source	Rating
Allmusic	2.5/5 stars

Lover/Fighter is an album by Canadian artist Hawksley Workman, released in 2003. The album debuted at #33 on the Canadian Albums Chart.

== Track list disc: 1 ==
1. "We Will Still Need a Song" – 3:50
2. "Even An Ugly Man" – 4:46
3. "Wonderful and Sad" – 3:51
4. "Anger as Beauty" – 5:43
5. "No Reason to Cry Out Your Eyes (On the Highway Tonight)" – 3:16
6. "Tonight Romanticize the Automobile" – 4:29
7. "The Future Language of Slaves" – 6:19
8. "Smoke Baby" – 6:08
9. "Autumn's Here" – 4:59
10. "Ilfracombe" – 5:06 (Bonus Track)
11. "Addicted" – 5:13 (Bonus Track)
12. "A Knife in the Country (Edit)" – 4:46
  - European Bonus Track Only
13. "Lust" – 8:22
  - European Bonus Track Only
14. "Where It Used to Snow" – 3:17
  - European Bonus Track Only

== Track list disc: 2 ==
1. "Jealous of Your Cigarette" (Video - live)
2. "Your Beauty Must be Rubbing Off" (Video - live)
3. "The Making of Lover/Fighter" (Video)
