= Layne Coleman =

Canadian actor, playwright and theatre director

- Born: North Battleford, Saskatchewan, Canada
- Occupations: Actor, director, playwright
- Notable work: Blue City Slammers

Layne Coleman is a Canadian actor, playwright and theatre director, most noted as a former artistic director of Theatre Passe Muraille. Originally from North Battleford, Saskatchewan, he first became prominent as a co-founder and artistic director of the 25th Street Theatre in Saskatoon in the 1980s.

== Career ==
=== Directing ===
He briefly stepped in as interim artistic director of Theatre Passe Muraille in 1991 following the departure of Brian Richmond, holding the role for about a year before he was succeeded by Susan Serran in early 1992; he stepped in again as interim artistic director in 1997 after Serran left, and was named the permanent artistic director the following year. Michael Healey's The Drawer Boy, the first play he booked for the theatre, became one of the most critically and commercially popular Canadian plays of the decade. Coleman held this role with Theatre Passe Muraille until 2007.

In addition to 25th Street Theatre and Theatre Passe Muraille, he has also directed plays for Factory Theatre, Canadian Stage Company and the National Arts Centre.

=== Acting ===
Coleman's stage roles as an actor have included productions of Lips Together, Teeth Apart and Oleanna at Canadian Stage; The Life and Times of Mackenzie King, Inquest, Adult Entertainment, The End of Civilization and Escape from Happiness at Factory Theatre; The Ecstasy of Rita Joe for the Western Canada Theatre; Goodness for Volcano Theatre and Heaven Above, Heaven Below with Theatre Passe Muraille.

He has also had supporting or guest roles in the television films War Brides, Ready for Slaughter, Best of Both Worlds, A Matter of Sex, The Marriage Bed, Glory! Glory! and Giant Mine; the television series Harvest, Night Heat, Street Legal, E.N.G., Wind at My Back and This Is Wonderland; and the theatrical films Humongous and Abraxas, Guardian of the Universe.

=== Writing ===
As a playwright, his plays have included Blue City Slammers, Tijuana Cure and Highway 63.

Coleman co-wrote the screenplays for the film adaptation of Blue City Slammers (1987) and The Shape of Rex (2013), with the latter film serving as his film directorial debut.

== Awards ==
He received several Dora Mavor Moore Award nominations for his performances in The Al Cornell Story, Public Lies, As I Lay Dying and The Walls of Africa. He has won two honorary Doras, including the George Luscombe Award for mentorship in 2005 and the Silver Ticket for outstanding contributions to the development of Canadian theatre.

== Personal life ==
He was married to writer Carole Corbeil before her death in 2000; his theatrical play Tijuana Cure is about her treatment for and death of cancer. Their daughter, Charlotte Corbeil-Coleman, is an actor and playwright.
