= Andrew F =

Canadian musician

Andrew Franks
- Born: December 28, 1990 (age 35); Calgary, Alberta, Canada
- Genres: Pop rock
- Occupation: Singer-songwriter
- Instruments: Drums, guitar
- Years active: 2008–present
- Label: Newboy Productions
- Website: andrew-f.com

Andrew F (born December 28, 1990) is a Canadian Pop/Rock singer and songwriter born in Calgary, Alberta, Canada.

== Early life ==
Andrew F started playing the drums at the age of 14 when he joined his first band Thirty Years' War. He has also been frontman for a few other pop punk bands.

== Music ==
Andrew F released his debut single "The End" which ended up becoming a huge success, peaking at Number 10 on the Canadian Hot 100 based on the large number of digital downloads, which was certified gold by the Music Canada months later. He first worked on demos at Music Center Canada Recording Studios with producer Daron Schofield, but later on all turned out into full production recordings, which would be on his debut album Reckless Abandon. The album was released on May 22, 2008, and the whole entire album was written and sung by Andrew F alone. Andrew F's style of music is Pop, Rock, Folk, and Acoustic. He also plays drums, and the guitar (both acoustic and electric). In 2012, Andrew F joined a newly formed rock band called The Ashley Hundred.

== Discography ==
=== Albums ===
| Year | Information | Canada |
|---|---|---|
| 2008 | Reckless Abandon: First studio album; Released: May 22, 2008; Label: Newboy Productions; Format: CD | 71 |

=== Singles ===
| Year | Title | Chart Positions | Album |
| Year | Title | CAN | Album |
|---|---|---|---|
| 2008 | "The End" | 10 | Reckless Abandon |
