= Between the Beautifuls =

Studio album by Hawksley Workman
- Released: 29 January 2008
- Recorded: 2007
- Genre: Indie rock
- Length: 51:58
- Label: Universal Music Canada
- Producer: Andre Wahl

Hawksley Workman chronology
Puppy (A Boy's Truly Rough) (2006)	Between the Beautifuls (2008)	Los Manlicious (2008)

Professional ratings
Review scores
Source	Rating
Montreal Gazette	4/5 stars
Metro News	3.5/5 stars
AnE Vibe	4/5 stars
Calgary Sun	3.5/5 stars

Between the Beautifuls is a studio album by Canadian musician Hawksley Workman released on 29 January 2008. The new album was announced along with a track listing on Workman's official website. The first single off the album is "Piano Blink", which premiered on CBC Radio One's Here and Now on 14 November 2007 and reached number one on the R3-30 the week of 27 March 2008.

== Track listing ==
1. "All the Trees Are Hers" - 3:33
2. "Alone Here (Ballad of Bunches of Things)" - 4:26
3. "It’s Not Me" - 3:55
4. "No Stillness and No Rain" - 3:52
5. "Oh You Delicate Heart" - 5:05
6. "Piano Blink" - 3:57
7. "Pomegranate Daffodil" - 4:19
8. "Prettier Face" - 3:57
9. "September Lily" - 3:46
10. "The City Is a Drag" - 4:36
11. "What Would You Say to Me, Lord?" - 5:27
12. "Piano Blink (Los Manlicious mix)" (bonus track) - 3:19
