= Pas Chic Chic =

Canadian indie pop group

Pas Chic Chic were a Canadian indie pop group, whose album Au Contraire was a longlisted nominee for the 2008 Polaris Music Prize. A side project led by Roger Tellier-Craig of Godspeed You! Black Emperor and Fly Pan Am, the band's music was a psychedelic spin on francophone musical traditions such as yé-yé and chansonnier pop.

The band featured Tellier-Craig and Marie-Douce St-Jacques on vocals, along with guitarist Radwan Moumneh, bassist Éric Gingras and drummer Éric Fillion. The album was released in April 2008 on Semprini Records.
