= How Was Tomorrow =

Studio album by The Cash Brothers
- Genre: Alternative country/Folk rock
- Label: Zoe

The Cash Brothers chronology
Phonebooth Tornado (2000)	How Was Tomorrow (2001)	A Brand New Night (2003)

Professional ratings
Review scores
Source	Rating
Allmusic	4/5 stars

How Was Tomorrow is the third album by Canadian singer-songwriters The Cash Brothers. The album features alt-country and alt-folk ballads with vocal harmonies, accompanied by acoustic and some electric guitar work.

== History ==
In 1997 the Andrew and Peter Cash began writing and performing songs. They recorded their music at Chess Records, and in 1999 they released an album, Raceway on their own label, Four Court Records. After the brothers had released a second album in 2000, Raceway came to the attention of Rounder Records. The album was updated and re-released in 2001 on Zoe/Rounder Records in the US and in Europe under the title How was Tomorrow.

The pair toured with a backup band in the UK, Netherlands and the US in support of the album. The touring musicians were Gord Tough on electric guitar, drummer Randy Curnew, bassist Paul Taylor and keyboardist Todd Lumley.

== Critical reception ==
The album was generally well received. Reviews of the album praised the duo's harmonies, innovative guitar work and songwriting.

== Track listing ==
How was Tomorrow
No.	Title	Length
1.	"Raceway"	2:43
2.	"Take a Little Time"	3:24
3.	"Nebraska"	3:45
4.	"The Only One"	3:02
5.	"Nerve"	3:24
6.	"Show Me the Reason"	3:59
7.	"Night Shift Guru"	4:14
8.	"Guitar Strings and Foolish Things"	3:08
9.	"Awkward Game"	4:10
10.	"I Am Waiting"	4:12
11.	"Dream Awake"	3:36

Bonus Tracks!
No.	Title	Length
12.	"Hallucination"
13.	"Saturday In June"
14.	"Birds Fly"
15.	"Luckiest In The World"
