= Andrew Cash =

Canadian singer-songwriter and politician (born 1962)

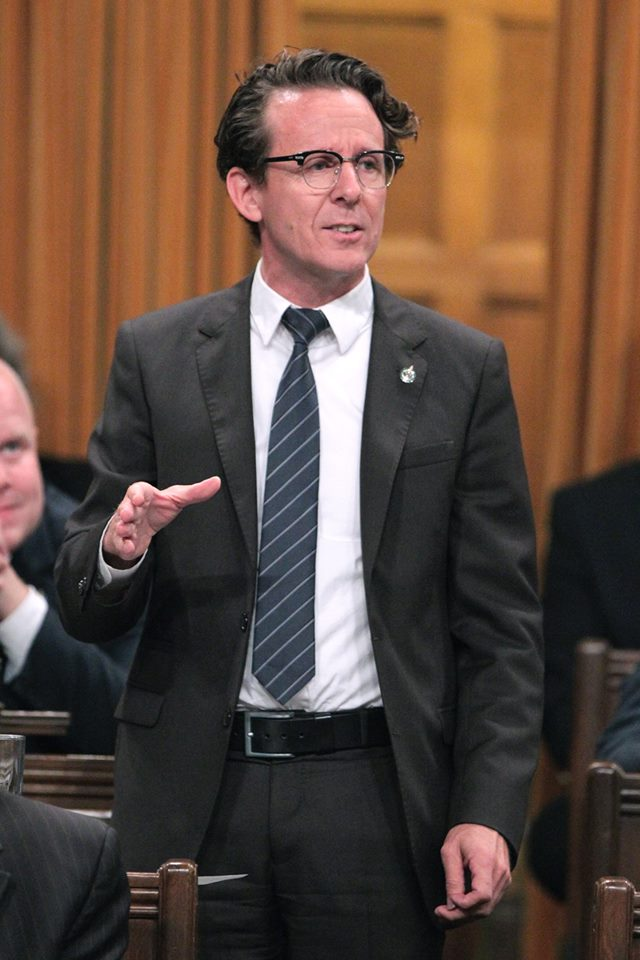

Member of Parliament for Davenport
- In office May 2, 2011 – October 19, 2015
- Preceded by: Mario Silva
- Succeeded by: Julie Dzerowicz

Personal details
- Born: January 22, 1962 (age 64) Toronto, Ontario, Canada
- Party: New Democratic Party
- Spouse: Michelle Shook
- Children: 4
- Occupation: Musician
- Profession: Journalist
- Website: andrewcash.net

Andrew Cash
- Genres: Rock
- Instruments: Vocals, guitar
- Years active: 1982–2011

Andrew Cash (born January 22, 1962) is a Canadian singer-songwriter and former politician who was the member of Parliament (MP) for the Toronto-area riding of Davenport from 2011 to 2015. A member of the New Democratic Party (NDP), Cash grew up in Toronto where he and Charlie Angus founded the Toronto punk band L'Étranger. In the late 1990s he wrote for the Toronto weekly Now.

== Music career ==
When L'Étranger broke up in 1986, Cash signed to Island Records as a solo artist. His first release on the label was a reissue of L'Étranger's last recording, Sticks and Stones. He released three albums as a solo artist, including Boomtown, which appeared on the RPM 100 Top Albums chart in 1989. He had a number of hits, including "Time and Place", "Boomtown", "What Am I Gonna Do with These Hands", "Smile Me Down" and "A Lot of Talk". In 1993, his album Hi was recorded at Metalworks Studios in Mississauga, Ontario.

He then formed the band Ursula, who released the album Happy to Be Outraged in 1995. However, that band was not successful, and broke up after just the one album.

Around the same time as Ursula's demise, however, his brother Peter Cash also decided to leave his band, Skydiggers. Both available at the same time for the first time in their careers, Andrew and Peter decided to write and record together, and released their debut album as The Cash Brothers, Raceway, in 1999.

Since 1999, Cash provided the soundtrack music for various television shows, mostly Canadian. He also wrote for the Toronto-based Now magazine. In 2000, he collaborated with Hawksley Workman and Jason Collett on Chrome Reflection, an album credited to Bird. In 2007, Cash released his latest solo album Murder=.

== Political career ==
On October 5, 2009, Cash was nominated as the New Democratic Party's candidate for the Toronto-area Davenport electoral district, in preparation for the 41st Canadian general election. At the time, the House of Commons was controlled by a Conservative minority government, led by Prime Minister Stephen Harper, that could fall at any time; in this unpredictable election situation Cash was a candidate for over a year and half.

When the election was called, on March 26, 2011, his main campaign issue was that Davenport's incumbent MP, Mario Silva, was not a "full-time" MP. Cash campaigned with two main slogans, "Cash for Toronto" and "Trade your Silva for Cash", with a focus on "issues of precarious employment, especially with regards to freelancers and people who are working serial contracts." Near the end of April, both The Toronto Star and The Globe and Mail newspapers started to predict that Cash might win, ending 49 years of continuous Liberal representation for that electoral district. The election campaign concluded on May 2, with the Conservatives gaining enough seats to win a majority government and the NDP enough seats to become Official Opposition. In Davenport, Cash defeated Silva, becoming a caucus colleague of his former bandmate Charlie Angus, who has been the MP for Timmins-James Bay since 2004.

Cash lost his seat in the general election held October 19, 2015, one of many New Democrats who were swept away when the Liberal Party came from third place to form a majority government; Liberal Julie Dzerowicz succeeded him as MP for Davenport. In the 2019 federal election, he attempted to win his seat back, coming second to Dzerowicz.

== Post-political career ==
He was appointed president and chief executive officer of the Canadian Independent Music Association in 2021.

== Discography ==
- Time and Place (1988) (#57 CAN)
- Boomtown (1989) (#57 CAN)
- Hi (1993)
- Happy to Be Outraged (1995, credited to Ursula)
- Chrome Reflection (2000, credited to Bird)
- Murder= (2007)

== Electoral record ==
2019 Canadian federal election: Davenport
Party	Candidate	Votes	%	±%	Expenditures
Liberal	Julie Dzerowicz	22,813	43.6	-0.66	$92,294.42
New Democratic	Andrew Cash	21,341	40.8	-0.56	none listed
Conservative	Sanjay Bhatia	5,014	9.6	-0.95	$35,793.71
Green	Hannah Conover-Arthurs	2,341	4.5	+1.41	none listed
People's	Francesco Ciardullo	492	0.9	-	none listed
Communist	Elizabeth Rowley	137	0.3	-0.23	$626.70
Independent	Troy Young	85	0.2	-	none listed
Independent	Chai Kalevar	80	0.2	-0.02	$1,610.25
Total valid votes/expense limit		52,303	100.0		
Total rejected ballots					
Turnout					
Eligible voters		79,822			
Liberal hold		Swing		-0.05	
Source: Elections Canada

2015 Canadian federal election: Davenport
Party	Candidate	Votes	%	±%	Expenditures
Liberal	Julie Dzerowicz	21,947	44.26	+16.36	$81,434.76
New Democratic	Andrew Cash	20,506	41.36	-12.36	$113,630.62
Conservative	Carlos Oliveira	5,233	10.55	-3.67	$8,821.20
Green	Dan Stein	1,530	3.09	-0.33	$8,434.06
Communist	Miguel Figueroa	261	0.53	–	–
Independent	Chai Kalevar	107	0.22	–	$1,430.00
Total valid votes/expense limit		49,584	100.00		$205,012.65
Total rejected ballots		287	0.58	–	
Turnout		49,871	69.19	–	
Eligible voters		72,082			
Liberal gain from New Democratic		Swing		+14.36	
Source: Elections Canada

2011 Canadian federal election: Davenport
Party	Candidate	Votes	%	±%	Expenditures
New Democratic	Andrew Cash	21,096	53.74	+22.48	
Liberal	Mario Silva	10,946	27.89	-17.88	
Conservative	Theresa Rodrigues	5,573	14.20	+3.19	
Green	Wayne Scott	1,344	3.42	-7.07	
Communist	Miguel Figueroa	167	0.43	-0.03	
Animal Alliance	Simon Luisi	128	0.33	+0.07	
Total valid votes/expense limit		39,254	100.00		
Total rejected ballots		235	0.60	-0.10	
Turnout		39,489	61.92	+8.88	
