= 2008 Polaris Music Prize =

Annual Canadian music award ceremony

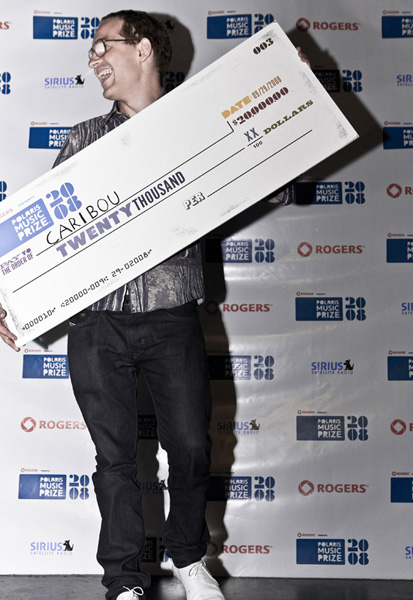
Caribou at the 2008 Polaris Music Prize gala

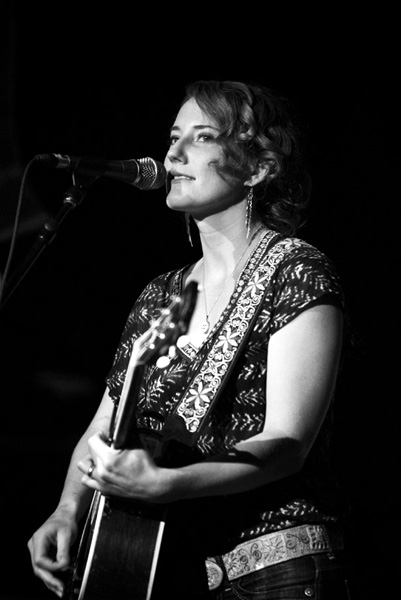
Kathleen Edwards at the 2008 Polaris Music Prize gala

The 2008 edition of the Canadian Polaris Music Prize was presented on September 30, 2008, at the Phoenix Concert Theatre in Toronto. The prize was won by Caribou for his album Andorra.

Unlike in prior years, the Polaris Prize committee did not release a compilation album of songs from the nominated albums. Instead, customers who purchased one of the nominated albums in a record store were given a free card entitling them to download one free song from each album at iTunes.

== Jury ==
The 2008 grand jury consisted of Mike Bell (Calgary Herald), Denise Benson (Eye Weekly), Evelyn Cote (Ici), Lana Gay (CBC Radio 3), Kevin Kelly (Newfoundland Herald), Joshua Ostroff (AOL Canada), James Stewart Reaney (London Free Press), Li Robbins (CBC Radio/The Globe and Mail), Hannah Simone (MuchMusic), Darryl Sterdan (Winnipeg Sun) and Frank Yang (Chromewaves).

== Shortlist ==
The prize's 10-album shortlist was announced on July 7.

- Caribou, Andorra
- Black Mountain, In the Future
- Basia Bulat, Oh, My Darling
- Kathleen Edwards, Asking for Flowers
- Holy Fuck, LP
- Plants and Animals, Parc Avenue
- Shad, The Old Prince
- Stars, In Our Bedroom After the War
- Two Hours Traffic, Little Jabs
- The Weakerthans, Reunion Tour

== Longlist ==
On June 12, for the first time in the three-year history of the award, the preliminary 40-album longlist was published.

- The Acorn, Glory Hope Mountain
- Attack in Black, Marriage
- Black Mountain, In the Future
- Born Ruffians, Red, Yellow & Blue
- Buck 65, Situation
- Basia Bulat, Oh, My Darling
- Cadence Weapon, Afterparty Babies
- Cancer Bats, Hail Destroyer
- Caribou, Andorra
- City and Colour, Bring Me Your Love
- Constantines, Kensington Heights
- Crystal Castles, Crystal Castles
- Destroyer, Trouble in Dreams
- Fred Eaglesmith, Tinderbox
- Kathleen Edwards, Asking for Flowers
- Christine Fellows, Nevertheless
- Gatineau, Gatineau
- Hayden, In Field & Town
- Veda Hille, This Riot Life
- Hilotrons, Happymatic
- Holy Fuck, LP
- Islands, Arm's Way
- Karkwa, Le Volume du vent
- Corb Lund, Horse Soldier! Horse Soldier!
- The New Pornographers, Challengers
- Pas Chic Chic, Au Contraire
- Sandro Perri, Tiny Mirrors
- Plants and Animals, Parc Avenue
- Ghislain Poirier, No Ground Under
- Protest the Hero, Fortress
- Justin Rutledge, Man Descending
- The Sadies, New Seasons
- Shad, The Old Prince
- Socalled, Ghetto Blaster
- Stars, In Our Bedroom After the War
- Tegan and Sara, The Con
- Thee Silver Mt. Zion Memorial Orchestra and Tra-La-La Band, 13 Blues for Thirteen Moons
- Two Hours Traffic, Little Jabs
- The Weakerthans, Reunion Tour
- Wintersleep, Welcome to the Night Sky
