= Julien Sagot =

Canadian musician

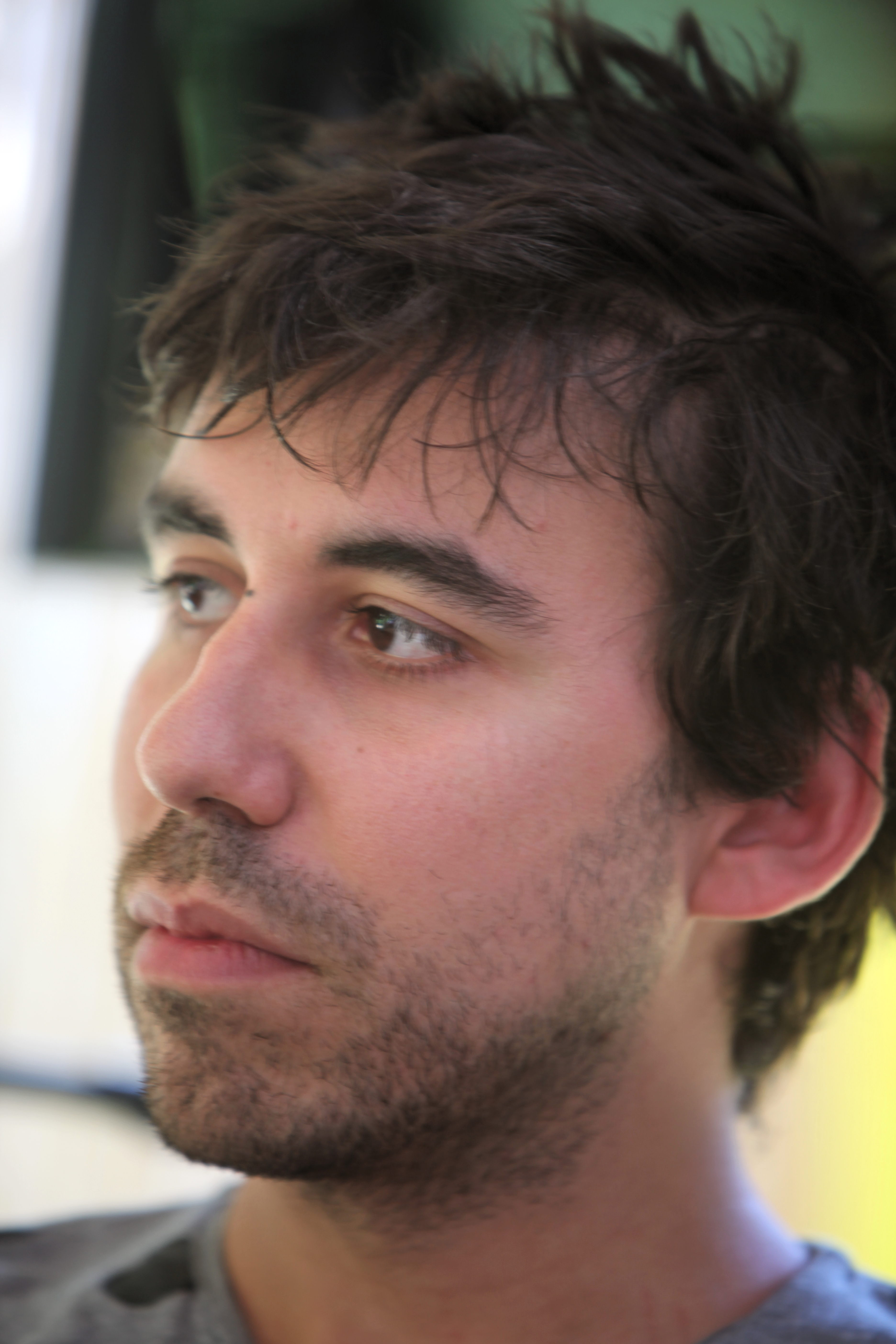

Background information
- Also known as: Sagot
- Genres: indie rock
- Years active: 1990s-present
- Member of: Karkwa

Julien Sagot is a Canadian musician. Formerly a percussionist for the indie rock band Karkwa from 1998 to 2012, since that band's breakup he has released four albums as a solo singer-songwriter.

Born in Paris, France, Sagot moved to Montreal, Quebec, with his family at age 13. At age 16 he met François Lafontaine, with whom he went on to be one of the founding members of Karkwa.

After Karkwa was put on hiatus in 2012, Sagot released his debut solo album Piano mal, which included contributions from Simon Angell of Thus Owls and singer-songwriter Leif Vollebekk. He followed up with the albums Valse 333 in 2014, Bleu Jane in 2017, and Sagot in 2021.

Valse 333 was a Juno Award nominee for Francophone Album of the Year at the Juno Awards of 2015, and Sagot was longlisted for the 2021 Polaris Music Prize. In 2015, Sagot and cowriter Antoine Binette Mercier received a SOCAN Songwriting Prize nomination for the song "Ficelle".

== Discography ==
- Piano mal (2012)
- Valse 333 (2014)
- Bleu Jane (2017)
- Sagot (2021)
