= Here's to Being Here =

Studio album by Jason Collett
- Released: February 5, 2008
- Genres: Indie rock; alternative country
- Label: Arts & Crafts
- Producer: Howie Beck

Jason Collett chronology
Idols of Exile (2005)	Here's to Being Here (2008)	Rat a Tat Tat (2010)

Professional ratings
Review scores
Source	Rating
AllMusic	3.5/5 stars
Pitchfork	(7.4/10)

Here's to Being Here is the fourth solo album by Jason Collett of Broken Social Scene. The album was released on February 5, 2008 on Arts & Crafts.

Produced by Howie Beck, the album features guest musicians Andrew Whiteman, Tony Scherr and Liam O'Neil of The Stills.

In promotion of the album, the label released two songs, "Out of Time" and "Charlyn, Angel of Kensington", in MP3 format.

== Track listing ==
1. "Roll On Oblivion"
2. "Sorry Lori"
3. "Out of Time"
4. "Papercut Hearts"
5. "Henry's Song"
6. "Charlyn, Angel of Kensington"
7. "No Redemption Song"
8. "Through the Night These Days"
9. "Nothing to Lose"
10. "Not over You"
11. "Somehow"
12. "Waiting for the World"
