= Hilotrons =

Canadian indie pop band

- Origin: Ottawa, Ontario, Canada
- Genres: indie rock
- Years active: 2001–present
- Members: Mike Dubue; Philip Shaw Bova; Pascal OfLaki; Philippe Charbonneau; Alex Moxon; Adam Saikaley
- Past members: Paul Hogan; Damian Sawka; Mike Schultz
- Website: hilotrons.com

Hilotrons is a Canadian indie pop band from Ottawa, Ontario. The band's members include Mike Dubue, Philip Shaw Bova, Pascal OfLaki, Philippe Charbonneau, and Alex Moxon. Adam Saikaley is an occasional member.

Initially an electronic dance music band, they began to incorporate a blend of pop styles into their sound. Their breakthrough album, Happymatic (2008), was a longlisted nominee for the 2008 Polaris Music Prize.

== Discography ==
- Hilotrons (2003)
- Bella Simone (2006)
- Happymatic (2008)
- At Least There's Commotion (2013)
- To Trip With Terpsichore (2015)
- Lonely Cinema (2020)
