= Reckless Abandon (Andrew F album) =

Studio album by Andrew F
- Released: May 22, 2008
- Recorded: 2008
- Genre: Pop rock
- Label: Newboy Productions
- Producer: Daron Schofield

Singles from Reckless Abandon
- 1. "The End" Released: 2008

Reckless Abandon is the debut album by Andrew F. It was released on "May 22, 2008", and it received a small number of sales in its first week released, causing it to debut at #71 on the Canadian Albums Chart. The first released single "The End" peaked at #10 on the Canadian Hot 100 based on the number of downloads, and has been certified gold by the CRIA.

== Track listing ==
All songs were written by Andrew F.

#	Title	Length
01	"Crash And Burn"	3:39
02	"Imperfections"	3:56
03	"The Thing She Says"	3:56
04	"Sick"	3:26
05	"Just Friends"	4:00
06	"Between H and J"	3:10
07	"Tragedy"	3:58
08	"So Small"	4:31
09	"Remember"	4:21
10	"The End"	3:08

== Chart positions ==
Chart (2008)	Peak position
Canadian Albums Chart	71
