= Karkwa =

Canadian rock band

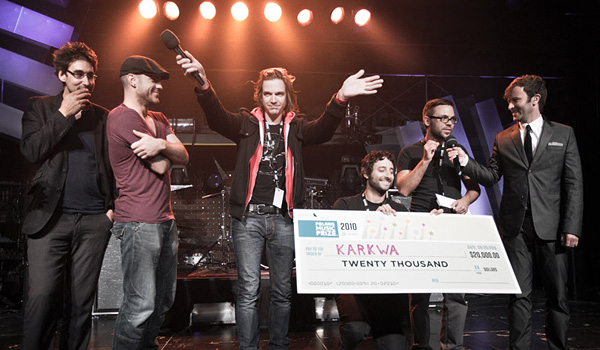
- Karkwa receiving the 2010 Polaris Music Prize (Photo: Dustin Rabin)

Background information
- Origin: Montreal, Quebec, Canada
- Genres: Indie rock
- Years active: 1998–2011, 2018, 2023–present
- Label: Audiogram
- Members: Louis-Jean Cormier; François Lafontaine; Martin Lamontagne; Julien Sagot; Stéphane Bergeron
- Website: (in French) karkwa.com

Karkwa is an indie rock band from Montreal, Quebec, Canada, formed in 1998.

== History ==
Formed in 1998, the group consists of vocalist and guitarist Louis-Jean Cormier, keyboardist François Lafontaine, bass guitarist Martin Lamontagne, percussionist Julien Sagot, and drummer Stéphane Bergeron. The band's name is a phonetic rendering of carquois (French for a quiver of arrows).

After reaching the final stages of the Francouvertes contest in 2001, the band released its debut album, Le Pensionnat des établis, in 2003. The album's single "Poisson cru" reached the top of Quebec's campus radio charts, and was named the best album of the year by two critics for Montreal's alternative weekly Voir.

The band's second album, Les Tremblements s’immobilisent, won three Félix Awards in 2006. In 2007, they were featured, along with The Stills, The Besnard Lakes and Mahjor Bidet, on the bill of Quebec Scene, a concert in Ottawa sponsored by CBC Radio 3.

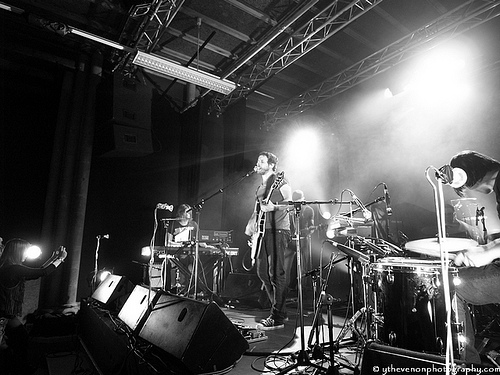
Concert in Metz, France, 2009

On the third album, Le Volume du vent, as the band further expanded its reach into English Canada, guest musicians included Patrick Watson and Elizabeth Powell. The album was a longlisted nominee for the 2008 Polaris Music Prize.

Their fourth album, Les Chemins de verre, was recorded in Paris, France. The album won the 2010 Polaris Music Prize and the 2011 Juno Award for Francophone Album of the Year.

In December 2011, the band announced that it would release a live album in 2012, followed by a hiatus. The album debuted at number 25 on the Canadian Albums Chart.

Lead singer Louis-Jean Cormier released his debut solo album, Le treizième étage, in 2012. The album won Francophone Album of the Year at the Juno Awards of 2013. In June 2013, Le treizième étage was longlisted for the 2013 Polaris Music Prize. Percussionist Julien Sagot has also released the solo albums Piano mal (2012), Valse 333 (2014), Bleu Jane (2017), and Sagot (2021).

On July 7, 2018, the band performed a reunion show at the La Noce festival in Saguenay.

In 2023, they announced that they had reunited to record and release a new album, Dans la seconde, for release in September. The announcement was accompanied by the release of the album's first preview single, "Parfaite à l'écran", whose music video featured actress Pascale Bussières. The album received a Juno nomination for Francophone Album of the Year at the Juno Awards of 2024, and was a longlisted nominee for the 2024 Polaris Music Prize.

== Members ==
=== Present ===
- Stéphane Bergeron – drums (1998–2012, 2023–present)
- Louis-Jean Cormier – guitars and vocals (1998–2012, 2023–present)
- François Lafontaine – keyboards and acoustic guitar (1998–2012, 2023–present)
- Martin Lamontagne – bass guitar (2001–2012, 2023–present)
- Julien Sagot – percussions and vocals (1998–2012, 2023–present)
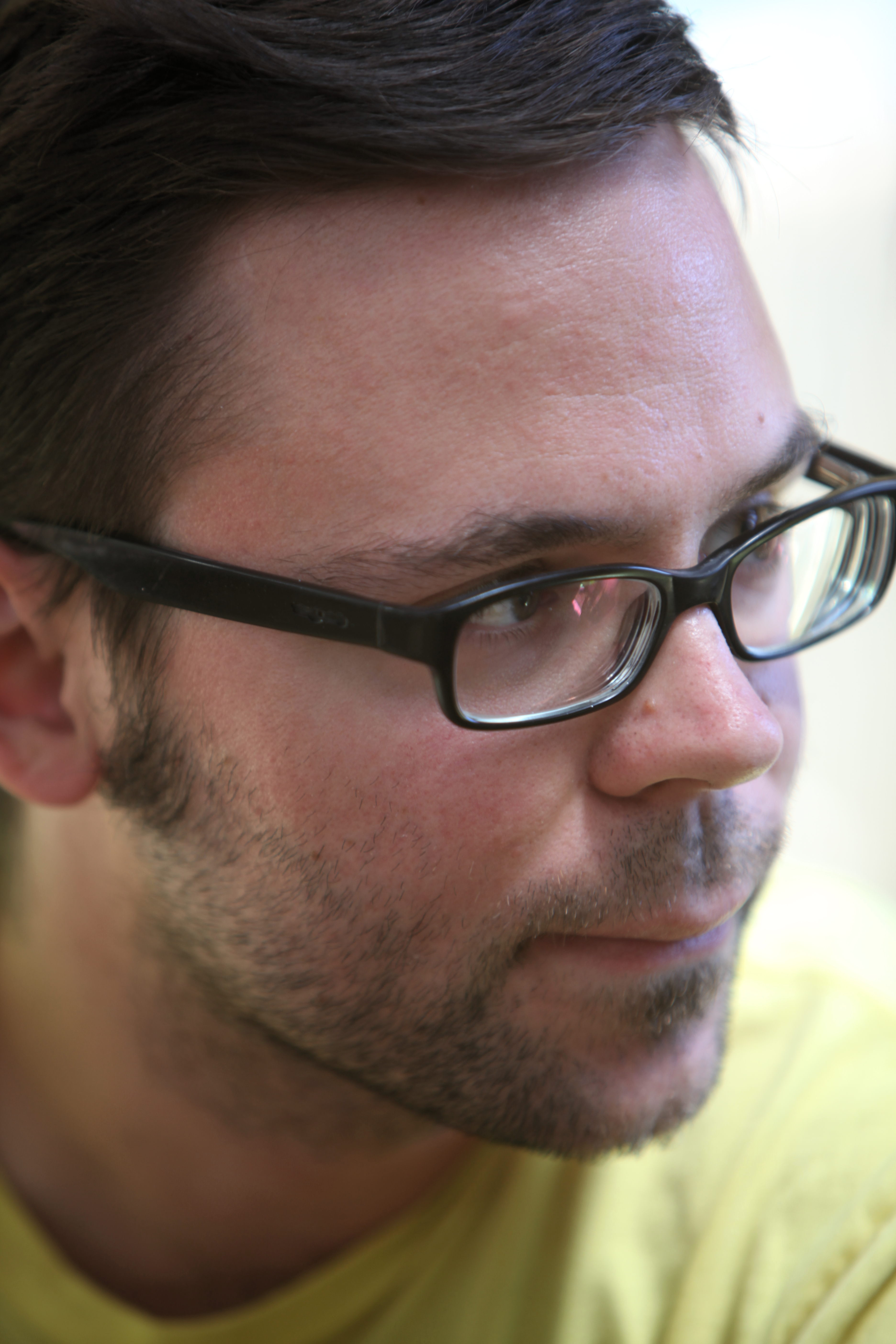
Stéphane Bergeron

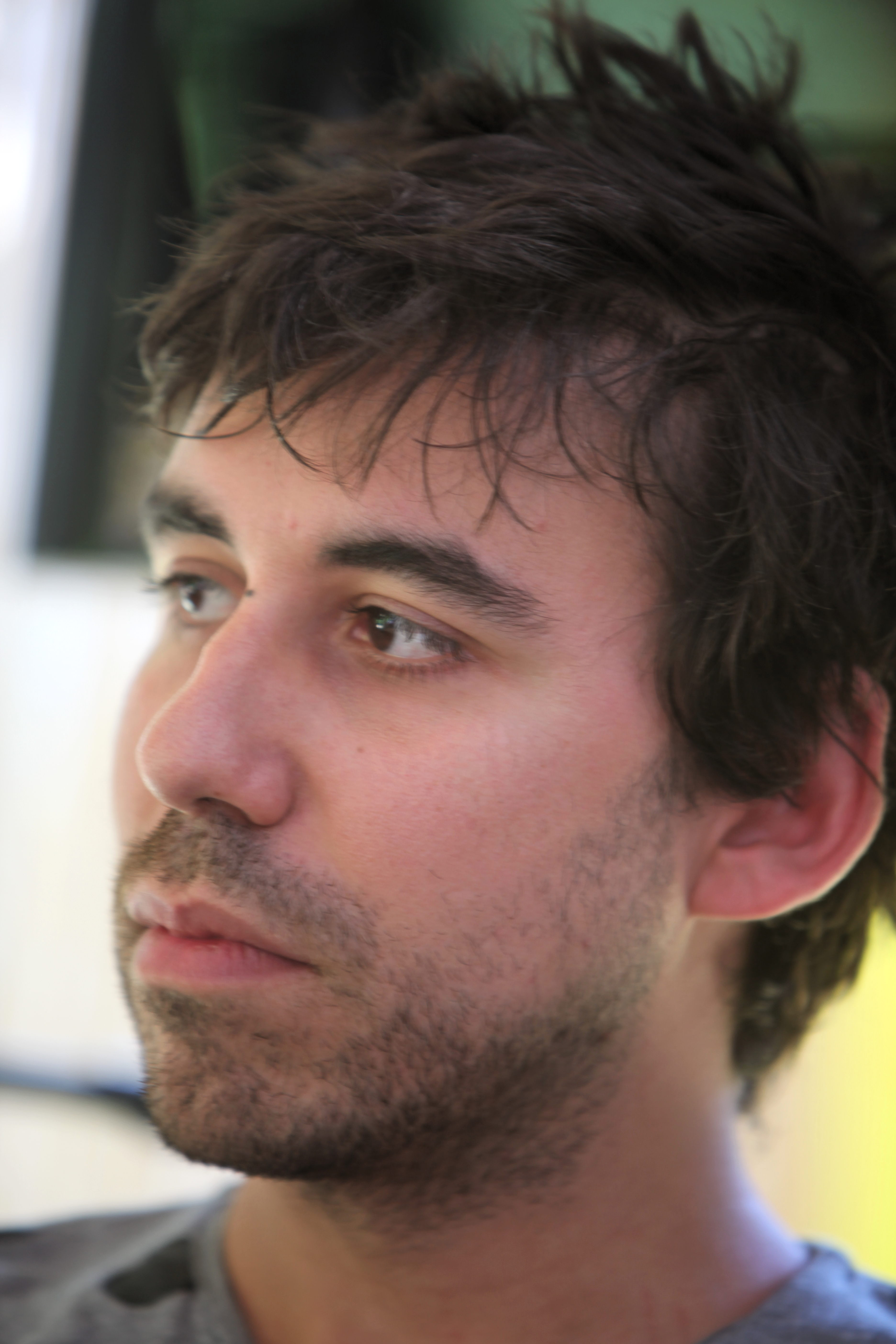
Julien Sagot

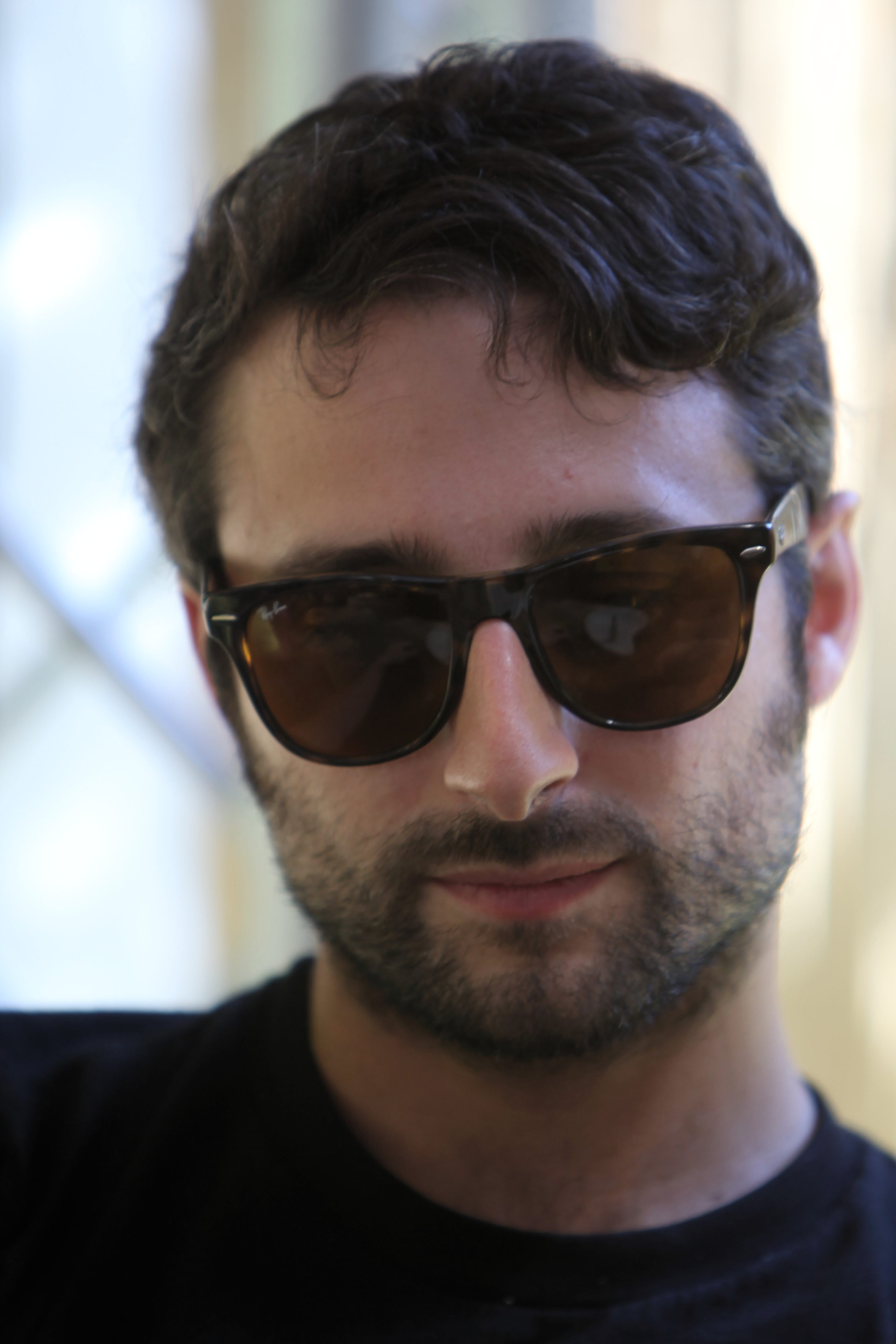
Louis-Jean Cormier

=== Past ===
- Michel Gagnon – guitars and vocals (1998–2001)
- Martin Pelletier – bass guitar (1998–2001)

== Discography ==
Le Pensionnat des établis

- Released: 14 October 2003
- Format: CD
- Label: C4 Productions
- Tracks: Eleven
- Singles: "Poisson Cru"

Les Tremblements s'immobilisent

- Released: 7 November 2005
- Format: CD
- Label: Audiogram
- Tracks: Twelve
- Singles: "La marche," "Coup d'état," "La fuite," "Vrai"

Le Volume du vent

- Released: 1 April 2008
- Format: CD
- Label: Audiogram
- Tracks: Thirteen
- Singles: "Échapper au sort," "Oublie pas," "La façade," "À la chaîne"

Les Chemins de verre

- Released: 30 March 2010
- Format: CD
- Label: Audiogram
- Tracks: Twelve
- Singles: "Les chemins de verre," "Marie tu pleures," "Le pyromane"

Dans la seconde

- Released: 8 September 2023
- Format: CD
- Label: Simone Records
- Singles: "Parfaite à l'écran"
