= (Last Night We Were) The Delicious Wolves =

Studio album by Hawksley Workman
- Released: 2001
- Genre: Indie rock
- Length: 39:46
- Label: Universal Music Canada
- Producer: Hawksley Workman

Hawksley Workman chronology
For Him and the Girls (1999)	(Last Night We Were) The Delicious Wolves (2001)	Almost a Full Moon (2002)

Professional ratings
Review scores
Source	Rating
Allmusic	3/5 stars
Pitchfork Media	6.7/10 link

(Last Night We Were) The Delicious Wolves is an album by Canadian artist Hawksley Workman, released in 2001 by Isadora Records/Universal Music and re-released for the UK by Ba Da Bing!. It was produced and recorded by Workman at his 'Hawksleytown' studio, with additional recording, mixing & mastering by Joao Carvalho at Umbrella Sound.

Features performances by Sarah Slean (background vocals on tracks 7 & 10) and Sarah McElcheran (trumpet).

== Track listing (original) ==
1. "Striptease"
2. "Jealous of Your Cigarette"
3. "You, Me and the Weather"
4. "Little Tragedies"
5. "What a Woman"
6. "Your Beauty Must Be Rubbing Off"
7. "Old Bloody Orange"
8. "Clever Not Beautiful"
9. "No Beginning No End"
10. "Dirty and True"
11. "Lethal and Young"

== Track listing (UK re-release) ==
1. "Striptease"
2. "Jealous of Your Cigarette"
3. "You, Me and the Weather"
4. "Little Tragedies"
5. "What a Woman"
6. "Your Beauty Must Be Rubbing Off"
7. "Old Bloody Orange"
8. "Clever Not Beautiful"
9. "No Beginning No End"
10. "Dirty and True"
11. "Lethal and Young"
12. "It Shall Be" (Bonus Track)
13. "Watching the Fires" (Bonus Track)
14. "Striptease" (Video)
15. "Jealous of Your Cigarette" (Video)
16. "No Beginning No End" (Video)
