= The Cash Brothers =

Canadian alternative country/folk rock duo

- Origin: Toronto, Ontario, Canada
- Genres: Alternative country, folk rock
- Years active: 1996–present
- Labels: Rounder, Zoë
- Members: Andrew Cash; Peter Cash

The Cash Brothers are a Canadian alternative country/folk rock duo, based in Toronto, Ontario, consisting of brothers Andrew and Peter Cash. Their alt-country/alt-folk music includes ballads which blend acoustic and electric guitar work with vocal harmonies.

== History ==
Prior to the creation of The Cash Brothers, Andrew and Peter Cash both had established careers as songwriters and musicians. Andrew was a member of the bands L'Étranger and Ursula, and a solo artist, and Peter was a member of Skydiggers. Although their careers were closely connected (Skydiggers, in fact, often played as Andrew's backing band at the Spadina Hotel), they had never written or performed as a duo.

In 1996, however, Peter left his band, and Ursula disbanded. The brothers started writing songs and performing as a duo. Their debut album as The Cash Brothers, Raceway, was recorded over time at Chemical Sound and released independently in 1999. With a few changes, it was re-released in the US and in Europe by Rounder Records in 2001 under the name How was Tomorrow. The pair toured with a backup band in the UK, Netherlands and the US in support of the album.

Their second album, Phonebooth Tornado, came out in 2000.

By the time their album A Brand New Night was released in 2003, the pair had toured extensively, and were developing a more electric and pop-oriented sound. They toured in support of the album in the US.

== Touring band ==
While on tour, the brothers travel with a backup band. Musicians who have toured with the Cash Brothers include Gord Tough, Randy Curnew, Paul Taylor and Todd Lumley.

== Discography ==
- Raceway (1999)
- Phonebooth Tornado (2000)
- How Was Tomorrow (2001) (re-release of Raceway)
- A Brand New Night (2003)
- Skydiggers/Cash Brothers (2006)
