= Hawksley Workman =

Canadian musician (born 1975)

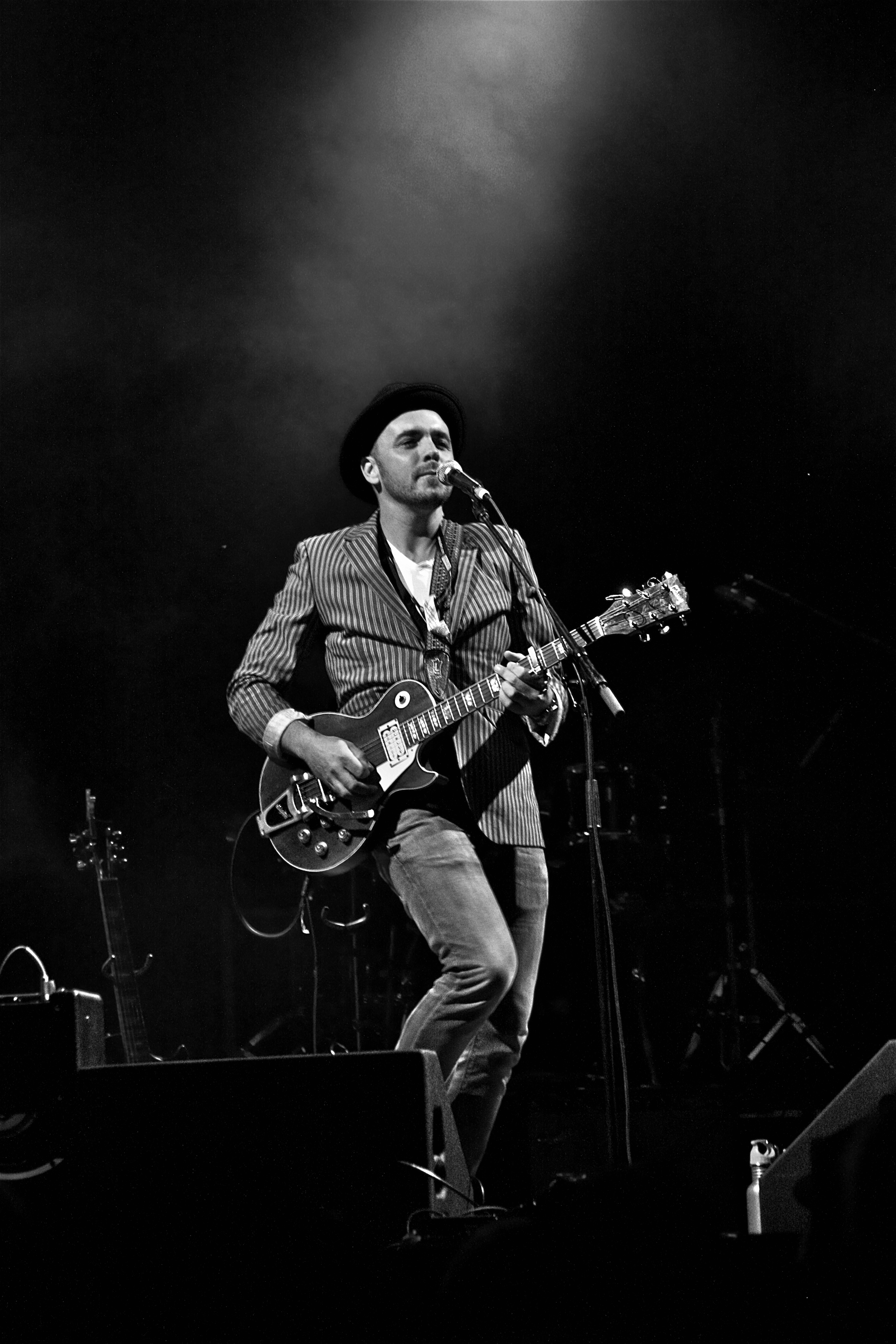
- Hawksley Workman, 2010

Background information
- Born: Ryan Corrigan; March 4, 1975 (age 51); Huntsville, Ontario
- Origin: Toronto, Ontario, Canada
- Genres: Cabaret; pop rock; glam rock
- Occupation: Musician
- Instruments: Vocals; guitar; bass; drums; keyboards
- Labels: Isadora; Ba Da Bing!; Universal; Six Shooter
- Website: hawksleyworkman.com

Hawksley Workman (born Ryan Corrigan, March 4, 1975) is a Canadian rock singer-songwriter whose music blends cabaret pop and glam rock. Workman has released more than a dozen albums. A multi-instrumentalist, he plays guitar, drums, bass, keyboards and sings on his recordings, often switching between instruments during live performances. Workman has produced and engineered many of his own recordings, as well as albums for other artists.

In 2013, Workman formed the band Mounties, with Ryan Dahle (Limblifter) and Steve Bays (Hot Hot Heat). Their debut album, Thrash Rock Legacy, was released on March 4, 2014, on Light Organ Records. His music has been featured on the television series Scrubs, Falcon Beach and Queer as Folk. Workman also appeared in Micheal McGowan's films Score: A Hockey Musical and Still Mine.

== Early life and education ==
Workman was born in Huntsville, in the Muskoka region of Ontario, and attended Huntsville High School. He later moved to Toronto to pursue his musical career and started using the stage name Hawksley Workman.

== Career ==
=== Early career (1998–2006) ===
In the late 1990s, Workman initially recorded in the front entrance of a friend's studio before moving to a basement studio on Hillsdale Avenue in Toronto. There, he recorded his early albums For Him and the Girls and (Last Night We Were) The Delicious Wolves, as well as material later released on Before We Were Security Guards and Puppy (A Boy's Truly Rough). Workman also engineered and produced albums for other Canadian artists, including Tegan and Sara and The Cash Brothers.

Workman released his debut album, For Him and the Girls, in 1999 on his own label, Isadora Records. It was released in the UK through Loose Music Records in October 2000. An AllMusic review compared elements of the album to the music of Tom Waits and Harry Nilsson. Around the release of his debut album, Workman published a number of letters to "Isadora", a fictional lover, in the classified section of Toronto's NOW magazine. The letters were collected in the book Hawksley Burns for Isadora, first published by Gutter Press in 2001, with an edition released by ECW Press in 2002.

In 2000, Workman collaborated with Jason Collett and Andrew Cash on Chrome Reflection, an album released under the name Bird. Workman's second album, (Last Night We Were) The Delicious Wolves, was released in March 2001 through Isadora Records, with distribution in Canada by Universal Music Canada. The album included the singles "Striptease" and "Jealous of Your Cigarette". At the end of 2001, Workman released the Christmas-themed EP Almost a Full Moon.

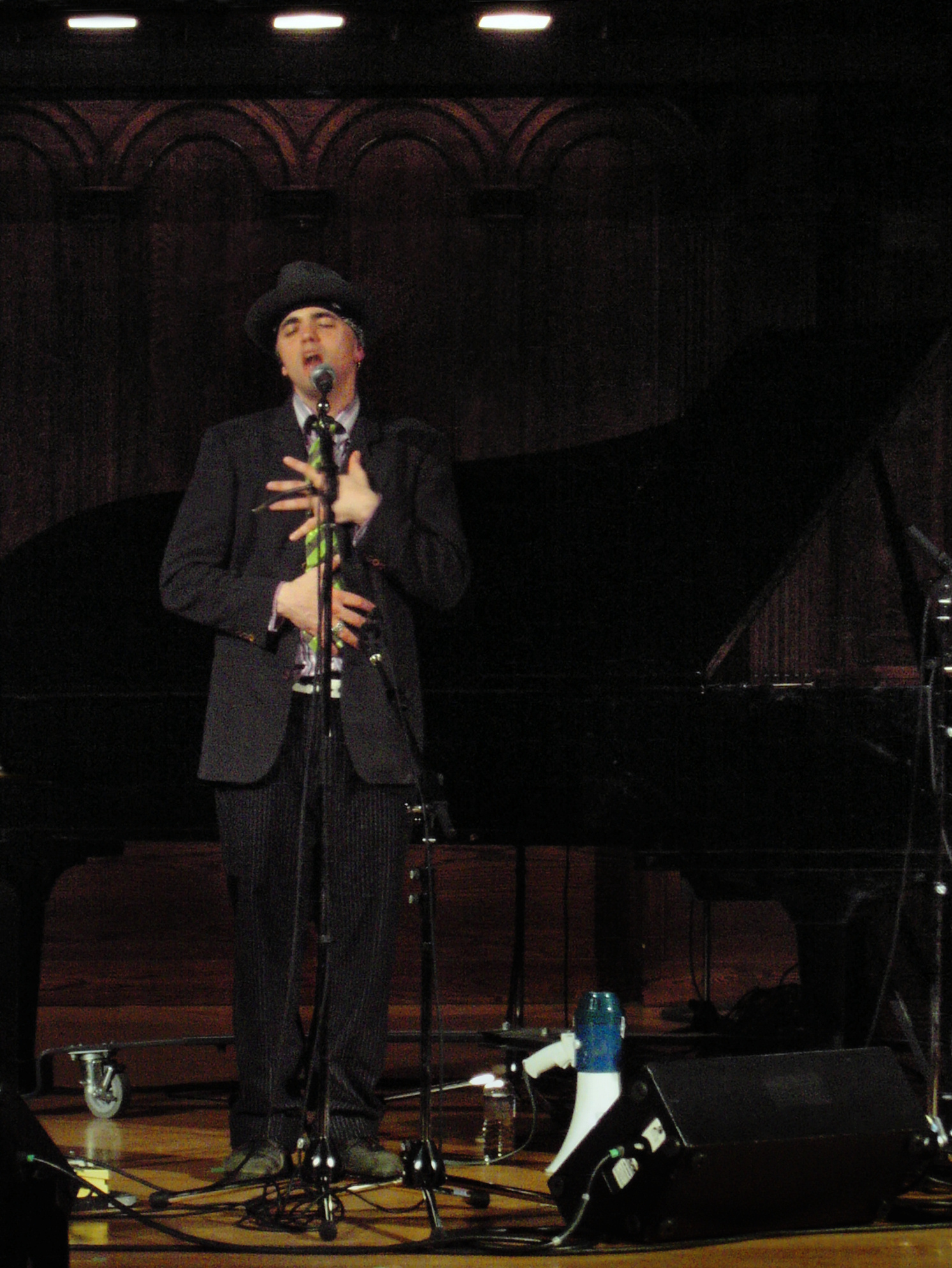
Hawksley Workman performing at the Victoria Conservatory of Music in 2006

Workman was awarded the Juno Award for Best New Solo Artist in 2002, while the music video for "Jealous of Your Cigarette", directed by Sean Michael Turrell, won Best Video. He also composed the music for "Chanter n'est pas jouer", a song on Johnny Hallyday's 2002 album À la vie, à la mort!. The album Lover/Fighter followed in 2003, which included the singles "Anger as Beauty" and "We Will Still Need a Song". The album was recorded at the Schoolhouse, a former one-room schoolhouse near Huntsville, Ontario, that Workman had purchased and converted into a recording studio.

Workman appeared alongside Jully Black and Sam Roberts in the 2004 MuchMusic social-issue documentary Inside Your Threads, about garment workers in Mexico and Bangladesh, directed by Liz Marshall and Tania Natscheff. The same year, he released Live in Lille, a concert DVD documenting a performance in Lille, France. He also released Before We Were Security Guards, an album of recordings from 1998 that was initially sold at concerts, and produced Serena Ryder's album Unlikely Emergency, released through his Isadora Records label in 2005.

In 2006, Workman released Treeful of Starling, a more stripped-down, acoustic album compared to the high energy of Lover/Fighter. He also released two tour albums, Puppy (A Boy's Truly Rough) and My Little Toothless Beauties. The song "It's a Long Life to Always Be Longing", from the album, was also included on the soundtrack album for the Canadian television series Whistler.

=== Later career (2007–2016) ===
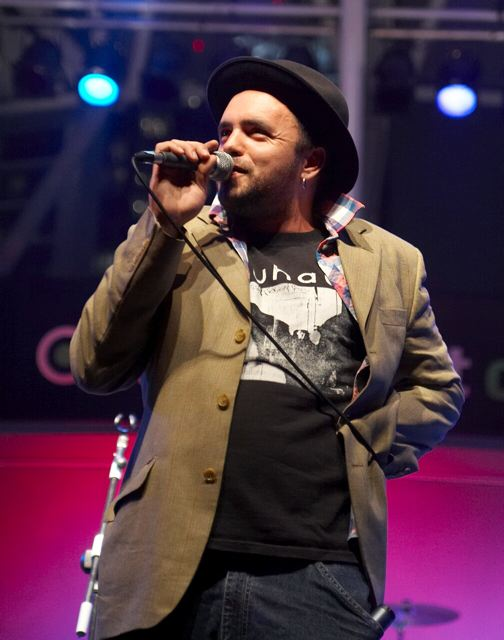
Hawksley Workman performing on stage in Toronto, Ontario, Canada in 2007

In November 2007, Workman released the single titled "Piano Blink", followed by his album Between the Beautifuls in January 2008. Later in 2008, he contributed the track "The Strong Ones" with Marion Cotillard for Cartier's LOVE campaign.

Workman also released Los Manlicious, with the album appearing exclusively in Europe in May before its Canadian release on August 26, 2008. Both albums were recorded during the same session, with Los Manlicious featuring Workman's return to more rock-oriented material. As well as Workman himself (credited as HW), several producers were credited for this album, including Martin "Doc" McKinney, Andre Wahl and Bob Ezrin. The album's lead single, "When You Gonna Flower?", was released to Canadian radio in 2008 and the track "Fatty Wants to Dance", has been remixed by The Paronomasiac. A series of videos were filmed during Workman's 2008 European tour in support of Los Manlicious.

Workman has performed live both as a duo with keyboardist Todd Lumley ("Mr. Lonely") and with larger backing bands. His late-2008 touring lineup for Between the Beautifuls included Lumley, bassist Derrick Brady, violinist and guitarist Jesse Zubot, and drummer Brad Kilpatrick. In March 2009, Workman hosted the Juno Songwriters' Circle in Vancouver. Later that year, his debut album, For Him and the Girls, was released in the US on November 17. In 2010, Workman released two albums: Meat on January 19, and Milk in Canada on August 10, following the earlier digital release of individual tracks from Milk.

Workman at Calgary International Film Festival in 2010

In November 2011, Workman released "Full Moon Eleven", a re-recording of his 2001 Christmas Album Almost a Full Moon, which had originally been recorded in Paris. In 2012, he presented an early version of his musical theatre production The God That Comes at the Uno Festival in Victoria, British Columbia. He also contributed songwriting and instrumental performances to Alan Doyle's debut solo album, Boy on Bridge. The following year, Workman released Songs from the god that comes, an album accompanying the stage production The God That Comes, which he co-created with Christian Barry of 2b Theatre Company.

In early 2014, Mounties released their debut album, Thrash Rock Legacy, featuring Workman on drums. The concert film Hawksley Workman: Live at the Ship was released in July 2014, documenting performances recorded at the Ship Inn in St. John's, Newfoundland, in 2012. In August 2014, Workman performed The God That Comes at the Edinburgh Festival Fringe. He was also part of the lineup for the inaugural Muskoka Sound Music Festival in Huntsville, Ontario, that September.

On June 2, 2015, Workman released Old Cheetah through Six Shooter Records. The album was recorded using a former CBC mixing console and vintage effects equipment, including a Roland RE-201 Space Echo. He published the children's picture book Almost a Full Moon in September 2016, based on his earlier Christmas song and illustrated by Jensine Eckwall. Later that year, he collaborated with Thomas D'Arcy as the duo Tommy Hawkins, releasing their debut EP, Amy, in November.

=== Present career (2017–present) ===
Workman performed Bruce Cockburn's song, "Silver Wheels" at the 2017 Canadian Songwriters Hall of Fame induction ceremony in Toronto, honoring Cockburn's induction. He also wrote songs for The Silver Arrow: The Untold Story of Robin Hood, a 2018 stage production by Mieko Ouchi at Edmonton's Citadel Theatre. That September, Workman played a series of shows in the UK, including a solo acoustic performance at King Tut's in Glasgow. In October 2018, he released "Battlefords", the lead single from Median Age Wasteland. Released in 2019 and produced by Murray Lightburn of The Dears, the album incorporated folk and country influences.

In February 2020, Workman and Sarah Slean released the five-track EP These Two. During the COVID-19 pandemic, he launched Hawksley Night in Canada, an online music and variety series, in May 2020. His next solo album, Less Rage More Tears, followed in October. The following year in 2021, Workman collaborated with guitarist Kevin Breit on the instrumental album Breit Workman, on which he played drums.

Workman collaborated with playwright Charlotte Corbeil-Coleman on Almost a Full Moon, a stage musical based on his Christmas album of the same name, which premiered at Edmonton's Citadel Theatre in November 2022. Workman produced Wind Up/Let Go, an album by Kingston band Oakridge Ave., released in September 2023. He also marked the 20th anniversary of Lover/Fighter with a deluxe reissue in October and a tour performing the album in full.

In 2024, Workman's podcast The Stumble Forward featured interviews with musicians including Sarah Harmer and Ron Sexsmith. His six-song EP Fly Like an Ego, produced by Steve Bays, followed in April 2025. A Canadian tour later that year extended into February 2026, with performances scheduled across British Columbia and Alberta.

== Discography ==
Year	Title	Format	Notes	Ref.
1999	For Him and the Girls	Studio album	UK release in 2000; US release in 2001 and reissue in 2009	
2001	(Last Night We Were) The Delicious Wolves	Studio album	Reissued in the UK in 2003 with two bonus tracks	
2001	Almost a Full Moon	EP	Christmas release; expanded edition reissued in 2002	
2003	"Anger As Beauty"	Single	Released separately from Lover/Fighter	
2003	"We Will Still Need a Song"	Single	Further European editions released in 2004	
2003	Lover/Fighter	Studio album	Released through Isadora Records/Universal Music	
2004	"No Reason to Cry Out Your Eyes (On the Highway Tonight)"	Single	Also included on Lover/Fighter	
2004	Before We Were Security Guards	Archival album	Earlier recordings, initially sold at concerts	
2004	Live in Lille	Concert DVD	Recorded in Lille, France	
2006	Treeful of Starling	Studio album	Released through Isadora Records/Universal Music	
2006	Puppy (a boy's truly rough)	Archival album	Earlier recordings; originally a limited tour release	
2006	My Little Toothless Beauties	Archival album	Originally a limited tour release	
2008	Between the Beautifuls	Studio album	Released through Universal Music	
2008	Between the B-Sides	EP	Limited release of B-sides	
2008	Los Manlicious	Studio album	Released in Europe in May and Canada in August	
2010	Meat	Studio album	Released in January	
2010	Milk	Studio album	Tracks released digitally before the Canadian album release in August	
2011	Full Moon Eleven	Re-recorded album	New recording of Almost a Full Moon	
2013	Songs from the God That Comes	Soundtrack album	Accompanies the stage production The God That Comes	
2015	Old Cheetah	Studio album	Released through Six Shooter Records	
2019	Median Age Wasteland	Studio album	Produced by Murray Lightburn	
2020	Less Rage More Tears	Studio album	Released in October	
2025	Fly Like an Ego	EP	Six tracks; produced by Steve Bays	

=== Collaborative releases and production work ===
Year	Title	Artist	Workman's role	Ref
1999	Sedona Arizona	John Southworth	Producer	
2000	Close and Play	Paul MacLeod	Producer, musician	
2000	This Business of Art	Tegan and Sara	Producer, multi-instrumentalist	
2000	Chrome Reflection	Bird	Collaborator, musician	
2001	How Was Tomorrow?	The Cash Brothers	Additional production, instrumentation	
2002	Night Bugs	Sarah Slean	Co-producer	
2003	Bittersweet Harmony	Skydiggers	Co-producer, musician	
2005	Unlikely Emergency	Serena Ryder	Producer, musician	
2007	Goodbye Blue Monday	Jeremy Fisher	Producer, musician	
2008	Fortune's Favour	Great Big Sea	Producer	
2008	Into Your Lungs	Hey Rosetta!	Producer	
2010	The Early Widows	Justin Rutledge	Producer	
2010	Flood	Jeremy Fisher	Producer	
2011	Modern Romantics	Adaline	Producer (most tracks)	
2011	Carleton Stone	Carleton Stone	Producer	
2012	Boy on Bridge	Alan Doyle	Songwriting, instrumentation	
2014	Thrash Rock Legacy	Mounties	Band member, drummer	
2016	Amy	Tommy Hawkins	Duo member with Thomas D'Arcy	
2020	These Two	Sarah Slean	Collaborative EP	
2021	Breit Workman	Kevin Breit	Collaborative album, drums	
2023	Wind Up/Let Go	Oakridge Ave.	Producer	
