= John Southworth (musician) =

Canadian singer-songwriter

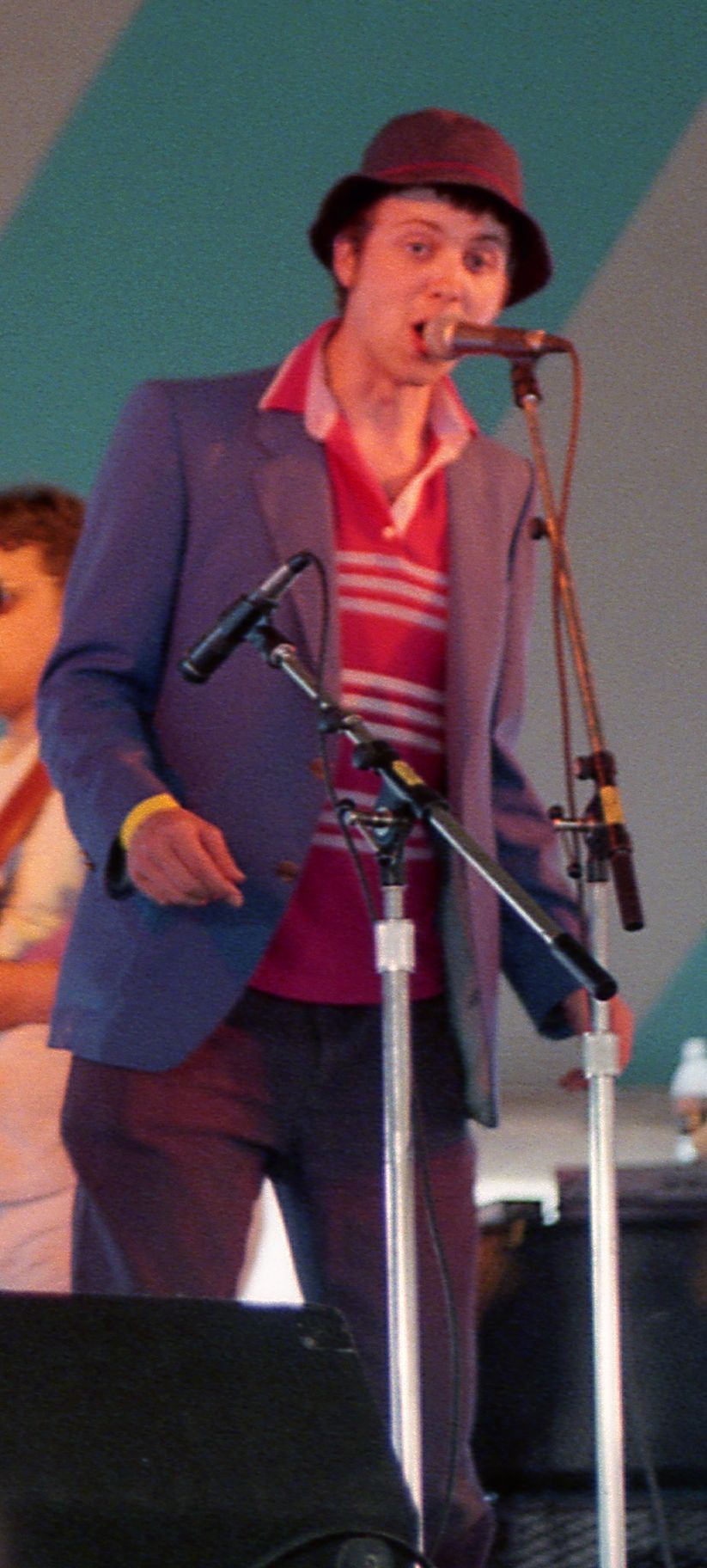
- Southworth at the Hillside Festival in 1998

Background information
- Born: 22 April 1972 (age 54); Cuckfield, West Sussex, England
- Occupation: Singer-songwriter
- Years active: 1996–present

John Southworth (born 22 April 1972) is a British-Canadian singer-songwriter, performer, author and videomaker. He performs a diverse range of popular and peculiar song genres, from AM oldies-radio to traditional folk balladry, 1980s pop to art song and cabaret.

== History ==
He was born in Cuckfield, West Sussex, England. He emigrated to Vancouver, Canada with his family when he was eight.

Southworth's orchestral debut record Mars Pennsylvania was released on Bar None Records in 1998.

He has since released a number of cross-genre albums on small labels, each stylistically varied from the other, including Sedona Arizona (1999), Banff Springs Transylvania (2000 featuring Mary Margaret O'Hara), Yosemite (2005), The Pillowmaker (2007) (performed with his longtime band The South Seas, featuring members from Toronto's avant-jazz-improv community) and Mama Tevatron (2009). The South Seas also backed Southworth on the elegiac Human Cry (2010) reissued on UK label Tin Angel Records in August 2018.

In 2011 Southworth released Spiritual War Cassette Tape, recorded in part on a Sony Cassette Corder Model TCM-939. The following year he debuted the surreal cabaret song cycle Easterween featuring arrangements by Toronto arranger Andrew Downing at the Lower Ossington Theatre in Toronto. A collection of actual rejected jingles appeared later in the same year on Failed Jingles for Bank of America & other U.S. Corporations (2012).

In July 2014 it was announced that Southworth would be releasing a double record on Tin Angel Records called Niagara, featuring nine songs on the Canadian side and eleven on the American side. Co-produced by Jean Martin (a drummer and percussionist known for his work with Tanya Tagaq) and again featuring The South Seas, Niagara was named Album of the Year 2014 by Rolling Stone Germany and Canada's National Post. On September 2, 2016, Small Town Water Tower LP was announced, set for an October release. The LP Miracle in the Night was released May 3, 2019.

On October 1, 2021, the album to the multiplatform Rialto (album, podcast, book, show-film) was released on Tin Angel Records. The album features singers The Weather Station, Martin Tielli, Daniel Knox, Felicity Williams, Robin Dann, Thom Gill and Ryan Driver with arrangements for string quartet by Andrew Downing performed by Venuti String Quartet. An eight-episode podcast featuring chapters of the novella began on July 19, 2021, and features the speaking voices of the singers as well as 20 other artists including U.S. Girls, Claudia Dey and Veda Hille among others. AllMusic's four-star review of the album said, "Southworth delivers some of the most serpentine and complex melodies of his career... one of his most fully realized and imaginative works". A show featuring an art film directed by Southworth with accompanying live performance premiered in Toronto in March 2022 at the Paradise Theater.

On May 12, 2023, Southworth released When You're This, This in Love on Tin Angel.

Southworth's songs have been covered by or written for such artists as The Weather Station, Basia Bulat, Kevin Johansen, Sarah Slean, Luke Temple, Buck 65, Hawksley Workman, Jully Black, Martin Tielli and Veda Hille. The Weather Station covered "Loving You" (from Niagara) on their 2022 album How Is It That I Should Look at the Stars.

Daydreams For Night, an alternative children's book featuring illustrations by David Ouimet, was published by Azuka in Japan and Simply Read in 2015.

A former film student, he directs his own videos.

He is the son of Peter Shelley, the British 1970s pop singer-songwriter, later a producer and record executive.

== Discography ==
- Mars Pennsylvania (1997)
- Sedona Arizona (1999)
- Banff Springs Transylvania (2000)
- Rose Milk Appalachia (EP 2001)
- Yosemite (2005)
- The Pillowmaker (2006)
- Mama Tevatron (2009)
- Human Cry (2010)
- Spiritual War Cassette Tape (2011)
- Easterween (with Andrew Downing 2012)
- West Coast Persona (EP 1998 & 2012)
- Failed Jingles for Bank of America & other U.S Corporations (2012)
- Niagara (2014)
- Small Town Water Tower (2016)
- Miracle In The Night (2019)
- Rialto (2021)
- When You're This, This in Love (2023)
- The Red Castle (2025)
- Rain from the East (2026)
