= For Him and the Girls =

Studio album by Hawksley Workman
- Released: 1999
- Recorded: Basement of 59 Hillsdale Ave E., Toronto, Ontario, Canada
- Genre: Indie rock
- Length: 57:12
- Label: Universal Music Canada, Ba Da Bing!
- Producer: Hawksley Workman

Hawksley Workman chronology
For Him and the Girls (1999)	(Last Night We Were) The Delicious Wolves (2001)

For Him and the Girls is an album by Canadian artist Hawksley Workman, released in 1999. Written and produced by Hawksley Workman with arrangement collaboration by John Southworth. Recorded and mixed in the basement of 59 Hillsdale Ave E., Toronto, Ontario, Canada. Mastered by Joao Carvalho at Umbrella Sound, in Toronto, ON. CD Jacket design by Wade Gilpin.

The record was recorded on a Tascam 1/2" 8-track analog reel to reel tape recorder. All instruments except those listed below were played by Hawksley Workman. Hawksley began each song by recording the drums as single performances, which gives the listener an insight into his extraordinary ability to visualize a complete song. He subsequently added each instrument to build the tracks.

A Yamaha DX-100 keyboard was used for sine wave bass notes on the record.

Several of the final mixes on DAT format were almost lost when the tape was mangled badly. That tape was successfully repaired allowing recovery of the mixes for this record.

Additional artists: Lenni Jabour (back vox), John Southworth (back vox), Doug Tielli (trombone), Sarah McElcheran (trumpet), Karl Mohr (clarinet, earthmen).

Professional ratings
Review scores
Source	Rating
Allmusic	link

== Track listing ==
1. "Maniacs"
2. "No Sissies"
3. "Sad House Daddy"
4. "Tarantulove"
5. "Sweet Hallelujah"
6. "Bullets"
7. "Don't Be Crushed"
8. "Stop Joking Around"
9. "All of Us Kids"
10. "Safe and Sound"
11. "Paper Shoes"
12. "Baby This Night"
13. "No More Named Johnny"
14. "Beautiful and Natural"
