= Les Chemins de verre =

Studio album by Karkwa
- Released: March 30, 2010
- Genre: Indie rock
- Length: 46:41
- Label: Audiogram

Karkwa chronology
Le Volume du vent (2008)	Les Chemins de verre (2010)	Karkwa Live (2012)

Singles from Les chemins de verre
- 1. "Les chemins de verre" Released: March 16, 2010

Professional ratings
Review scores
Source	Rating
Bande à part	(9.4/10)

Les Chemins de verre is the fourth studio album by Québec indie rock group Karkwa. The album's title literally translates as "The Glass Pathways" or "The Glass Roads", although it is also a pun on the French language phrase chemins de fer, or "railroads".

The entire album was written and recorded over the span of 21 days.

The album won the 2010 Polaris Music Prize, making Karkwa the first francophone band to win the award. The album subsequently also won the Juno Award for Francophone Album of the Year at the 2011 Juno Awards.

The album has received a gold certification by Music Canada, selling 40,000 copies as of December 8, 2011.

== Track listing ==
No.	Title	Length
1.	"Le Pyromane"	4:09
2.	"L'acouphène"	3:39
3.	"Moi-Léger"	3:09
4.	"Marie tu pleures"	3:30
5.	"Le bon sens"	3:30
6.	"Les Chemins de verre"	3:20
7.	"Dors dans mon sang"	4:45
8.	"La piqûre"	5:02
9.	"Les enfants de Beyrouth"	3:48
10.	"Au-dessus de la tête de Lilijune"	1:34
11.	"28 jours"	4:53
12.	"Le vrai bonheur"	5:27
