= Jason Collett =

Canadian musician

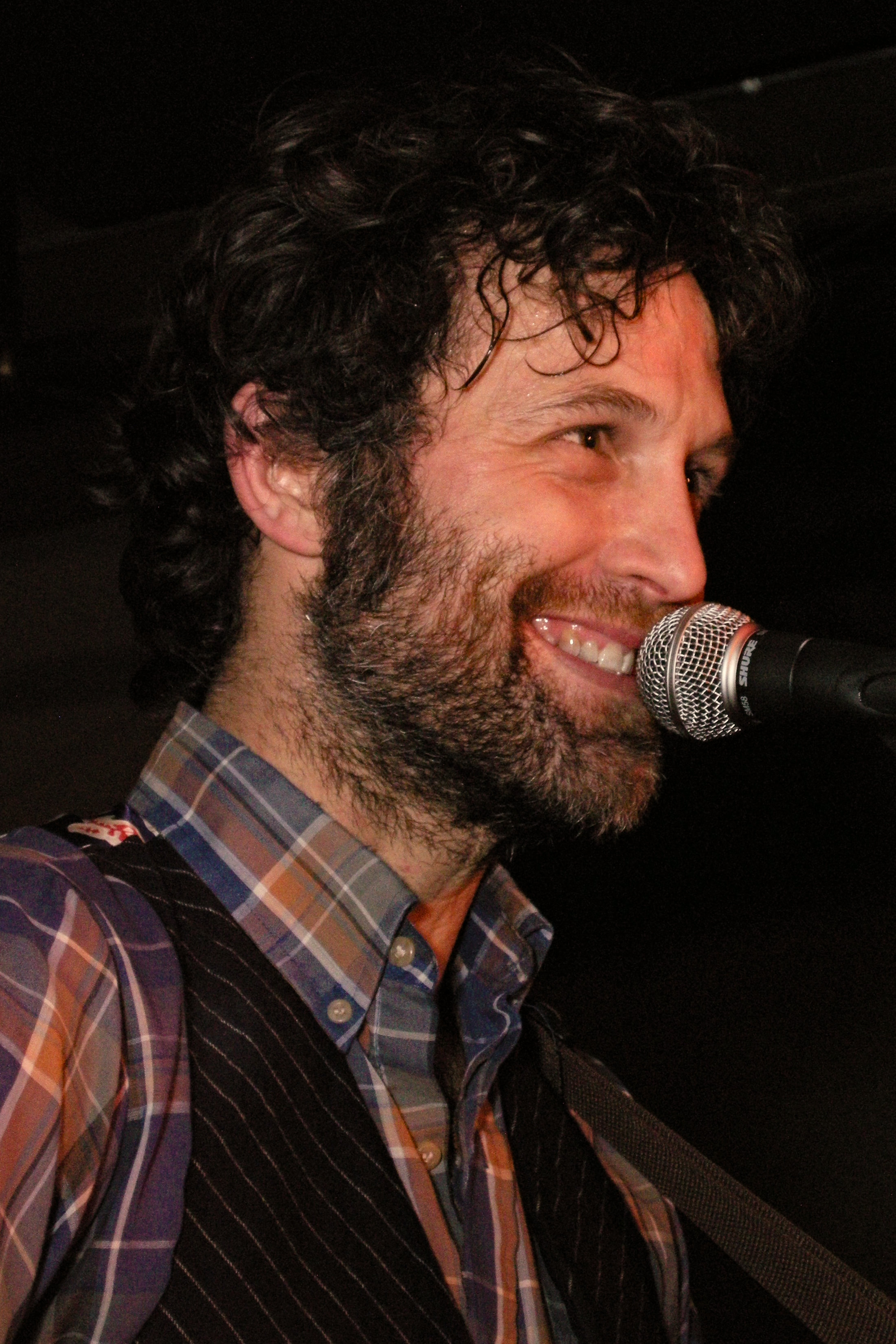
- Jason Collett performing in Guelph, Ontario (January 17, 2008).

Background information
- Born: Jason Robert Collett; Bramalea, Ontario
- Origin: Toronto, Ontario, Canada
- Genres: Alt-country, indie rock
- Years active: 1999–present
- Label: Arts & Crafts
- Formerly of: Bird, Broken Social Scene

Jason Robert Collett is a Canadian singer-songwriter from Toronto, Ontario. He has released six solo studio albums, and is a former member of Broken Social Scene.

== Early life ==
Collett was born in Bramalea, a Greater Toronto Area suburb. He began writing songs at a young age to escape the boredom of his suburban life, and cites Bob Dylan, Kris Kristofferson, and Nick Lowe as influences. Eventually, Collett moved to downtown Toronto where he worked as a woodworker and carpenter, doing renovations and custom home building, while he pursued his music.

In the late 1980s, Collett co-founded the band Lazy Grace with Kathryn Rose and Kersti McLeod, performing every Monday at Toronto's Spadina Hotel at the popular indie music gathering, Radio Mondays, alongside The Weakerthans and artists on the record label Arts & Crafts, who would perform and write songs together. Collett has mentioned how Radio Mondays were great community-building events, with five or six artists on stage at a time.

Around 2000, he was a part of the short-lived alternative country group Bird, of which Andrew Cash and Hawksley Workman were also members. Bird released one album, 2000's Chrome Reflection.

== Broken Social Scene ==
It was his work with Broken Social Scene that allowed Collett to give up woodworking and become a full-time musician. Collett became a member of Broken Social Scene, serving as one of their guitarists, after the band's album You Forgot It In People. Collett was eventually convinced by Kevin Drew to join the band once they moved from a strictly instrumental band into one that wrote their own songs.

Though Collett took a break from touring with Broken Social Scene in the fall of 2005 to pursue his solo career and spend time with his family, Collett has made many musical connections through the band. His 2005 album, Idols of Exile, produced by Howie Beck, featured many prominent Canadian artists. Broken Social Scene's Kevin Drew, Leslie Feist and Brendan Canning all contributed, as did members of bands Stars and Metric.

== Solo work ==
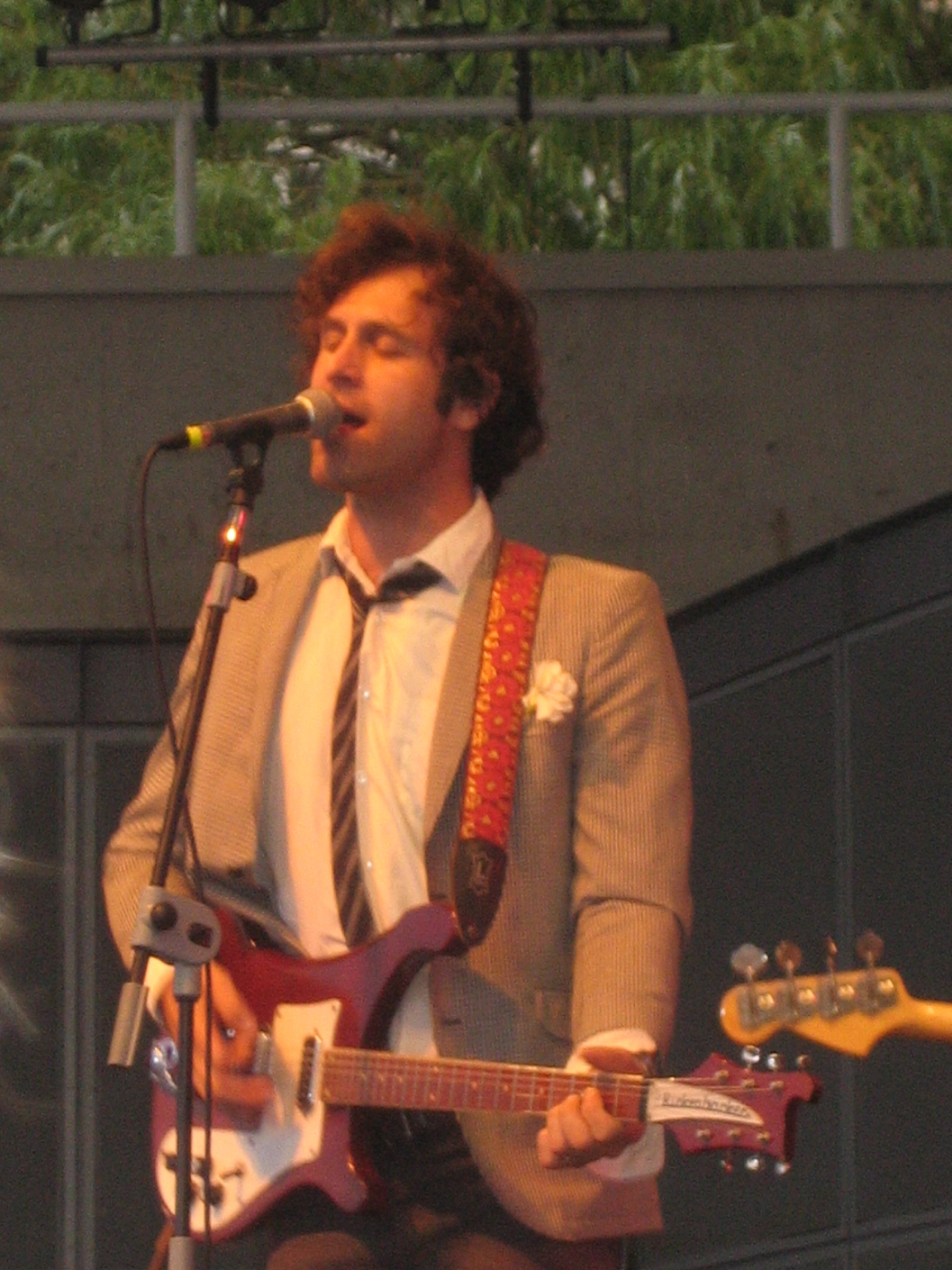
Jason Collett performing a free Canada Day 2006 concert at the Harbourfront Centre in Toronto, Canada.

In 2001 he released his debut solo album Bitter Beauty. AllMusic gave it a 3 out of 5 rating, and Canadian Musician gave a positive review. In 2002 he followed up with Motor Motel Love Songs.

In 2005, he released Idols of Exile, his first for Arts & Crafts. Here's to Being Here was released in February 2008.

In 2007, Collett and poet Damian Rogers began coordinating The Basement Revue, a recurring concert series at Toronto's Dakota Tavern which saw writers and musicians collaborating on performances, with lineups not announced in advance of the show. The event later graduated to larger venues, most notably the annual Luminato Festival.

Formerly touring with backing band Paso Mino, made up of members Robbie Drake, Afie Jurvanen, Mike O'Brien, and Michael P. Clive, in 2008 he debuted a new band consisting of Robbie Drake, Mike O'Brien, Carlin Nicholson, and Neil Quin, who also released music separately as the band Zeus.

In 2009, Collett took part in an interactive documentary series called City Sonic. The series, which featured 20 Toronto artists, had him reflecting on his longtime relationship with Kensington Market.

Collett's fifth solo studio album, Rat a Tat Tat, produced by O'Brien and Nicholson, was released in March 2010. He followed up later the same year with Pony Tricks, an album which featured re-recorded alternate versions of songs from his prior albums.

His seventh solo studio album, Reckon was released in September 2012.

In 2013, he had an acting role in a stage production of Sam Shepard's play Cowboy Mouth, staged at Toronto's Cameron House.

He released his eighth album, Song and Dance Man on February 5, 2016. The following year he coordinated New Constellations, a collaborative concert tour which paired established Canadian pop and rock artists with emerging Indigenous Canadian artists.

In 2018, he contributed the song "Sensitive Man" to the compilation album The Al Purdy Songbook.

His ninth album, Head Full of Wonder, was released in 2022.

== Discography ==
- 2000: Chrome Reflection [Bird]
- 2001: Bitter Beauty
- 2002: Motor Motel Love Songs
- 2005: Idols of Exile
- 2008: Here's to Being Here
- 2010: Rat a Tat Tat
- 2010: Pony Tricks
- 2012: Reckon/Essential Cuts
- 2016: Song and Dance Man
- 2022: Head Full of Wonder

== See also ==
- List of Canadian musicians
