= Isadora Records =

Independent record label

Isadora Records is an independent record label started and operated by Hawksley Workman. The first album released was Workman's own debut, For Him and the Girls, in 1999. The label has been releasing albums online since 2004. Isadora's earlier releases were manufactured and distributed by Universal Music, but more recently they have been distributed by Warner Music in Canada, Sheer Music in the US, and Alternative Distribution Alliance in other markets.

The company's logo, a nude silhouette, was designed by Workman's mother, artist Beverly Hawksley. The name Isadora originated with a publicity campaign in which Workman published love letters, and classified ads in Now magazine, to the fictitious Isadora, an idealized lover. The letters eventually formed the book Hawksley Burns for Isadora, from Gutter Press in Toronto.

Isadora's recording artists have included Hawksley Workman and Serena Ryder.

== See also ==
- List of record labels
