= Juno Award for Adult Alternative Album of the Year =

Music award category

The Juno Award for Adult Alternative Album of the Year, administered by Canadian Academy of Recording Arts and Sciences (CARAS), has been awarded since 2005 to recognize the best album in the adult alternative genre by a Canadian artist.

== Winners and nominees ==
Year	Winner(s)	Album	Nominees	Ref.
2005	Sarah Harmer	All of Our Names	Sarah Slean, Day One; Matt Mays, Matt Mays; Ron Sexsmith, Retriever; Rufus Wainwright, Want Two	
2006	Neil Young	Prairie Wind	Blue Rodeo, Are You Ready; Luke Doucet, Broken (and other rogue states); Kathleen Edwards, Back to Me; Low Millions, Ex-Girlfriends	
2007	Jim Cuddy	The Light That Guides You Home	Sarah Harmer, I'm a Mountain; Matt Mays, When the Angels Make Contact; Ron Sexsmith, Time Being; Neil Young, Living with War	
2008	Blue Rodeo	Small Miracles	Tom Cochrane, No Stranger; Jeremy Fisher, Goodbye Blue Monday; Rufus Wainwright, Release the Stars; Neil Young, Chrome Dreams II	
2009	Serena Ryder	Is It O.K.	Kathleen Edwards, Asking for Flowers; Ron Sexsmith, Exit Strategy of the Soul; Sarah Slean, The Baroness; Hawksley Workman, Between the Beautifuls	
2010	Joel Plaskett	Three	Howie Beck, How to Fall Down in Public; Cuff the Duke, Way Down Here; Amy Millan, Masters of the Burial; 1977, Nineteen Seventy-Seven	
2011	Neil Young	Le Noise	Black Dub, Black Dub; Luke Doucet and the White Falcon, Steel City Trawler; Sarah Harmer, Oh Little Fire; Justin Nozuka, You I Wind Land and Sea	
2012	Feist	Metals	Jim Cuddy, Skyscraper Soul; Cuff the Duke, Morning Comes; Jenn Grant, Honeymoon Punch; Ron Sexsmith, Long Player Late Bloomer	
2013	Serena Ryder	Harmony	Bahamas, Barchords; The Barr Brothers, The Barr Brothers; Kathleen Edwards, Voyageur; Royal Wood, We Were Born to Glory	
2014	Ron Sexsmith	Forever Endeavour	A. C. Newman, Shut Down the Streets; Basia Bulat, Tall Tall Shadow; Hayden, Us Alone; The Sadies, Internal Sounds	
2015	Bahamas	Bahamas Is Afie	The Barr Brothers, Sleeping Operator; Leonard Cohen, Popular Problems; Jeremy Fisher, The Lemon Squeeze; Jenn Grant, Compostela	
2016	Whitehorse	Leave No Bridge Unburned	Tobias Jesso Jr., Goon; Mo Kenney, In My Dreams; Joel Plaskett, The Park Avenue Sobriety Test; Daniel Romano, If I've Only One Time Askin'	
2017	Gord Downie	Secret Path	Basia Bulat, Good Advice; Wintersleep, The Great Detachment; Leonard Cohen, You Want It Darker; Andy Shauf, The Party	
2018	Gord Downie	Introduce Yerself	Leif Vollebekk, Twin Solitude; Terra Lightfoot, New Mistakes; Timber Timbre, Sincerely, Future Pollution; Whitehorse, Panther in the Dollhouse	
2019	Bahamas	Earthtones	The Barr Brothers, Queens of the Breakers; Dan Mangan, More or Less; Rhye, Blood; Gabrielle Shonk, Gabrielle Shonk	
2020	Half Moon Run	A Blemish in the Great Light	City and Colour, A Pill for Loneliness; Leonard Cohen, Thanks for the Dance; iskwē, acākosīk; Patrick Watson, Wave	
2021	Bahamas	Sad Hunk	Begonia, Fear; Basia Bulat, Are You in Love?; Sarah Harmer, Are You Gone; Rufus Wainwright, Unfollow the Rules	
2022	Half Moon Run	Inwards & Onwards	Bahamas, Live to Tape, Vol. 1; Hannah Georgas, All That Emotion; Andy Shauf, Wilds; The Weather Station, Ignorance	
2023	The Sadies	Colder Streams	Altameda, Born Losers; Basia Bulat, The Garden; Dan Mangan, Being Somewhere; The Weather Station, How Is It That I Should Look at the Stars	
2024	Feist	Multitudes	Begonia, Powder Blue; Jeremy Dutcher, Motewolonuwok; Hayden, Are We Good; Shawnee Kish, Revolution	
2025	Elisapie	Inuktitut	Terra Lightfoot, Healing Power; The Secret Beach, We Were Born Here, What's Your Excuse?; Leif Vollebekk, Revelation; Wild Rivers, Never Better	
2026	Bahamas	My Second Last Album	The Barr Brothers, Let It Hiss; Patrick Watson, Uh Oh; The Weather Station, Humanhood	
2026	Begonia	Fantasy Life	The Barr Brothers, Let It Hiss; Patrick Watson, Uh Oh; The Weather Station, Humanhood	
