= The Tribes of Palos Verdes =

2017 American film directed by Emmett and Brendan Malloy

- Theatrical release poster
- Directed by: Emmett Malloy; Brendan Malloy
- Screenplay by: Karen Croner
- Based on: The Tribes of Palos Verdes by Joy Nicholson
- Produced by: Robbie Brenner; Karen Croner
- Starring: Jennifer Garner; Maika Monroe; Cody Fern; Justin Kirk; Alicia Silverstone
- Cinematography: Giles Dunning
- Edited by: Tracy Adams; Luis Carballar
- Music by: Gustavo Santaolalla
- Production companies: The Firm; The Mark Gordon Company; Revek Entertainment; Truth Entertainment
- Distributed by: IFC Films
- Release dates: October 6, 2017 (Hamptons International); December 1, 2017
- Running time: 104 minutes
- Country: United States
- Language: English
- Box office: $11,603

The Tribes of Palos Verdes is a 2017 American coming-of-age drama film directed by Emmett Malloy and Brendan Malloy, from a screenplay by Karen Croner. It is based on the novel of the same name by Joy Nicholson. It stars Jennifer Garner, Maika Monroe, Cody Fern, Justin Kirk, Elisabeth Röhm, Goran Višnjić, Joely Fisher and Alicia Silverstone. The film centers around the lives of a family who move to Palos Verdes, an affluent, coastal suburb of Los Angeles. It was released on December 1, 2017, by IFC Films.

== Plot ==
Phil (Justin Kirk) and Sandy Mason (Jennifer Garner) have moved to Palos Verdes, with their teenage twins, Medina (Maika Monroe) and Jim (Cody Fern). Phil and Sandy seem to think only about themselves. Sandy seems very different from Phil, who enjoys going out to parties and traveling, where Sandy likes to stay inside wrapped in a pink bath robe.

Sandy's mood swings and inability to adjust to her new surroundings make her paranoid and difficult to handle. She suspects Phil of having an affair, due to him lying about working late and the smell of Chanel perfume in his car. A short while later Phil tells Medina while running on the beach that he wishes to move away because he has found love with Ava (Alicia Silverstone), the real estate agent he bought their home from.

He asks Medina to back him when he tells Sandy about it, but Medina says nothing and runs back home. Sandy fights with Phil when he tells her he plans to leave, and says she will be moving out and Jim agrees to go with her. When confronted by Phil, Jim voices his disgust about his father's behavior. In the heat of the moment, Phil slaps Jim who in turn punches his father.

Phil moves out to live with Ava, while Sandy uses Phil's money to buy lavish furniture for the house, and purposely runs up the electric bill for fun. Medina finds some solace in surfing, which she has come to love. Jim, however, does not handle the separation well, and feeling alienated and hated by his father, turns to drugs and drinking. Medina goes to dinner with her father and Ava, meeting Ava's son Adrian (Noah Silver), who is soon leaving for college.

Jim decides to stay home with Sandy instead of going with Medina to the dinner. Jim progressively seems more attached to drugs throughout and lands himself in the hospital. Phil comes to see him and Jim is happy, asking to go on the trip to Paris his father was planning to take. Phil says it's more of a work trip and Ava's first time going, but next time for sure, seeing as how it might make their mother upset.

Jim is visibly put off by Phil's rejection of him. Medina spends time with Adrian and they spend the night together. When Adrian drives her home in the morning, Jim comes out and starts beating on his car. Medina sends Adrian away and Jim cries to her that he thought she had run away for good, and begs her not to leave him all alone. Medina, worried, calls her father in Paris and is caught by Sandy. Sandy is convinced that Jim is perfectly fine and that she is taking care of him, to which Medina disagrees.

She points out that her mother treats Jim more like a husband than a son. Medina decides that she and Jim need to run away together. Adrian gives her the money her father keeps hidden, and she goes home to pick up Jim, who is once again under the influence of drugs. Before they can leave, Jim says that Sandy is right, and he should burn the house down.

He lights a flare and throws it into a bush in the front yard. Medina runs inside for her mother, as Jim lights another flare and runs down the road. Jim is found by the police and taken to the hospital, where it is revealed he may have suffered a psychotic break, due to the stresses at home and a combination of drugs. Medina says that she and Jim will still go away together when he gets out.

Medina's intro from the movie plays over again, and she tells of the machines that clean the sand. She says that one found Jim passed out on the beach, and that his heart just stopped beating, because of a combination of prescription drugs he had stolen. His body is cremated, and the family gathers at the beach as a unit. Sandy runs into the water and dumps his ashes in, crying out. She hugs Medina and tells her she's sorry over and over. Medina says in a voiceover that her father would like her to come and live with him, and that her mother is getting help and would also like her to come. She says she will do neither, and she will travel without a plan, to surf and see the world, like she and Jim had said they would do.

== Cast ==
- Jennifer Garner as Sandy Mason, Phil's wife and Medina and Jim's mother
- Maika Monroe as Medina Mason, Phil and Sandy's daughter and Jim's twin sister
- Cody Fern as Jim Mason, Medina's twin brother and Phil and Sandy's son
- Justin Kirk as Phil Mason, Sandy's husband and Medina and Jim's father
- Goran Višnjić as Joe
- Elisabeth Röhm as Kristen
- Joely Fisher as Janet
- Stevie Lynn Jones as Heather
- Alicia Silverstone as Ava
- Noah Silver as Adrian
- Thomas Cocquerel as Mildew
- Milo Gibson as Chad
- Alex Neustaedter as Alex
- Alex Knost as Famous Surfer

== Production ==
In October 2015, it was announced that Jennifer Garner and Maika Monroe had been cast in the film, with Emmett Malloy and Brendan Malloy directing, based on the novel of the same name by Joy Nicholson, from a screenplay by Karen Croner. Firm Films would produce the film. In January 2016, Stephen Moyer, Elisabeth Röhm, Goran Višnjić, Milo Gibson, Noah Silver, Joely Fisher and Stevie Lynn Jones joined the cast. In February 2016, Justin Kirk, Alicia Silverstone and Tom Cocrel joined the cast, with Kirk replacing Moyer. Production began in March 2016.

== Soundtrack ==
The Tribes of Palos Verdes

Soundtrack album by various artists
- Released: December 8, 2017
- Genres: Soundtrack; film score
- Length: 30:32
- Label: Brushfire Records

Singles from The Tribes of Palos Verdes
- 1. "My Love" Released: November 5, 2017; 2. "Only the Ocean" Released: December 13, 2017

Jack Johnson chronology
All the Light Above It Too (2017)	The Tribes of Palos Verdes (2017)	Jack Johnson: The Essentials (2018)

Bahamas chronology
Bahamas Is Afie (2017)	The Tribes of Palos Verdes (2017)	Earthtones (2018)

The Tribes of Palos Verdes is the soundtrack album for the film and was released on December 8, 2017 and features 10 songs by artists such as Jack Johnson, and Bahamas. The soundtrack also includes an original score by 2x Academy Award winning composer Gustavo Santaolalla.

Track listing

1. "Tribes of Palos Verdes Theme" - Gustavo Santaolalla
2. "My Love" - Bahamas
3. "Teenage Girl" - Cherry Glazerr
4. "Rumination" - Branden Miller
5. "Easy Easy" - King Krule
6. "Glued To You" - Tomorrows Tulips
7. "Jim's Theme" - Gustavo Santaolalla
8. "Baby" - Ariel Pink's Haunted Graffiti (featuring Dâm-Funk)
9. "Facedown" - Gustavo Santaolalla
10. "Only the Ocean" - Jack Johnson

=== Singles ===
The lead single of the album was "My Love" by Bahamas, which was released on November 5, 2017. A music video for the song was released on December 11. The second single, "Only the Ocean" by Jack Johnson, was released on December 13, 2017, along with a music video. The music video for "Only the Ocean" has received over 1.5 million views on Vevo.

== Release ==
In May 2017, IFC Films acquired U.S. distribution rights to the film. It was released on December 1, 2017.

== Reception ==
On the review aggregator website Rotten Tomatoes, the film holds an approval rating of 69% based on reviews from 29 critics, with an average rating of 5.5/10. The website's critics consensus reads, "The Tribes of Palos Verdes serves up a minor – albeit alluringly atmospheric – variation on the coming-of-age story, led by a strong performance from Maika Monroe." Metacritic, which uses a weighted average, assigned the film a score of 49 out of 100, based on reviews from 10 critics, indicating "mixed or average reviews".
