= How Is It That I Should Look at the Stars =

Studio album by the Weather Station
- Released: March 4, 2022
- Recorded: March 10–12, 2020
- Studio: Canterbury Music Studios, Toronto
- Genre: Folk, folk jazz
- Length: 32:16
- Label: Fat Possum
- Producer: Tamara Lindeman, Jean Martin

The Weather Station chronology
| Ignorance (2021) | How Is It That I Should Look at the Stars (2022) | Humanhood (2025) |

Singles from How Is It That I Should Look at the Stars
- 1. "Endless Time" Released: January 25, 2022; 2. "To Talk About" Released: March 2, 2022

How Is It That I Should Look at the Stars is the sixth studio album by the Canadian folk band the Weather Station, released March 4, 2022, by Fat Possum Records. The album was recorded over three days in March 2020 in Toronto, with frontwoman Tamara Lindeman singing, producing, playing piano, and leading a lineup consisting of guitarist Christine Bougie, saxophonist and clarinetist Karen Ng, upright bassist Ben Whiteley, pianist and flautist Ryan Driver, and keyboardist Tania Gill.

The folk and folk jazz album was preceded by two singles, "Endless Time" and "To Talk About", both with music videos directed by Lindeman. It has received mostly positive reviews from critics who also frequently compared the album to the band's previous release Ignorance, mainly noting the stark differences between the two despite the songs from both all coming from the same writing sessions in 2018. The album was nominated for Adult Alternative Album of the Year at the Juno Awards of 2023.

== Writing and recording ==
How Is It That I Should Look at the Stars is made up of ten songs which were written for the band's previous album Ignorance but deemed to not suit that album's expansive mood. Thinking the songs were still too good to waste, frontwoman Tamara Lindeman convened a party of musicians – Christine Bougie, Karen Ng, Ben Whiteley, Ryan Driver, and Tania Gill – in Canterbury Music Studios near Lindeman's home in Toronto's West End to record over three days, March 10–12, 2020. Lindeman intentionally didn't tell anyone that she was making the record, and wasn't even sure if it'd ever get released. She described the album as "the moon to Ignorance's sun: hushed and nocturnal relative to its predecessor's agile rhythms and broad pop canvas", but said that both albums came from the same period of post-tour burnout and climate grief-driven depression in the autumn of 2018.

The sessions took place five days before Ontario Premier Doug Ford declared a state of emergency over the onset of the COVID-19 pandemic, though Lindeman says the virus wasn't on her mind because she expected it to be a "blip" like Toronto's 2003 SARS outbreak. She described the sessions as her and the other musicians being "in our own little dream-world", though the news did affect her while recording "Endless Time", giving her a "weird feeling in my stomach". She said the declaration was "really heavy" but that it put a "beautiful colour" on the record as the sessions felt like "the last moment of being together."

== Release ==
Two singles were released prior to the album: "Endless Time" on January 25, and "To Talk About" on March 2. Both came with music videos directed by Lindeman: "Endless Time" features the singer wandering around a city, singing and occasionally seeking a comforting hug from kind strangers, while "To Talk About" sees her on a beach and among an expanse of green plants. On the latter, Lindeman said she "wanted the video to capture the feeling to surrender the song has; a feeling to surrendering to emotion at the expense of everything else, within a world that is not necessarily conducive to that softness", turning to "stereotypical signifiers" such as sunsets and the color red to bring forth "a sort of operatic performance of emotion."

== Style and reception ==
How Is It That I Should Look at the Stars ratings
Aggregate scores
| Source | Rating |
|---|---|
| AnyDecentMusic? | 7.5/10 |
| Metacritic | 84/100 |
Review scores
| Source | Rating |
| AllMusic | 4/5 stars |
| American Songwriter | 3/5 stars |
| The A.V. Club | B+ |
| Beats Per Minute | 80% |
| Exclaim! | 8/10 |
| The Guardian | 3/5 stars |
| The Line of Best Fit | 7/10 |
| NME | 4/5 stars |
| Pitchfork | 8/10 |
| PopMatters | 8/10 |

According to the review aggregator Metacritic, How Is It That I Should Look at the Stars received "universal acclaim" based on a weighted average score of 84 out of 100 from 15 critic scores. AnyDecentMusic? gives an average score of 7.5/10 from 16 ratings.

The album has been described as folk and folk jazz. AllMusic's Heather Phares compares the album to the Weather Station's previous album Ignorance, calling this one "strikingly different from its predecessor but very much its equal" and noting that "instead of continuing the intricate studiocraft" of Ignorance, How Is It "opts for intimacy and spontaneity". The album "brings listeners so close to Lindeman that they can hear her feet on the piano pedals as a small crew of improvisers from Toronto's jazz scene provide intuitive extensions of her emotions and melodies." American Songwriter's Hal Horowitz compares the album to Laura Nyro's New York Tendaberry and Joni Mitchell's Blue with its "ten contemplative, almost wincingly personal slow songs". The A.V. Club and the Guardian both make comparisons to Mitchell as well, with the former calling said comparison "perhaps too easy". Multiple critics emphasise the album's complete lack of drums or percussion and the absence of synthesizers which were prominent on Ignorance.

NME's Will Richards says the album "manages to stand on its own two feet and avoids the fate of being cornered as Ignorance B-sides." While the two albums "inevitably intertwine and interact with each other", How Is It "has plenty to say on its own" and is "far from just leftovers". Uncut's Laura Barton calls it a "record that makes you hold your breath" which "you want to draw close", and one that "is quite simply stunning." Writing for Beats Per Minute, John Amen noted, "There's courage here. And humility. How Is It That I Should Look at the Stars occurs as a timely reach for compassion and transcendent love – love for the wounded self and others, for the endangered world, for life in its myriad forms."

=== Accolades ===
The album received a Juno Award nomination for Adult Alternative Album of the Year at the Juno Awards of 2023.

How Is It That I Should Look at the Stars on year-end lists
| Publication | # | Ref. |
|---|---|---|
| The Guardian | 39 | |
| Uncut | 12 | |
| WXPN | 18 | |

== Track listing ==
All tracks are written by Tamara Lindeman except "Loving You" which was written by John Southworth.

How Is It That I Should Look at the Stars track listing
| No. | Title | Length |
|---|---|---|
| 1. | "Marsh" | 4:31 |
| 2. | "Endless Time" | 4:20 |
| 3. | "Taught" | 2:51 |
| 4. | "Ignorance" | 2:30 |
| 5. | "To Talk About" | 3:47 |
| 6. | "Stars" | 3:33 |
| 7. | "Song" | 2:05 |
| 8. | "Sway" | 2:46 |
| 9. | "Sleight of Hand" | 3:02 |
| 10. | "Loving You" | 2:51 |
| Total length: | | 32:16 |

== Personnel ==
=== Musicians ===
- Tamara Lindeman – vocals, piano
- Christine Bougie – guitar, lap steel guitar
- Karen Ng – saxophone, clarinet
- Ben Whiteley – upright bass
- Ryan Driver – piano, flute, vocals on "To Talk About"
- Tania Gill – Wurlitzer electronic piano, Rhodes piano, Hohner Pianet

=== Technical ===
- Tamara Lindeman – producer, additional piano recording, arrangement (4)
- Jean Martin – producer, mixing, additional vocal recording
- Jeremy Darby and Julian Decorte – engineering
- Joao Carvalho – mastering engineer
- Tania Gill – musical notation (4)
- Jeff Bierk – cover photo
- Hugo Bernier – layout
