= Tamara Hope =

Canadian actress and musician

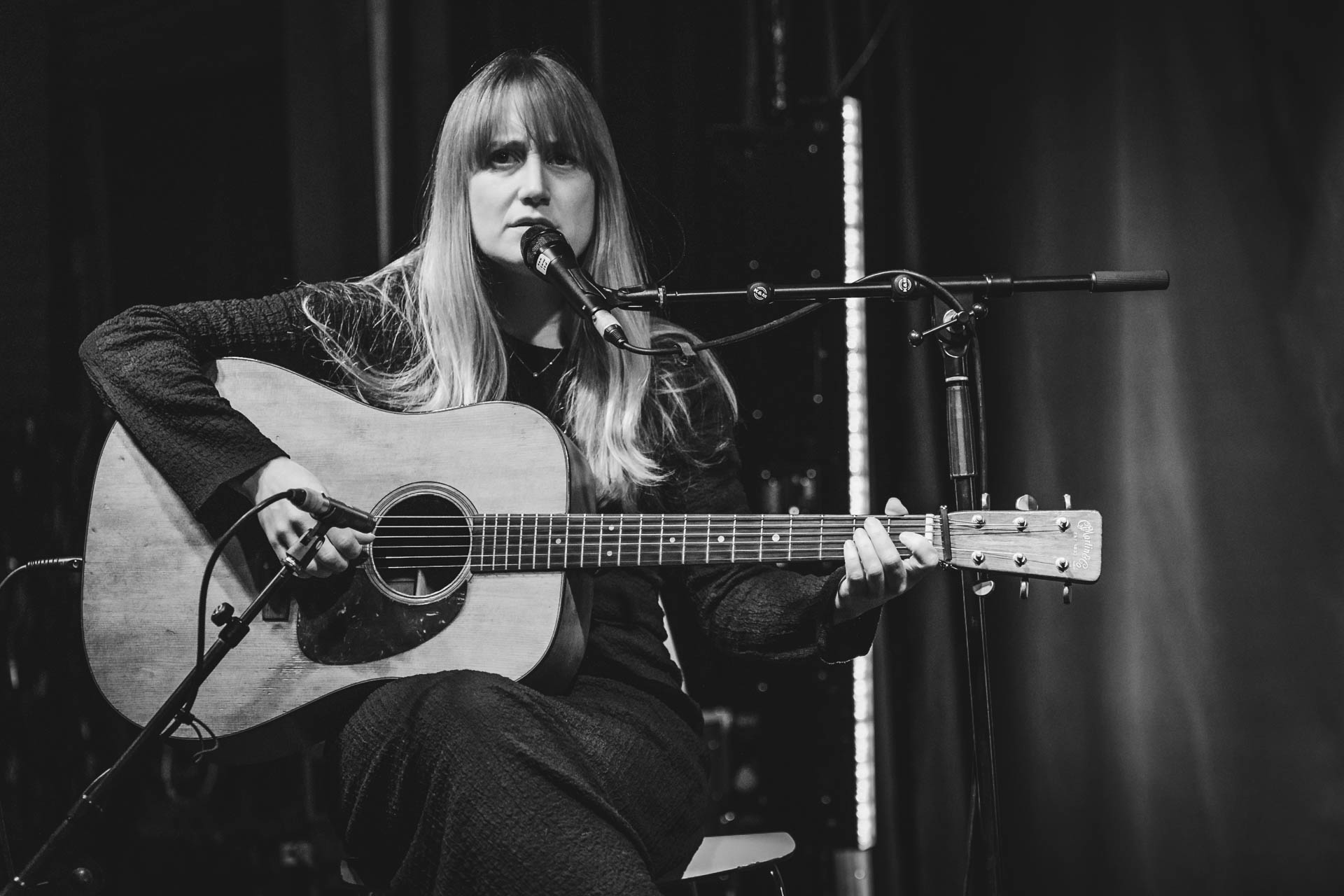
- Tamara Lindeman
- Born: Tamara Lindeman; November 2, 1984 (age 41); Toronto, Ontario, Canada
- Occupations: Actress, musician
- Years active: 1999–present

Tamara Lindeman (born November 2, 1984), also known by the name Tamara Hope, is a Canadian actress and musician. Her starring roles include Guinevere Jones and The Nickel Children, as well as a recurring role on CTV's Whistler as Leah McLure. In her music career, in which she is credited as Tamara Lindeman, she has worked with the band Bruce Peninsula and has her own music project, The Weather Station.

== Early life ==
Hope grew up in Ontario, Canada, in a family that has no other actors. Many of her relatives, including her father, are pilots. She lived in Dufferin County, and she sang in the Orangeville Choir from age 11. At age 12, she was part of the children's choir in the Donny Osmond–led production of Joseph and the Amazing Technicolor Dreamcoat at Toronto's Elgin Theatre. She acted in the play Spring Planting at Theatre Orangeville at age 16.

She enjoyed snowboarding, and as a teenager was a licensed snowboarding teacher. She moved to Toronto in 2002.

== Acting career ==
Her professional acting began in 1999 with a role in The Audrey Hepburn Story, a made-for-television movie starring Jennifer Love Hewitt which was filmed in Montreal. For her work in The Sandy Bottom Orchestra (2000), she won a Young Artist Award for Best Performance in a TV Movie (Drama) in the category Supporting Young Actress. She had a lead role in the Disney Channel Original Movie Stepsister from Planet Weird. She then played Tilda Swinton's character's daughter in the film The Deep End.

She portrayed Elizabeth I in the HBO production The Royal Diaries: Elizabeth I. In an episode of Twice in a Lifetime in 2000, she played the younger version of Cloris Leachman's character. She had the title role in the Canadian-Australian co-production of Guinevere Jones. In the 2003 TV movie The Piano Man's Daughter, she portrayed a younger version of Stockard Channing's character. For her work in The Nickel Children, a film about teenage prostitution, she was awarded the Breakout Performance Award at the 2005 Method Fest Independent Film Festival. She was a regular cast member of Whistler in 2007, playing snowboarding champion Leah McLure (although she was not permitted to do her own stunts).

In 2009, Hope was featured in the Modernista! ad campaign promoting the Palm Pre phone.

== Music career ==
In addition to her acting career, Lindeman is active in the Toronto music scene, performing in Bruce Peninsula and leading her own band, The Weather Station. She was a nominee for the 2013 SOCAN Songwriting Prize for "Mule in the Flowers", a song she cowrote with Steve Lambke.

She recorded Loyalty, her third full-length album as The Weather Station, at La Frette studios in Paris, France with Afie Jurvanen of Bahamas and Robbie Lackritz, who has worked on albums with Bahamas, Feist, Zeus and Jason Collett. Loyalty was released on May 5, 2015, on Paradise of Bachelors (worldwide) and Outside Music (Canada).

The Weather Station album Ignorance was released on February 5, 2021. It was described as "a beguiling jazz-folk opus with indie-rock inclinations"

The Weather Station album Ignorance was #7 in the Pitchfork's listing of the best albums of 2021.

== Filmography ==
=== Film ===
Year	Title	Role	Notes
2001	The Deep End	Paige Hall	
2003	The Republic of Love	Sophie	
2004	A Different Loyalty	Lucy Cauffield	
2004	Saint Ralph	Claire Collins	
2004	Shall We Dance	Jenna Clark	
2005	The Nickel Children	Cat	
2007	September Dawn	Emily Hudson	
2008	Shoot First and Pray You Live	Irene Melody	
2009	Manson	Linda Kasabian	
2012	Foxfire: Confessions of a Girl Gang	Marianne Kellogg	
2015	Crimson Peak	Society Girl #2	

=== Television ===
Year	Title	Role	Notes
1999	Winslow Homer: An American Original	Fee	TV film
2000	The Audrey Hepburn Story	Clara	TV film
2000	Stepsister from Planet Weird	Ariel Cola	TV film
2000	The Sandy Bottom Orchestra	Carol Wyman	TV film
2000	The Royal Diaries: Elizabeth I	Princess Elizabeth Tudor	TV film
2000	Twice in a Lifetime	Young Ruth Harper	"Grandma's Shoes"
2000-2002	Soul Food	Callie	Recurring role
2001	What Girls Learn	Elizabeth	TV film
2002	Guinevere Jones	Gwen Jones/Queen Guinevere	Lead role
2002	Tracker	Tina	"Children of the Night"
2003	The Piano Man's Daughter	Lilly Kilworth (12–14 years)	TV film
2003	Shattered City: The Halifax Explosion	Beatrix Collins	TV film
2004	Prom Queen: The Marc Hall Story	Carly	TV film
2004	Kevin Hill	Laura Walker	"Homework"
2005	Selling Innocence	Chelsea Burns	TV film
2005	Mayday	Linda Farley	TV film
2006	Augusta, Gone	Rain	TV film
2006	10.5: Apocalypse	Amy Hollister	TV miniseries
2007	Lies and Crimes	Kirsten	TV film
2007	ReGenesis	Julie Henshaw	"A Spontaneous Moment", "Dust in the Wind"
2007	Whistler	Leah Hutton	Recurring role
2008	Murdoch Mysteries	Edna Garrison	"Power"
2009	Sand Serpents	Jan Henle	TV film
2009	Manson	Linda Kasabian	TV film
2011	Covert Affairs	Emerson	"Bang and Blame"
2011	Three Inches	Cate	TV film
2012	Good God	Becky	Recurring role
2012	Beauty and the Beast	Emily	"Pilot"
2014	Transporter: The Series	Alice	"Sixteen Hands"
2014-2015	Murdoch Mysteries	Edna Brooks	Recurring role

== Discography ==
=== Albums with Bruce Peninsula ===
- Debut 7" EP (2008)
- A Mountain Is a Mouth (2009)
- Open Flames (2011)

=== Albums with The Weather Station ===
- East EP (2008)
- The Line (2009)
- All of It Was Mine (2011)
- Duets #1-3 (2013)
- What Am I Going to Do with Everything I Know EP (2014)
- Loyalty (2015)
- The Weather Station (2017)
- Ignorance (2021)
- How Is It That I Should Look at the Stars (2022)
- Humanhood (2025)

== Accolades ==
Year	Association	Category	Work	Result
2001	Young Artist Award	Best Performance in a TV movie (Drama) - Supporting Young Actress	The Sandy Bottom Orchestra	Won
2002	Young Artist Award	Best Performance in a TV movie or Special - Supporting Young Actress	What Girls Learn	Nominated
2005	Method Fest	Breakout Acting Award	The Nickel Children	Won
2007	Prism Awards	Performance in a TV movie	Augusta, Gone	Nominated
