= A Way with Words (disambiguation) =

A Way with Words is a public radio show and podcast, originally produced by KPBS.

A Way with Words may also refer to:

- A Way with Words, album by Kenny Werner (Cowbell) 2009
- "A Way with Words", song by An Angle from We Can Breathe under Alcohol 2005
- "A Way with Words", song by Moraz and Bruford from Flags (Moraz and Bruford album)
- "A Way with Words", song by Robert Plant Carry Fire 2017
- "Way with Words" (Bahamas song), 2017 sing by Canadian musician Bahamas
- "Way with Words", 2020 single album by South Korean group Kard
- "Way with Words", a song by the Vels from House of Miracles

== See also ==
- Away with Words, 1999 film
