= Humanhood =

Studio album by the Weather Station
- Released: January 17, 2025
- Recorded: 2023
- Studio: Canterbury Music
- Length: 44:25
- Label: Fat Possum
- Producer: Tamara Lindeman; Marcus Paquin

The Weather Station chronology
How Is It That I Should Look at the Stars (2022)	Humanhood (2025)

Singles from Humanhood
- 1. "Neon Signs" Released: October 2, 2024; 2. "Window" Released: November 20, 2024; 3. "Body Moves" Released: December 16, 2024

Humanhood is the seventh studio album by Canadian folk band the Weather Station. It was released on January 17, 2025, via Fat Possum, featuring the singles "Neon Signs", "Windows" and "Body Moves".

== Background ==
The album's lead single, "Neon Signs" was released on October 2, 2024, with a music video directed by Jared Raab, and the band's lead singer, Tamara Lindeman, who also co-produced the album with Marcus Paquin. Two additional singles, "Window" and "Body Moves", were released on November 20, 2024, and December 16, 2024. It was recorded by the band in 2023 at the Canterbury Music, a studio in Toronto.

The album consists of a mixture of pop, folk, indie rock, jazz, and ambient music, and centers on the theme of Lindeman's self-discovery and dissociation.

== Critical reception ==
Professional ratings
Aggregate scores
Source	Rating
AnyDecentMusic?	7.8/10
Metacritic	84/100
Review scores
Source	Rating
Rolling Stone	4/5 stars
AllMusic	4/5 stars
PopMatters	7/10 stars
Clash	9/10 stars
Paste Magazine	8.3/10 stars
Slant Magazine	3.5/5 stars
Sputnikmusic	3.6/5 stars
Mojo Magazine	4/5 stars
The Line of Best Fit	7/10 stars

At Metacritic, which assigns a normalized rating out of 100, Humanhood has an average score of 84 based on 16 reviews, indicating "universal acclaim".

Jon Dolan of Rolling Stone referred to it as "an album that takes on deep personal crises with engrossing poetic resolve. On Humanhood, every epiphany feels uniquely earned," while Exclaim! described Humanhood as "Lindeman's most fluid and confronting music yet, sparkling jazz-inflected art-rock painted with deep shadows and sudden spirals of light."

AllMusic's Heather Phares wrote in her review that Humanhood centers on "Lindeman in the middle of the mysterious, sacred process of returning to herself, and while the album may not offer many answers, its rare honesty, eloquence, and compassion make it another triumph for the Weather Station," PopMatters highlighted that "Humanhood finds the Weather Station going deep to find whatever heaven may exist on the surface above. The implied answer is that everything we need is already inside of us," rating the album seven stars, and Our Culture reviewed individual songs from the album and remarked "Lindeman and her remarkable band trace the process of dissociation, laying out the broken pieces and the possibility of reintegrating them, the shakiness of truth and all the purpose it provides. Humanhood keeps moving like that, imperfect but enlightened."

British newspaper Financial Times rated the album three stars, calling it better than its predecessor, How Is It That I Should Look at the Stars, but it "struggles to move on. It's about the stages of a personal breakdown," while The Wall Street Journal stated that Humanhood "returns to the fleshed-out sound of her breakthrough, and finds her turning her focus inward, with frequently stunning results," and CBC remarked "Humanhood, at its core, is about Lindeman's healing journey as it documents her personal process of reconnecting with herself."

Several publications gave it four star or less, or a percentage rating of 70, such as SputnikMusic, which wrote that "As a passive experience, Humanhood is airy, charming and palateable," Mojo Magazine, which pointed out that "Even if she can't quite make sense of it all, Lindeman owns what happened to her with this superbly honed musical novella, and does her best to stumble on," and Slant Magazine that assessed Humanhood as capturing "the feeling of looking at oneself through a distorted mirror, trying to bring mind and body into unison."

The album received highly favorable ratings from a few publications, such as Paste Magazine, which rated it 8.3 out of 10 and expressed in a thorough review of the album that it "shifts its focus from external anxieties to a paralyzing internal strife, and evokes a far more compelling range of reference points (referring to style comparisons with Joni Mitchell)," and Clash Magazine, which gave it a rating of 9 out of 10 and described it as "the most full-throated creation from the Weather Station to date. The relief is that they still have something really worth saying, which makes the album an early yardstick for all the releases to follow across the rest of the year," in addition to The Skinny, which rated it five stars, and referred to the album as "the desire to get back to the self, to reclaim both individual and collective humanhood."

Other reviews of the album included British magazine The Quietus, which wrote that "It's an album that, as much as it looks inwards lyrically, is finally just as universal as Weather Station's climate change-themed breakthrough album Ignorance, a remarkable achievement in itself." John Amen of The Line of Best Fit stated, "Humanhood spotlights a restless artist as she strives to reconcile minimalism and maximalism, all the while addressing the mysteries of self, other, and the world." No Depression called the album "a cacophonous plunge into the body as a processing plant for pain, joy, discomfort, sickness, and memory."

== Awards ==
The album was longlisted for the 2025 Polaris Music Prize, and was a Juno Award nominee for Adult Alternative Album of the Year at the Juno Awards of 2026.

== Track listing ==
All tracks are written by Tamara Lindeman, except where noted.

Humanhood track listing
No.	Title	Writer(s)	Length
1.	"Descent"	Lindeman; Kieran Adams; Ben Boye; Philippe Melanson; Karen Ng; Ben Whiteley	1:00
2.	"Neon Signs"		5:07
3.	"Mirror"		4:56
4.	"Window"		2:41
5.	"Passage"	Boye	0:48
6.	"Body Moves"		3:27
7.	"Ribbon"		3:18
8.	"Fleuve"		1:10
9.	"Humanhood"		4:11
10.	"Irreversible Damage"	Erin Orsztynova	5:36
11.	"Lonely"		4:36
12.	"Aurora"	Lindeman; Adams; Boye; Melanson; Ng; Whiteley	1:37
13.	"Sewing"		5:58
Total length:			44:25

== Personnel ==
Credits for Humanhood adapted from the album's Bandcamp profile.

- Tamara Lindeman – lead vocals, lyrics, and producer
- Marcus Paquin – producer, synthesizer, (track 10) and percussion (track 6)
- Julian Decorte – engineer
- Kieran Adams – drums and lyrics (tracks 1, 12)
- Ben Boye – piano, synthesizer, and lyrics (tracks 1, 5, 12)
- Philippe Melanson – percussion, drums, and lyrics (tracks 1, 12)
- Karen Ng – saxophone, clarinet, flute, and lyrics (tracks 1, 12)
- Ben Whiteley – lyrics (tracks 1, 12), guitar (tracks 6, 7), piano (track 6), drums (track 6), bass (track 1, 6, 12), synth (tracks 5, 6), mellotron (track 6), and perc (track 6)
- Erin Orsztynova – lead vocals (track 10)
- Sam Amidon – banjo (tracks 3, 9), and fiddle (tracks 6, 7)
- Jim Elkington – guitar (tracks 2, 3, 7)
- Thom Gill – guitar (tracks 6)
- Drew Jurecka – strings (tracks 2, 3, 9)
- Joseph Shabason – synthesizer (tracks 2, 3, 7, 13)
- Christine Bougie – guitar (track 11)
- Joseph Lorge – percussion (track 6), and bass (track 7)
- Nik Tjelios – sax (track 11), banjo (tracks 3, 9), and fiddle (tracks 6, 7)
