= Are You in Love? =

Studio album by Basia Bulat
- Released: March 27, 2020
- Studio: Hi-Dez Studios
- Length: 42:52
- Label: Secret City
- Producer: Jim James

Basia Bulat chronology
Good Advice (2016)	Are You in Love? (2020)

Are You in Love? is the fifth studio album by Canadian folk musician Basia Bulat. It was released on March 27, 2020 under Secret City Records.

== Critical reception ==
Professional ratings
Aggregate scores
Source	Rating
Metacritic	79/100
Review scores
Source	Rating
American Songwriter	3/5 stars
Exclaim!	7/10
MusicOMH	4/5 stars
NOW	4/5 Ns

Are You in Love was met with generally favourable reviews from critics. At Metacritic, which assigns a weighted average rating out of 100 to reviews from mainstream publications, this release received an average score of 79, based on 9 reviews.

The album received a Juno Award nomination for Adult Alternative Album of the Year at the Juno Awards of 2021.

== Track listing ==
Are You in Love track listing
No.	Title	Length
1.	"Are You in Love?"	4:29
2.	"Electric Roses"	4:33
3.	"Your Girl"	2:46
4.	"Light Years"	3:45
5.	"Homesick"	2:42
6.	"Hall of Mirrors"	3:13
7.	"I Believe it Now"	0:46
8.	"No Control"	3:59
9.	"Pale Blue"	3:06
10.	"Already Forgiven"	3:19
11.	"The Last Time"	2:56
12.	"Fables"	3:07
13.	"Love Is at the End of the World"	4:10

== Personnel ==
Credits adapted from Tidal.

- Basia Bulat – vocals
- Meghan Ann Uremovich – vocals
- Kevin Ratterman – engineering, mixing
- Jim James – producer
- Kris Knight – album art
