= Nour Bishouty =

Lebanese-Canadian artist

Nour Bishouty (born 1986, Amman, Jordan) is a Lebanese-Canadian multidisciplinary artist. She works in different media focusing mostly on video, writing, sculpture, and printed matter. Her interdisciplinary work explores notions of permission and articulation in cultural narratives overwritten by dispossession and displacement, and explores gaps in archival memory and the Western production of knowledge and fantasy. In her practice, she proposes artistic strategies that unsettle institutional conventions of classification, order, and the production of value. Bishouty's work is featured in the 13th Liverpool Biennial curated by Marie-Anne McQuay.

She received a Bachelor of Fine Arts degree (the University of Jordan) and a Master of Fine Arts degree (the University of Massachusetts). She participated in the Home Workspace Program at Ashkal Alwan in Beirut (2015).

She has exhibited her work at the GTA21 Triennial, Museum of Contemporary Art Toronto, Manif d'art la Biennale de Quebec; Cooper Cole, Gallery 44, Toronto; SAVAC: South Asian Visual Arts Centre, Toronto; Darat Al Funun, Amman; Casa Arabe, Madrid; the Mosaic Rooms, London; and the Beirut Art Centre, amongst others. Bishouty's work is in the permanent collections of the National Gallery of Canada's Library and Archives, and the Burnaby Art Gallery. amongst others.

== Artistic career ==
Bishouty's 2021 book "1—130: Selected Works Ghassan Bishouty b. 1941 Safad, Palestine — d. 2004 Amman, Jordan," revisits the artistic oeuvre and personal archives of her late father, Ghassan Bishouty a Palestinian-Lebanese artist whose work was little known during his lifetime. The book constitutes an improvised study into a collection of artworks and envisions a partly speculative narrative of the late artist's life as an intimate act of commemoration, while at the same time looking into the parameters and complexities of artistic legacy and obscurity. It was co-published by Art Metropole in Toronto and Moto Books in Berlin.

In an essay review by scholar and art historian Tammer El-Sheikh, Bishouty’s work is described as stylistically diverse and compared with Edward's Said’s notion of a “late style”: "from one generation to the next, we have an example of a late style that emerges with the young, on the shoulders of the dead, so late it is posthumous, in fact, but freer in its versatility as a result of having begun anew."

Bishouty's work was included in the inaugural triennial of MOCA the Museum of Contemporary Art Toronto GTA2021 and the 2024 Quebec City Biennale Manif d'art. Bishouty presented "On the count of three," a video work commissioned for The City of Toronto's 2024 Nuit Blanche festival in the Waterfront East exhibition, "Cat's Cradle."

In 2016, she was the inaugural artist in residence at Twenty-three Days at Sea, a traveling artist residency initiated by Access Gallery in Vancouver that took place aboard a freighter ship traveling across the Pacific Ocean In 2023, she was the Toronto artist in residence at the Ace Hotel in collaboration with Toronto's Images Festival.
