= Pink Strat =

Studio album by Bahamas
- Released: July 21, 2009
- Recorded: 2008
- Genres: Folk, indie, alt-country

Bahamas chronology
Pink Strat (2009)	Barchords (2012)

Pink Strat is the debut album from Canadian musician Bahamas. It was nominated for both a Juno and a Polaris Music Prize in 2010.

== Track listing ==
No.	Title	Length
1.	"Lonely Loves"	2:03
2.	"Hockey Teeth"	2:36
3.	"Southern Drawl"	2:49
4.	"For Good Reason"	3:44
5.	"You're Bored, I'm Old"	2:42
6.	"Sunshine Blues"	2:22
7.	"Already Yours"	2:07
8.	"What's Worse"	3:31
9.	"Let the Good Times Roll"	1:36
10.	"Try, Tried, Trying"	3:57
11.	"Till the Morning"	2:02
12.	"Whole Wide World"	2:35
