= Altameda =

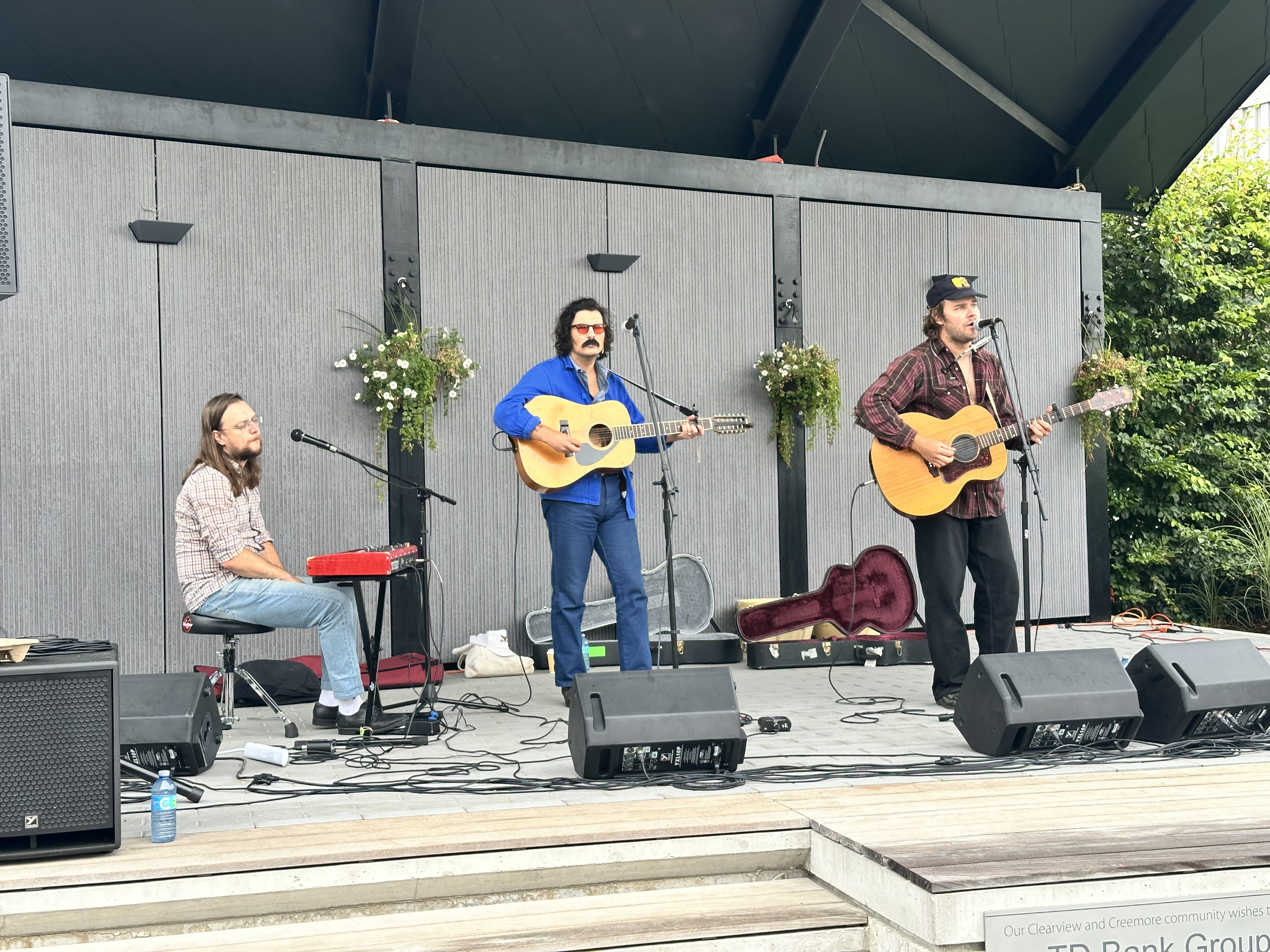
- Altameda in Creemore, Ontario, Canada, 2025

Altameda is a Canadian folk-rock and alternative country duo, consisting of singer-songwriter Troy Snaterse and drummer Erik Grice. They are most noted for their 2022 album Born Losers, which was a shortlisted Juno Award nominee for Adult Alternative Album of the Year at the Juno Awards of 2023.

== History ==
The group was formed in the mid-2010s in Edmonton, Alberta, when Snaterse recruited several friends to assist in recording what was originally intended as a solo album. The other two original members were keyboardist Matthew Kraus and bassist Todd Andrews. Choosing instead to proceed as a full band, they released their debut album Dirty Rain in 2016. They followed up in 2019 with the album Time Hasn't Changed You.

Snaterse and Grice moved to Toronto, Ontario. in 2020, opting to continue as a duo after Kraus and Andrews chose not to follow. Born Losers, their third album, was released in April 2022, and was followed in October by Born Losers Live, an EP of several live performances from the album's supporting concert tour.

The band released their fourth album, Crazy Blue, in September 2025.
