= Heart of My Own =

Studio album by Basia Bulat
- Released: January 26, 2010
- Genre: Folk; Americana
- Length: 39:54
- Label: Secret City Records
- Producer: Howard Bilerman

Basia Bulat chronology
Oh, My Darling (2007)	Heart of My Own (2010)	Tall Tall Shadow (2013)

Heart of My Own is the second full-length album by Canadian singer-songwriter Basia Bulat, released on January 26, 2010, on Secret City Records. The tracks "Gold Rush" and "Run" were released as singles to promote the album.

== Track listing ==
1. "Go On" – 3:28
2. "Run" – 3:02
3. "Sugar and Spice" – 3:23
4. "Gold Rush" – 3:33
5. "Heart of My Own" – 3:49
6. "Sparrow" – 2:23
7. "If Only You" – 2:47
8. "I'm Forgetting Everyone" – 3:24
9. "The Shore" – 4:44
10. "Once More, for the Dollhouse" – 3:39
11. "Walk You Down" – 3:10
12. "If It Rains" – 2:30
13. "Hush" (Bonus Track) – 2:23

== Critical reception ==
Professional ratings
Aggregate scores
Source	Rating
Metacritic	72/100
Review scores
Source	Rating
AllMusic	3/5 stars
Drowned in Sound	(8/10)
Filter	84%
musicOMH	3.5/5 stars
Pitchfork Media	(7.0/10)
Prefix	(8.0/10)
Tiny Mix Tapes	3.5/5 marks

The album was well-reviewed, having an aggregate score of 72 at Metacritic.

The album was a longlisted nominee for the 2010 Polaris Music Prize.

Heart of My Own was awarded the second spot in Exclaim!'s 2010 Folk & Country Year in Review music rankings. The album was praised for the rumbling, rollicking edge in many of its songs, "The arresting vocal and autoharp simplicity of "The Shore" demonstrates the fundamental talent at work, one so transcendent that it hints at a timeless soulfulness that Bulat is still at the outset of channelling."
