= The Weather Station (album) =

Studio album by The Weather Station
- Released: October 6, 2017
- Studios: Hotel2Tango, Montreal, Quebec
- Length: 37:42
- Label: Paradise of Bachelors
- Producer: Tamara Hope

The Weather Station chronology
Loyalty (2015)	The Weather Station (2017)	Ignorance (2021)

The Weather Station is the fourth studio album by Canadian band the Weather Station. It was released on October 6, 2017 through Paradise of Bachelors.

The album was a Juno Award nominee for Contemporary Roots Album of the Year at the Juno Awards of 2018.

== Reception ==
Professional ratings
Aggregate scores
Source	Rating
AnyDecentMusic?	8.0/10
Metacritic	85/100
Review scores
Source	Rating
The A.V. Club	B
Drowned in Sound	9/10
Exclaim!	9/10
Mojo	4/5 stars
Paste	8.4/10
Pitchfork	8.0/10
Q	4/5 stars
Record Collector	4/5 stars
Uncut	9/10

=== Accolades ===
Publication	Accolade	Rank	Ref.
Exclaim!	Top 10 Folk/Country Albums of 2017	1	
The Line of Best Fit	Top 50 Albums of 2017	40	
Spin	Top 50 Albums of 2017	40	
Stereogum	Top 50 Albums of 2017	38	
Uncut Magazine	Top 75 Albums of 2017	4	
Uproxx	Top 50 Albums of 2017	43	

== Track listing ==
No.	Title	Length
1.	"Free"	3:08
2.	"Thirty"	3:41
3.	"You and I (On the Other Side of the World)"	4:40
4.	"Kept It All to Myself"	3:10
5.	"Impossible"	3:25
6.	"Power"	4:36
7.	"Complicit"	3:34
8.	"Black Flies"	2:12
9.	"I Don't Know What to Say"	2:49
10.	"In an Hour"	2:55
11.	"The Most Dangerous Thing About You"	3:32
