= Sad Hunk =

Studio album by Bahamas
- Released: October 9, 2020
- Genre: Folk rock
- Length: 31:59
- Label: Brushfire
- Producer: Afie Jurvanen

Bahamas chronology
| Earthtones (2018) | Sad Hunk (2020) |

Singles from Sad Hunk
- 1. "Own Alone"; 2. "Trick to Happy"

Sad Hunk is the fifth studio album by Canadian musician Bahamas, released October 9, 2020. The album's release was preceded by the preview single "Own Alone" in August, with "Trick to Happy" following in September.

The album won the Juno Award for Adult Alternative Album of the Year at the Juno Awards of 2021.

== Track listing ==
All tracks are written by Afie Jurvanen

| No. | Title | Length |
|---|---|---|
| 1. | "Trick to Happy" | 3:24 |
| 2. | "Own Alone" | 3:15 |
| 3. | "Less Than Love" | 4:12 |
| 4. | "Done Did Me No Good" | 2:51 |
| 5. | "Half Your Love" | 2:24 |
| 6. | "Up with the Jones" | 4:10 |
| 7. | "Not Cool Anymore" | 2:06 |
| 8. | "Can't Complain" | 1:54 |
| 9. | "Fair Share" | 2:53 |
| 10. | "Wisdom of the World" | 4:45 |
| Total length: | | 31:59 |

== Charts ==
| Chart (2020) | Peak position |
|---|---|
| Canadian Albums (Billboard) | 67 |
