= The Weather Station =

Canadian folk band

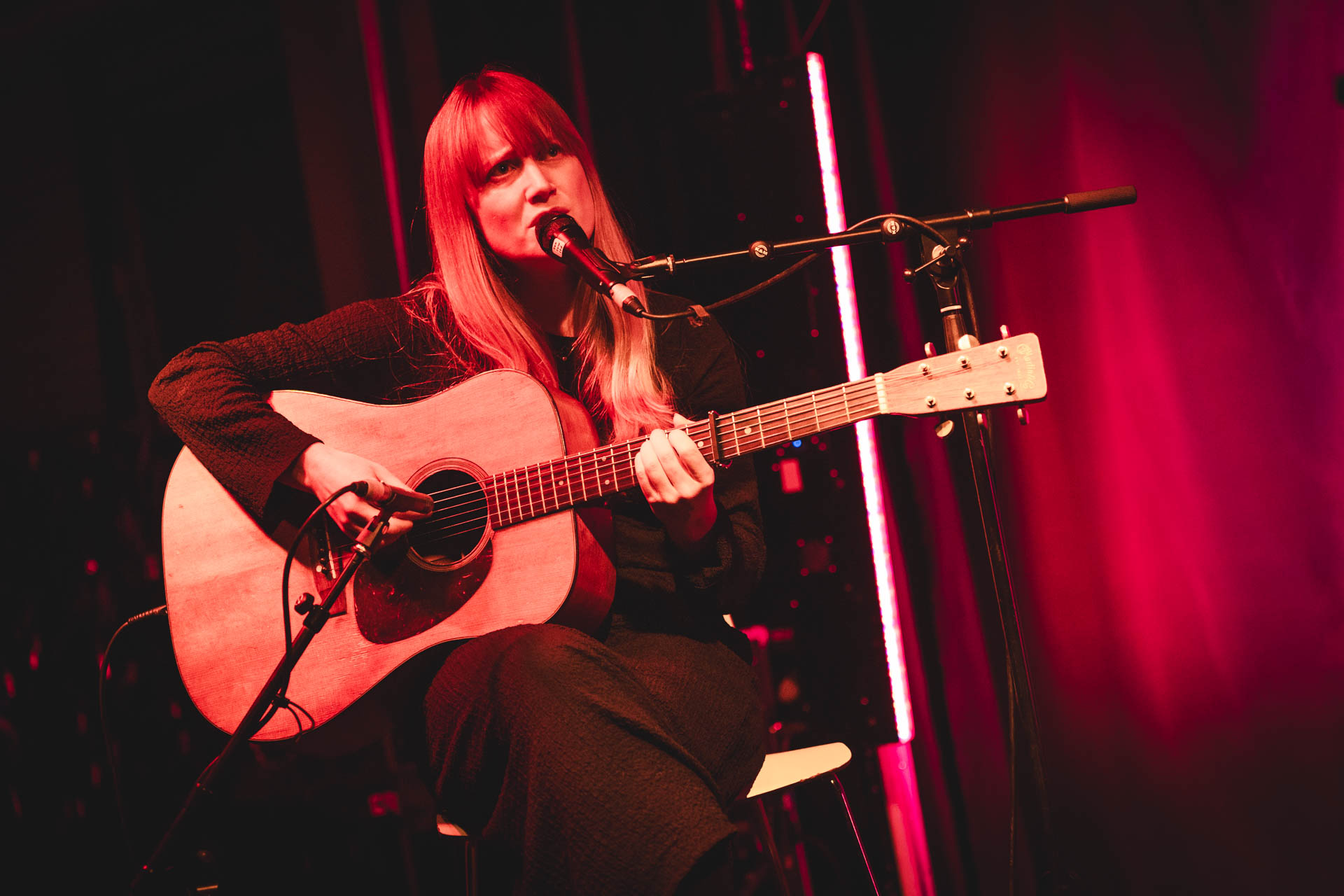
- Tamara Lindeman of the Weather Station, performing live

Background information
- Origin: Toronto
- Genres: Folk music; experimental music
- Years active: 2006–present
- Labels: Fat Possum (current); previously Paradise of Bachelors (U.S., Europe, Australia); Outside (Canada); You've Changed
- Members: Tamara Lindeman; Ben Whiteley; Will Kidman; Johnny Spence; Christine Bougie; Karen Ng; Evan Cartwright; Kieran Adams
- Past members: Jack Donovan; Simon Borer; Dwight Schenk; Elaine Kelly; Adrian Cook; Ian Kehoe
- Website: theweatherstation.net

The Weather Station is a Canadian folk music band fronted by Tamara Lindeman, formed in 2006. Band membership has changed over the years, but as of 2022 the lineup includes Lindeman (lead vocals, piano), Ben Whiteley (bass), Johnny Spence (keyboards), Will Kidman (guitar), Christine Bougie (guitar), Karen Ng (saxophone, clarinet), Evan Cartwright (drums), and Kieran Adams (drums).

== History ==
Tamara Lindeman was born in Ontario in 1984. She started in acting before forming her band.

The band's debut album The Line was released in 2009. Their second album, All of It Was Mine, made in collaboration with Daniel Romano, was released in 2011.

Lindeman was a nominee for the 2013 SOCAN Songwriting Prize for The Weather Station's song "Mule in the Flowers", co-written with Steve Lambke.

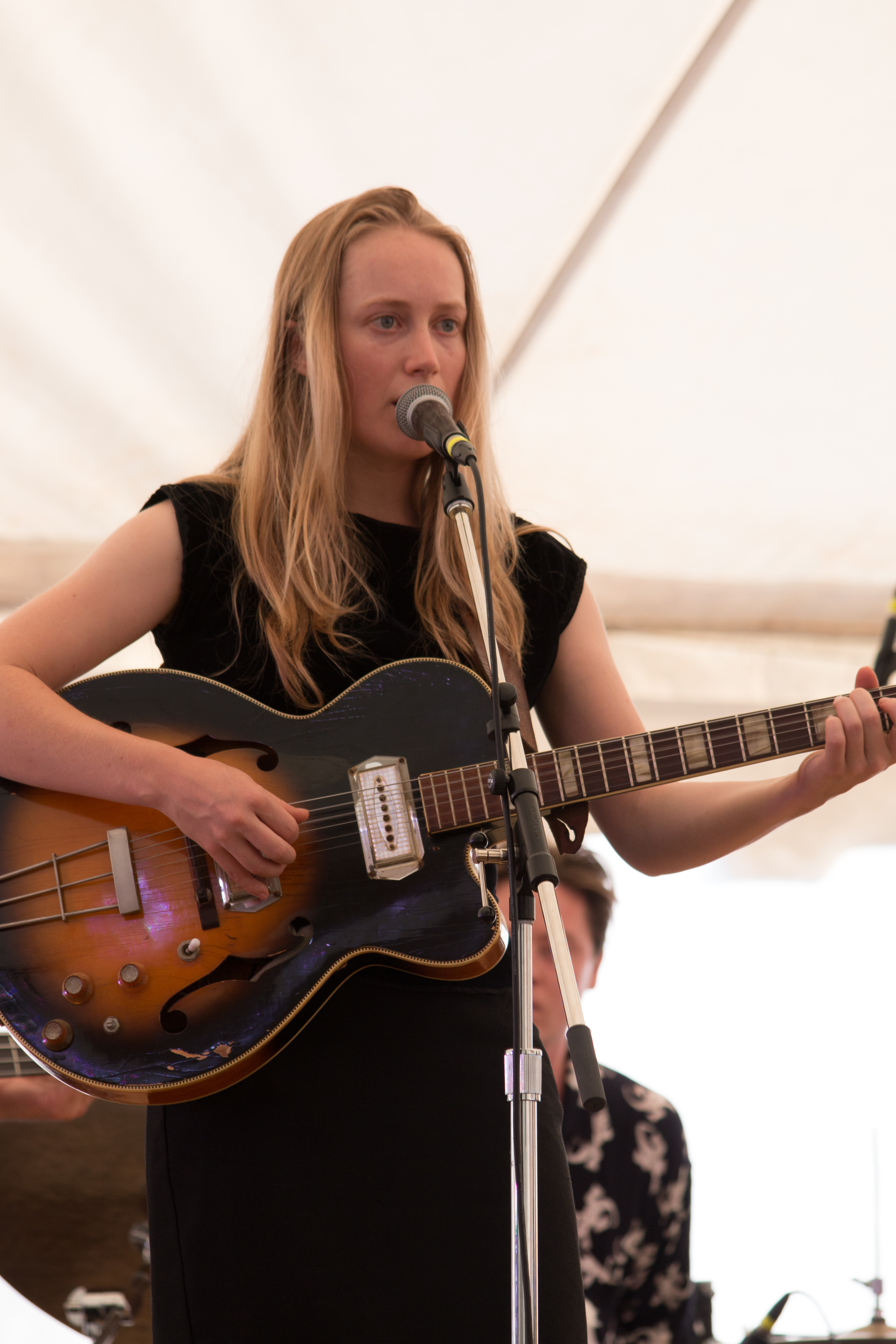
Frontwoman Tamara Lindeman performing at the 2015 Hillside Festival

The band's third album, Loyalty, was recorded at La Frette studios near Paris, France, with Afie Jurvanen and Robbie Lackritz, who have worked on albums with Bahamas, Feist, Zeus, and Jason Collett. Loyalty was released on May 5, 2015, on Paradise of Bachelors (U.S. and worldwide) and Outside Music (Canada).

The self-titled fourth studio album was released in October 2017, on the Paradise of Bachelors (U.S. and worldwide) and Outside Music (Canada). The 11 tracks are purest indie folk. On October 18, 2018, Live At Union was released independently as a limited edition available on Bandcamp.

The band's fifth album Ignorance was released worldwide on Fat Possum Records on February 5, 2021, and a small part (digital or vinyl only) on Next Door Records in Canada. The ten tracks were recorded with two percussionists, a saxophonist and a flutist, plus bass, keys, and guitar. Songwriter Tamara Lindeman wrote and produced all the songs. The album's theme is based on Lindeman's contemplation of the global climate crisis. Lindeman explained the album's title in an NPR interview as being "about this process of moving through denial into understanding". It was shortlisted for the 2021 Polaris Music Prize and nominated for a 2022 Juno Award.

On March 4, 2022, the band released their sixth album, How Is It That I Should Look at the Stars, also through Fat Possum. The album consists of ten songs written simultaneously with those on Ignorance but deemed too dissimilar to be included on that album; Lindeman called the album "the moon to Ignorance's sun". The album was recorded in March 2020 in Toronto. It was nominated for a 2023 Juno Award.

The Weather Station's seventh album, Humanhood, was released everywhere on January 17, 2025. The album was longlisted for the 2025 Polaris Music Prize, and was a Juno Award nominee for Adult Alternative Album of the Year at the Juno Awards of 2026.

== Discography ==
=== Albums ===
Title	Details	Peak chart positions	
Title	Details	BEL	UK
The Line	Released: April 29, 2009; Label: Self-released; Format: CD, digital download	—	—
All of It Was Mine	Released: August 16, 2011; Label: You've Changed; Format: CD, LP, digital download	—	—
Loyalty	Released: May 12, 2015; Label: Paradise Bachelors; Format: CD, LP, digital download	—	—
The Weather Station	Released: October 6, 2017; Label: Paradise Bachelors; Format: CD, LP, digital download	—	—
Ignorance	Released: February 5, 2021; Label: Fat Possum; Format: CD, LP, digital download	136	61
How Is It That I Should Look at the Stars	Released: March 4, 2022; Label: Fat Possum; Format: CD, LP, digital download	—	—
Humanhood	Released: January 17, 2025; Label: Fat Possum; Format: CD, LP, digital download	—	—
"—" denotes releases that did not chart

=== Extended plays ===
- East EP (2008)
- Duets #1–3 (2013)
- What Am I Going to Do with Everything I Know EP (2014)

=== Singles ===
- "Floodplain" (2015)
- "Thirty" (2017)
- "Kept It All to Myself" (2017)
- "You and I (On the Other Side of the World)" (2017)
- "Impossible" (2017)
- "Robber" (2020)
- "Tried to Tell You" (2020)
- "Atlantic" (2021)
- "Parking Lot" (2021)
- "Endless Time" (2022)
- "To Talk About" (2022)
- “Moonlight” (2024)
- “Airport” (2025)
- ”Only The Truth” (2025)
