= Tall Tall Shadow =

Studio album by Basia Bulat
- Released: September 30, 2013
- Genre: Folk; Americana
- Length: 34:15
- Label: Secret City Records
- Producer: Tim Kingsbury, Mark Lawson

Basia Bulat chronology
Heart of My Own (2010)	Tall Tall Shadow (2013)	Good Advice (2016)

Tall Tall Shadow is the third full-length album by Canadian singer-songwriter Basia Bulat, released September 30, 2013 on Secret City Records. Some early copies were sold with a limited-edition bonus disc, titled Live in London, which featured live performances of five songs from the original album.

The album was produced by Tim Kingsbury and Mark Lawson.

The album was inspired in part by the death of someone in Bulat's personal life, although she has not provided extensive detail about it to the media. At the time of the death, Bulat had an entirely different album ready to record, but felt that she could no longer connect to the material. Instead, she decided to make an album which acknowledged the pain she was going through while ultimately being hopeful and uplifting.

Some of the album's tracks were recorded in a Royal Canadian Legion hall in Toronto, Ontario's Beaches neighbourhood.

The album was a shortlisted nominee for the Juno Award for Adult Alternative Album of the Year at the Juno Awards of 2014, and for the 2014 Polaris Music Prize.

== Track listing ==
All tracks are written by Basia Bulat.

No.	Title	Length
1.	"Tall Tall Shadow"	4:03
2.	"Five, Four"	3:59
3.	"Promise Not to Think About Love"	2:23
4.	"It Can't Be You"	3:58
5.	"Wires"	3:31
6.	"The City With No Rivers"	3:23
7.	"Someone"	3:15
8.	"Paris or Amsterdam"	3:05
9.	"Never Let Me Go"	4:14
10.	"From Now On"	2:24

== Live in London ==
1. "The City With No Rivers"
2. "Tall Tall Shadow"
3. "Five, Four"
4. "Someone"
5. "It Can't Be You"
