= Lisa Conway =

Canadian singer-songwriter, musician and producer

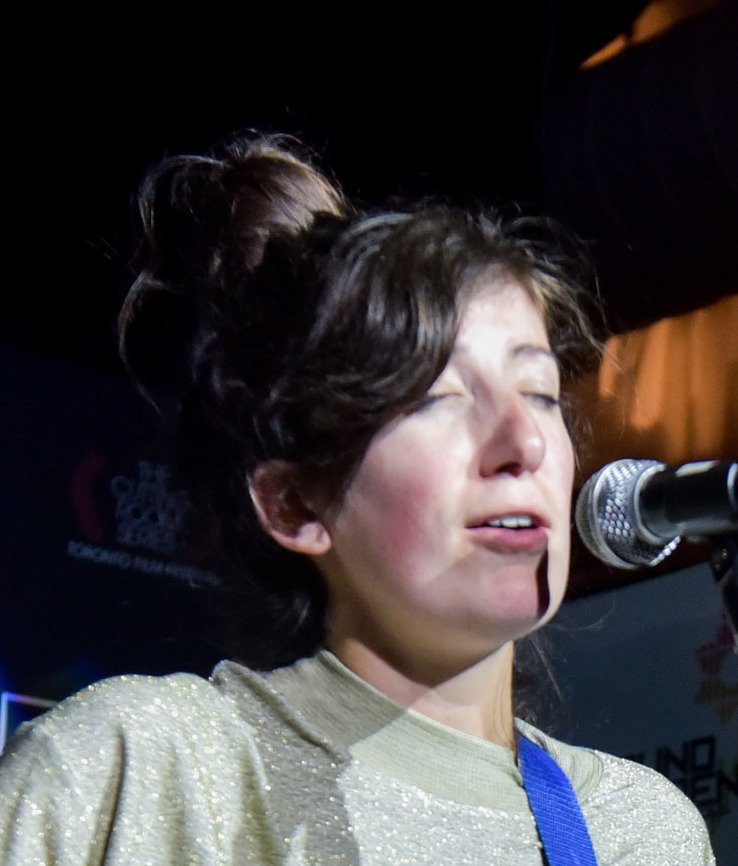
- Lisa Conway in 2016
- Education: York University, Queen's University Belfast
- Website: www.lconofficial.com

Lisa Conway-Bühler, also known as LCON, is a Canadian musician, vocalist, composer and producer. She has performed as part of The Owle Bird, Chrome and the Ice Queen, and is the former singer and lyricist of Toronto-based Del Bel.

== Early life and education ==
Conway grew up in northern British Columbia where she started playing music as a child. She began playing the violin at the age of four and learned to play the guitar before developing an interest in songwriting. Her father worked as an elementary school music teacher and at the age of 13 she used his recording equipment to record and produced an album for her high school band.

Influenced by Canadian composer Oliver Schroer while attending camp as a teenager, she later moved to Ontario to attend York University in Toronto, where Schroer had studied. Conway holds a BFA of in music from York University and an MA in Sonic Arts from Queen's University Belfast, Northern Ireland. She completed a residency with the Canadian Film Center in 2016. Two years later she was selected to participate in the Red Bull Music Academy in Berlin, Germany.

== Career ==
Conway has released music as The Owle Bird, the Twin Peaks-inspired project Chrome and the Ice Queen and, since 2012, as L CON. She began singing with Toronto-based Del Bel in 2011, in addition to taking on songwriting duties alongside bandleader Tyler Belluz. Toronto Star reviewer Ben Rayner called the band's release Oneiric "one of the most accomplished albums, Canadian or otherwise, released in 2011." She stepped away from Del Bel in 2017 to focus on her solo work shortly after the release of the band's third album, III.

In addition to writing and production work, Conway frequently collaborates with other artists and incorporates multi-media elements to her performances and releases. The 2016 video for her song "The Form of Space", directed by Victoria Long, featured an amateur dance troupe based in Guelph, Ontario. She worked with Long on a second video in 2018 following the release for the L CON album Insecurities in Being.

During the mid-2010s Conway co-owned and operated Wildlife Sanctuary Sound, a recording and production studio in Grey County, with musician and producer Andrew Collins. They met as music students at York University. The first album recorded and produced in the studio was Conway's 2016 L CON release Moon Milk.

Playing, performing and producing music since her teens, Conway has been vocal about her experiences as a woman in the music industry. In a 2016 interview with The Silhouette she explained that: "As a woman in the music industry a lot of people make assumptions about you and I found especially as a vocalist I get pegged as somebody who just sings; who doesn’t know anything about recording or production." The sentiment was echoed in a 2018 interview with Canadian music blog Grayowl Point, where she explained that her production work had been glossed over for the majority of her career.

=== L CON ===
Conway performs as L CON both alone and with a band that includes Andrew Collins, Jordan Howard and Karen Ng. She began releasing music under the moniker in 2012 with the six-song EP The Ballad Project, which she wrote, arranged, orchestrated and co-produced the contributions of 20 musicians. It was followed a year later by The Ballads Reimagined, an electronic reinterpretation of the album with two new songs. Released by Daps Records, the EP was recorded by Conway while living in Toronto and mixed by Ohbijou bass player Heather Kirby.

L CON's 2016 release Moon Milk was based on Italo Calvino's 1965 science fiction short-story collection Cosmicomics. Each of the album's songs is inspired by and named after one of the stories in the collection. They were written during a three week residency in Sackville, New Brunswick, during the summer of 2013. Conway's third album as L CON, Insecurities in Being, was released on May 25, 2018. Writing for Now, reviewer Mark Streeter noted the refinement Conway brought to her work, explaining that the release was "recorded like a rock record but treated and mixed with pop sensibilities [...] full of intricate arrangements and careful playing".

The Isolator was released in 2023 on Idée Fixe Records. Featuring contributions by Cedric Noel, Karen Ng and Isla Craig, writing for the album began during the COVID-19 pandemic at Conway's studio in Guelph, Ontario.

== Discography ==
L CON

- The Isolator (2023)
- Insecurities in Being (2018)
- Moon Milk (2016)
- The Ballads Reimagined (2013)
- The Ballad Project (2012)

Del Bel

- III (2017)
- Del Bel (2015)
- Oneiric (2011)

Chome and the Ice Queen

- Diane (2011)

Owle Bird

- The Abesence Of (2008)
