= Oh, My Darling =

Studio album by Basia Bulat
- Released: April 30, 2007
- Recorded: January – September 2006
- Genres: Indie pop Folk
- Length: 35:00
- Label: Rough Trade Records/Hardwood Records
- Producer: Howard Bilerman

Basia Bulat chronology
Oh, My Darling (2007)	Heart of My Own (2010)

Professional ratings
Review scores
Source	Rating
Pitchfork Media	6.5/10

Oh, My Darling is the debut album by Canadian singer-songwriter Basia Bulat. It was recorded in Montreal and produced by Howard Bilerman, whom Bulat met in 2006 and asked to work with. It was originally released April 30, 2007 on Rough Trade Records in the United Kingdom. It then saw a Canadian release June 4, 2007 on Hardwood Records, the vanity label of fellow Canadian musician Hayden. On February 5, 2008, the album was released on Rough Trade Records in the United States.

The album was a nominee for the 2008 Polaris Music Prize.

== Track listing ==
1. "Before I Knew" – 1:12
2. "I Was a Daughter" – 2:54
3. "Little Waltz" – 2:52
4. "December" – 2:49
5. "Snakes and Ladders" – 3:09
6. "Oh, My Darling" – 1:23
7. "In the Night" – 3:00
8. "Little One" – 3:18
9. "Why Can't It Be Mine" – 3:30
10. "The Pilgriming Vine" – 4:36
11. "La-Da-Da" – 3:18
12. "Birds of Paradise" – 4:09
13. "A Secret" – 2:06
