= Museum of Contemporary Art Toronto Canada =

- Former name: Museum of Contemporary Canadian Art
- Established: 1999
- Location: 158 Sterling Road; Toronto, Ontario
- Coordinates: 43.65463°N 79.445121°W
- Type: Art museum
- Director: Kathleen Bartels
- Curator: Rui Mateus Amaral
- Website: http://www.mocca.ca

The Museum of Contemporary Art Toronto Canada (MOCA), formerly known as the Museum of Contemporary Canadian Art (MOCCA), is a museum and art gallery in Toronto, Ontario. It is an independent, registered charitable organization.

== History ==
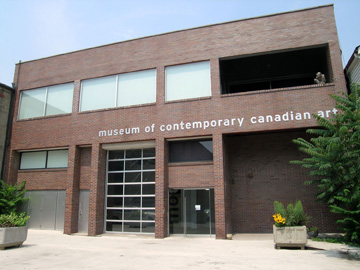
The Museum of Contemporary Canadian Art's former location in a repurposed textile factory on Queen Street West.

The museum, originally known as the Museum of Contemporary Canadian Art (MOCCA), was founded from the former Art Gallery of North York in 1999. In 2005, MOCCA relocated to a repurposed textile factory in the West Queen West Art + Design District in downtown Toronto. The City of Toronto government funded the half-million-dollar renovation of the building.

In 2015, with its building about to be demolished and replaced by condominiums, MOCCA hosted an interactive exhibit by Dean Baldwin entitled Queen West Yacht Club. At its former location on Queen West, the museum functioned as a hub for creative exchange and played a critical role in shaping the city's contemporary art scene. Through a commitment to collaborative partnerships with leading like-minded artists, organizations, institutions, and festivals from Toronto and further afield, MOCCA connected the city to a national and global network of peers.

MOCCA featured the work of over 1,100 Canadian and other international artists, hosted 200+ exhibitions, and welcomed 40,000 annual visitors. As the lease on Queen West wound down, the need to move provided an opportunity to seek a larger space that could accommodate the museum's ever-growing aspirations and significance.

In 2016, the museum changed its name to the Museum of Contemporary Art Toronto Canada (MOCA). In September 2018, MOCA moved into a 55,000 square foot facility in a renovated former factory in the Lower Junction district. The museum received funding from the Canada Cultural Spaces Fund.

The museum is affiliated with the Canadian Museums Association, the Ontario Museum Association, and the Ontario Association of Art Galleries.

== Award ==
During its time on Queen Street West, the museum presented the MOCCA Award in Contemporary Art. In 2010, the award was given to Edward Burtynsky.

== Exhibits ==
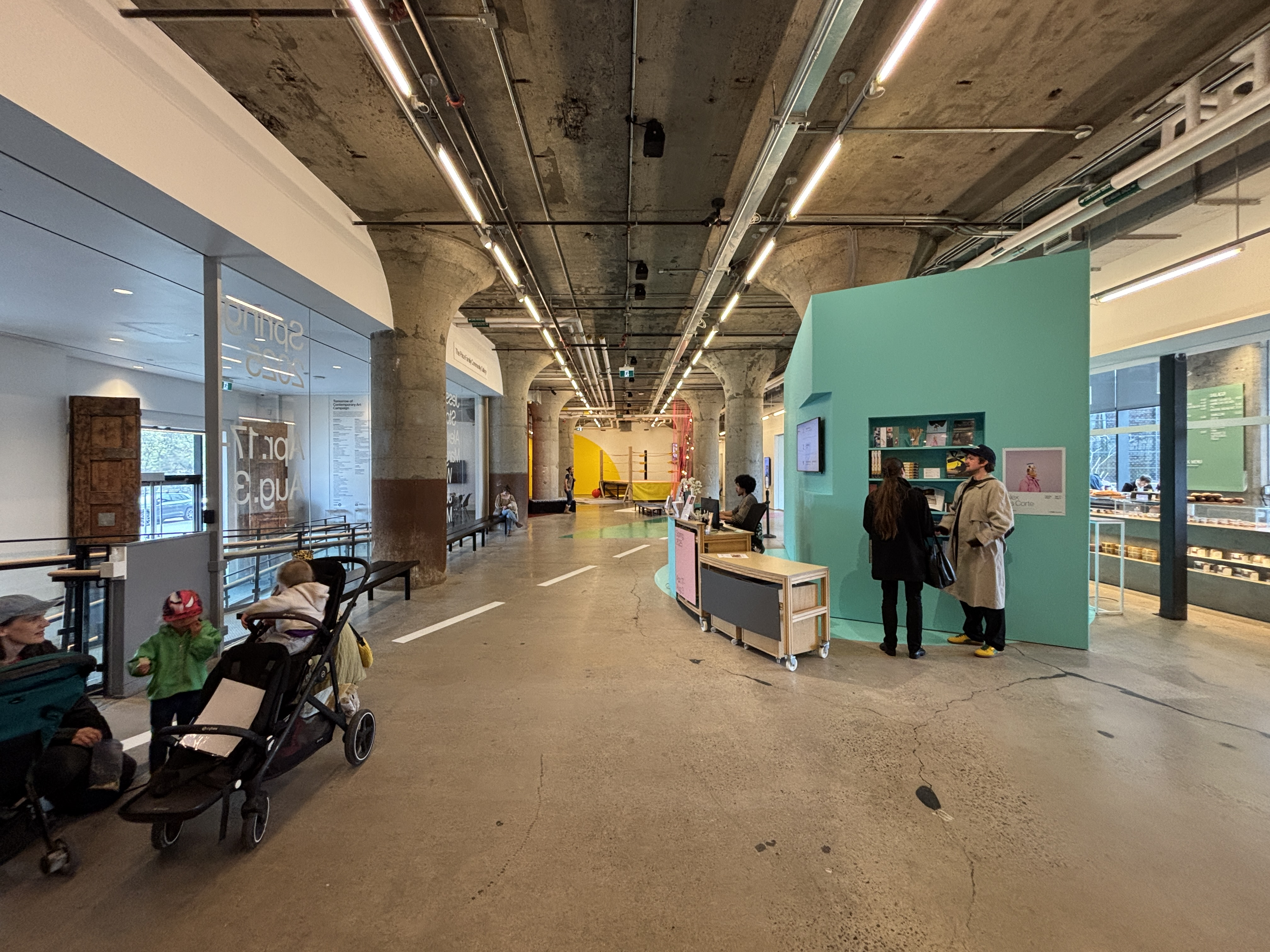
Level 1 reception

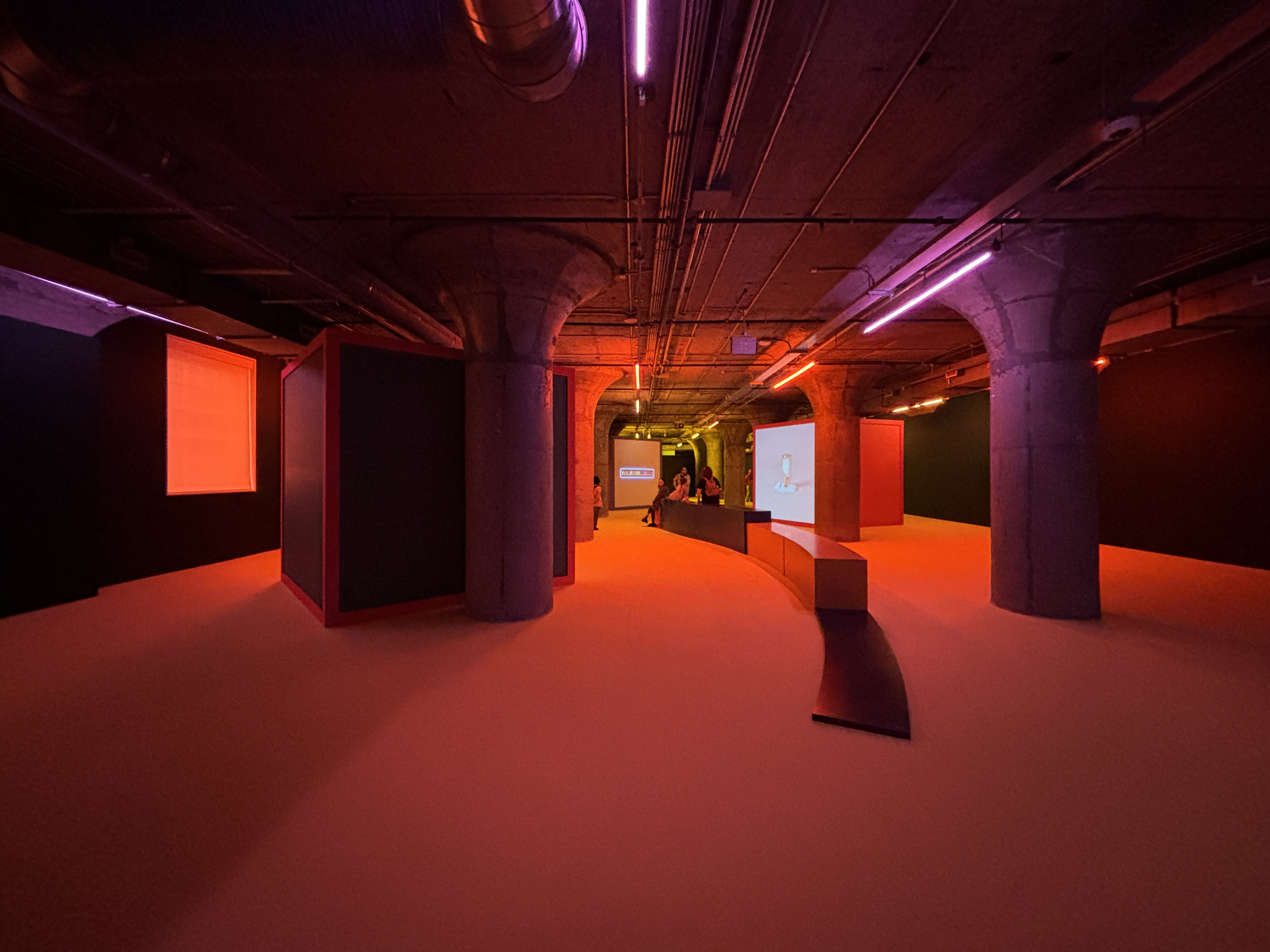
Level 2 exhibition space

The museum's former Queen Street West location featured two large exhibition spaces, a 5,000 sq ft (460 m^{2}) Main Space and a 1,000 sq ft (93 m^{2}) Project Room. More than 80 exhibits and projects were presented in this space, involving about 800 artists, including Suzy Lake and Kris Knight. The museum has also mounted group exhibitions of work by non-Canadian artists. Since 2001, the museum has also presented exhibitions and projects in the United States, China, Taiwan, France, Germany, Italy, and Spain.

== See also ==
- Art in Canada
- Contemporary art museums
- List of art museums
- List of museums in Toronto
