= 1977 (band) =

Canadian indie pop band

- Origin: Toronto
- Genre: indie pop
- Years active: 2004–2015
- Label: Fontana North
- Members: Julie Kendall; Brent Hough
- Past members: Matthew Rubba; Owen Marchildon
- Website: https://nineteenseventyseven.ca

1977 was a Canadian indie pop band, based in Port Credit, Ontario, whose core members were singer and songwriter Julie Kendall and instrumentalist Brent Hough.

== History ==
Kendall had been learning organ parts to The Beach Boys' song California Girls, and began writing her own songs in a similar style. Kendall and Hough, who are married, formed 1977 in 2004 to perform and record these songs.

In 2009, the band released its self-titled nine-track debut album, Nineteen Seventy-Seven, which was a nominee for Adult Alternative Album of the Year at the Juno Awards of 2010. That year Kendall also performed alone as part of the Pitter Patter Festival in Toronto.

In 2011, they independently released the EP So Is the Sea; on it, they were backed by drummer Jordan Bruce and bassist Owen Marchildon, members of Hough's band Bellevue, and the album was recorded in the family's barn. That year 1977 performed took part in Canadian Music Week in Toronto.

On October 9, 2015, 1977 released their fourth album Twister.

The band went quiet in 2015. As of 2021, 1977 is being presented as 'Julie Kendall, an independent artist'.

== Discography ==
- Rock N' Roll (2008)
- Nineteen Seventy-Seven (2009)
- So Is the Sea (EP), (2011)
- Twister (2015), Fontana North
