= Bahamas (musician) =

Canadian musician

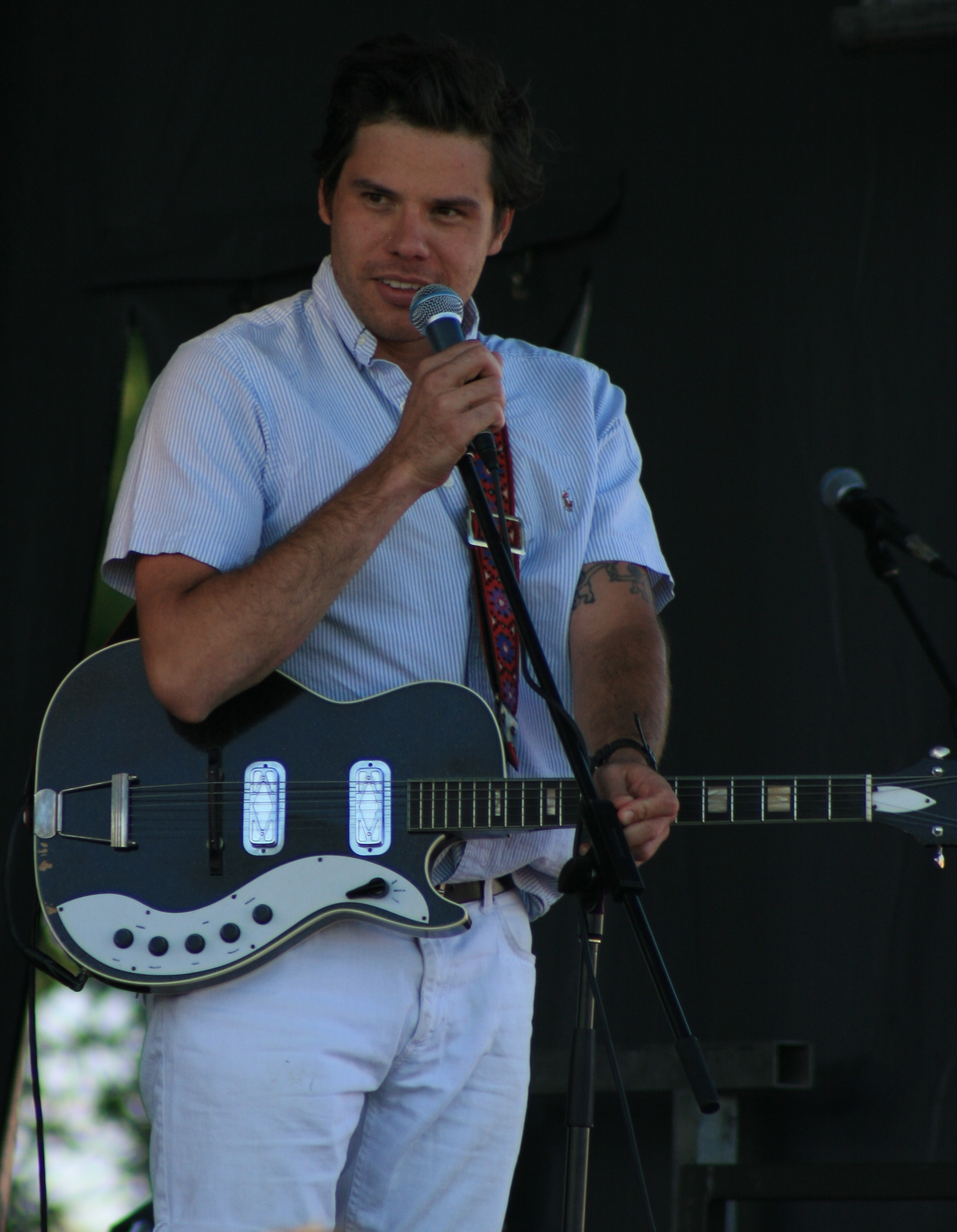
- Bahamas at the 2010 Wolfe Island Music Festival

Background information
- Born: Afie Jurvanen; April 28, 1981 (age 45); Toronto, Ontario, Canada
- Genres: Folk, indie folk
- Occupation: Musician
- Instruments: Vocals, guitar
- Years active: 2000s–present
- Label: Brushfire Records
- Website: bahamasmusic.net

Afie Jurvanen (born April 28, 1981), known by his stage name Bahamas, is a Canadian musician.

== Early life ==
Jurvanen was born in Toronto and raised in Barrie, Ontario. He speaks Finnish fluently, and he also has a Finnish passport.

== Career ==
Jurvanen taught himself guitar. He worked with a variety of musicians including The Lumineers, City and Colour, Feist, Howie Beck, Jason Collett, Jack Johnson, The Weather Station, and Zeus. Downtown Music Publishing represents Bahamas' songs. Jurvanen recorded his debut album — Pink Strat, in a cabin in rural Ontario in 2008. He released the album under the name Bahamas in 2009 and was subsequently nominated for a 2010 Juno Award for Roots & Traditional Album of the Year – Solo.

Bahamas' second album – Barchords, was released on February 7, 2012. The album received nomination at the 2013 Juno Awards for the Adult Alternative Album of the Year. Jurvanen received a nomination for Songwriter of the Year for the tracks "Be My Witness", "Caught Me Thinking", and "Lost in the Light".

Jurvanen released his third album, Bahamas Is Afie on August 19, 2014. The album received first place on Q's Top 20 Albums of 2014. Bahamas Is Afie received a nomination for Adult Alternative Album of the Year At the Juno Awards of 2015, and Jurvanen received nomination for Songwriter of the Year for "All the Time", "Bitter Memories" and "Stronger Than That". He won the awards in both categories.

Jurvanen tours with drummer Jason Tait and backing vocalist Felicity Williams. Bahamas opened for Jack Johnson, Robert Plant, Wilco, The Lumineers and City and Colour.

Jurvanen released his fourth album, Earthtones on January 19, 2018. Bahamas began their Canadian tour for Earthtones on January 18, 2018, the Earthtones World Tour and recruited Zach Gill to open the shows.

Jurvanen released his fifth studio album, Sad Hunk, on October 9, 2020. The album won the Juno Award for Adult Alternative Album of the Year at the Juno Awards of 2021.

Jurvanen released his sixth studio album, Bootcut, on September 15, 2023. Bahamas performed on the second episode of the 28th season of The Bachelor.

In 2024 he appeared as a guest musician on New Kind of Familiar, the second album by Clever Hopes.

Jurvanen released his seventh studio album, My Second Last Album, on October 24, 2025. The album was cowinner, with Begonia's Fantasy Life, of the Juno award for Adult Alternative Album of the Year at the Juno Awards of 2026.

== Discography ==
=== Albums ===
Year	Details	Peak chart positions					Certifications (sales threshold)
Year	Details	CAN	US	US sales	US Heat	US Folk	Certifications (sales threshold)
2009	Pink Strat: Released: July 21, 2009; Label: Brushfire Records; Format: CD, LP, digital download	—	—	—	—	—	
2012	Barchords: Released: February 7, 2012; Label: Brushfire; Format: CD, LP, digital download	—	—	—	14	14	MC: Gold
2014	Bahamas Is Afie: Released: August 19, 2014; Label: Brushfire; Format: CD, LP, digital download	4	—	—	15	6	MC: Gold
2018	Earthtones: Released: January 19, 2018; Label: Brushfire; Format: CD, LP, digital download	5	—	76	3	13	
2020	Sad Hunk: Released: October 9, 2020; Label: Brushfire; Format: CD, LP, digital download	67	—	—	—	—	
2023	Bootcut: Released: September 15, 2023; Label: Brushfire; Format: CD, LP, digital download	—	—	—	—	—	
2025	My Second Last Album: Released: October 24, 2025; Label: Brushfire; Format: CD, LP, digital download	—	—	—	—	—	
"—" denotes releases that did not chart

=== Singles ===
Year	Song	Chart peak			Certifications (sales threshold)	Album
Year	Song	CAN Rock	US AAA	US Rock	Certifications (sales threshold)	Album
2012	"Caught Me Thinking"	48	—	—		Barchords
2012	"Lost in the Light"	—	—	—	MC: 2× Platinum; RIAA: Gold	Barchords
2014	"All the Time"	—	10	19	MC: Platinum; RIAA: Platinum	Bahamas Is Afie
2014	"Stronger Than That"	42	—	—	MC: Gold	Bahamas Is Afie
2017	"No Wrong"	—	—	—		Earthtones
2017	"Way with Words"	—	27	—		Earthtones
2017	"My Love"	—	—	—		The Tribes of Palos Verdes
2018	"Bad Boys Need Love Too"	—	—	—		Earthtones
2018	"No Expectations"	—	—	—		Earthtones
2020	"Own Alone"	—	26	—		Sad Hunk
2020	"Trick to Happy"	—	39	—		Sad Hunk
2023	"I'm Still"	—	35	—		Bootcut
2025	"Please Don't Return"	—	—	—		Songs from the Gang
"—" denotes a release that did not chart.

== Personal life ==
Jurvanen lived in The Junction neighborhood of Toronto with his wife and two children until December 2018, when they relocated to Nova Scotia.

== Awards and nominations ==
Year	Association	Category	Nominated work	Result	Ref
2024	Canadian Country Music Association	Alternative Country Album of the Year	Bootcut	Nominated	
