= How to Fall Down in Public =

Studio album by Howie Beck
- Released: February 24, 2009
- Genre: Indie rock
- Length: 30:18
- Label: 13 Clouds

Howie Beck chronology
Howie Beck (2004)	How to Fall Down in Public (2009)

How to Fall Down in Public is the fourth studio album by Canadian singer-songwriter Howie Beck, released February 24, 2009. The album was a nominee for Adult Alternative Album of the Year at the 2010 Juno Awards.

== Track listing ==
(All tracks written by Howie Beck)

1. "Watch out for the Fuzz" - 3:10
2. "Flashover" - 4:38
3. "Save Me" - 5:00
4. "Don't Put Your Arms Around Me No More" - 3:46
5. "Fin" - 2:16
6. "Over and Under" - 2:25
7. "La La" - 3:25
8. "If I Ever Come Home" - 3:30
9. "Beside This Life" - 2:08
