= Good Grief (film) =

2023 film by Dan Levy

- Release poster
- Directed by: Daniel Levy
- Written by: Daniel Levy
- Produced by: Daniel Levy; Megan Zehmer; Debra Hayward; Kate Fenske
- Starring: Daniel Levy; Ruth Negga; Himesh Patel; Celia Imrie; David Bradley; Arnaud Valois; Luke Evans
- Cinematography: Ole Bratt Birkeland
- Edited by: Jonathan Corn
- Music by: Rob Simonsen
- Production companies: Not A Real Production Company; Sister
- Distributed by: Netflix
- Release date: December 29, 2023 (United States)
- Running time: 100 minutes
- Country: United States
- Language: English

Good Grief is a 2023 American comedy-drama film written and directed by Dan Levy in his directorial film debut. The film stars Levy, Ruth Negga, Himesh Patel, Celia Imrie, David Bradley, Arnaud Valois, and Luke Evans. Its plot follows a man mourning the loss of his husband as his two best friends help him on his journey of grief and acceptance.

Good Grief received a limited theatrical release in the United States on December 29, 2023, as well as limited release at Toronto International Film Festival on the same day before its streaming debut by Netflix on January 5, 2024.

== Plot ==
In London, Marc enjoys a Christmas party with friends and Oliver, his husband of many years. Oliver leaves the party early to travel for a book signing in Paris and dies in a car crash just seconds after.

In the following year, Marc's best friends Sophie and Thomas try to help him through his grief. However, Marc opens a note from Oliver confessing he had met someone else. Then he discovers his husband had also been secretly leasing an apartment in Paris.

Marc brings Sophie and Thomas with him to the city, though he keeps the revelation a secret so the three can have a good time. Sophie, who had recently ended a serious relationship with her boyfriend Terrance, brings them to meet a date, which Marc leaves to spend time with Theo, a French man he had previously met at a London performance art exhibit.

Marc admits that his anger at Oliver's secrets is distracting him from his grief. He also reveals that he gave up painting following the death of his mother, and he worries that he's not properly grieving Oliver just as he didn't properly grieve her. Theo brings Marc to the Claude Monet room at the Musée de l'Orangerie, explaining that it had been painted after the death of his family, and they kiss.

The next morning, Thomas berates the two for their abandonment, explaining that Sophie had been found sleeping at a bus station and he could not reach Marc. A man enters and introduces himself as Luca, a Berlin native who had won Oliver's art scholarship before growing closer to him, finally leading to Marc telling the truth about the nature of their trip.

At dinner, Sophie apologizes to the others and asks that they are honest about their feelings for once. The friends ride the Roue de Paris where Sophie admits that she has commitment issues and Thomas admits his fear of never being "the one" for his boyfriends. Sophie and Thomas depart for London, Luca apologizes to Marc and tells him that Oliver had no intention of leaving him, and Marc sees Theo one last time.

After Marc returns to London, he decides to sell the house he'd shared with Oliver and takes up painting again. The next Christmas, Sophie is engaged to Terrance and Thomas introduces his new boyfriend to Marc. Marc's portraits, including ones of himself, Sophie, Thomas, Oliver, and Theo, are featured in a gallery as Marc is finally in a place of acceptance.

== Cast ==
- Daniel Levy as Marc
- Ruth Negga as Sophie
- Himesh Patel as Thomas
- Luke Evans as Oliver
- Celia Imrie as Imelda
- Arnaud Valois as Theo
- Mehdi Baki as Luca
- David Bradley as Duncan
- Emma Corrin as young performance artist
- Jamael Westman as Terrance
- Kaitlyn Dever as Lily Kayne

== Production ==
In September 2021, Daniel Levy was announced to be writing and directing a romantic comedy film for Netflix, in which he would also star as part of a film and television deal he signed with the company. Levy described the film in a June 2022 interview as being more a "love story about friendship". In 2022, Levy invited Toronto-based artist Kris Knight to create shadow paintings for Levy's character Marc. In October 2022, additional casting including Ruth Negga, Himesh Patel and Luke Evans was announced.

Filming took place in November 2022 in London, then moved to Paris, before wrapping in mid-December.

The portraits featured in the film's ending were painted by artist Kris Knight.

== Release ==
Good Grief was released in limited theaters on December 29, 2023, followed by a streaming release by Netflix on January 5, 2024.

== Reception ==
On the review aggregator website Rotten Tomatoes, 76% of 37 critics' reviews are positive, with an average rating of 5.6/10. The website's consensus reads: "A solid first feature for writer-director Dan Levy, Good Grief offers a generally affecting look at love after death whose refreshing sincerity only occasionally veers into sentimentality." Metacritic, which uses a weighted average, assigned the film a score of 59 out of 100, based on 19 critics, indicating "mixed or average" reviews.

Peter Debruge from Variety gave a positive review writing: "Levy has crafted an emotional story strong enough to withstand the zings of an ironic generation, who’ve been conditioned to snipe at sincerity. It takes guts to put genuine feelings on the line, especially after giving sarcastic-minded viewers so much ammunition". David Rooney writing for The Hollywood Reporter said: "The shimmering melancholy of Rob Simonsen's score is often left to suggest a depth of feeling that's missing in the writing and, by extension, the performances. The script is sensitive but never terribly probing, and the movie's intimacy more staged than lived-in".

Brian Tallerico, at RogerEbert.com, gave the film a score of two out of four: "Levy has a strong on-screen presence—he's a remarkably natural, likable performer—but he struggles a bit to find his voice as a writer and director with Good Grief, a modest study of the impact of loss that pushes a few buttons harder than it should and fails to fill out its ensemble equally". Tim Robey from The Daily Telegraph rated the film three out of five.
