= Barchords =

Studio album by Bahamas
- Released: February 7, 2012
- Genres: Folk, indie
- Label: Brushfire
- Producer: Robbie Lackritz

Bahamas chronology
Pink Strat (2009)	Barchords (2012)	Bahamas Is Afie (2014)

Barchords is the second album from Canadian musician Bahamas.

The album was nominated for Adult Alternative Album of the Year at the Juno Awards of 2013.

== Track listing ==
All songs written by Afie Jurvanen.

No.	Title	Length
1.	"Lost in the Light"	3:56
2.	"Caught Me Thinkin'"	3:00
3.	"Montreal"	2:41
4.	"Okay Alright I'm Alive"	2:58
5.	"Never Again"	4:30
6.	"Overjoyed"	4:26
7.	"I Got You Babe"	2:46
8.	"Any Other Way"	1:03
9.	"Snow Plow (featuring Feist)"	3:01
10.	"Your Sweet Touch"	3:52
11.	"Time and Time Again"	3:12
12.	"Be My Witness"	3:46
13.	"Where You Go (Bonus Version)"	2:21
