= Begonia (musician) =

Canadian pop singer-songwriter

Alexa Dirks, also known by her stage name Begonia, is a Canadian pop singer and songwriter. She is most noted for her 2019 album Fear, which was longlisted for the 2020 Polaris Music Prize and shortlisted for the Juno Award for Adult Alternative Album of the Year at the Juno Awards of 2021.

== Career ==
Dirks was a member of the Juno Award winning band Chic Gamine. She launched her solo career in 2017 with the EP Lady in Mind. The EP's single "Juniper" reached #1 on the Radio 2 Top 20. Her single "Hanging on a Line" was released in June 2019 as a preview of Fear. She undertook a Canadian tour over the summer, before releasing Fear in September.

Begonia's album Powder Blue was shortlisted for the 2023 Polaris Music Prize. It received a Juno Award nomination for Adult Alternative Album of the Year at the Juno Awards of 2024.

Fantasy Life was co-winner, with Bahamas's My Second Last Album, of the Juno award for Adult Alternative Album of the Year at the Juno Awards of 2026. It was subsequently shortlisted for the 2026 Polaris Music Prize, and the song "My Fantasy Life" was longlisted for the SOCAN Polaris Song Prize.
