= Bahamas Is Afie =

Studio album by Bahamas
- Released: August 19, 2014
- Genres: Folk, indie
- Label: Brushfire
- Producer: Afie Jurvanen

Bahamas chronology
Barchords (2012)	Bahamas Is Afie (2014)	Earthtones (2018)

Bahamas Is Afie is the third album from Canadian musician Bahamas, released August 19, 2014 on Brushfire Records.

The album features guest contributions by Don Kerr, Jason Tait and Felicity Williams.

The album won the Juno Award for Adult Alternative Album of the Year at the Juno Awards of 2015, and Afie Jurvanen won Songwriter of the Year for "All the Time", "Bitter Memories" and "Stronger Than That". CBC Radio One's arts and culture magazine show Q also named the album as the best album of 2014.

The album was a longlisted nominee for the 2015 Polaris Music Prize.

== Track listing ==
All tracks are written by Afie Jurvanen.

No.	Title	Length
1.	"Waves"	4:22
2.	"Can't Take You With Me"	3:10
3.	"Bitter Memories"	2:28
4.	"All the Time"	3:54
5.	"Stronger Than That"	2:37
6.	"Half Mine"	2:16
7.	"All Time Favourite"	4:09
8.	"Like a Wind"	3:27
9.	"Nothing to Me Now"	3:19
10.	"Little Record Girl"	3:02
11.	"I Had It All"	3:41
12.	"All I've Ever Known"	6:15
Total length:		42:40
