= Kris Knight =

Canadian artist

- Born: 1980 (age 45–46); Windsor, Ontario, Canada
- Education: Ontario College of Art and Design
- Known for: Painter
- Website: krisknight.com

Kris Knight (born 1980), is a Canadian artist based in Toronto, Ontario, Canada. Knight's works are mostly portraits; Knight wanted to draw the human face as a child and it continues to be the main thing that he focuses on painting as an adult. Each one of Knight's series of work stems from his autobiographical memory. He works at a downtown Toronto studio that he shares with illustrator Winnie Truong.

== Life and career ==
Knight was born in Windsor, Ontario in 1980, and moved to Toronto in 1999 for art school. Knight has three other siblings. Growing up in a bakery, where his mother worked as a baker, Knight's pastel palette was influenced by his experiences tinting icing used for baked goods. Knight mixed his color palette by using the technique bakers use to make cake icings - by starting off with a white base and later adding the tint. Knight has described himself as having an awkward and shy personality. Knight's parents gave art supplies as Knight's birthday and Christmas present since he was young, seeing that he had an interest in art. Knight received his degree in 2003, majoring in Painting and Drawing from the Ontario College of Art and Design (AOCAD), with a minor in Curating and Criticism. In most of Knight's twenties, he worked in art galleries during the day and restaurants at night.

Knight's works are represented by Spinello Gallery in Miami and Galerie Alain Gutharc in Paris. He was represented by Toronto art dealer Katharine Mulherin (1964–2019)} until her death in 2019.

== Works ==
18th century styles painting like Romanticism, Symbolism, Sturm und Drang, and Rococo have influenced Knight's work. Drawn to the ghostly look of French 17th century portraiture(Baroque) because of the 'heavy white powder make-up that was in vogue at the time', Knight cited the pastels used in the work of Joseph Ducreux and Louise Élisabeth Vigée Le Brun as an influence. Knight often mute the skin tones of his palette so that the characters of his paintings appear powdered and slightly translucent. Obsessed with the French Revolution since he was young, having always been inspired by folklore, myth, secrets, gossip, fashion and historical costumes. The works of Thomas Lawrence, John Singer Sargent, Nicolas Poussin, Jean-Honoré Fragonard, and Thomas Gainsborough has influenced Kris Knight as well.

The majority of Knight's characters are based on real people, mostly his close friends and family, but sometimes collaged images culled from mass media, self-portraits, and his imagination. Knight's subjects have mostly been young men or androgynous men, admitting that he has a fascination with "youth decay" - of holding on to one's youth: "Our society focuses so much on youth as the pinnacle of beauty that we become poisoned by the obsession of preserving what is naturally fleeting." Knight attributed his love of giving a "cheesy subversive title" to his paintings to growing up gay in "unromantic, small farming towns in rural Canada". He also compared the titles of his paintings to "someone making a bad joke to cheer [the viewer] up" because he found most of his paintings have a sad atmosphere.

=== The Lost and Found (2012) ===
In paintings like Mischief, Caught and My Porcelain Life, characters in the portraits are wearing masks. Knight stated that the group of paintings are about "a group of disenchanted youths who subtly play with roles of being the hunter and the hunted. As much as the characters in these paintings try to be lost, they are very much aware of who is watching them." Knight said that the characters are often wearing elements of protection—sweaters, furs, masks—that are "too delicate to protect or hide anything", Knight wanted his characters to be "as guarded as they are vulnerable". He examined the emotional state of what it is like to feel lost and how the characters return to where they were. The series was Knight's response to feeling "a bit burnt out" from deadlines.

=== Secrets Are Things We Grow (2013) ===
Knight said that "within these portraits are elements of the garden and exercises in pattern work representing how secrets are rooted and grow with time. Other paintings note the bonds formed when secrets are revealed to those we hold closest." Knight elaborates, "Within these portraits are elements of the garden and exercises in pattern work representing how secrets are rooted and grow with time. Other paintings note the bonds formed when secrets are revealed to those we hold closest."

=== Smell The Magic (2014) ===
The exhibition was first exhibited at Gucci's Art Basel event at Spinello Project's pop-up gallery in Wynwood, Florida, sponsored by the Italian fashion house Gucci. Because of the exhibit location in Miami, Knight was inspired to use brighter colors in this body of work, saying that some of his new paintings are deliberately tropical but in an awkward "northerner's first day in the tropics" kind of way. Some figures of the paintings have Ouija board pointers for eyes, others have blossoms painted on their faces.

== Collaborations in fashion ==
Knight's art was celebrated by the fashion industry early on his career. In 2012 his paintings graced four covers of Milan Yukmirovic's FASHION FOR MEN bookmagazine, noted as the "bible for men's fashion". In January 2014, a friend notified Knight that his painting's pastel color palette was listed as a color inspiration for Gucci's men's ready-to-wear fall/winter 2014 collection. The collaboration began a month late after the event, with Knight being invited to Rome to meet Gucci's creative director Frida Giannini, a fan of Knight's works, and her team to rework Gucci's iconic Flora print. The original floral print, commissioned by Rodolfo Gucci to Vittorio Accornero in 1966, was applied on a silk scarf as a gift to Princess Grace of Monaco on her trip to the brand's store in Via Monte Napoleone with her husband Prince Rainier.

In Knight's reimagining of Gucci's Flora design, Knight referenced ancient pagan Rome; he illustrated plants that women used for healing (poppy, henbane, mandrake); seduction (belladonna, datura); and protection (clover, dandelion, and nightshade), he envisioned for a design that is 'strong, feminine, magical and quietly dangerous'. Knight picked botanicals that either blossomed at night, dawn or dusk but also chose plants that have strong roots for adaptability, persistence and resistance in harsh environments. Knight also cited singer Marianne Faithfull as a muse for the project after spotting a photo of the singer on Gucci's mood board. The resulted work was applied to a variety of Giannini's design for Gucci's Cruise 2015 season. Giannini played the song Blue Neck Rivierathe from the Montreal band No Joy album, one of the thank-you gifts Knight gave her, for one of her runway shows. Vogue Editor-in-Chief Anna Wintour was photographed wearing Knight's floral motif on a dress from the Gucci Cruise 2015 collection.

Knight's work was hand-picked by fashion designer Christian Lacroix to be part of a group exhibition, Carte Blanche a Christian Lacroix, at Musée Cognacq-Jay in Paris in November 2014. His work was featured alongside other contemporary artists who are inspired by the 18th century.

== Other collaborations ==
In 2019, Penguin Books published Stilla Tillyard's George IV in its Penguin Monarchs series, with a portrait of the king by Knight on the cover.

In 2020 Knight was commissioned to paint Canadian folk musician Basia Bulat for the cover of her fifth studio album Are You In Love?

In 2020 Knight was nominated for a Juno Award for Album Artwork of the Year for art direction and design for Ensign Broderick.

In 2020 Knight's 2014 painting Wicked Shade was published as the German cover of Danish author Jonas Eika's novel Nach der Sonne (Efter Solen) which was awarded the Nordic Council Literature Prize in 2019.

In 2022, Dan Levy invited Knight to provide shadow paintings for Levy's character in his debut film Good Grief. The film debuted in theaters in late December 2023 and on Netflix in early 2024. Knight estimates that he painted about 15-17 portraits for the film, which are showcased most prominently in one the film's finale scene featuring a gallery exhibit. A portrait gallery of Knight's paintings featured in the film is featured on Netflix's Tudum site.
