= Earthtones (Bahamas album) =

Studio album by Bahamas
- Released: January 19, 2018
- Length: 45:05
- Label: Brushfire
- Producer: Afie Jurvanen

Bahamas chronology
Bahamas Is Afie (2014)	Earthtones (2018)	Sad Hunk (2020)

Singles from Earthtones
- 1. "No Wrong" Released: October 26, 2017; 2. "Way with Words" Released: December 5, 2017; 3. "Bad Boys Need Love Too" Released: January 10, 2018; 4. "No Expectations" Released: May 14, 2018

Earthtones is the fourth studio album by Canadian musician Bahamas, and was released on January 19, 2018.

== Release ==
The album was released on January 19, 2018 on CD, vinyl, and digital download.

== Singles ==
The lead single of the album was "No Wrong", which was released on October 26, 2017. A music video from the song was released on YouTube on November 12, 2017. The second single, "Way with Words", was released on December 5, 2017, along with a music video to accompany it. "Bad Boys Need Love Too" was released as the third single from the album on January 10, 2018. "No Expectations" was released as the fourth single on May 14, 2018.

== Promotion ==
Bahamas performed as the opening act for Jack Johnson during his All the Light Above it Too World Tour in 2017. Then on October 26, 2017, he announced his own Earthtones World Tour along with the release of "No Wrong". The tour began on January 17, 2018 in Montreal and concluded on May 20, 2018 at the Hangout Festival in Gulf Shores, Alabama.

== Reception ==
The album received a nomination for the 2019 Grammy Awards, for Best Engineered Album, Non-Classical.

At the Juno Awards of 2019, the album won the Juno Award for Adult Alternative Album of the Year, and Ali Eisner's video for the song "No Depression" won the Juno Award for Video of the Year.

== Track listing ==
No.	Title	Length
1.	"Alone"	3:24
2.	"Opening Act (The Shooby Dooby Bop Bop Song)"	3:51
3.	"No Wrong"	3:49
4.	"Show Me Naomi"	3:50
5.	"No Expectations"	3:30
6.	"Way with Words"	4:20
7.	"Bad Boys Need Love Too"	3:41
8.	"Everything to Everyone"	4:28
9.	"So Free"	7:05
10.	"No Depression"	3:06
11.	"Any Place"	4:01
Total length:		45:05

== Charts ==
Chart (2018)	Peak position
US Folk Albums (Billboard)	13
Canadian Albums (Billboard)	5
