= Good Advice (album) =

Studio album by Basia Bulat
- Released: February 12, 2016
- Genres: Indie pop Folk
- Length: 35:57
- Label: Secret City
- Producer: Jim James

Basia Bulat chronology
Tall Tall Shadow (2013)	Good Advice (2016)	Are You in Love? (2020)

Professional ratings
Aggregate scores
Source	Rating
Metacritic	73/100
Review scores
Source	Rating
AllMusic	3.5/5 stars
Exclaim!	7/10
The Guardian	4/5 stars
MusicOMH	4/5 stars
The Observer	4/5 stars
Paste	7.8/10
PopMatters	7/10 stars
The Skinny	4/5 stars

Good Advice is the fourth studio album by Canadian recording artist Basia Bulat, released on February 12, 2016 by Secret City Records. The album was produced by Jim James.

== Critical reception ==
Good Advice was met with "generally favorable" reviews from critics. At Metacritic, which assigns a weighted average rating out of 100 to reviews from mainstream publications, this release received an average score of 73, based on 15 reviews.

== Track listing ==
All tracks are written by Basia Bulat.

No.	Title	Length
1.	"La La Lie"	3:45
2.	"Long Goodbye"	3:46
3.	"Let Me in"	2:45
4.	"In the Name of"	4:15
5.	"Time"	3:05
6.	"Good Advice"	4:16
7.	"Infamous"	3:42
8.	"Fool"	2:43
9.	"The Garden"	3:17
10.	"Someday Soon"	4:23

== Charts ==
Chart (2016)	Peak position
Canadian Albums (Billboard)	23
UK Independent Albums (Official Charts)	36
