= Ignorance (The Weather Station album) =

Studio album by the Weather Station
- Released: February 5, 2021
- Recorded: 2019
- Studio: Canterbury (Toronto)
- Genres: Indie rock, baroque pop, folk-pop
- Length: 40:42
- Labels: Fat Possum; Next Door
- Producers: Tamara Lindeman; Marcus Paquin

The Weather Station chronology
The Weather Station (2017)	Ignorance (2021)	How Is It That I Should Look at the Stars (2022)

Singles from Ignorance
- 1. "Robber" Released: October 14, 2020; 2. "Tried to Tell You" Released: November 18, 2020

Ignorance is the fifth studio album by Canadian band the Weather Station. It was released worldwide on February 5, 2021, through Fat Possum Records in the United States, and a small part (digital or vinyl only) through Next Door Records in Canada. The album's lead single "Robber" was released on October 14, 2020.

The album's ten tracks were recorded with two percussionists, a saxophonist and a flutist, plus bass, keys, and guitar. Songwriter Tamara Lindeman wrote and produced all the songs. The album's theme is based on Lindeman's contemplation of the global climate crisis.

== Critical reception ==
Professional ratings
Aggregate scores
Source	Rating
AnyDecentMusic?	8.6/10
Metacritic	89/100
Review scores
Source	Rating
AllMusic	4.5/5 stars
Financial Times	5/5 stars
Mojo	4/5 stars
NME	4/5 stars
The Observer	5/5 stars
Pitchfork	9.0/10
Record Collector	5/5 stars
Rolling Stone	4/5 stars
The Times	4/5 stars
Uncut	9/10

Ignorance was widely acclaimed by music critics. Lindsay Zoladz of The New York Times called it a "piercing new album" and applauded Lindeman's lyrics about climate change.

The album was shortlisted for the 2021 Polaris Music Prize.

=== Accolades ===
Ignorance on year-end lists
Publication	List	Rank	Ref.
CBC Music	The 21 best Canadian albums of 2021	10	
Exclaim!	Best Albums of 2021	2	
The Guardian	The 50 Best Albums of 2021	4	
The New York Times	Best Albums of 2021	4	
The New Yorker	The Best Music of 2021	1	
Paste	The 50 Best Albums of 2021	3	
Pitchfork	The 50 Best Albums of 2021	7	
Rolling Stone	The 50 Best Albums of 2021	27	
Stereogum	The 50 Best Albums of 2021	8	
Uncut	Uncut's Top 75 Albums of 2021	1	

== Track listing ==
All tracks are written by Tamara Lindeman.

No.	Title	Length
1.	"Robber"	5:20
2.	"Atlantic"	3:53
3.	"Tried to Tell You"	3:38
4.	"Parking Lot"	4:06
5.	"Loss"	3:36
6.	"Separated"	3:24
7.	"Wear"	3:18
8.	"Trust"	5:00
9.	"Heart"	3:47
10.	"Subdivisions"	4:40
Total length:		40:42

== Personnel ==
Credits adapted from Bandcamp:

Musicians

- Tamara Lindeman – vocals, piano, guitar, Moog, Pianet, Wurlitzer, string arrangements (tracks 1, 3, 4, 6, 7)
- Kieran Adams – drums, percussion
- Christine Bougie – guitar
- Ryan Driver – flute
- Drew Jurecka – violin, clarinet, bass clarinet
- Ian Kehoe – percussion
- Shannon Knights – viola
- Philippe Melanson – percussion
- Lydia Munchinsky – cello
- Owen Pallett – string arrangements (tracks 7, 8)
- Marcus Paquin – percussion
- Mike Smith – music notation
- Johnny Spence – piano, organ, Wurlitzer, Moog, Juno
- Brodie West – saxophone
- Ben Whiteley – bass, guitar
- Felicity Williams – harmony vocals (tracks 3, 9)
- Rebekah Wolkstein – violin

Engineers

- Tamara Lindeman – production, overdubbing
- Marcus Paquin – production, overdubbing, mixing
- Jeremy Darby – engineering
- Julian Decorte – engineering
- Joao Carvalho – final mastering

Design

- Hugo Bernier – design
- Jeff Bierk – photography

== Charts ==
Chart performance for Ignorance
Chart (2021)	Peak position
Belgian Albums (Ultratop Flanders)	136
Scottish Albums (Official Charts)	22
UK Albums (Official Charts)	61
UK Independent Albums (Official Charts)	5
