= Howie Beck =

- Born: Howard Jay Beck; Toronto, Ontario, Canada
- Origin: Toronto, Ontario, Canada
- Occupations: songwriter, performer, multi-instrumentalist, producer, arranger, mixer
- Website: www.howiebeck.com

Howie Beck is a Canadian musician, mixer and producer based in Toronto, Ontario. He has been nominated for three Juno Awards in Canada on three occasions for Adult Alternative Album, Engineer of the Year and Producer of the Year (2017).

== History ==
Beck's debut album, 1997's Pop and Crash, was recorded at home while Beck recovered from mononucleosis.

Beck performed at the 1999 Stardust Picnic festival at Historic Fort York, Toronto, as well as at the Rancho Relaxo that year. He began to attract attention outside of Canada with 1999's Hollow. Around this time, some of Beck's songs made appearances in prime-time TV shows like Buffy the Vampire Slayer, Queer as Folk, and Felicity. Picked up by the independent record label Easy!Tiger, Hollow was released in Europe nearly two years after its Canadian release to rave reviews, and regular international tours followed. His music has also appeared in episodes of One Tree Hill and Degrassi.

Beck regularly trades guest appearances, in recording sessions and onstage, with other Canadian artists such as Sarah Harmer, Hayden, Leslie Feist, Jason Collett, Chilly Gonzales and British singer-songwriter Ed Harcourt. Beck is also an accomplished drummer and has appeared as a multi-instrumentalist on many albums by Hayden, Sarah Harmer, Gonzales and others.

After a long break from the music industry, partly triggered by September 11, Beck finally released his third, self-titled album in Canada in 2004. The album was again released in 2006 in the UK, Europe and the US to generally positive reviews. That year he toured with Josh Rouse and Nada Surf in Europe and Scandinavia.

How to Fall Down in Public, his fourth full-length album, was released to critical acclaim in Canada on February 24, 2009, receiving glowing reviews and features in the Canadian press. Beck continues to have mainly a devoted cult following, largely due to his irregular live appearances. Though he again played all of the instruments on the album, he was assisted by Gonzales in some instrumental and production duties. Also appearing on the album are Feist and Sarah Harmer, both as guest vocalists.

In recent years, Beck is more known as a producer and mixer. He has produced and / or mixed albums for Jason Collett, Hayden, Feist, Hannah Georgas, Walk Off the Earth, Barenaked Ladies, Jamie Lidell, Chilly Gonzales, Ron Sexsmith, Dragonette, Charlotte Day Wilson, Sarah Harmer, Rich Aucoin Daniela Andrade, Elisapie and Something For Kate among others.

In 2010, Beck's album How to Fall Down in Public was a Juno Award nominee for Adult Alternative Album of the Year. In 2014, he was nominated for his work engineering Hannah Georgas and Walk Off The Earth, and additionally in 2017, he received a Juno nomination for Producer of the Year for his work on Wilson's "Work" and Dragonette's "High Five".

== Discography ==
- Pop and Crash, 1997
- Hollow, 2001
- Maybe I Belong (EP), 2001
- The Chance is Gone (EP), 2001
- Howie Beck, 2004
- How to Fall Down in Public, 2009
