= Way with Words (Bahamas song) =

Single by Bahamas

from the album Earthtones
- Released: December 1, 2017
- Genre: Indie pop
- Length: 4:29
- Label: Brushfire

Bahamas singles chronology
| "No Wrong" (2017) | "Way with Words" (2017) | "My Love" (2017) |

"Way with Words" is a song by Canadian musician Bahamas. The song is featured as the second single from his 2018 album Earthtones, and was released on December 1, 2017.

== Release ==
The song was released on December 1, 2017.

== Music video ==
A music video for the song was released on Bahamas's YouTube on December 1, 2017.

== Charts ==
| Chart (2018) | Peak position |
|---|---|
| US Adult Alternative Songs (Billboard) | 27 |
