= Basia Bulat =

Canadian folk singer-songwriter

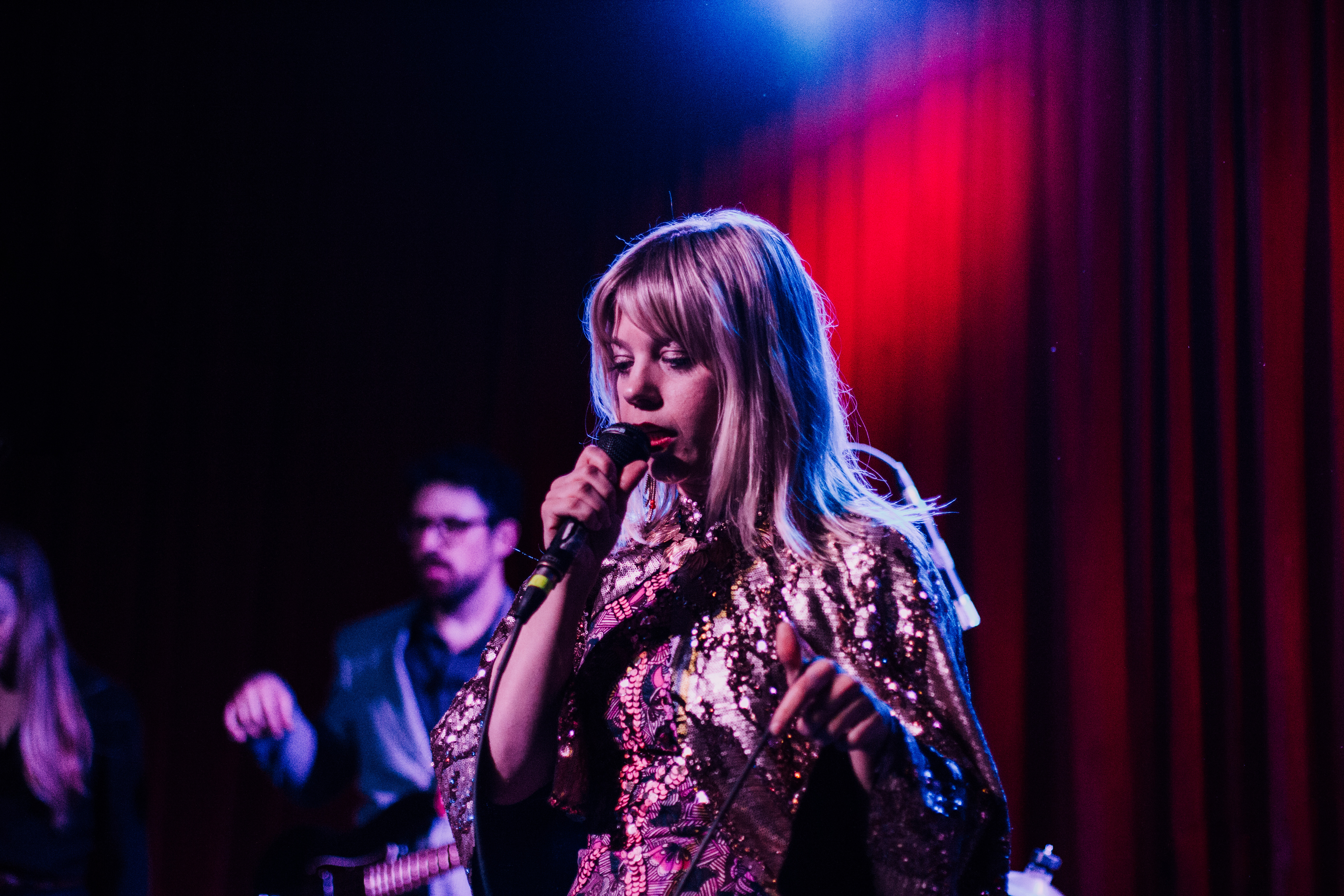
- Bulat performing in 2016

Background information
- Born: Barbara Josephine Bulat; April 13, 1984 (age 42); Toronto, Ontario, Canada
- Origin: London, Ontario, Canada
- Genre: Folk
- Occupation: Singer-songwriter
- Instruments: Vocals, guitar, autoharp, hammered dulcimer, piano, ukulele, charango
- Years active: 2004–present
- Labels: Rough Trade, Hardwood, Secret City
- Website: basiabulat.com

Barbara Josephine Bulat (born April 13, 1984), known professionally as Basia Bulat (/ˈbɒʃə buːˈlɒt/), is a Canadian folk singer-songwriter. She is known for performing with an autoharp.

== Early life and education ==
Bulat grew up in Etobicoke, Ontario, where her mother was a music teacher who taught piano and guitar. She is of Polish origin and a member of the Canadian Polonia. She has said the radio at home was permanently tuned to an oldies station. "I don't think I realised the radio had more than one station until I was 11 or 12," she says.

She attended the University of Western Ontario in the city of London, Ontario where she received a degree in English; she also took some classes with Olenka Krakus of the band Olenka and the Autumn Lovers. Bulat began an MA in English at Western in 2006 but moved to Montreal to record "an audible memory" of her time there which resulted in her debut album.

Although Bulat no longer lives in London, Ontario, she has recognized the importance of London in establishing her career: "London has always been so supportive of me. I feel like the city really adopted me," she says. "It wasn't part of a larger commercial music industry but a small, close-knit scene, which was kind of nice."

== Career ==
While a student at the University of Western Ontario, Bulat had a radio program on Western's community and campus radio station CHRW-FM titled "Happy Tuesday" with co-host Holly Coish. Bulat first appeared on stage after she was coaxed by friends into opening for Julie Doiron and soon gained a local following.

=== Oh, My Darling (2007) ===
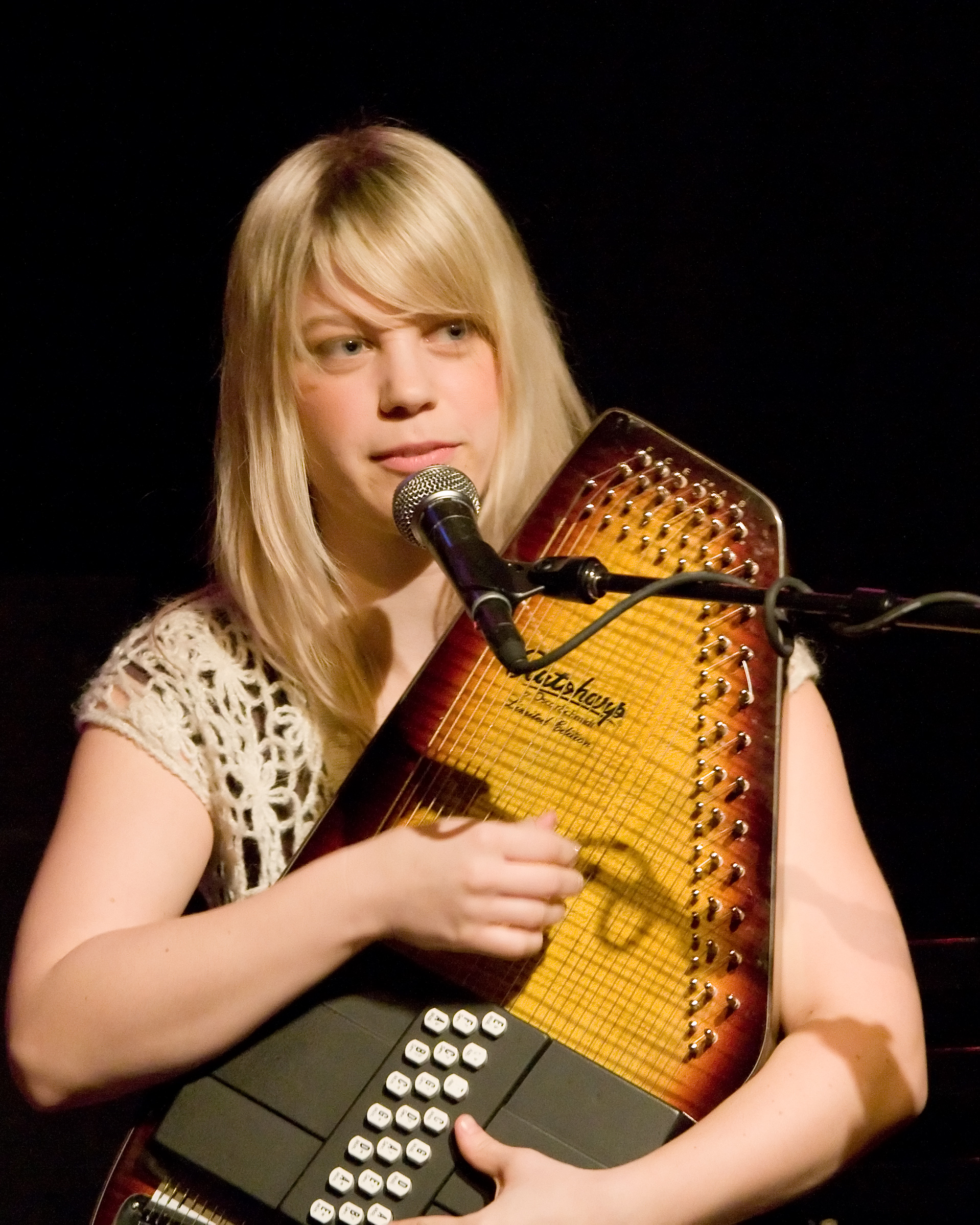
Bulat performing with her autoharp in 2008

Bulat released an independent EP in 2005 and was subsequently signed to Rough Trade Records, which released her full-length debut album, Oh, My Darling in April 2007, produced by Howard Bilerman. The album was later released in Canada by Hayden's Hardwood Records.

Her singles "Snakes and Ladders", "Little One" and "I Was a Daughter" have been playlisted on CBC Radio 3 while various tracks have received airplay on college radio in Canada and the United States. Her album Oh, My Darling made the shortlist for the 2008 Polaris Music Prize.

Bulat has toured across Canada, the US and Europe; in June 2008, she ventured to Australia. She played the 2008 Dawson City Music Festival in the Yukon. Bulat cited the week she spent in the quiet and remote location as an inspiration for her songwriting.

=== Heart of My Own (2010) ===
Her second album, Heart of My Own, also produced by Howard Bilerman, was released by Rough Trade Records in the US and in Canada via Secret City Records on January 26, 2010. It peaked at number 13 on the Billboard charts on February 13, 2010.

Bulat appeared on Hockey Night in Canada on December 10, 2011, during which she sang the Canadian national anthem at an Ottawa Senators game at Scotiabank Place (now the Canadian Tire Centre).

=== Tall Tall Shadow (2013) ===
On September 30, 2013, Bulat released her third album Tall Tall Shadow worldwide via Secret City Records. It was produced by Tim Kingsbury and Mark Lawson. The album was nominated for a 2014 Juno Award in the Adult Alternative Album of the Year category, and was a shortlisted nominee for the 2014 Polaris Music Prize. The album has been well received in Canada and the United States. It peaked at number 25 on the Billboard charts on October 19, 2013.

The song "Tall Tall Shadow" was featured in the opening video montage on Hockey Night in Canada prior to the games between the Chicago Blackhawks and Toronto Maple Leafs, and the Montreal Canadiens and New York Islanders on December 14, 2013.

=== Good Advice (2016) ===
Her fourth album, Good Advice, was produced by My Morning Jacket frontman Jim James and was released on February 12, 2016. It became a shortlisted nominee for the 2016 Polaris Music Prize. The title of the album refers to female friends whom she relied on during a recent breakup. It peaked at number 22 on the Billboard charts on March 5, 2016.

=== Basia's Palace (2025) ===
Bulat's fifth album, which she released on February 21, 2025, was longlisted for the 2025 Polaris Music Prize.

== Discography ==
=== Studio albums ===
- Oh, My Darling (2007)
- Heart of My Own (2010)
- Tall Tall Shadow (2013)
- Good Advice (2016)
- Are You in Love? (2020)
- The Garden (2022)
- Basia's Palace (2025)

=== EPs ===
- Basia Bulat (2005)

=== Singles ===
- "Touch the Hem of His Garment" (2008, 7")
- "Your Girl" (2019)
- "You Are a Gift" (2026)

=== Compilations ===
- Friends in Bellwoods II (2009): "My Heart Is a Warning"
- Ho! Ho! Ho! Canada Deux (2010): "You Are a Gift"

== In popular culture ==
- The song "Little Waltz" was used in a 2007 Australian Volkswagen Eos advertisement.
- The song "In the Night" was used on AMC's Every Night at 8 promotion for February 2008.
- The song "Before I Knew" was used in a commercial for the 2010 Subaru Outback.
- The song "Tall Tall Shadow" was used in the 2020 launch trailer for the Nintendo Switch version of the video game The Long Dark.
