= Karen Ng (musician) =

Canadian musician

- Born: Toronto, Ontario, Canada
- Instruments: Saxophone, clarinet
- Website: missngmusic.tumblr.com

Karen Ng is a Canadian improvisational musician, teacher and event organizer based in Toronto, Ontario. Best known as a saxophonist, she is a multi-instrumentalist who has performed internationally with acts including Andy Shauf, Do Make Say Think, and L CON. A former programmer and board member of Somewhere There, she is the co-founder of TONE Festival and joined the Guelph Jazz Festival in 2018 as the Assistant Artistic and General Director.

== Early life and education ==
Ng was born in Toronto, Ontario, and spent her childhood in Hong Kong. She began playing the guitar in Grade 6 and eventually learned to play the piano, flute, clarinet, and saxophone. Predominantly self-taught, Ng holds a BFA from York University. In addition to taken courses Humber College, she has studied privately with Sundar Viswanathan, Mike Murley, Kelly Jefferson, Don Palmer, and Pat Labarbara, and has been awarded numerous professional development grants. In 2015, Ng received a Chalmers Professional Development Grant from the Ontario Arts Council, which allowed her to study with ICP Orchestra saxophonists in Amsterdam and Berlin. The same year she was Jazz.FM91's artist of the week. Ng was awarded a second grant by the Ontario Arts Council as part of the 2018 National and International Residency Projects program.

== Career ==
A frequent performer and collaborator, Ng has performed, recorded and toured with a number of popular music acts like The Weather Station, Bry Webb, Del Bel, Broken Social Scene, Do Make Say Think, The Happiness Project, and L CON. She spent several months in 2017 on an international tour with Andy Shauf. She has also been a regular contributor to experimental and improvisational ensembles including Convergence, Imaginary Flesh and Woodshed Orchestra, a group led by Dave Clark. In 2018, she performed every third Wednesday of each month at the Tranzac with the Josh Cole Quintet. Her interest in improvisational music is tied to the requirement of listening and adapting to others without too much thought. In a 2017 Musicworks interview with Mary Dickie she explained: "Being hypersensitive to your surroundings, being able to read people, having to learn about expectations from each other—those are skills that you might not necessarily use in a musical sense."

Ng co-founded Toronto's TONE Festival alongside Tad Michalak, Ron Gaskin and Daniel Pencer in 2017. Focused on the experimental, the festival's program is curated to highlight artists known for adventurous and improvisational approaches to music. She previously spent several years programming and serving as board member of wik. Ng joined the Guelph Jazz Festival in 2018 Assistant Artistic and General Director.

In addition to performance and programming work, Ng teaches music privately and at the Regent Park School of Music, a non-profit community initiatives in the Regent Park neighbourhood of Toronto. She formerly worked for several years as a woodwinds instructor the Long & McQuade Music Lesson Centre.

Ng was nominated in 2017, along with Anique Jordan and Amber Williams-King, for the Toronto Art Foundation's Emerging Artist Award. In a nomination profile accompanying the announcement she was recognized as a "a staple in Toronto’s experimental and improvising scene".

== Discography ==
- Here (2018)
