= Adventures in Your Own Backyard =

Studio album by Patrick Watson
- Released: April 16, 2012
- Genres: Chamber pop, folk
- Length: 47:51
- Labels: Secret City; Domino

Patrick Watson chronology
Wooden Arms (2009)	Adventures in Your Own Backyard (2012)	Love Songs for Robots (2015)

Singles from Adventures in Your Own Backyard
- 1. "Into Giants" Released: January 25, 2012; 2. "Lighthouse" Released: June 11, 2012; 3. "Step out for a while" Released: August 20, 2012

Adventures in Your Own Backyard is the fourth studio album by Canadian musician Patrick Watson, released in April 2012. It is the band's follow-up to the Polaris Music Prize-nominated 2009 release Wooden Arms, but by comparison is a musically simpler and more emotional album.

== Recording and production ==
Adventures in Your Own Backyard was recorded almost entirely in a home studio next door to Watson's apartment in the Plateau neighbourhood of Montreal, Quebec. The location was chosen for several reasons: the band wanted to return to the city after several years of touring, they felt that they would produce their best work by avoiding the time constraint and stress of recording in a professional studio, and it also allowed Watson to care for his two young children in between recording sessions. According to drummer Robbie Kuster, the relaxed and informal environment "really let [the band] dig in to the writing and the arranging" of the album. However, the album's title refers to more than just the physical location of where it was recorded; as Watson explains,

"We did record it in our backyard, so there’s that aspect, but to me, backyard means the people you have around in the back of your head, not where you have your barbecues. Everyone has their own definition of what a backyard means, and I also think that after seeing so much while travelling, it was exotic to come home and pay attention to the details of where we live."

Though the band is named after its lead singer, Watson, he maintains that "when people say 'Patrick Watson' I don’t think of me... I think of an entity" and has cited the track "Morning Sheets" as an example of a song whose tune was written by someone else (Kuster and Mishka Stein).

== Release ==
In 2011, the band had already revealed that they planned to release an album sometime in the next year, but the title, track listing, release dates and tour dates were not officially announced until January 25, 2012. The track "Into Giants" was also released for streaming online and later officially made available for purchase as a single on February 21, 2012. In anticipation of the album's release, American music magazine Paste named Patrick Watson one of "10 International Acts to Watch for in 2012".

On March 15, the band played at the South by Southwest (SXSW) music festival in Austin, Texas, where Rolling Stone magazine named them among the 25 "can't-miss acts" of the festival. National Public Radio hosts Bob Boilen and Robin Hilton were in attendance and reacted very favourably to the band's performance; Hilton was moved to tears by what he called a "magical" moment that was his "most profound... of the day", while Boilen called it the best show of the festival and predicted the album would be one of the best of 2012.

The album's launch was supported by three sold-out concerts at the Corona Theatre in Montreal on April 15, 16, and 17. A music video for "Into Giants", directed by Brigitte Henry, was released on April 24, 2012.

=== Web series ===
External videos
- Patrick Watson Adventures on YouTube. The first in the band's web series, this video was filmed in Rouyn-Noranda in September 2011 and released online in April 2012.

To accompany the album, the band will release a series of web videos described by Watson as a collection of "stories in people's backyards". The videos will combine musical performances as well as documentary elements and are inspired by American filmmaker David Lynch's 2009 web series Interview Project. The first video, released on April 16, was shot in Rouyn-Noranda, Quebec during the Emerging Music Festival (French: Festival de musique émergente) in September 2011. It features an interview with a local restaurateur Conrad Morasse as well as a small outdoor concert by the town's train tracks.

=== Release history ===
Country	Date	Label
Continental Europe	April 16, 2012	Domino Recording Company
Canada	April 17, 2012	Secret City Records
Germany	April 20, 2012	Domino Recording Company
United Kingdom and worldwide	April 30, 2012	Domino Recording Company
United States	May 1, 2012	Domino Recording Company

== Music and lyrics ==
Everybody wanted to make a touching album, twelve songs that just touched people. I think that was our only rule. You know, we're known for [using] bicycles and branches [as instruments], but I think that writing great songs is still the most important thing for a band to be doing.

— Patrick Watson

The songs of Adventures in Your Own Backyard are described as "boisterous and pretty, alive and roaming, fairytales with Watson’s skimming falsetto", and continue in the band's signature style of cinematic and orchestral pop. Like the band's previous release, Wooden Arms, the album contains a few unusual instruments, including a glass marimba on one track, but in general features less of the experimental sound, opting instead for "an eloquent, perhaps deceptive, simplicity" and more mature production. According to Watson, the album is much subtler and "a bit more grounded, less airy... still kind of dreamy but with its feet on the ground", and he expressed a desire for his audience to focus more on the emotions behind the music than simply on the instruments used in its creation. He also expressed a certain dissatisfaction with the previous album, saying that singing its songs didn't give him the "melodic goosebumps", and for this album wanted to write songs that just "felt really good to sing".

Writing for The Globe and Mail, music critic Brad Wheeler noted the band's stylistic changes, calling Adventures in Your Own Backyard "a dreamy bath of chamber-pop and fancy cabaret, less clacky without the kitchen-utensil or bike-wheel percussion of Wooden Arms and slightly more grounded than Close to Paradise". It was also described by another critic as a "pensive and downtempo affair", with "slow-burning melodies [that] take entire songs to ignite memorable hooks".

Thematically, the album was inspired by the concept of home, and especially the group's native province of Quebec. The track "Strange Crooked Road" contains stories from the family of a friend of the band, while "Words in the Fire" was written at a campfire in northern Quebec. In addition, the album's lyrics were intended to provoke the listener into taking a second look at the world around them, which Watson explains by saying,

"Fundamentally, I’d like to write songs that people can carry with them in their daily life and bring them some sort of adventure. Maybe they’ll notice stuff they’re missing that’s right beside them. I hope my music can allow people to catch little details, like when they’re walking down the street, and bring a little bit of creativity and magic to the everyday world."

== Reception ==
Professional ratings
Aggregate scores
Source	Rating
Metacritic	71/100
Review scores
Source	Rating
Allmusic	3.5/5 stars
Consequence of Sound	3.5/4 stars
Edmonton Journal	4/5 stars
The Gazette (Montreal)	4/5 stars
The Globe and Mail	3.5/4 stars
The Grid	6/10
The Guardian	3/5 stars
La Presse	4.5/5 stars
Now	4/5 stars
Toronto Star	3/4 stars

Adventures in Your Own Backyard mostly received positive reviews from critics. Olivier Robillard Laveaux of Voir called it "magnificent" and "a success in every way", while Bernard Perusse of The Gazette called it "another haunting, atmospheric gem that doesn’t base its resonance on singsong hooks" and "somewhat unsettling, often dreamlike, but never predictable and always challenging". Jian Ghomeshi of the CBC Radio One show Q called it a "really beautiful record" and predicted that it would garner the band a lot of attention.

However, Dave Simpson of The Guardian gave the album a mixed review, calling it "pretty stuff, with breathtaking production which doesn't quite conceal a shortage of strong songs" and saying that the album "doesn't land enough killer blows". This opinion was echoed by Chris Bilton of The Grid, who said that though the album contains "worthy sonic adventures", few of them are "memorable enough to get stuck in your head".

The album was named as a longlisted nominee for the 2012 Polaris Music Prize on June 14, 2012.

=== Commercial performance ===
Adventures in Your Own Backyard was the top-selling album on the Canadian iTunes Store for the week ending on April 22. The album debuted at number two on the Canadian Albums Chart with 14,670 copies sold. On June 28, 2012, the album was certified gold by Music Canada, for shipping over 40,000 copies nationwide.

== Track listing ==
1. "Lighthouse" – 4:46
2. "Blackwind" – 3:54
3. "Step Out for a While" – 4:03
4. "The Quiet Crowd" – 3:56
5. "Into Giants" – 4:28
6. "Morning Sheets" – 3:24
7. "Words in the Fire" – 3:53
8. "The Things You Do" – 3:58
9. "Strange Crooked Road" – 3:43
10. "Noisy Sunday" – 4:01
11. "Adventures in Your Own Backyard" – 4:51
12. "Swimming Pools" – 2:54

iTunes Store bonus track

13. "The Things We Do" – 4:44

== Personnel ==
- Simon Angell – guitar
- Robbie Kuster – drums
- Mishka Stein – bass
- Patrick Watson – vocals, piano
