= Fiction (EP) =

EP by Suuns
- Released: October 30, 2020
- Genre: Avant rock; psychedelic
- Length: 19:59
- Label: Secret City; Joyful Noise

Suuns chronology
Felt (2020)	Fiction (2020)	The Witness (2021)

Singles from Fiction
- 1. "Pray" Released: September 16, 2020; 2. "Breathe" Released: October 7, 2020; 3. "Fiction" Released: October 22, 2020

Fiction is an extended play by the Canadian rock band Suuns, released October 30, 2020 via Secret City Records and Joyful Noise Recordings.

== Background ==
Fiction was announced September 2020 with a press release promising "new sounds and sonic directions" on an EP that "is as much a project of curation as it is one of creation: sifting, re-imagining, and re-framing, sometimes completely disassembling and then building from the ground up." The announcement came with the release of lead single "Pray", a leftover song cut from the band's 2016 album Hold/Still. Two more singles followed in the next month: "Breathe", featuring prior collaborators Jerusalem in My Heart, and title track "Fiction", came out October 7 and October 22 respectively.

== Style ==
The album has been described as avant rock and psychedelic music.

== Critical reception ==
Fiction ratings
Review scores
Source	Rating
Pitchfork	6.9/10
New Noise	3/5 stars
Exclaim!	7/10

For Exclaim!, Daniel Sylvester wrote of the EP, "Although Fiction feels and sounds like more of an experiment than it does an important part of their discography, there's no way to deny that these six tracks demonstrate Suuns' willingness to mess with the way they approach their craft, giving the listener a beacon of hope for future works." Pitchfork's Will Ainsley said that despite it being brief, the EP "never feels insubstantial because the sound of the whole thing is so spectacular", and called the project "something more instinctive and assured" than the band's past output, but also that "it's tempting to want more, more clearly-defined songs, more beats, more aggression, more of that sublime bweebeebewboo guitar line; there are only two straight-up-and-down songs here while the rest feel like sketches." New Noise writer Ryan Beitler said the band "are breaking barriers and reaching beyond the underground in the process." Laura Stewart of 25YL called the project "joyfully chilling", and called the opening track "black ambience with shades of Bowie's Black Star [sic]".

== Track listing ==
All tracks are written by Suuns.

Fiction track listing
No.	Title	Length
1.	"Look"	3:31
2.	"Breathe" (featuring Jerusalem in My Heart)	2:30
3.	"Pray"	4:33
4.	"Fiction"	3:18
5.	"Death" (featuring Amber Webber)	2:57
6.	"Trouble Every Day"	3:10
Total length:		19:59
