= The Witness (album) =

Studio album by Suuns
- Released: September 3, 2021
- Recorded: December 2019–September 2020
- Studios: Breakglass, Le Plateau-Mont-Royal, Montreal; Studio Toute Garnie, Mile End, Montreal
- Genres: Post-punk; post-rock; Krautrock
- Length: 37:54
- Labels: Joyful Noise; Secret City
- Producer: John Congleton

Suuns chronology
Fiction EP (2020)	The Witness (2021)

The Witness is a 2021 album by Canadian rock band Suuns, released on September 3, 2021, by Joyful Noise Recordings and Secret City Records. The album was recorded from December 2019 through September 2020 at Breakglass Studios, with additional tracking at Studio Toute Garnie, both in Montreal.

== Reception ==
The Witness ratings
Aggregate scores
Source	Rating
Metacritic	80/100
Review scores
Source	Rating
AllMusic	4.5/5 stars
Beats Per Minute	69/100
The Line of Best Fit	7/10
Loud and Quiet	9/10
Pitchfork	7.5/10
Uncut	7/10

According to the review aggregator Metacritic, The Witness received "generally favorable reviews" based on a weighted average score of 80 out of 100 from 6 critic scores. Pitchfork's Phillipe Roberts called The Witness Suuns' "most cohesive album yet, the first that never gets lost in its own dark gravity", and that the album "unlocks a parallel universe for the band, and though Suuns are still sculpting monoliths to paranoia, to hear them chipping away with such steady hands is a welcome treat." Loud and Quiet's Zara Hedderman called the album "immediately immersive" and "an excellent and engrossing record" on which the band includes "more patience and consideration applied to their performances."

The Line of Best Fit's Aymeric Dubois wrote that "The Witness has the power to guide you in a sensory journey where abstract, psychedelic, futuristic or exoticism are mixed", but that "the only small thorn lies in the melodies and vocals, sometimes too shy or idealistic to sublimate the whole." Dusted's Tim Clarke wrote that "The more you listen to The Witness, the harder it is to grasp. There’s no denying that its elusive character is part of its charm, but there are stretches where it feels more evasive than elusive, stubbornly refusing to engage more directly."

Beats Per Minute's Tim Sentz wrote "Continuing down the path they set out on with 2016's Hold/Still, Canada's Suuns have finally, it seems, arrived at a rewarding destination on their latest, The Witness - an immersive electronic abyss" and that producer John Congleton helps "to uncover crevices of Suuns' noise potential", but that "Some of the lacking aspects of their previous record have carried over, albeit minutely" and "While The Witness is a certain improvement from Felt, it remains a bit mixed", concluding by calling the project "a serviceable post-punk album, one that ends up as an interesting listen but with little to pull us back to it." AllMusic's Fred Thomas called the album "a consumptive listening experience, designed with precision and purpose in the same way as the immersive albums that came before it by Portishead, Talk Talk, Radiohead, and other artists willing to take their time systematically disassembling and rebuilding their music."

=== Year-end lists ===
The Witness year-end lists
Publication	#	Ref.
Nothing but Hope and Passion	44	

== Track listing ==
All tracks are written by Suuns.

The Witness track listing
No.	Title	Length
1.	"Third Stream"	7:09
2.	"Witness Protection"	4:09
3.	"C-Thru"	3:35
4.	"Timebender"	3:53
5.	"Clarity"	4:31
6.	"The Fix"	2:39
7.	"Go to My Head"	5:56
8.	"The Trilogy"	6:02
Total length:		37:54

== Personnel ==
- All songs written and performed by SUUNS.
- John Congleton – producer, mixer
- Jace Lasek – engineer, mixer (track 4)
- Ryan Morey – mastering
- Max Henry – synth (tracks 2, 4, 7)
- Mathieu Charbonneau – synth (tracks 1, 3, 5)
- Erik Hove – saxophone, flute (tracks 1, 5)
- Studio Safar – design
- Myriam Boulos – cover photo
