= Cursed (band) =

Canadian band

- Origin: Canada
- Genres: Crust punk; sludge metal
- Years active: 2001–2008
- Labels: Deathwish Inc.; Goodfellow Records; Reflections Records; Hex; High Anxiety
- Spinoff of: The Swarm aka Knee Deep in the Dead
- Past members: Chris Colohan; Christian McMaster; Dan Dunham; Mike "The Mauler" Maxymuik; Radwan Ghazi Moumneh; Tom "Dot Com" Piraino
- Website: www.yourfuckingfuneral.blogspot.com

Cursed was a Canadian hardcore punk band formed in 2001 and dissolved in 2008. It featured members from Montreal, Toronto, and Hamilton of various other Canadian DIY bands such as Haymaker, Left for Dead, The Swarm aka Knee Deep in the Dead, Acrid, Ruination, The Black Hand, Countdown to Oblivion, At the Mercy of Inspiration, Shallow North Dakota, Crux of Aux, Quest for Fire and Burning Love.

== Career ==
Cursed was formed in 2001, by Chris Colohan, Mike Maxymuik, and Christian McMaster, a year after the break-up of their previous band, The Swarm aka Knee Deep in the Dead. They were joined by bassist Radwan Ghazi Moumneh, formerly vocalist in the Quebec Arabian-influenced hardcore band Ire. The band quickly became known for its nihilistic and dystopian lyrical themes, stark classic horror imagery and loud, abrasive live shows. In 2003, they released their debut album on Deathwish Inc., which garnered wide cult support. Moumneh switched to second guitar, allowing bassist Tom Piraino to join the lineup; Piraino and McMaster had previously played in the band Funerary together.

Cursed followed with 2005's II, on Goodfellow Records. In 2007, they released the picture-disc EP Blackout At Sunrise, and a 180gr vinyl gatefold reissue of 2003's I on the label Trash Art!. In 2008, they released their third LP, III: Architects of Troubled Sleep, on Goodfellow Records in North America, Howling Bull in Japan and, in Europe, the Dutch label Reflections Records. III was produced at Toronto's Hallamusic studio, mixed by long-time friend and collaborator Donny Cooper, and mastered by Alan Douches at West West Side Music, with cover art by Baroness' John Dyer Baizley. The band had long been touring internationally but, for this album, it played six weekends of strictly Southern Ontario DIY shows. The official release show was in Toronto, at a sold out Lee's Palace, with 50Watthead, Career Suicide and Living Darkness.

The band then went on a European tour and, on May 22, 2008, Chris Colohan announced from Germany that the band had been robbed of their passports, and all of their money and tour expenses. Colohan described the robbery as a "bullet in the head" for the band. A hectic final show at Bitterzoet in Amsterdam would be their last.

== Post-breakup ==
Colohan released the band's final UK radio session (their last recording) as a 7-inch EP on High Anxiety. Deathwish Inc reissued the vinyl repress of Cursed I, which quickly sold out.

Mike Maxymuik subsequently joined the band Quest for Fire and was a touring drummer for Pink Mountaintops. Dan Dunham continued to play in Crux of Aux, and in the bands Skull and Limitoids. Chris Colohan continued to tour and play with Burning Love and Mature Situations, and runs the vinyl-only High Anxiety label. In 2016, he formed the band SECT, composed of Andy Hurley (Fall Out Boy, Vegan Reich, Racetraitor) on drums, James Chang (Catharsis, Undying) and Scott Crouse (Earth Crisis, Path of Resistance) on guitar, and Ian Edwards (Earth Crisis, Path of Resistance) on bass. Radwan Moumneh went on to open the Hotel2Tango recording studio in Montreal, with partners from Godspeed You Black Emperor and Constellation Records, and continues with his performance art project Jerusalem in My Heart.

== Band members ==
=== Final lineup ===
- Chris Colohan – vocals (2001–2008)
- Christian McMaster – guitar (2001–2008)
- Dan Dunham – bass (2005–2008)
- Mike "The Mauler" Maxymuik – drums (2001–2008)

=== Former ===
- Radwan Ghazi Moumneh : bass (2001–2003), guitar (2003–2005)
- Tom "Dot Com" Piraino: bass (2003–2005)

== Discography ==
=== Albums ===
- I (2003, Deathwish Inc.)
- II (2005, Goodfellow Records)
- III: Architects of Troubled Sleep (2008, Goodfellow Records)

=== EPs & Demos ===
- "Cursed Demo Recording" (2002, Self-Released)
- Hell Comes Home EP (2004, Hex Records)
- Blackout At Sunrise EP (2007, Goodfellow Records)
- The Last Session EP (2010, High Anxiety)

=== Music videos ===
- Fatalist (2006)
