= The End of That =

Studio album by Plants and Animals
- Released: February 28, 2012
- Genre: Indie rock
- Length: 44:15
- Label: Secret City Records

Plants and Animals chronology
La La Land (2010)	The End of That (2012)	Waltzed in from the Rumbling (2016)

The End of That is the third full-length album by Canadian indie rock band Plants and Animals, released on February 28, 2012 on Secret City Records.

The album was recorded at La Frette Studios near Paris, France, with engineer Lionel Darenne. Unlike the band's earlier albums, which were developed through improvisational jamming in the studio, the band developed the material for The End of That in advance, resulting in a far faster completion rate than any of the earlier albums.

The album's first single, "Lightshow", was released as a 7" single, with a previously unreleased cover of Wolf Parade's "I'll Believe in Anything" as its B-side, and subsequently topped CBC Radio 3's The R3-30 weekly singles chart on February 11. The title song, "The End of That", was used as the credits song of the 2013 film Drinking Buddies, starring Olivia Wilde and Jake Johnson.

The album debuted at number 46 in Canada.

== Track listing ==
1. "Before" – 3:56
2. "The End of That" – 4:04
3. "Song for Love" – 4:40
4. "Lightshow" – 3:35
5. "Crisis!" – 6:08
6. "2010" – 6:33
7. "HC" – 0:51
8. "Why & Why" – 2:27
9. "Control Me" – 4:15
10. "No Idea" – 2:35
11. "Runaways" – 5:11

iTunes-only bonus tracks

12. "Shakey Shakey Shakey" – 7:35
13. "Brokedown" – 5:44

== Personnel ==
Credits adapted from Discogs

- Warren C. Spicer – vocals, acoustic guitar, electric guitar, bass, piano, organ, synthesizer, mixing
- Nicolas Basque – electric guitar, classical guitar, synthesizer, vocals
- Matthew Woodley – drums, percussion, vocals
- Olivier Bloch-Lainé – bass (track 2)
- Caroline Desilets – vocals (tracks 2,5), piano (track 5), inside photo
- Emilie Clepper – vocals (tracks 2,5)
- Hanako Hoshimi-Caines – vocals (tracks 2,5)
- Katie Moore – vocals (tracks 2,5)
- Plants And Animals – producers
- Ryan Morey – mastering
- Carl Rowatti – vinyl mastering
- Graham Lessard – mixing
- Lionel Darenne – recording
- Nicolas Quéré – recording assistant
- Trevor Browne – cover, layout
