= SECT =

American hardcore punk band

- Origin: Raleigh, North Carolina and Portland, Oregon (United States); Toronto, Ontario (Canada)
- Genres: Metalcore, crust punk
- Years active: 2015–present
- Label: Southern Lord
- Members: Chris Colohan; James Chang; Scott Crouse; Andy Hurley; Steve Hart

SECT is an American-Canadian vegan straight edge band formed in 2015, consisting of vocalist Chris Colohan, guitarists James Chang and Scott Crouse, bassist Steve Hart and drummer Andy Hurley. It released a self-titled debut album in 2016 and, after a signing to Southern Lord, the sophomore No Cure for Death in 2017.

SECT members come from several 1990s and 2000s political hardcore bands, including Cursed, Catharsis, Undying, Earth Crisis, Day Of Suffering, and Racetraitor. The band's musical style has been described as a mix of metallic hardcore and crust punk, and their lyrics tackle several socio-political issues.

== History ==
SECT's origins date back to an Earth Crisis tour where Andy Hurley filled in as temporary drummer and invited guitarist Scott Crouse to form a band. The project swayed in different directions until guitarist Jimmy Chang of Catharsis and Undying joined them and helped to define their style. In the past, Hurley had also talked with vocalist Chris Colohan while he toured with Burning Love about starting a vegan straight edge band, and after trying two or three vocalists for SECT he remembered this and the lineup solidified with Colohan and Earth Crisis bassist Ian Edwards on board.

On June 28, 2016, the band was formally announced and they premiered three songs along with the release date of their self-titled album. On July 8, 2016, a few days after the shootings of Alton Sterling and Philando Castile, SECT released the track "Curfew" accompanied by a statement which condemns "the rising death toll in one of the worst mass murders in modern western history". The song was written in the aftermath of the death of Freddie Gray (April 2015), but they did not release it at the time to "not come off as insensitive, opportune or self-serving".

SECT released their self-titled debut album on August 5, 2016, co-produced and mixed by Crouse and Chang, and mastered by Alan Douches. It was self-released in North America with distribution by Deathwish Inc., and available worldwide from various labels: Reflections in Europe, Alliance Trax in Japan, Caustic in Brazil and Cactus in Malaysia.

In February 2017, SECT signed to Southern Lord Records for their upcoming second album, with Colohan citing their mutual respect and his previous work on the label with Burning Love for this. In March, the band played three shows in the Northeast. On the first weekend of July, they began their recording sessions. On October 11, 2017, SECT announced No Cure for Death, produced by Kurt Ballou at his GodCity Studio and mastered by Douches, in addition to Steve Hart of Day of Suffering joining as new bassist. On October 25, the band premiered the song "Open Grave" and on November 9, a music video was released for the track "Day for Night", directed by Justin Reich. The album was released on November 24, 2017. From the release date to December 10, the band toured the American Northwest, Vancouver, and the American Northeast. In February 2018, SECT and Die Young played three shows in California, and in March, SECT and Hive toured the Midwest.

From September to early November 2018, Cameron Joplin of Ecostrike filled in as drummer due to Hurley's professional commitments. In November, SECT co-headlined a European tour with Gust and CLEARxCUT. In March 2019, SECT and Earth Crisis toured Japan. From June 29 to July 4, 2019, the band and Terror supported Converge on a European tour. On August 30, 2019, the band released the album Blood of the Beasts.

== Musical style and lyrics ==
Most SECT songs are fast-paced, rarely exceeding two minutes, and feature blast-beats, raspy screamed vocals, a crude, low-tuned guitar tone which uses HM-2 distortion along with noisy feedback, and both atypical breakdowns and song structures. SECT style has been described as "filthy and sinister ... metallic hardcore" and "blasting ugly ... D-beat crustcore". Record label Southern Lord billed them as a "barrage of grinding crust and metallic hardcore wrath". Kerrang! called them a "NAILS-ish vegan straight edge hardcore" band. New Noise Magazine stated that SECT inspirations include D-beat bands including Wolfbrigade, Anti Cimex and Totalitär, in addition to other heavy bands such as Hail of Bullets, Skitsystem and Amebix. Scott Crouse cited His Hero Is Gone, Behemoth and Entombed as main influences on SECT .

SECT lyrics deal with socio-political diatribes against the status quo, which, according to the band, is on the verge of "Orwellian police states and irreparable social and ecological disasters". Among its many targets are systemic racism, religious beliefs, nuclear warfare, drug use, ecological catastrophes, economic slavery and the animal industry. SECT members are vegan straight edge. When asked about his lyrical motivation, Chris Colohan said, "Catharsis. ... If music is a vent for your frustrations, and you're drawing those on the bleak, authoritarian, unfair realities of the world around you, you could hardly have a more urgent moment in history to find things to scream about in all directions than the present".

== Discography ==
Studio albums

- SECT (2016)
- No Cure for Death (2017)
- Blood of the Beasts (2019)
- Plagues Upon Plagues (2024)
