= Radwan Ghazi Moumneh =

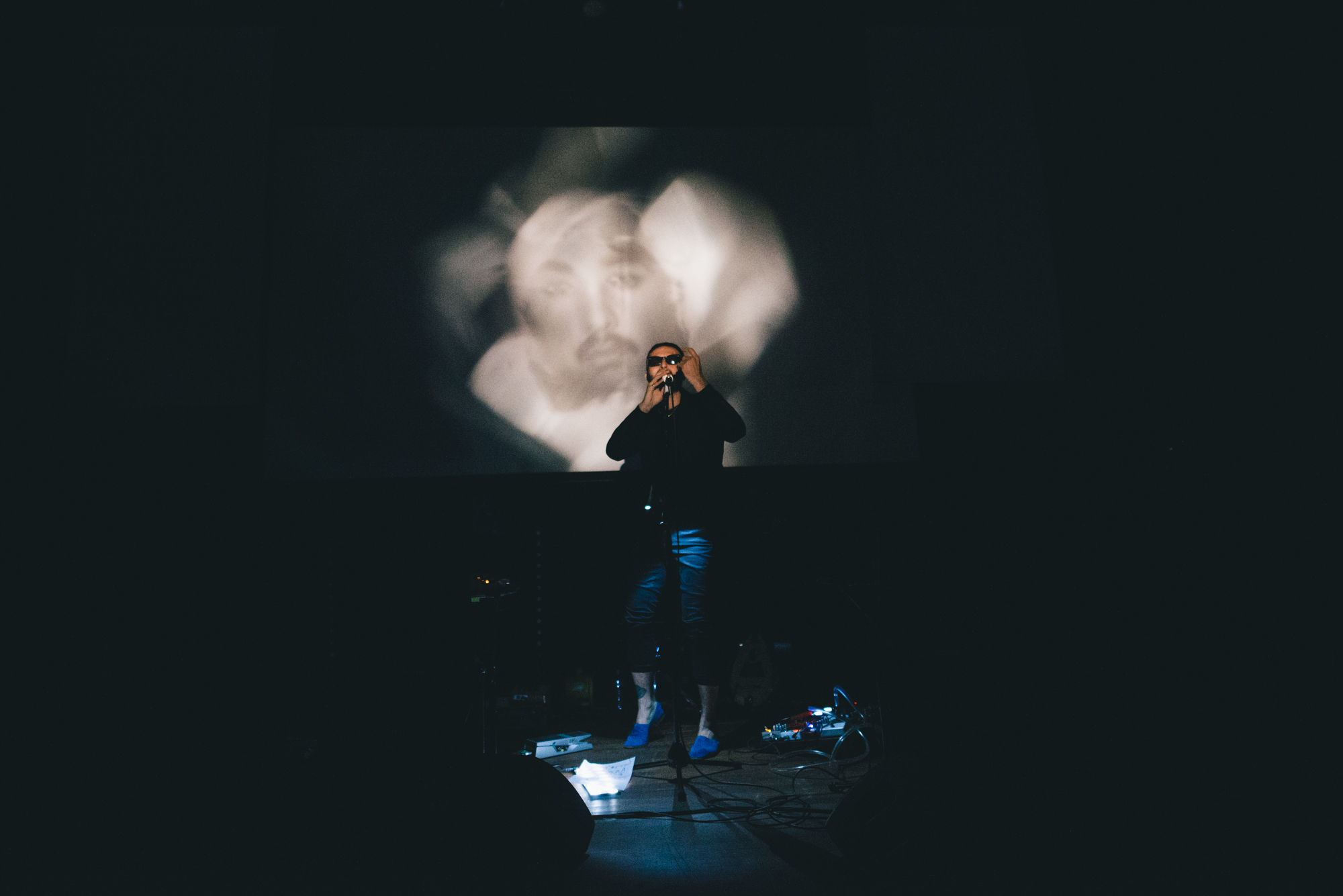
- Radwan Ghazi Moumneh performing live.

Background information
- Origin: Montreal, Quebec, Canada
- Genres: punk; indie; avant-garde
- Occupation(s): Producer, recording engineer, musician
- Instrument(s): Synthesizer, Guitar, Buzuq

Radwan Ghazi Moumneh is a Canadian recording engineer, producer, and musician.

Moumneh's family fled the Lebanese Civil War for the Sultanate of Oman, where he grew up, moving to Montreal in 1993. Throughout the mid-1990s and early-2000s Moumneh recorded, and toured with, a number of Montreal-based hardcore and punk bands such as The Black Hand and IRE. In 2004, Moumneh established the Hotel2Tango recording studio with Howard Bilerman, Efrim Menuck, and Thierry Amar (the later two are core members of Godspeed You! Black Emperor and Thee Silver Mt. Zion Memorial Orchestra). In 2005, Moumneh began performing live as Jerusalem in My Heart with a number of collaborators, a project with whom he has released two full-length records. Jerusalem In My Heart also released a collaborative album with Suuns – Suuns and Jerusalem in My Heart – (whom Moumneh had previously recorded). As a recording engineer and producer Moumneh has worked with an assortment of acts including Suuns, Mashrou' Leila, ...And the Saga Continues, Matana Roberts, and Ought (band).

In 2011, Ghazi Moumneh collaborated with Alexis O'Hara to create music for Montreal performance art drag duo, 2boys.tv's processional HIV/AIDS memorial Tightrope (2011-2016) which premiered at Buddies in Bad Times Theatre in Toronto.

== Discography ==
=== Jerusalem in My Heart ===
- Qalaq LP/CD/BOXSET (2021, Constellation Records (Canada))
- Daqa'iq Tudaiq LP/CD (2018, Constellation Records (Canada))
- If He Dies, If If If If If If LP/CD (2015, Constellation Records (Canada))
- Suuns and Jerusalem in My Heart LP/CD (2015, Secretly Canadian)
- Mo7it Al-Mo7it LP/CD (2013, Constellation Records (Canada))

=== Radwan Ghazi Moumneh & Eric Chenaux ===
- The Sentimental Moves LP (2012, Grapefruit (music label))

=== Land of Kush ===
- Monogamy LP (2010, Constellation Records (Canada))
- Against The Day LP/CD (2009, Constellation Records (Canada))

=== Pas Chic Chic ===
- Au Contraire (album) LP (2008, Semprini Records)

=== Cursed (band) ===
- II (Cursed album) LP/CD (2005, Goodfellow Records)
- II (Cursed album) LP/CD (2003, Deathwish Inc.)

=== The Black Hand ===
- War Monger (album) LP/CD (2002, Scorched Earth Policy Records)
- Pulling Your Strings (album) LP/CD (2001, Scorched Earth Policy Records)

=== IRE ===
- What Seed, What Root (album) LP/CD (1999, CrimethInc.)
- I Discern an Overtone of Tragedy in Your Voice (album) LP/CD (1998, The Mountain Collective For Independent Artists, Ltd.)
- Adversity Into Triumph (album) LP/CD (1996, Ellington Records (music label))
