= Lovebot =

Logo

A two-dimensional front design of the Lovebot toy also known as the "Impact Design"

The Lovebot character was created by Toronto artist and designer Matthew Del Degan, consisting of a geometric, faceless robot with a red heart logo (called the "hero heart") on its torso. The character is used as a symbol for the "Love Invasion," a movement that aims to share love and kindness globally. He invented the idea for the campaign and character after moving to Toronto and noting the uninspired actions of city subway passengers and realizing he personally felt that people needed to express more compassion.

Del Degan chose to add the heart to the robot's design to signify that people of the city have ability to love and be kind to one another. He decided to use concrete as the Lovebot's artistic medium, which he felt referenced Toronto's urban architecture and history.

The campaign was initially created as a street sticker art campaign but Del Degan and his team eventually chose to also create more than 100, 2 foot concrete statues, each weighing 200 pounds which they placed throughout Toronto. Each robot sculpture was made by hand in his backyard with over 30 volunteers. Each robot is now dedicated to a person who has made a difference in some way and is intended to inspire others into performing additional acts of kindness. In 2013 the campaign took off with a great deal of press coverage, like the Toronto Star, MTV and The Grid (which gave Del Degan a Mensch Award for his work with the Lovebot character and named him one of fifty individuals that had "made Toronto a better place this year").

Lovebot is now a brand owned and operated by Matthew Del Degan. Together the company offers Lovebot merchandise and a toy design that was crowd funded through Kickstarter. In addition, the Lovebot continues to be a vital part of Del Degan's artistic practice in street art and design. Those volunteering for Lovebot continue to work together under the name "The Lovebot Leaders." The group has doubled since its conception has plans for global outreach. The Lovebot Leaders also emphasize work with charitable initiatives while continuing to build and distribute Lovebot sculptures.
