= La La Land (Plants and Animals album) =

Studio album by Plants and Animals
- Released: April 20, 2010
- Genre: Indie rock
- Label: Secret City Records

Plants and Animals chronology
Parc Avenue (2008)	La La Land (2010)	The End of That (2012)

Professional ratings
Review scores
Source	Rating
Pitchfork Media	(6.1/10)

La La Land is the second full-length album by Canadian indie rock band Plants and Animals, released April 20, 2010 on Secret City Records.

The album was a longlisted nominee for the 2010 Polaris Music Prize.

== Track listing ==
1. "Tom Cruz" – 4:53
2. "Swinging Bells" – 2:27
3. "American Idol" – 3:02
4. "Undone Melody" – 6:05
5. "Kon Tiki" – 3:23
6. "Game Shows" – 5:11
7. "The Mama Papa" – 4:19
8. "Fake It" – 4:20
9. "Celebration" – 4:57
10. "Future from the 80s" – 4:16
11. "Jeans Jeans Jeans" – 3:44
