= Wave (Patrick Watson album) =

Studio album by Patrick Watson
- Released: October 18, 2019
- Label: Secret City; Domino

Patrick Watson chronology
| Love Songs for Robots (2015) | Wave (2019) | Better in the Shade (2022) |

Wave is the sixth studio album released by Canadian group Patrick Watson. It was released on October 19, 2019.

== Critical reception ==
Professional ratings
Aggregate scores
| Source | Rating |
|---|---|
| AnyDecentMusic? | 7.5/10 |
| Metacritic | 73/100 |
Review scores
| Source | Rating |
| Exclaim! | 8/10 stars |
| Sputnikmusic | 4.5/5 stars |

Wave received generally favorable reviews from critics. At Metacritic, which assigns a normalized rating out of 100 to reviews from mainstream publications, the album received an average score of 73 based on 7 reviews.

In the Sputnikmusic review, staff member SowingSeason praised the album as "texturally and aesthetically jaw-dropping, perfected by an artist who clearly took his time accentuating the beauty and sadness of every moment."

The album was a Juno Award nominee for Adult Alternative Album of the Year at the Juno Awards of 2020.

== Track listing ==
| No. | Title | Length |
|---|---|---|
| 1. | "Dream for Dreaming" | 3:39 |
| 2. | "The Wave" | 4:17 |
| 3. | "Strange Rain" | 2:59 |
| 4. | "Melody Noir" | 3:15 |
| 5. | "Broken" | 4:37 |
| 6. | "Turn Out the Lights" | 4:14 |
| 7. | "Wild Flower" | 3:40 |
| 8. | "Look at You" | 3:12 |
| 9. | "Drive" | 3:27 |
| 10. | "Here Comes the River" | 4:14 |
| Total length: | | 37:34 |

== Charts ==
| Chart (2019) | Peak position |
|---|---|
| Belgian Albums (Ultratop Flanders) | 74 |
| Belgian Albums (Ultratop Wallonia) | 191 |
| Canadian Albums (Billboard) | 2 |
| French Albums (SNEP) | 109 |
| Dutch Albums (Album Top 100) | 59 |
| Portuguese Albums (AFP) | 7 |
| Swiss Albums (Schweizer Hitparade) | 87 |
