= Quest for Fire =

Quest for Fire may refer to:

- The Quest for Fire, a 1911 novel by J. H. Rosny
- Quest for Fire (film), a 1981 film adaptation of the 1911 novel
- "Quest for Fire", a song by Iron Maiden from 1983's Piece of Mind
- Quest for Fire (album), a 2023 album by Skrillex
- Quest for Fire: Firestarter, Vol. 1, an album by Kardinal Offishall
- Quest for Fire (band), a Canadian psychedelic rock band
