= With/Avec =

EP by Plants and Animals
- Released: 2007
- Genre: indie rock
- Label: Secret City Records

Plants and Animals chronology
Plants and Animals (2005)	With/Avec (2007)	Parc Avenue (2008)

With/Avec is the second EP by Canadian indie rock band Plants and Animals, released in 2007 on Secret City Records.

== Track listing ==
1. Lola Who?
2. Trials and Tribulations
3. Faerie Dance
4. Guru/Sinnerman
