= Waltzed in from the Rumbling =

Studio album by Plants and Animals
- Released: April 29, 2016
- Genre: Indie rock
- Length: 41:54
- Label: Secret City Records

Plants and Animals chronology
The End of That (2012)	Waltzed in from the Rumbling (2016)

Waltzed in from the Rumbling is the fourth full-length album by Canadian indie rock band Plants and Animals, released April 29, 2016 on Secret City Records.

== Track listing ==
1. "We Were One" – 4:55
2. "No Worries Gonna Find Us" – 4:51
3. "Fata Morgana" – 1:14
4. "Stay" – 3:08
5. "All of the Time" – 3:41
6. "So Many Nights" – 3:47
7. "Flowers" – 3:05
8. "Je voulais te dire" – 7:02
9. "Off the Water" – 4:08
10. "Johnny Is a Drummer" – 2:36
11. "Pure Heart" – 3:27
