= Better in the Shade =

Studio album by Patrick Watson
- Released: April 22, 2022
- Length: 21:41
- Label: Secret City

Patrick Watson chronology
Wave (2019)	Better in the Shade (2022)	Uh Oh (2025)

Better in the Shade is the seventh studio album released by Canadian group Patrick Watson. It was released on April 22, 2022.

== Critical reception ==
Professional ratings
Aggregate scores
Source	Rating
Metacritic	78/100
Review scores
Source	Rating
Exclaim!	7/10
Sputnikmusic	4.0/5

Better in the Shade received generally favorable reviews from critics. At Metacritic, which assigns a normalized rating out of 100 to reviews from mainstream publications, the album received an average score of 78 based on 4 reviews.

In the Sputnikmusic review, staff member Sunnyvale praised the album as "the sonic equivalent of living, breathing, human warmth".

== Track listing ==
Better in the Shade track listing
No.	Title	Length
1.	"Better in the Shade"	3:36
2.	"Height of the Feeling" (with La Force)	3:59
3.	"Ode to Vivian"	1:29
4.	"Little Moments"	2:46
5.	"Blue"	3:52
6.	"La La La La La"	1:51
7.	"Stay" (with Sea Oleena)	4:08
Total length:		21:41

== Charts ==
Chart performance for Better in the Shade
Chart (2022)	Peak position
Canadian Albums (Billboard)	90
