= Suuns and Jerusalem in My Heart =

Studio album by Suuns and Jerusalem in My Heart
- Released: April 13, 2015
- Length: 35:33
- Language: Arabic; English
- Label: Secretly Canadian
- Producer: Radwan Ghazi Moumneh

Suuns chronology
Images Du Futur (2013)	Suuns and Jerusalem in My Heart (2015)	Hold/Still (2016)

Jerusalem in My Heart chronology
Mo7it Al-Mo7it (2013)	Suuns and Jerusalem in My Heart (2015)	Daqa'iq Tudaiq (2018)

Suuns and Jerusalem in My Heart is a collaborative studio album by Canadian rock band Suuns and musical project Jerusalem in My Heart, led by Radwan Ghazi Moumneh. It was released on April 13, 2015, through the Secretly Canadian record label.

== Critical reception ==
Professional ratings
Aggregate scores
Source	Rating
Metacritic	72/100
Review scores
Source	Rating
Allmusic	3.5/5 stars
Drowned in Sound	6/10
Exclaim!	7/10
musicOMH	3.5/5 stars
Pitchfork	7.2/10

Upon its release, Suuns and Jerusalem in My Heart received positive reviews from music critics. At Metacritic, which assigns a normalized rating out of 100 to reviews from critics, the album received an average score of 72, which indicates "generally favorable reviews", based on 9 reviews. Allmusic critic Fred Thomas wrote: "While there's no clear mission statement or overarching theme to the album, the group's collective energy is exciting and propulsive throughout, sounding very much like a group of close friends ecstatically pushing each other into uncharted musical territory." Drowned in Sound's Russel Warfield described the album's content as "music with a strong pulse that also whispers its truths close to your ear, like an intimate conversation at the back of a booming dance club." musicOMH critic Eric Hill stated: "In many ways it offers lessons in collaborative best practice, with individual sonic identities preserved, yet with a willingness to divert from usual methods on both sides proves it’s much more than just a stop-gap in between their respective next albums."

Stuart Berman of Pitchfork stated: "Suuns and Jerusalem in My Heart does leave you wondering what more the two entities could have accomplished had they worked on this for more than a week." Joe Banks of The Quietus commented: Suuns And Jerusalem In My Heart is more than just a stopgap or indulgence, and with those first three tracks in particular, it pulls off a convincing and vital meld of contrasting cultural and sonic palettes. Banks further added: "And if not all of these experiments work, it's nevertheless proof once again of the myriad musical possibilities out there in the world just waiting to be brought into existence." The New York Times' John Pareles wrote: "Whether they are paced by programmed beats, guitars or both, and whether they lean toward rock, techno or vintage electronic Minimalism, the tracks are headed somewhere urgent."

Drowned in Sound critic Russel Warfield was mixed in his assessment of the album, writing: "The comparative simplicity of these songs makes this a more of a compelling curiosity piece, rather than the explosively satisfying--potentially classic--albums that both of these bands have in them as separate artists."

== Track listing ==
All tracks are written by Suuns and Jerusalem in My Heart.

1. "2amoutu 17tirakan" — 6:15
2. "Metal" — 3:50
3. "Seif" — 3:42
4. "In Touch" — 5:48
5. "Gazelles In Flight" — 5:13
6. "Leyla" — 2:03
7. "3attam Babey" — 8:44

== Personnel ==
Suuns

- Ben Shemie — vocals, guitar
- Joe Yarmush — guitar, bass, layout, artwork
- Max Henry — keyboards, bass
- Liam O'Neill — drums

Jerusalem in My Heart

- Radwan Ghazi Moumneh — vocals, instruments, production, mixing

Other personnel

- Ryan Morey — mastering
