= Love Songs for Robots =

Studio album by Patrick Watson
- Released: May 12, 2015
- Label: Secret City; Domino

Patrick Watson chronology
Adventures in Your Own Backyard (2012)	Love Songs for Robots (2015)	Wave (2019)

Love Songs for Robots is the fifth studio album released by Canadian group Patrick Watson. It was released on May 12, 2015.

The album was a long-listed nominee for the 2015 Polaris Music Prize.

== Track listing ==
1. "Love Songs for Robots"
2. "Good Morning Mr. Wolf"
3. "Bollywood"
4. "Hearts"
5. "Grace"
6. "In Circles"
7. "Turn Into the Noise"
8. "Alone in This World"
9. "Know That You Know"
10. "Places You Will Go"
