= Je te laisserai des mots =

Single by Patrick Watson
- Released: September 10, 2010
- Length: 2:40
- Label: Secret City
- Songwriter: Patrick Watson
- Producer: Patrick Watson

"Je te laisserai des mots" (lit. 'I will leave you some words') is a 2010 French-language song by Canadian musician Patrick Watson, written for the 2009 film Hidden Diary. In the early 2020s, the song experienced a revival after becoming popular on TikTok. In 2024, it became the first French-language song to cross one billion streams on Spotify.

== Background and recording ==
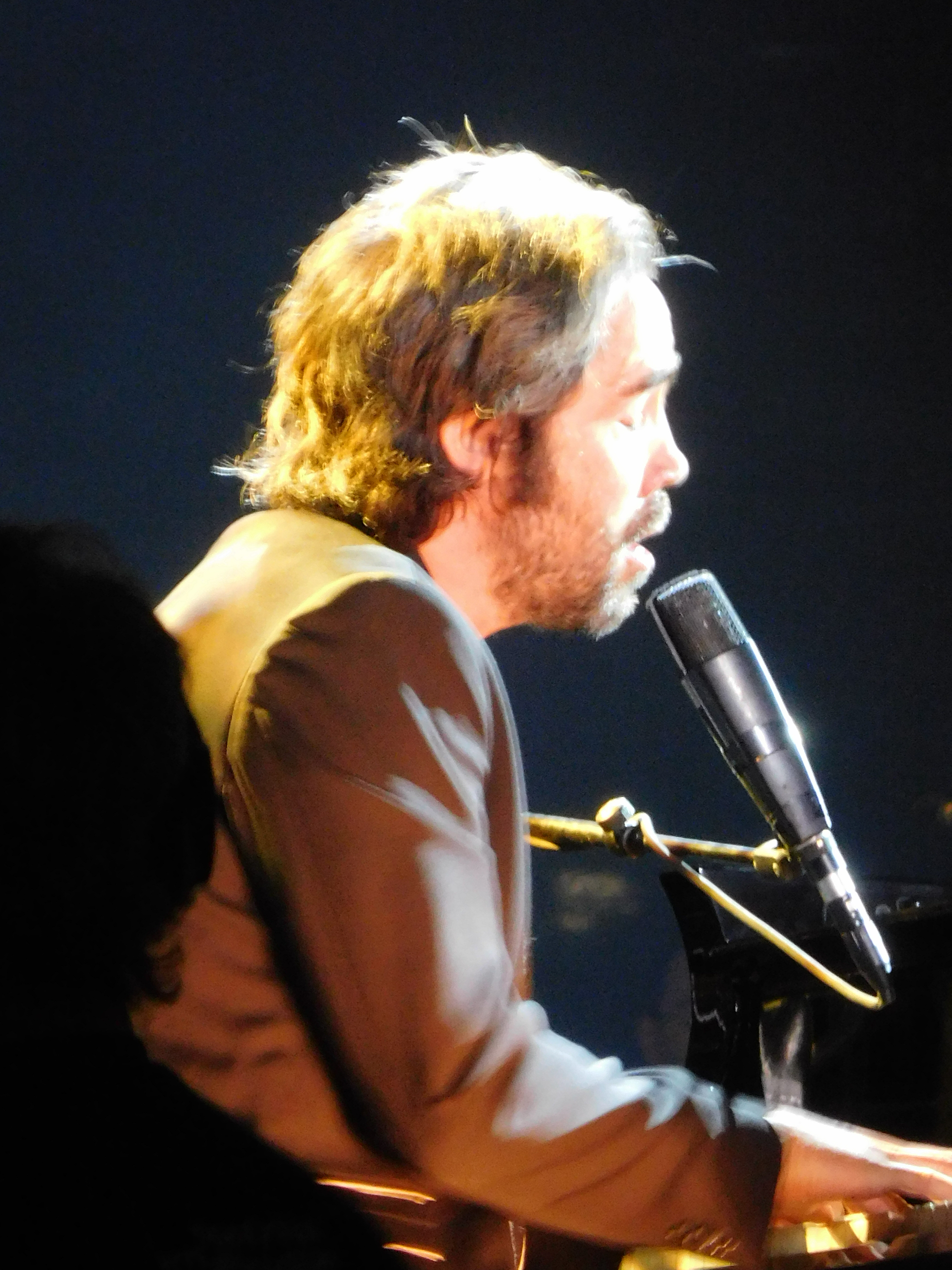
Watson in 2017

"Je te laisserai des mots" was originally written by Patrick Watson as part of his score to the 2009 film Hidden Diary (Mères et Filles), a French and Canadian co-production starring Catherine Deneuve, Marina Hands and Marie-Josée Croze. The song's title was inspired by a scene near the end of the film where the main character leaves a letter under a door.

It was Watson's first song written in French. Watson, an English speaker from Quebec, had "always been surrounded by French" and could speak the language but had never sung in it. He decided to keep any of his mistakes in the pronunciation, finding them to be part of the song's charm.

Watson wrote the melody for the song in his Montreal studio. Finding it difficult to sing in French due to the vowel structure, he opted not to build the song around many words. The song's first verse is wordless and features Watson vocalizing instead. He also expected the song to play at the end of the film, during ongoing dialogue, and felt that including more words would disrupt it.

The song was recorded in his studio, with the session including a string quartet composed of Ligia Paquin on Viola, Mélanie Bélair and Mélanie Vaugeois on violin and Annie Gadbois on cello. The crew eventually became "half-drunk" from drinking Jameson Irish whiskey during the string arrangement. According to Vaugeois, they tried for a while in vain "to find the right notes" before "everything was starting to slide when suddenly it all just fell into place". Watson plays piano on the track and handled production.

== Release ==
The song was first released as a single on September 10, 2010, coinciding with the theatrical release of Hidden Diary in Quebec. It was later released as a bonus track on the 2015 reissue of Watson's debut album Just Another Ordinary Day.

== Revival ==
The song achieved a surge in popularity in 2019 through a video on YouTube that set the song to archival footage of home movies. It experienced a broader surge in popularity on TikTok, where it went viral in 2021 and 2022, used to soundtrack the melancholy many users felt during the COVID-19 pandemic. It has also been used to soundtrack other sad moments as well as contrary emotions, including those at weddings, travels or pregnancy announcements.

In December 2024, the song amassed more than a billion streams on Spotify, becoming the first French-language song to do so. Watson reacted to the news on his social media, saying that he felt honored to be part of people's musical lives and expressing pride in the fact that the song was recorded in French: "I grew up in Montreal and I'm incredibly proud that a French song has crossed these boundaries. I spoke French since I was young. It's an incredible language, it has an incredible musical history and I feel very humbled to be a part of it." In 2025, Watson reflected on the song in an interview with The Guardian, stating that he never expected it to be listened to outside the context of the film.

Although Watson is the only credited songwriter on the track, he has since shared the royalties with the string quartet through an annual payment, which Vaugeois described as a "symbolic amount" to express his gratitude.

The song, as of January 2026, has amassed more than 1.3 billion streams on Spotify.

== Personnel ==
- Patrick Watson – piano, vocals, production, recording, mixing
- Annie Gadbois – cello
- Ligia Paquin – viola
- Mélanie Bélair – violin
- Mélanie Vaugeois – violin

== Charts ==
Chart	Peak position
Switzerland (Schweizer Hitparade)	87
UK Indie (OCC)	12
UK Indie Breakers (OCC)	2

== Certifications ==
Certifications for "Je te laisserai des mots"
Region	Certification	Certified units/sales
New Zealand (RMNZ)	2× Platinum	60,000^{‡}
Spain (Promusicae)	Platinum	60,000^{‡}
United Kingdom (BPI)	Platinum	600,000^{‡}
United States (RIAA)	2× Platinum	2,000,000^{‡}
^{‡} Sales+streaming figures based on certification alone.
