= Sea Oleena =

Canadian musician (born 1991)

Sea Oleena is the stage name of Charlotte Loseth (born May 18, 1991), a Canadian indie folk, dream pop and ambient musician based in Montreal, Quebec.

Originally from Saskatchewan, she released two EPs, Sea Oleena in 2010 and Sleeplessness in 2011, before releasing her full-length album Shallow in 2014.

She followed up in 2020 with the album Weaving a Basket. She released the single "Untethering" in 2021 to commemorate the reissue of that record.

She has since collaborated with Patrick Watson, including on the song "Stay" from his 2022 album Better in the Shade, and the title track from his 2025 album Uh Oh.

== Discography ==
- Sea Oleena - 2010
- Sleeplessness - 2011
- Shallow - 2014
- Weaving a Basket - 2020
- Untethering - 2021
