= Waterproof (disambiguation) =

Waterproof may refer to

- Waterproofing, the process of making an object waterproof or resistant to water
- Waterproof (film), a 2000 Christian drama film
- Waterproof, Louisiana, a village in northeastern Louisiana, United States
- Waterproof (comedian), Ghanaian comedian and actor
- Waterproof9, studio album of Patrick Watson
