= Uh Oh (Patrick Watson album) =

Studio album by Patrick Watson
- Released: September 26, 2025
- Length: 38:35
- Label: Secret City

Patrick Watson chronology
Better in the Shade (2022)	Uh Oh (2025)

Uh Oh is the eighth studio album released by Canadian musician Patrick Watson. It was released on September 26, 2025. Conceived after Watson suffered a vocal cord hemorrhage which resulted in him losing his voice for three months, the album features his songs being performed by various guest vocalists.

== Critical reception ==
Professional ratings
Aggregate scores
Source	Rating
Metacritic	80/100
Review scores
Source	Rating
AllMusic	4.0/5 stars
MusicOMH	4.0/5 stars

Uh Oh received generally favorable reviews from critics. At Metacritic, which assigns a normalized rating out of 100 to reviews from mainstream publications, the album received an average score of 80 based on 5 reviews.

In the AllMusic review, staff member Donelson praised the album's "quietly haunting, dramatic character" that was "born of necessity."

== Awards ==
The album was a Juno Award nominee for Adult Alternative Album of the Year at the Juno Awards of 2026.

"House on Fire" was shortlisted for the 2026 SOCAN Polaris Song Prize.

== Track listing ==
Uh Oh track listing
No.	Title	Length
1.	"Silencio" (with November Ultra)	4:22
2.	"Peter and the Wolf" (with Anachnid)	3:36
3.	"The Wandering" (with MARO)	3:21
4.	"Choir in the Wires"	2:42
5.	"Uh Oh" (with Charlotte Oleena)	3:49
6.	"The Lonely Lights" (with La Force)	2:55
7.	"Ami Imaginaire" (with Klô Pelgag)	4:10
8.	"Postcards" (with Hohnen Ford)	1:14
9.	"House on Fire" (with Martha Wainwright)	4:14
10.	"Gordon in the Willows" (with Charlotte Cardin)	3:55
11.	"Ça Va" (with Solann)	3:17
Total length:		38:35

== Charts ==
Chart performance for Uh Oh
Chart (2025)	Peak position
Canadian Albums (Billboard)	13
Belgian Albums (Wallonia)	103
