= II (Cursed album) =

Studio album by Cursed
- Released: January 25, 2005
- Genre: Crust punk, sludge metal
- Length: 34:14
- Label: Goodfellow Records
- Producer: Cursed

Cursed chronology
| I (2003) | II (2005) | III: Architects of Troubled Sleep (2008) |

Professional ratings
Review scores
| Source | Rating |
|---|---|
| Aversion Online | 8/10 stars |
| Decoymusic | 4.5/5 stars |
| Lambgoat | 9/10 stars |
| Popmatters | 8/10 stars |
| Punknews.org | 5/5 stars |
| Scenepointblank | 9/10 stars |

II is the second studio album by Canadian hardcore punk band Cursed. It was released on January 25, 2005 through Goodfellows Records. It was critically praised by most reviewers.

== Track listing ==
All tracks are written by Cursed

II
| No. | Title | Length |
|---|---|---|
| 1. | "Intro/Fatalist" | 3:56 |
| 2. | "Reparations" | 2:28 |
| 3. | "R.I.P" | 1:41 |
| 4. | "Head of the Baptist" | 3:16 |
| 5. | "The Void" | 4:15 |
| 6. | "Two" | 1:20 |
| 7. | "Old Money" | 2:08 |
| 8. | "Clocked In, Punched Out" | 1:33 |
| 9. | "Model Home Invasion" | 6:56 |
| 10. | "Hell Comes Home" | 2:59 |
| 11. | "Outro" | 3:47 |

== Personnel ==
=== Band ===
- Chris Colohan – Vocals, composer, Group Member, Layout Design
- Christian McMaster – Guitar
- T. Piriano – Bass
- Radwan Moumneh – Guitar
- Mike Maxymuik – Drums, Piano

=== Production ===
- João Carvalho – Mastering
- Rudy Rempel – Audio Engineer, engineer
- Ian Blurton – Audio Production, Mixing
- Audio production and production by Cursed
