= Plants and Animals (EP) =

2003 EP by Plants and Animals

EP by Plants and Animals
- Released: 2003
- Genre: indie rock
- Length: 51:44
- Label: Ships at Night Records

Plants and Animals chronology
Plants and Animals (2003)	With/Avec (2007)

Plants and Animals is the 2003 debut EP by Plants and Animals. The band describes its first release as "An early epic instrumental folk [that] has little in common with their later work, beyond tight-arse musicianship."

== Track listing ==
1. "Boyfriends and Girlfriends" – 15:49
2. "Jacques ..." – 7:15
3. "Thundergongs" – 9:32
4. "Working Man" – 11:41
5. "... Making Us Weaker" – 7:27

This is reference 1. This is reference 2.
