= Parc Avenue (album) =

Studio album by Plants and Animals
- Released: February 26, 2008
- Genre: Indie rock
- Label: Secret City Records

Plants and Animals chronology
With/Avec (2007)	Parc Avenue (2008)	La La Land (2010)

Professional ratings
Review scores
Source	Rating
Pitchfork Media	(8.0/10)
PopMatters	(9/10)

Parc Avenue is the first full-length album by Canadian indie rock band Plants and Animals, released February 26, 2008 on Secret City Records.

The album was a nominee for the 2008 Polaris Music Prize.

In 2018 the band released a 10th anniversary reissue of the album, featuring several unreleased early demo tracks as bonus features.

== Track listing ==
1. "Bye Bye Bye"
2. "Good Friend"
3. "Faerie Dance"
4. "Feedback in the Field"
5. "À l'orée des bois"
6. "New Kind of Love"
7. "Early in the Morning"
8. "Mercy"
9. "Sea Shanty"
10. "Keep It Real"
11. "Guru"

=== 2018 reissue bonus tracks ===
1. "EYB EYB EYB"
2. "Bar frontière"
3. "Garden Party"
4. "Towels"
5. "Wall of Pain"
6. "Professor"
7. "Facecloth"
8. "Shitstorm"
