= Eye Weekly =

Former free weekly newspaper published in Toronto, Ontario, Canada

- Type: Weekly city magazine
- Format: Tabloid
- Owner: Torstar
- Publisher: Laas Turnbull
- Editor-in-chief: Laas Turnbull
- Founded: 1991
- Ceased publication: 2011
- Headquarters: Toronto, Ontario, Canada
- ISSN: 1192-6074

Eye Weekly was a free weekly newspaper published in Toronto, Ontario, Canada. It was owned by Torstar, the parent company of the Toronto Star, and was published by their Star Media Group until its final issue on May 5, 2011. The following week, Torstar launched a successor publication, The Grid.

== History ==
Eye Weekly began publishing on October 10, 1991. The content was first posted online via Usenet in March 1994, and its website launched in October 1994, becoming one of the first publications to put its content online. It had an audited circulation of 120,000 copies, as of a 2005-2007 report.

== See also ==
- List of newspapers in Canada
