= ...And the Saga Continues =

Canadian hardcore punk band formed 2000

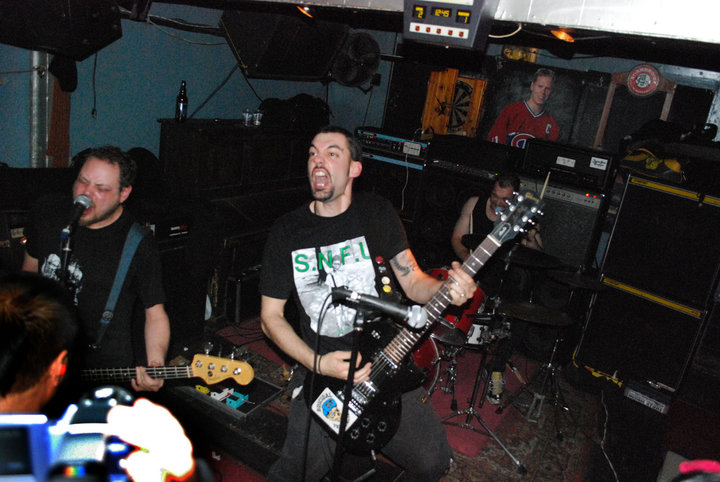

Background information
- Origin: Montreal, Quebec, Canada
- Genres: Hardcore punk rock
- Years active: 2000–2010
- Labels: Contempt For Humanity Records, Fuck the Bullshit Records
- Spinoff of: All the Answers, Hard Charger, The Forum, Jon Creeden & The Flying Hellfish, Chris Snelgrove and the Last Mile, Conditions Apply, Psychic Raccoon, Hold a Grudge
- Past members: Jonah Aspler; Truffle Simmons; Matt Dillitzer; Chris Ross
- Website: andthesagacontinues.bandcamp.com

...And the Saga Continues was a Canadian hardcore punk rock band from Montreal, Quebec.

== History ==
The founding members of ...And the Saga Continues were Jonah Aspler on bass, Truffle Simmons on guitar, Matt "The Fridge" Dillitzer on drums, and Chris Ross on vocals. Aspler and Simmons had previously played together in late 90s seminal Quebec punk band All the Answers, alongside other musicians Chris Snelgrove and Mike Sokolyk. Simmons eventually left All the Answers to begin another band, One Step Away, with Dillitzer and Ross. When Aspler later joined One Step Away, the band changed its name to ...And the Saga Continues, shifting its approach to a faster and more aggressive hardcore sound.

As influences, ...And the Saga Continues cited: Minor Threat, Suicidal Tendencies, Bad Brains, D.R.I, Agnostic Front and SNFU. Over the course of their history, the band released four full-length albums as well as EPs and compilation contributions, toured internationally and garnered critical acclaim. They were described by Exclaim! magazine as holding an "incredibly D.I.Y. standpoint, and [a] fearless nature to do and say whatever the hell they want, no matter how crude".

The band recorded its first album 'Braust Till You Die' in 2000 with Ryan "Ron" Battistuzzi and toured to promote the album. Shortly before the band's East-Coast US tour, Ross left the band with Aspler taking over vocal duties.

In winter of 2001, the band recorded their follow up album 'The Sinister 3' with Radwan Ghazi Moumneh and continued to tour extensively. The album was well received and described by Equalizing Distort as "amped up fast hardcore played in a power violence style".

In late 2003, they recorded the 'You Can't Stop The 3rd' album with Rene Garcia (of The Brains and Vulgar Deli) which was released on Contempt For Humanity Records. The album received positive reviews, and was described by maximumrocknroll as "quality hardcore all the way". The band toured in support of the album alongside label mates Hands of Death and continued to play live shows.

In 2008, the band recorded again with Ryan Battistuzzi and released its 'Making Enemies and Burning Bridges' album on Fuck the Bullshit Records. The album was received positively and praised for its "pummeling attack of ferocious hardcore [that] speaks for itself.

Since the band's discontinuation, its members have continued to be active. In 2008, Simmons joined hardcore punk band Hold a Grudge (Insurgence Records) as its bass player. In 2009, Simmons and Dillitzer formed another hardcore band called The Forum. Aspler has played in a number of bands including, starting in 2012, Fredericton, NB's Hard Charger. As part of a 2015 tour, Aspler performed with both Jon Creeden & The Flying Hellfish, and with Chris Snelgrove and the Last Mile. Aspler currently plays with the band Conditions Apply, and with Psychic Raccoon whose song Smokey Mountain was recently included on a compilation album put out by Cuchabata Records who released the band's first album Beaver Skull (2021).

== Discography ==
=== Full-length albums ===
- 2000: Braust Till You Die
- 2002: The Sinister 3
- 2003: You Can't Stop the 3rd (Contempt for Humanity Records)
- 2008: Making Enemies & Burning Bridges (Fuck the Bullshit Records)

=== EPs ===
- 2004: Heads Up Cause We're Droppin' Some Shit - Split 7 inch with Hands of Death (Contempt For Humanity Records)
- 2005: Ferocious (Fuck the Bullshit Records)

=== Other contributions ===
- 2004: Montreal Spirit, a DTC Family Compilation - The Ballad of the Bugs (Dare to Care Records)
- 2006: Crush Your Canadian Idols - This One's For You Dickheads (Capital Kill Productions)
- 2006: The Battle Must Go On! - The True Pleasure Of Life (Fight the Mentality Records)
