= Plants and Animals =

Canadian indie-rock band

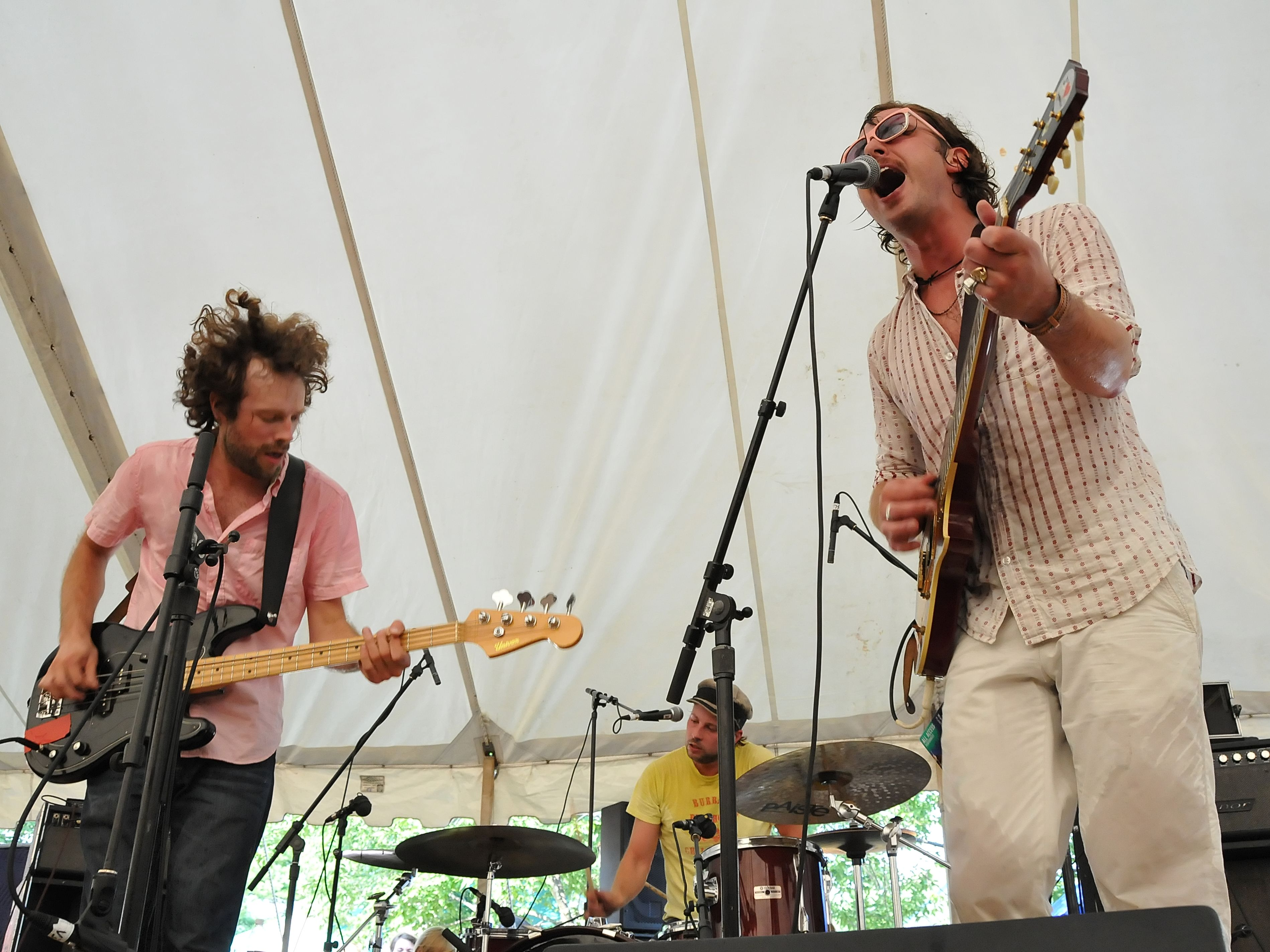
- Plants and Animals, July 2007

Background information
- Origin: Montreal, Quebec, Canada
- Genres: Indie rock
- Years active: 2003–present
- Label: Secret City
- Members: Warren Spicer: guitar, vocals Matthew Woodley: drums, vocals Nicolas Basque: guitar, bass, keyboards, vocals
- Website: plantsandanimals.ca

Plants and Animals are a Canadian indie-rock band from Montreal (featuring two members originally from Nova Scotia) which comprises guitarist-vocalists Warren Spicer and Nic Basque and drummer-vocalist Matthew Woody Woodley. Spicer and Woodley began playing together in various projects when still in their teens, joining forces with Basque upon moving to Montreal in the early 2000s. They emerged on the international scene in 2008 with their debut full-length album Parc Avenue, released on Secret City Records.

== Career ==
Plants and Animals' self-titled EP was released in 2003 via Ships at Night Records. In the fall of 2007, Plants and Animals released the four-song with/avec EP.

Their full-length debut Parc Avenue was released on February 26, 2008 in Canada and on March 25, 2008 in the United States. It received much early attention for garnering a high 8.0/10 review from popular website Pitchfork. The album was recorded entirely on analogue tape and features string parts by Sarah Neufeld of Arcade Fire. It was shortlisted for the 2008 Polaris Music Prize, and was nominated for a 2009 Juno Award for Alternative Album of the Year; the band were also nominated for New Group of the Year.

The band released their second LP, titled La La Land, on April 20, 2010. The album was recorded in both The Treatment Room in the band's hometown of Montreal and La Frette Studios outside of Paris, France.

Their third album, The End of That, was released on February 28, 2012. The trio spent nearly a year preparing a catalogue of songs before entering the studio.

Waltzed in from the Rumbling, their fourth full-length, was released on April 29, 2016. In November they followed up with Passed Out from the Waltzing, an EP of B-sides from the album.

In 2018 they released an expanded 10th anniversary edition of Parc Avenue, featuring several bonus tracks.

Their fifth album, The Jungle, was released in October 2020.

In 2022 Basque released the album Le soleil et la mer with his side project Bibi Club. In 2024, Spicer released an album with the side project Unessential Oils. Woodley frequently records and tours with Canadian singer-songwriter Basia Bulat.

== Discography ==
=== Studio albums ===
- Parc Avenue (2008)
- La La Land (2010)
- The End of That (2012)
- Waltzed in from the Rumbling (2016)
- The Jungle (2020)

=== EPs ===
- Plants and Animals EP (2003)
- With/Avec EP (2007)
- Passed Out from the Waltzing (2016)

=== Singles ===
| Year | Song | Chart peak | Album |
| Year | Song | CAN Alt | Album |
|---|---|---|---|
| 2012 | "Lightshow" | 29 | The End of That |
| 2012 | "Why & Why" | 36 | The End of That |
"—" denotes a release that did not chart.

== Appearances in the media ==
Plants and Animals' single "Bye Bye Bye" was available for free download on iTunes for a week in late August 2009. The song was featured on season three episode 13 of the TV show Chuck.

"The End of That" plays at the end credits for Joe Swanberg's film Drinking Buddies.

"Lightshow" was featured on the soundtrack for The Lifeguard.
