= Wooden Arms =

Studio album by Patrick Watson
- Released: April 28, 2009
- Recorded: 2008
- Genre: Dream pop, psychedelic folk
- Length: 45:12
- Label: Secret City
- Producer: Patrick Watson

Patrick Watson chronology
Close to Paradise (2007)	Wooden Arms (2009)	Adventures in Your Own Backyard (2012)

Professional ratings
Review scores
Source	Rating
Bande à part	(8.6/10)
NME	(9/10)
Pitchfork Media	(3.3/10)
The Guardian	3/5 stars
Wunderkammer	(Mixed)

Wooden Arms is the third album by Patrick Watson, released April 28, 2009 on Secret City Records. The album's first single, "Tracy's Waters", was released on March 5 and the group performed a new song, "Beijing", on CBC Radio's Q radio show on April 6. "Fireweed" was also released as a single and a music video was filmed, which features both live action and animation.

The album was nominated for the 2009 Polaris Music Prize, an award that Watson won in 2007 with the sophomore release, Close to Paradise.

The song "Big Bird in a Small Cage" was chosen as the Starbucks iTunes Pick of the Week for August 25, 2009.

The song "Beijing" was inspired by the movie Being John Malkovich, and the idea of finding oneself in someone else's life in Beijing.

The song "Summer Sleeps" (an iTunes and Vinyl bonus track) was used in the TV Show "Continuum" Season 1, episode 9.

== Personnel ==
Guest musicians on the album include Lhasa de Sela, Katie Moore and Jace Lasek.

== Track listing ==
No.	Title	Length
1.	"Fireweed"	3:35
2.	"Tracy's Waters"	3:47
3.	"Beijing"	4:06
4.	"Wooden Arms"	3:08
5.	"Hommage"	2:04
6.	"Traveling Salesman"	3:42
7.	"Big Bird in a Small Cage"	4:03
8.	"Down at the Beach"	5:18
9.	"Man Like You"	4:11
10.	"Where the Wild Things Are"	3:52
11.	"Machinery of the Heavens"	7:26

Bonus tracks
No.	Title	Length
12.	"Hearts in the Park"
13.	"Summer Sleeps" (iTunes bonus track)

== Charts and certifications ==
Chart	Peak position
Belgian Albums Chart (Flanders)	22
Dutch Albums Chart	34
French Albums Chart	104

== Certification ==
Country	Certification
Canada (Music Canada)	Gold
