= Suuns =

Canadian rock band

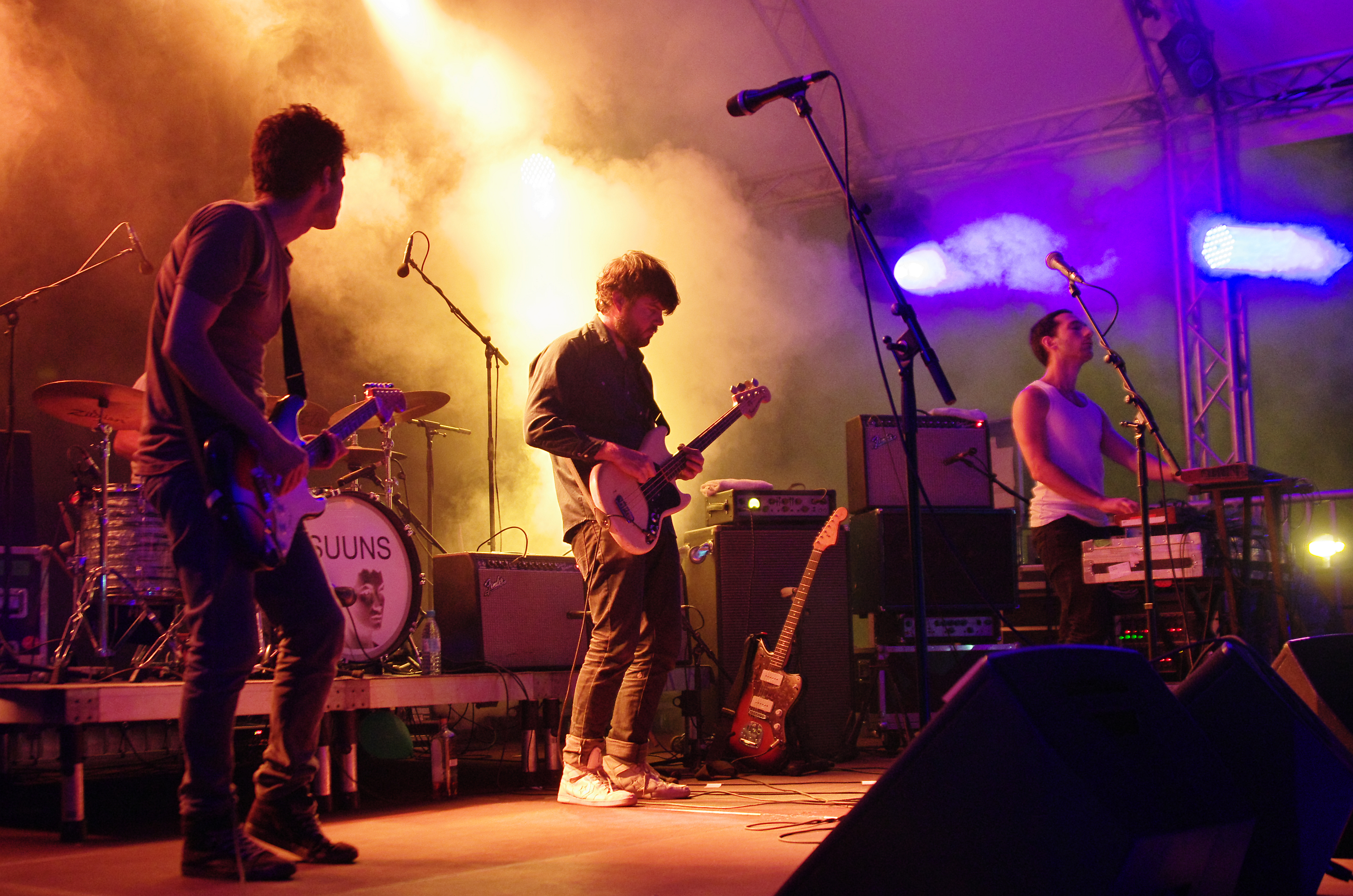
- Suuns performing in 2013

Background information
- Origin: Montreal, Quebec, Canada
- Genres: Krautrock, neo-psychedelia, art punk
- Years active: 2007–present
- Labels: Joyful Noise; Secretly Canadian; Secret City; White Wabbit
- Members: Ben Shemie; Liam O'Neill; Joseph Yarmush
- Past members: Max Henry
- Website: suuns.net

Suuns (/suːns/) is a Canadian rock band from Montreal. It was formed in mid-2007 when vocalist and guitarist Ben Shemie and guitarist and bassist Joe Yarmush got together to make some beats which quickly evolved into a few songs. The duo was soon joined by drummer Liam O'Neill and bassist and keyboardist Max Henry to complete the original line-up. The band signed to Secretly Canadian in 2010. Since 2018, Suuns saw the departure of Henry as an official member (he continues to record in the studio) to pursue a scholastic path, and in 2020 they officially signed with Joyful Noise Recordings with their 2020 output of Fiction, followed by their 2021 LP The Witness.

== History ==
In 2009, Suuns entered Breakglass Studios with Jace Lasek of the Besnard Lakes co-producing and engineering, and recorded their first album, Zeroes QC. Upon its release in 2010, a reviewer of The New York Times said that it offered a "rigorous strategy behind every gorgeous onslaught." The album appeared on the !Earshot National Top 50 Chart. Suuns toured the East Coast in the summer with Parlovr and further established their fan base during their fall tour with Land of Talk and The Besnard Lakes.

Suuns spent much of 2011 performing in the U.S., Europe and Canada including New York's CMJ, SXSW, Primavera Sound, and over twelve other festivals. They also headlined a Canadian tour and co-headlined a North American tour with PS I Love You. During a rare couple weeks off in Montreal, Suuns decided to take a risk to experiment and create two new, unusual songs. "Red Song" and "Bambi" were extended pieces unlike Suuns' previous works.

In 2012, they were the curators for the Sonic City Festival in Belgium. Other festival performances included the National's ATP Festival, London's Village Underground, and Paris's Point Ephemere. The band also spent much of the year preparing to release their second album, Images Du Futur, which they announced in November, and gearing up for the busy year ahead. They finished off 2012 with a month-long tour from mid-November through mid-December.

The band kicked off the year with a January release of new music video "Edie's Dream" and a February release of the video for "2020". Their second album, Images Du Futur, was released by Secretly Canadian on March 5 (except in Canada on Secret City Records) in the middle of Suuns' international three-month tour featuring We Are Wolves and Plants and Animals. The Line of Best Fit describes the album: "Images Du Futur is exciting in a way that few albums manage to be, dangerous and compelling like a first cigarette or fumbled sexual encounter, and nothing here quite seems real: these ten tracks exist in a half-light, a nocturnal fog a step removed from lucid thought. And a long, long way from anything routine." In June 2013, the album was longlisted for the 2013 Polaris Music Prize.

Suuns and Jerusalem in My Heart released their self-titled album worldwide on April 14, 2015, and announced tour and festival dates. An Exclaim! interview states, "Recorded over a week in November 2012, the tracks mixed the strengths of both bands: the Eastern modes and drones plus the Arabic vocal delivered by Moumneh, and the keyboard arpeggios and incisive guitars of Suuns' Shemie and Joe Yarmush."

In May 2015, the band began recording Hold/Still in Dallas, Texas with producer John Congleton. During the three-week recording session, Congleton encouraged the band to capture flawless live takes of each track, without use of overdubs. The album includes songs that the band had been working on for several years but never showed up on previous albums, including "Translate" and "Infinity". It was released on April 15, 2016, via Secretly Canadian.

In November 2016, the band also curated their own program during the tenth Anniversary Edition of Le Guess Who? Festival in Utrecht, The Netherlands. This curated program included performances by amongst others Pauline Oliveros, Alessandro Cortini, Patrick Higgins, and Jerusalem in My Heart.

On October 30, 2020, the band released their EP, Fiction, via Secret City and Joyful Noise Recordings.

On September 3, 2021, the band released The Witness through Joyful Noise Recordings internationally and on Secret City Records in Canada. It is the follow-up full-length to 2018's Felt. On June 9, 2021, The Fader premiered the first single and video for "Witness Protection". Pitchfork hailed it as a breakthrough album for the group.

O'Neill appears on Charlotte Cornfield's album Highs in the Minuses and on Cedric Noel's LP Hangtime.

The band released a collaborative album with Kelman Duran in April 2026.

== Discography ==
Studio albums

- Zeroes QC (2010), Secretly Canadian
- Images Du Futur (2013), Secretly Canadian
- Hold/Still (2016), Secretly Canadian
- Felt (2018), Secretly Canadian
- The Witness (2021), Joyful Noise Recordings and Secret City
- The Breaks (2024), Joyful Noise Recordings and Secret City

EP

- Fiction (2020), Joyful Noise Recordings and Secret City

Singles

- "Bambi" b/w "Red Song" (2011), Secretly Canadian

Collaborative albums

- Suuns and Jerusalem in My Heart (2015, with Jerusalem in My Heart)
- Suuns & Kelman Duran (2026, with Kelman Duran)
