= Drinking Buddies =

2013 film by Joe Swanberg

- Theatrical release poster
- Directed by: Joe Swanberg
- Written by: Joe Swanberg
- Produced by: Andrea Roa; Joe Swanberg; Alicia Van Couvering; Paul Bernon; Sam Slater
- Starring: Olivia Wilde; Jake Johnson; Anna Kendrick; Ron Livingston
- Cinematography: Ben Richardson
- Edited by: Joe Swanberg
- Production company: Burn Later Productions
- Distributed by: Magnolia Pictures
- Release dates: March 13, 2013 (South by Southwest); August 23, 2013 (United States)
- Running time: 90 minutes
- Country: United States
- Language: English
- Budget: $1 million
- Box office: $343,341

Drinking Buddies is a 2013 American comedy-drama film written, directed and edited by Joe Swanberg, and starring Olivia Wilde, Jake Johnson, Anna Kendrick and Ron Livingston. The film is about two co-workers at a craft brewery in Chicago.

The film premiered at the 2013 South by Southwest Film Festival, and also screened at Maryland Film Festival 2013.

== Plot ==
Kate and Luke work at Chicago craft brewery Revolution Brewing. She does marketing and public relations, he works in production. Sharing the same sense of goofy humor, they seem perfect for each other but they are both in relationships with other people. Kate is with Chris, and Luke is with Jill. Jill is a nice, practical girl, and Chris is an introvert. Jill wants to get married, which Luke promises to talk about soon.

One day, Luke and Kate are drinking with co-workers, and Jill and Chris also show up. Chris invites the other couple to join him and Kate on a trip to his cottage. On a hike on the trip, Jill and Chris kiss.

Luke and Kate spend the whole trip drinking and staying up late together, later having a bonfire one night. Kate dares Luke to go skinny dipping, stripping and running into the lake.

When the couples return home, Chris realizes his and Kate's differences and breaks up with her. Kate insists the whole brewery crew go out the next evening for drinks to celebrate her 'singleness'. That night she ends up sleeping with co-worker, Dave. When Luke hears, he is angry at them both, spending the whole day snapping at them, but later apologizes.

Jill decides to go away for a week with some college friends. During this trip, Luke and Kate go out for dinner and fall asleep together on the couch. He helps her pack up her old apartment and move the next day. At the end of the day, he falls asleep on the bed. Kate joins him.

The next morning, Luke and Kate keep moving, planning to have a celebratory dinner when they are done. He cuts his hand badly while helping move a couch, and she is squeamish about the blood and unhelpful. An impatient driver, blocked by the moving van, starts a fight with Luke. Kate calls Dave and another co-worker to help finish the move. Dave invites Kate out for drinks, and she agrees instead of dining with Luke. He is annoyed and they argue.

Returning home, Luke finds Jill has come home early, and she is crying. She sees his injuries and while cleaning him up, confesses to kissing Chris while at the cottage. She tells him how guilty she feels about it, and that she really loves him and wants to marry him. Luke forgives Jill and lets her know that he still loves her and wants to marry her too. The next day at work Kate and Luke awkwardly interact and then eventually sit together at lunch. They offer one another bits of their lunch, Kate refusing the banana and he tosses it, their way of saying they will remain friends. They smile and share a beer.

== Cast ==
- Olivia Wilde as Kate
- Jake Johnson as Luke
- Anna Kendrick as Jill
- Ron Livingston as Chris
- Ti West as Dave
- Jason Sudeikis as Gene Dentler (credited as Gene Dentler playing "Himself")
- Joe Swanberg as Angry Man in the Car

== Production ==
The idea to set the film in a brewery came when director Joe Swanberg received a brewing set-up as a birthday present. According to Swanberg,

I wanted to do something about Craft Beer [independent breweries] and set in the Craft Beer world but also I was inspired by Bob & Carol & Ted & Alice, a Paul Mazursky movie. Just to tell a complicated adult [story] that was funny, that managed to remain funny even though it was getting into serious, interesting things.

The dialogue was improvised. Instead of a script, the actors received outlines which covered the major plot points and were told each day what had to happen in that day's scenes. Relying heavily on improvisation is a key feature of the Mumblecore film movement. He said, "knowing that the structure was already pretty heavily in place, it was about letting the actors own their characters, and have a big say in the clothes that they wore, and in the interactions that they have with each other." He added: "The improv was used to mainly make the middle of the movie more complicated, and less predictable than a typical romantic comedy would be." Swanberg also stated "They need to be listening to each other and reacting honestly and I need to be paying really close attention because there’s not a script to fall back on. The goal of doing it that way is to keep everybody engaged and create situations that feel fun and natural".

Filming took place in Chicago, Illinois in July 2012. The film was shot in an actual brewery, called Revolution, where one of the female brewers named Kate was the basis for Wilde's character. The actors actually drank real beer during the filming and even did real work for the brewing company. Wilde would later comment that the cast was "hammered the entire movie."

The film concludes with an open ending with Swanberg stating "it's hard for me, knowing how uncertain the world is, to put a certain, definite ending on a movie. I feel like I'm hopefully hinting that there's a resolution without it being cemented down, or hammering you over the head with it."

Drinking Buddies has music supervised by Chris Swanson, Grant Manship and Kathleen Cook of Jagjaguwar. The soundtrack features Jag artists Foxygen and Richard Youngs, The Amazing and Richard Swift, as well as Plants & Animals, Here We Go Magic, Phèdre, and other additional artists.

Olivia Wilde said getting nude for this movie was all her idea. There was no script for the film, only Swanberg as its captain, and Wilde told her director she wanted to skinny dip because "it felt so incredibly organic to that moment."

== Reception ==
Drinking Buddies received positive reviews from critics. As of September 2021, the film holds an 84% approval rating on the review aggregation website Rotten Tomatoes, based on 122 reviews with an average rating of 6.9/10. The site's consensus reads, "Smart, funny, and powered by fine performances from Olivia Wilde and Jake Johnson, Drinking Buddies offers a bittersweet slice of observational comedy." On Metacritic the film has a weighted average score of 71 out of 100, based on 32 critics, indicating "general favorable reviews".

A. O. Scott of The New York Times remarked "Mr. Swanberg’s camera weaves through bodies at rest, at work and at the bar in no particular hurry, and his script captures the idioms of men and women who are equally inclined to waste words and to say very little. But the busy tedium of their lives is given shape and direction by the skill of the cast and by the precision of the director’s eye, ear and editing instincts."

Upon the film's UK release, Peter Bradshaw gave the film three stars out of five, calling it "a lo-fi relationship drama that is interesting, if unevenly presented...an intriguing and distinctive story, soberly told"; according to Bradshaw, "Swanberg interestingly shows how booze loosens them up, lowers their inhibitions, and yet blurs their emotional reactions, in the process weirdly muting and endlessly deferring the sexual drama." Quentin Tarantino named it one of the top 10 movies of the year in October 2013.
