= Quest for Fire (band) =

Canadian psychedelic rock band

- Origin: Toronto, Ontario, Canada
- Genres: Psychedelic rock
- Years active: 2007–2013
- Labels: Tee Pee
- Formerly of: The Deadly Snakes; Cursed; Comet Control
- Past members: Andrew Moszynski; Chad Ross; Mike Maxymuik; Josh Bauman

Quest for Fire was a Canadian psychedelic rock band based in Toronto, with members Andrew Moszynski, Chad Ross, Mike Maxymuik and Josh Bauman. Moszynski and Ross were previously in the band The Deadly Snakes, while Maxymuik was formerly in the band Cursed and Bauman was previously in the band No No Zero.

== History ==
Quest for Fire formed in 2007 in Toronto. They jammed and practised together for about a year before beginning to perform locally. In 2008, they set out on a cross-Canada tour, including a spot opening for Black Mountain. In 2008, their single, "Storyboard", appeared on the !Earshot National Top 50 chart.

The band released their self-titled debut album of six extended stoner-rock tracks in 2009 on The Storyboard Label and Tee Pee Records, to mixed reviews.

Quest for Fire's second album, Lights from Paradise, somewhat more contemplative with some orchestral music in the mix, followed in 2010. The single "Set Out Alone" reached No. 1 on CBC Radio 3's The R3-30 charts the week of November 13, 2010.

On January 1, 2013, the band disbanded. They performed a final gig in February 2013 in their hometown of Toronto, Ontario.

== Discography ==
- Quest for Fire (2009)
- Lights from Paradise (2010)
