= Patrick Watson (musician) =

American-born Canadian singer-songwriter

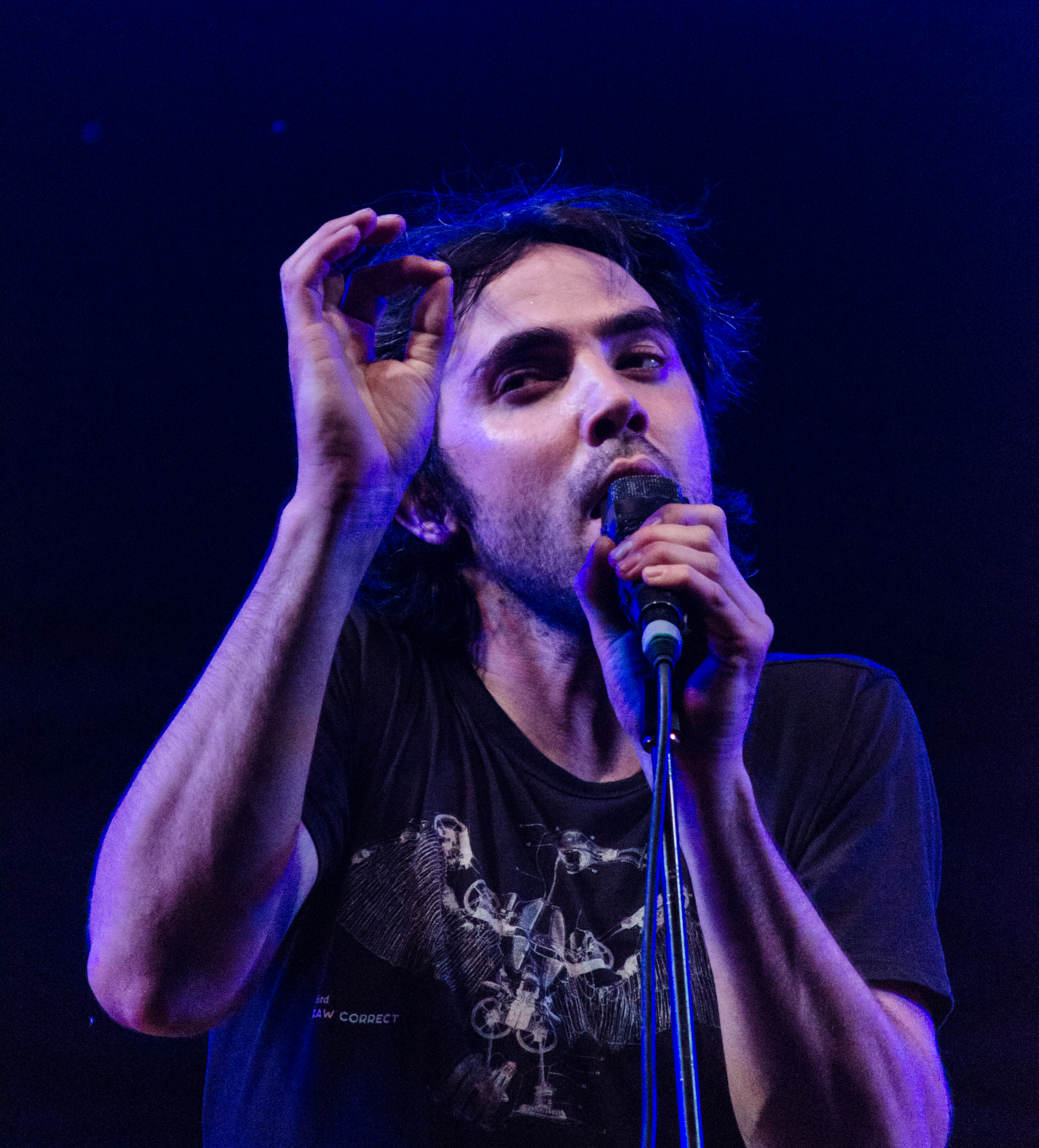
- Watson at the Winnipeg Folk Festival in 2013

Background information
- Born: October 8, 1979 (age 46)
- Origin: Lancaster, California
- Instruments: Vocals, piano, guitar, organ, accordion
- Label: Secret City Records
- Website: Official website

Patrick Watson (born October 8, 1979 in Lancaster, California) is a Canadian singer-songwriter from Montreal, Quebec, who has formed a band also named Patrick Watson, whose blend of cabaret pop and classical music influences with indie rock has been compared to Rufus Wainwright, Andrew Bird, Nick Drake, Jeff Buckley and Pink Floyd for its experimental musicianship. Patrick Watson's album Close to Paradise was awarded the Polaris Music Prize in 2007.

His 2010 song "Je te laisserai des mots" (lit. 'I will leave you some words') has amassed more than 1 billion streams on Spotify, the first French-language song to do so.

== Early history ==
Born to Canadian parents and raised in Hudson, Quebec, Watson attended Lower Canada College. While living in Hudson, Watson worked as a pool and hot tub water analyst at Piscines et Spas Hudson. He studied music at Vanier College in Montreal.

== Solo career ==
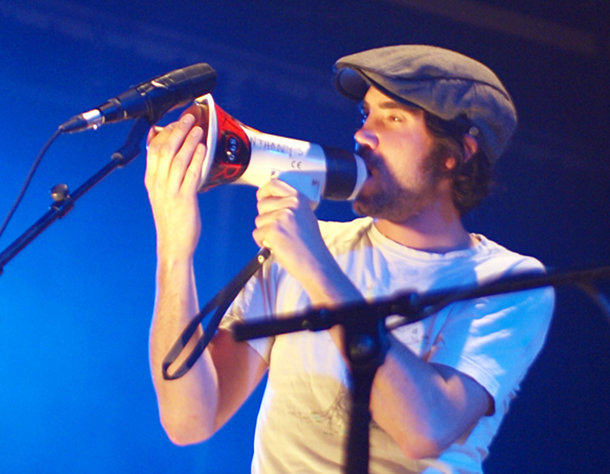
Watson singing through a megaphone, used to warp and loop his voice, during a performance in 2009.

Watson co-wrote and performed on several songs on the Cinematic Orchestra's 2007 album Ma Fleur including the opening track, "To Build a Home". His "Missing Home" remix of Champion's "Guy Doune", from Champion's 2006 album The Remix Album, reached Number 1 on CBC Radio 3's R3-30 chart in early 2007.

Watson has toured with several artists, including John Cale, the Cinematic Orchestra, Cold War Kids, Amon Tobin, the Dears, Feist and James Brown. He was Starbucks "Pick of the week" free download in September 2009 and again in June 2015.

== Patrick Watson (band) ==
Patrick Watson (band)
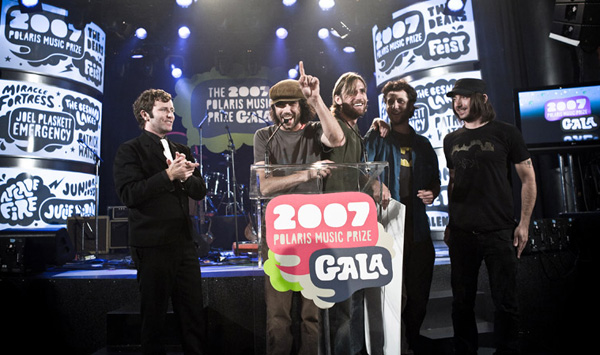
- Patrick Watson at the 2007 Polaris Music Prize gala.

Background information
- Origin: Montreal, Quebec, Canada
- Label: Secret City
- Members: Patrick Watson; Mishka Stein; Joe Grass; Andrew Barr
- Past members: Simon Angell; Robbie Kuster; Evan Tighe
- Website: www.patrickwatson.net

After creating music and releasing albums in various styles, Watson formed a group with guitarist Simon Angell, percussionist Robbie Kuster, and bassist Mishka Stein. The band has performed with artists like James Brown, the Dears, Philip Glass and the Stills.

In an interview, Watson said regarding his band:

So we as a band are called Patrick Watson. How it started was that originally, some years ago, we were asked to do some music to accompany a book of photography. Having built a CD to go with all these images we thought it would be fun to do it live and it worked really well and people freaked. We didn't really think we were gonna be a band at that point but over a period of five or six years we got to a point where it became very difficult to change the name. It was difficult to find a name that suited us especially as we had such an eclectic music style. The second album was a kind of middle point, and now here we are at this third album which is much more song orientated.

The band received a nomination for New Artist of the Year at the 2007 Juno Awards. In the same year, Watson and Caroline Dhavernas received a Genie Award nomination for Best Original Song at the 27th Genie Awards in 2007, for the song "Trace-moi" from the film The Beautiful Beast (La Belle bête).

On July 10, 2007, Close to Paradise made the shortlist for the 2007 Polaris Music Prize. It was announced as the winning album on September 24. Their 2009 album Wooden Arms was a finalist for the 2009 prize.

The band is well known for using unusual objects to make sounds in their music; for example, Watson "played" a bicycle in the studio for the song "Beijing". and percussionist Robbie Kuster used two spoons to create a tremolo picking effect on an acoustic guitar in the opening of "Man Like You".

After several years of touring internationally—including shows in regions as distant as Beijing with Split Works in 2010—the group returned to Montreal in 2011 to record their fourth studio album, Adventures in Your Own Backyard, which was released internationally in April 2012. The album marks a subtle shift in the band's style to a simpler and less experimental sound, described by one critic as "a dreamy bath of chamber-pop and fancy cabaret, less clacky without the kitchen-utensil or bike-wheel percussion of Wooden Arms and slightly more grounded than Close to Paradise". Prior to the album's release, the band performed at South by Southwest in Austin, Texas, where they were named by Rolling Stone magazine as one of the 25 "can't-miss acts" of the festival. The band toured in support of the new album from April to July 2012.

In September 2013, Watson created a T-shirt for the Yellow Bird Project to raise money for Cape Farewell, an organization which aims to instigate cultural awareness of climate change.

Love Songs for Robots, the band's fifth studio album, was released on May 12, 2015.

Wave, the band's sixth album, was released on October 18, 2019. This album marked a departure of the band's longtime percussionist Robbie Kuster. Kuster, along with bassist Mishka Stein, created a new musical act, Black Legary. They also are part of another new act, Colonel Sun.

Watson announced a new album, Uh Oh, a collaborative album that features artists like Charlotte Cardin, Ariel Engle, Martha Wainwright, Klô Pelgag and others. The album was released on September 26, 2025. It was a Juno Award nominee for Adult Alternative Album of the Year at the Juno Awards of 2026, and the song "House on Fire", a collaboration with Martha Wainwright, was shortlisted for the 2026 SOCAN Polaris Song Prize.

== In popular culture ==
The song "The Great Escape" was featured on episode 16 of the third season of Grey's Anatomy, which aired on February 15, 2007; on a Tropicana Canada commercial; in the movie One Week starring Joshua Jackson; in the 2010 movie The High Cost of Living; in the season 2 finale of World of Jenks; and in the 2008 movie Mommy Is at the Hairdresser's (Maman est chez le coiffeur). The song was also used for the finale of the television show ReGenesis. Also, the song "Noisy Sunday" was featured on the season 3 premiere of the TV show The Walking Dead. The song was also featured on the 2012 indie movie Struck by Lightning. The songs "Big Bird in a Small Cage", "Into Giants", "Blackwind" and "Lighthouse" were featured in the 2013 film The F Word. The song "Good Morning Mr. Wolf" was featured on season 3 episode 10 of Ray Donovan in 2015.

In 2008, Watson composed the soundtrack for the French-Canadian film It's Not Me, I Swear! (C'est pas moi, je le jure!). The soundtrack features collaborations by Elie Dupuis and the star of the movie, who was 12 years old at the time.

The song "Lighthouse" from the album Adventures in Your Own Backyard was featured in the TV shows American Idol, Haven, The Blacklist and The Disappearance in addition to the film Yves Saint Laurent.

The song "Words in the Fire" was sampled in the 2012 hit single of the Nigerian hip hop artist MI ABAGA, titled "Ashes" in memory of four students who were killed in an unprovoked attack that same year.

The song "that home" appeared in episode five of season two of the American series Suits.

The song "Lighthouse" is featured in an Ikea advert in the UK.

"To Build a Home" was featured in the 2016 video game Steep.

In 2017, the song "To Build a Home" was featured in the season 5 finale of the hit Netflix original series Orange Is the New Black.

On 1 January 2018, the song "Love Songs for Robots" featured in season 3 episode 4 of the Netflix drama series Lovesick.

The song "To Build a Home" was also featured in the end of the January 23, 2018 episode of This Is Us, at the end of the episode.

In 2020, the song "Here Comes the River" was used at the end of episode 6 of The Walking Dead: World Beyond.

At the 2026 Winter Olympics, the British figure skating pair Anastasia Vaipan-Law and Luke Digby performed to "Lighthouse" in their short program.

== Discography ==
Studio albums

- Waterproof9 (2000)
- Just Another Ordinary Day (2003)
- Close to Paradise (2006)
- Wooden Arms (2009)
- Adventures in Your Own Backyard (2012)
- Love Songs for Robots (2015)
- Wave (2019)
- Better in the Shade (2022)
- Uh Oh (2025)

Film scores

- It's Not Me, I Swear! (2008)
- Hidden Diary (2009)
- Mabul (2010)
- À St-Henri, le 26 août (2011)
- The Four Soldiers (2013)
- Les Châteaux de sable (2015)
- The 9th Life of Louis Drax (2016)
- Anote's Ark (2018)
- The Girl Who Cried Pearls (2025)

Singles

- "Luscious Life" (2006)
- "The Storm" (2006)
- "The Great Escape" (2007)
- "Fireweed" (2009)
- "Sit Down Beside Me" (2010)
- "Je te laisserai des mots" (2010), BPI: Platinum
- "Into Giants" (2012)
- "Turn Into the Noise" (2015)
- "Broken" (2017)
- "Melody Noir" (2018)
- "Mélancolie" (2018)
- "Dream for Dreaming" (2019)
- "Lost with You" (2020)
- "A Mermaid in Lisbon" (2021)
- "Ode to Vivian (rework)" (2022)
- "Perfect Day (komorebi version)" (2024) from the film Perfect Days
- "Silencio" (2024) Patrick Watson featuring November Ultra
- "Gordon in the Willows" (2025) Patrick Watson & Charlotte Cardin
- "Peter and the Wolf" (2025)
