= Close to Paradise =

Studio album by Patrick Watson
- Released: September 26, 2006
- Recorded: Breakglass Studio; Master Cuts, Montreal, Quebec
- Genre: Alternative folk
- Length: 48:07
- Label: Secret City
- Producers: Patrick Watson; Jace Lasek; Jean Massicotte; Dave Smith

Patrick Watson chronology
Just Another Ordinary Day (2003)	Close to Paradise (2006)	Wooden Arms (2009)

Professional ratings
Review scores
Source	Rating
Allmusic	4/5 stars
Bande à part	(8.4/10)
Canoë	4.5/5 stars
CHART	(favourable)
Pitchfork Media	(5.2/10)
Rockfeedback	4/5 stars
Yahoo Music UK	7/10 stars
Q	4/5 stars

Close to Paradise is the second studio album by Patrick Watson, released on September 26, 2006. On September 24, 2007, the album won the Polaris Music Prize, after reaching the finals alongside such other albums as Neon Bible (Arcade Fire), Ashtray Rock (Joel Plaskett Emergency), Woke Myself Up (Julie Doiron), and The Reminder (Feist).

== Track listing ==
1. "Close to Paradise"
2. "Daydreamer"
3. "Slip Into Your Skin"
4. "Giver"
5. "Weight of the World"
6. "The Storm"
7. "Mr. Tom"
8. "Luscious Life"
9. "Drifters"
10. "Man Under the Sea"
11. "The Great Escape"
12. "Sleeping Beauty"
13. "Bright Shiny Lights"

== In popular culture ==
The song "The Great Escape" was featured on episode 16 of the third season of Grey's Anatomy, which aired on February 15, 2007. It also appears in a commercial for Tropicana Products and the movie One Week. It also features during the credit sequences of The High Cost of Living. The song also appears in the movie "Struck by Lightning".

== Certifications ==
Region	Certification	Certified units/sales
Canada (Music Canada)	Gold	50,000^{^}
^{^} Shipments figures based on certification alone.
