= Felt (Suuns album) =

Studio album by Suuns
- Released: March 2, 2018
- Studio: Breakglass Studio
- Length: 45:59
- Label: Secretly Canadian

Suuns chronology
Hold/Still (2016)	Felt (2018)	Fiction (2020)

Professional ratings
Aggregate scores
Source	Rating
Metacritic	70/100
Review scores
Source	Rating
AllMusic	3/5 stars
The Austin Chronicle	3/5 stars
Drowned in Sound	7/10
Exclaim!	8/10
Pitchfork	7.4/10

Felt is the fourth studio album by Canadian band Suuns. It was released on March 2, 2018 under Secretly Canadian.

== Release ==
On January 11, 2018, the band announced their new album, along with the first single "Watch You, Watch Me". On May 15, 2018, the music video for "Look No Further" was released.

== Production ==
The album was recorded at Breakglass Studio's in Montreal, Quebec, and mixed by Grammy Award-winning producer John Congleton.

== Tour ==
Suuns announced a worldwide tour from February 2018 to April 2018, starting at Saint-Casimir, Quebec and finishing in Istanbul, Turkey.

== Critical reception ==
Felt was met with "generally favorable" reviews from critics. At Metacritic, which assigns a weighted average rating out of 100 to reviews from mainstream publications, this release received an average score of 70, based on 15 reviews. Aggregator Album of the Year gave the release a 70 out of 100 based on a critical consensus of 11 reviews.

=== Accolades ===
Accolades for Felt
Publication	Accolade	Rank
Gigwise	Gigwise's 51 Best Albums of 2018	45

== Track listing ==
Felt track listing
No.	Title	Length
1.	"Look No Further"	3:56
2.	"X-ALT"	3:21
3.	"Watch You, Watch Me"	5:56
4.	"Baseline"	4:23
5.	"After the Fall"	4:30
6.	"Control"	3:29
7.	"Make It Real"	4:40
8.	"Daydream"	4:43
9.	"Peace and Love"	3:45
10.	"Moonbeams"	2:17
11.	"Materials"	4:59

== Personnel ==
Musicians

- Ben Shemie – vocals
- Max Henry – vocals
- Liam O'Neill
- Jace Lasek – backing vocals
- Ted Crosby – saxophone

Production

- John Congleton – mixer, producer
- Dave Smith – engineer
- Ryan Morey – mastering
- Brian Chase – design

== Charts ==
Chart performance for Felt
Chart (2018)	Peak position
Belgian Albums (Ultratop Wallonia)	135
