= Waterproof9 =

Studio album by Patrick Watson
- Released: December 17, 2001
- Genre: Indie
- Length: 47:38
- Producer: Patrick Watson

Patrick Watson chronology
Waterproof9 (2001)	Just Another Ordinary Day (2003)

Waterproof9 is the first and only studio album released by solo artist Patrick Watson, before he joined Simon Angell, Robbie Kuster, and Mishka Stein to form the more well-known Patrick Watson band.

The album was written to accompany Brigitte Henry's Waterproof: Portrait sous l'eau photobook. Each track on the album shares its title with a photograph from the collection, and one of the photographs, Main Perpétuelle 1, is used on the album cover.

== Track listing ==
1. "Démon Marin"
2. "Mascarade"
3. "Nightfall"
4. "Huracán"
5. "Highway to Idaho"
6. "Main Perpétuelle"
7. "Sky Dancing"
8. "The Spell"
9. "Dark Gift"
10. [untitled]
