= Burning Love (band) =

Canadian hardcore punk band

- Origin: Toronto, Ontario
- Genres: Punk
- Years active: 2007–2015
- Labels: Southern Lord Records, Deranged, High Anxiety Records, Thirty Days of Night Records, Sound Study Recordings, Tee Pee Records, Nerve Hold Records, Dead Air at the Pulpit, Hell Comes Home, No Idea Records, Deathwish, Inc.
- Past members: Chris Colohan; Alex Goodall; Pat Marshall; Easton Lannaman; David O'Connor; Andrus Meret
- Website: burninglove416.blogspot.com

Burning Love was a Canadian hardcore punk band from Toronto formed in 2007 by vocalist Chris Colohan (also of the band Cursed and former members of the sludge band Our Father: David O'Connor (bass), Andrus Meret (guitar), and Easton Lannaman (drums).

== History ==
Burning Love started as a side project to the members' bands. The band began recording their first EP in 2007, but it was abandoned due to their dissatisfaction with the recording (most of the songs would appear on their 2009 demo). It was not until the sudden breakup of Cursed in 2008 that the band began (in 2008/2009) writing and recording full-time.

== Burning Love (2008–2009) ==
Burning Love recorded a 10-minute demo and released it on 8-track tape and free digital download. The demo was later pressed into a self-titled 7 inch in 2009 and released first on British label Thirty Days of Night Records (to coincide with a UK tour), and then domestically 24 April 2010 on Deranged Records.

== Songs for Burning Lovers (2010–2011) ==
In February and March 2010, the band recorded their first full-length album in Toronto with producer-musician Ian Blurton. On 25 April 2010, the band released the 7-inch single "Don't Ever Change" b/w "Jack the Ripper" on Deranged Records. A European version with an alternate cover (limited to 500) was released in November 2010 to coincide with a full tour of Europe and the UK. A live split LP with friends and tour mates Coliseum was recorded 27 June 2010 at the Atlantic in Gainesville, Florida during the tour. The live album was released 12 July 2011 by Tee Pee Records and Sound Study Recordings. In January 2011 David O'Connor left the band and was replaced on bass by Alex Goodall (a.k.a. "Hawk").

Exclaim! magazine named Songs for Burning Lovers the Number 2 Punk Album of 2010. Exclaim! writer Keith Carman said, "Detuned and thunderous while still melodically brilliant, gritty and raw, Songs For Burning Lovers is a rapid-fire dose of biting riffs, palpitating beats and pulverizing vocals." The band was later nominated for Punk/Hardcore Artist/Group of the Year at the 2011 Indie Awards.

== Rotten Thing To Say (2012) ==
The Rotten Thing To Say LP was recorded and produced by Kurt Ballou at God City in Salem, Massachusetts, and released on Southern Lord Records in June 2012. The band toured Canada, Australia and a full US tour with Black Breath, Enabler, Poison Idea, and Sweden's Martyrdöd. Guitarist Andrus Meret left the band in 2012; his last show with the band was the Rotten Things to Say release show in Toronto.

In spring 2012, a 7-inch EP titled Black Widow featuring an alternate version of the LP song "Karla" and a cover of the Laughing Hyenas' "Love's My Only Crime" was released on High Anxiety ahead of the LP. It was recorded by Josh Korody at Candle Studios in Toronto.

In 2015, the band released two singles, "Down So Long" and "Medicine Man". In May 2015, they announced on their website that they would be playing three shows with Cancer Bats. There have been no posts since. In a 2018 interview with Out of the Darkness magazine, Colohan told the interviewer that Burning Love is "dead".

== Discography ==
Albums

- Songs for Burning Lovers (2010), Deranged Records
- Live at the Atlantic: Volume Four Coliseum / Burning Love (2011), Sound Study Recordings, Tee Pee Records
- Rotten Thing to Say (2012), Southern Lord Records

EPs

- Unreleased EP (2007), Dead Air At The Pulpit
- Burning Love Demo (2008), Nerve Hold Records (cassette), Deranged Records (vinyl)

Singles

- "Burning Love" (2009), Thirty Days of Night Records (UK), Deranged Records
- "Don't Ever Change" / "Jack the Ripper" (2010), Deranged Records
- "Mess" – City Limits Compilation (2011), High Anxiety Records
- "The Body", Split 7-inch with Fight Amp (2012), Hell Comes Home
- "Karla" / "Love's My Only Crime", released as Black Widow (2012), High Anxiety Records, No Idea Records
- "Down So Long" / "Medicine Man" (2015), Deathwish

== See also ==
- Music of Canada
- Rock music of Canada
- List of bands from Canada
