= I (Cursed album) =

Studio album by Cursed
- Released: February 25, 2003
- Recorded: October 2002, Chemical Sound
- Genre: Hardcore punk Crust punk Sludge metal
- Length: 32:32
- Label: Deathwish (DWI20)
- Producer: Kurt Ballou

Cursed chronology
Demo (2003)	I (2003)	II (2005)

Reissue

Professional ratings
Review scores
Source	Rating
Allmusic	2/5 stars
Aversion Online	(7/10)

I is the debut studio album by Canadian hardcore punk band Cursed, released on February 25, 2003 via Deathwish Inc. It was recorded at Chemical Sound in Toronto, from October 19 to October 23, 2002. It received moderate critical acclaim. The album was reissued on vinyl by Trash Art! in 2007. The title is rendered as "One" on the sleeve of the reissued album, and the context provided by the album's successors, II and III, reinforces the interpretation of the title as the Roman numeral for the number one.

== Track listing ==
1. Polygraph - 1:25
2. God and Country - 4:16
3. Promised Land - 1:00
4. Bloody Mary - 2:03
5. How Great Things Happen When You Give Up Hope - 6:32
6. Nineteen Seventy Four - 2:50
7. Negative Two Point Five - 2:05
8. Guilt Parade - 3:14
9. Another Day - 0:58
10. Opposable Thumbs - 6:55
11. Pariah - 1:14
12. This Time Next Year (a.k.a. Dead or Alive) (unreleased track) - 2:08

== Cultural reference ==
The song "God and Country" contains a reference to CCR's Fortunate Son (the line "some folks inherit star-spangled eyes").
