= The Grid (newspaper) =

Canadian newspaper

- Type: Alternative weekly
- Format: Tabloid
- Publisher: Torstar
- Editor: Laas Turnbull
- Founded: 2011
- Ceased publication: 2014
- Headquarters: Toronto, Ontario, Canada

The Grid was a weekly newspaper in Toronto, Ontario, Canada, published from 2011 to 2014. The paper was launched on May 12, 2011, after owner Torstar discontinued publication of its previous title Eye Weekly.

According to editor Laas Turnbull, the publication's strategy was to be a "younger, hipper, more provocative version of Toronto Life in a weekly guise". Print circulation was as high as 70,000 per week, while website hits averaged 400,000 unique visitors per month.

Contributors to the new publication included several former Eye Weekly writers. As of July 2014 there were 22 staff, of whom 12 worked in editorial capacities.

On July 2, 2014, Torstar announced that The Grid would be discontinued as of July 3, due to insufficient revenues. 162 issues were printed in all.

== See also ==
- Dose (magazine)
- List of newspapers in Canada
