= Jerusalem in My Heart =

Multi-media performance project

- Origin: Beirut / Montréal
- Genres: Electronic; experimental; Arabic folk music; ambient
- Years active: 2005–present
- Label: Constellation Records
- Members: Radwan Ghazi Moumneh; Erin Weisgerber
- Past members: Jérémie Regnier; Malena Szlam; Karl Lemieux; Charles-André Coderre
- Website: jerusaleminmyheart.com

Jerusalem in My Heart (JIMH) is a live audio-visual performance project, with Montréal-based producer and musician Radwan Ghazi Moumneh (co-owner of The Hotel2Tango recording studio in Montreal) and Montréal-based filmmaker Erin Weisgerber. Jerusalem in My Heart release their music on Montreal label Constellation Records.

== Band history ==
Since 2013, JIMH have released four studio albums, Mo7it Al-Mo7it (2013), If He Dies, If If If If If If (2015), Daqa'iq Tudaiq (2018), Qalaq (2021) and a self-titled album with Suuns, released on Secretly Canadian. In 2016, Moumneh scored 6 of the 8 songs featured in Deserts (co-directed by Coderre). Jerusalem in My Heart curated some of the 2017 edition of the Le Guess Who? festival in Utrecht.

== Discography ==
- Mo7it Al-Mo7it (2013, Constellation Records)
- If He Dies, If If If If If If (2015, Constellation Records)
- Suuns and Jerusalem in My Heart (2015, Secretly Canadian, Secret City Records)
- Daqa'iq Tudaiq (2018, Constellation Records)
- Qalaq (2021, Constellation Records)
