= Hold/Still =

Studio album by Suuns
- Released: April 15, 2016
- Recorded: May, October 2015
- Studio: Elmwood Recording, Dallas, Texas; Breakglass Studios, Montréal, Quebec
- Length: 46:40
- Label: Secretly Canadian
- Producer: John Congleton

Suuns chronology
Suuns and Jerusalem in My Heart (2015)	Hold/Still (2016)	Felt (2018)

Hold/Still is a studio album by the Canadian rock band Suuns, produced by John Congleton and released in 2016 by the record label Secretly Canadian.

== Critical reception ==
Professional ratings
Aggregate scores
Source	Rating
AnyDecentMusic?	7.0/10
Metacritic	67/100
Review scores
Source	Rating
AllMusic	3.5/5 stars
Clash	6/10
Consequence of Sound	B
DIY	3/5 stars
Drowned in Sound	8/10
Exclaim!	9/10
PopMatters	7/10
Q	2/5 stars
Spin	7/10
Uncut	8/10

=== Accolades ===
Publication	Accolade	Year	Rank
Rough Trade	Albums of the Year	2016	27

== Track listing ==
No.	Title	Length
1.	"Fall"	3:06
2.	"Instrument"	3:20
3.	"UN-NO"	3:43
4.	"Resistance"	5:11
5.	"Mortise and Tenon"	3:33
6.	"Translate"	4:57
7.	"Brainwash"	5:02
8.	"Careful"	7:03
9.	"Paralyzer"	4:24
10.	"Nobody Can Save Me Now"	4:09
11.	"Infinity"	2:12
Total length:		46:40

== Charts ==
Chart (2016)	Peak position
Belgian Albums (Ultratop Flanders)	141
Belgian Albums (Ultratop Wallonia)	91
French Albums (SNEP)	143
