= Reflections Records =

- Founded: 1998
- Genre: Hardcore punk, indie rock, metalcore, experimental rock
- Country of origin: Netherlands
- Location: Tilburg
- Official website: www.reflectionsrecords.com

Reflections Records is a Dutch record label based in Arnhem and focused primarily on hardcore punk music. It started in 1994 as a fanzine that in 1998 added a 7-inch compilation to one issue that proved successful and sparked a shift to becoming a record label. At present, Reflections releases albums in a number of genres, including hardcore, indie rock and extreme metal. It also offers licensed releases for bands from outside of Europe.

== Selected affiliated bands ==
- 108
- The Automatic
- Blacklisted
- Circle
- Daughters
- Doomriders
- Ensign
- Face Tomorrow
- Give Up the Ghost
- Good Clean Fun
- Kill Your Idols
- Modern Life Is War
- Psyopus
- Ritual
- Siren
- Stretch Arm Strong
- Sworn In
- The Suicide File
- Terror
- The Deal
- The Red Chord
- Time In Malta
