= Secret City Records =

Canadian record label

- Founded: 2006
- Founder: Justin West; Andrew Rose
- Genre: Indie
- Country of origin: Canada
- Location: Montreal, Quebec
- Official website: secretcityrecords.com

Secret City Records is a Canadian independent record label based in Montreal, Quebec, Canada. The music label was founded in 2006 by Andrew Rose and Justin West, originally as sublabel of Justin Time Records. It became fully independent in late 2008 and closed a distribution deal with EMI in 2009.

Artists who have released material on Secret City include Patrick Watson, Miracle Fortress, Plants and Animals, Diamond Rings, Human Highway, Basia Bulat, Thus Owls, Daniel Isaiah, Bibi Club, Klô Pelgag, Daniel Bélanger and The Barr Brothers. The label has also been the Canadian distributor for albums by The Go! Team.

A number of albums released on the label have gone on to be shortlisted for the Polaris Music Prize. Patrick Watson's Close to Paradise was the prize winner in 2007, a year in which Miracle Fortress' Five Roses was also shortlisted, and in 2008 both Basia Bulat's Heart of My Own and Plants and Animals' Parc Avenue were shortlisted for the prize, while Patrick Watson's Wooden Arms was shortlisted in 2009.
