= McEnroe =

McEnroe may refer to:

- McEnroe (surname)
- McEnroe (talk show), 2004 chat show hosted by the tennis player
- Mcenroe (rapper), stage name of Rod Bailey, Canadian rapper
- John McEnroe, tennis player

== See also ==
- McInroe, surname
