= Scott Pilgrim vs. the World =

2010 film by Edgar Wright

- Theatrical release poster
- Directed by: Edgar Wright
- Screenplay by: Michael Bacall; Edgar Wright
- Based on: Scott Pilgrim by Bryan Lee O'Malley
- Produced by: Marc Platt; Eric Gitter; Nira Park; Edgar Wright
- Starring: Michael Cera; Mary Elizabeth Winstead; Kieran Culkin; Chris Evans; Anna Kendrick; Alison Pill; Brandon Routh; Jason Schwartzman
- Cinematography: Bill Pope
- Edited by: Jonathan Amos; Paul Machliss
- Music by: Nigel Godrich
- Production companies: Universal Pictures; Marc Platt Productions; Big Talk Films; Closed on Mondays Entertainment
- Distributed by: Universal Pictures
- Release dates: July 22, 2010 (San Diego Comic-Con); July 27, 2010 (Fantasia Festival); August 13, 2010 (United States); August 25, 2010 (United Kingdom)
- Running time: 112 minutes
- Countries: United States; United Kingdom
- Language: English
- Budget: $60–85 million
- Box office: $47.8 million

Scott Pilgrim vs. the World is a 2010 romantic action comedy film directed by Edgar Wright, and written by Wright and Michael Bacall, based on the graphic novel series Scott Pilgrim by Bryan Lee O'Malley. It stars Michael Cera as Scott Pilgrim, a slacker musician who is trying to win a competition to get a record deal, while also battling the seven evil exes of his new girlfriend Ramona Flowers, played by Mary Elizabeth Winstead. The ensemble cast also features Kieran Culkin, Chris Evans, Anna Kendrick, Alison Pill, Brandon Routh, and Jason Schwartzman.

A film adaptation of Scott Pilgrim was proposed following the release of the first volume, and Wright was attached early in development. Filming took place between March and August 2009 in Toronto. The film uses famous features of its Toronto setting and matches the style of video game and comic book imagery. It used real musical artists, including Beck and Metric, as a basis for each fictional group in the battle of the bands plot, with some of the actors also performing. The score was composed by Nigel Godrich. A combination of digital and physical methods were used to create the extensive VFX.

The film premiered at San Diego Comic-Con on July 22, 2010, before premiering at the Fantasia Festival on July 27. It was released in the United States on August 13, and in the United Kingdom on August 25, by Universal Pictures. It received positive reviews from critics, who noted its visual style and humor, though it was a box-office failure, grossing $48 million against a budget of $60–85 million. It has since garnered a cult following. The film made several top ten lists and received several awards and nominations. In scholarly analysis, it has been widely discussed as a transmedia narrative. The film's main cast reprised their roles in the 2023 animated television series Scott Pilgrim Takes Off, Wright and Bacall also served as executive producers on the series, which was co-written by O'Malley.

== Plot ==
In Toronto, Scott Pilgrim, a 22-year-old bassist for unsuccessful indie garage band Sex Bob-Omb, dates Knives Chau, a 17-year-old high-school student, to the disapproval of his friends in the band, his younger sister Stacey, and his roommate Wallace Wells. Scott meets Ramona Flowers, an American Amazon delivery girl, at Julie Powers' party, after having first seen her in a dream. Scott loses interest in Knives but does not break up with her immediately before pursuing Ramona.

When Sex Bob-Omb plays in a battle of the bands sponsored by record executive Gideon Graves, Scott is attacked by Ramona's ex-boyfriend Matthew Patel. Sex Bob-Omb's competition is incinerated by Matthew's fireball attacks, but Scott defeats him and learns he must defeat Ramona’s remaining six evil exes in order to date her. Scott finally breaks up with Knives, who blames Ramona and swears to win him back by becoming more like Ramona.

Scott soon encounters Ramona's second ex, actor and skateboard junkie Lucas Lee. Scott defeats Lucas by tricking him into attempting a grind on a 200-plus step icy railing and crashing explosively. The band is soon asked to open for Clash at Demonhead, whereupon Scott encounters Ramona's third ex, the super-powered vegan bassist Todd Ingram, who is dating Scott's ex, Envy Adams, the lead singer. Scott deceives Todd into drinking half and half, and Todd is confronted by the vegan police and stripped of his powers; Scott then delivers the final blow. Scott then encounters Ramona's fourth ex, bisexual ninja Roxy Richter, and with the help of Ramona, he manages to beat her. Scott's growing frustration soon boils over, and after an outburst regarding Ramona's dating history, she breaks up with him while leaving him a list of her exes.

At the next battle of the bands, Sex Bob-Omb defeats Ramona's fifth and sixth exes, techno twins Kyle and Ken Katayanagi, earning Scott an extra life. Despite this, Ramona appears to get back with her seventh and final ex, Gideon. Sex Bob-Omb accepts Gideon's record deal, except Scott, who quits the band in protest, during which their roadie, Young Neil, becomes their new bassist. Gideon invites Scott to his venue, the Chaos Theater, where Sex Bob-Omb is playing. Resolving to win Ramona back, Scott challenges Gideon to a fight for her affection, earning the "Power of Love" sword. Knives interrupts the battle, attacking Ramona, and Scott is forced to reveal that he cheated on both of them.

Gideon kills Scott, and Ramona visits him in limbo to reveal that Gideon has implanted her with a mind control device. Scott uses his 1-up to come back to life and re-enters the Chaos Theater. He makes peace with his friends and challenges Gideon, this time for himself, gaining the "Power of Self-Respect" sword. After apologizing to Ramona and Knives for cheating on them and accepting his own faults, Scott joins forces with Knives and they defeat Gideon. Now free from Gideon's control, Ramona begins to leave. Knives accepts that her relationship with Scott is over and, at her encouragement, he runs after Ramona to "try again".

== Cast ==
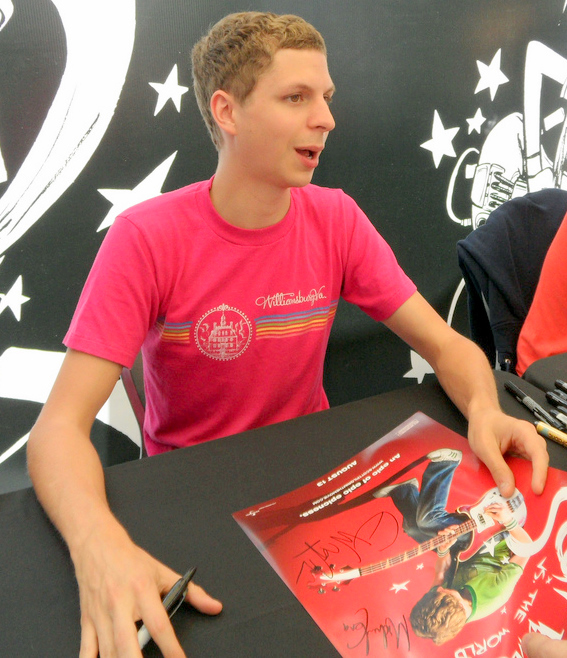
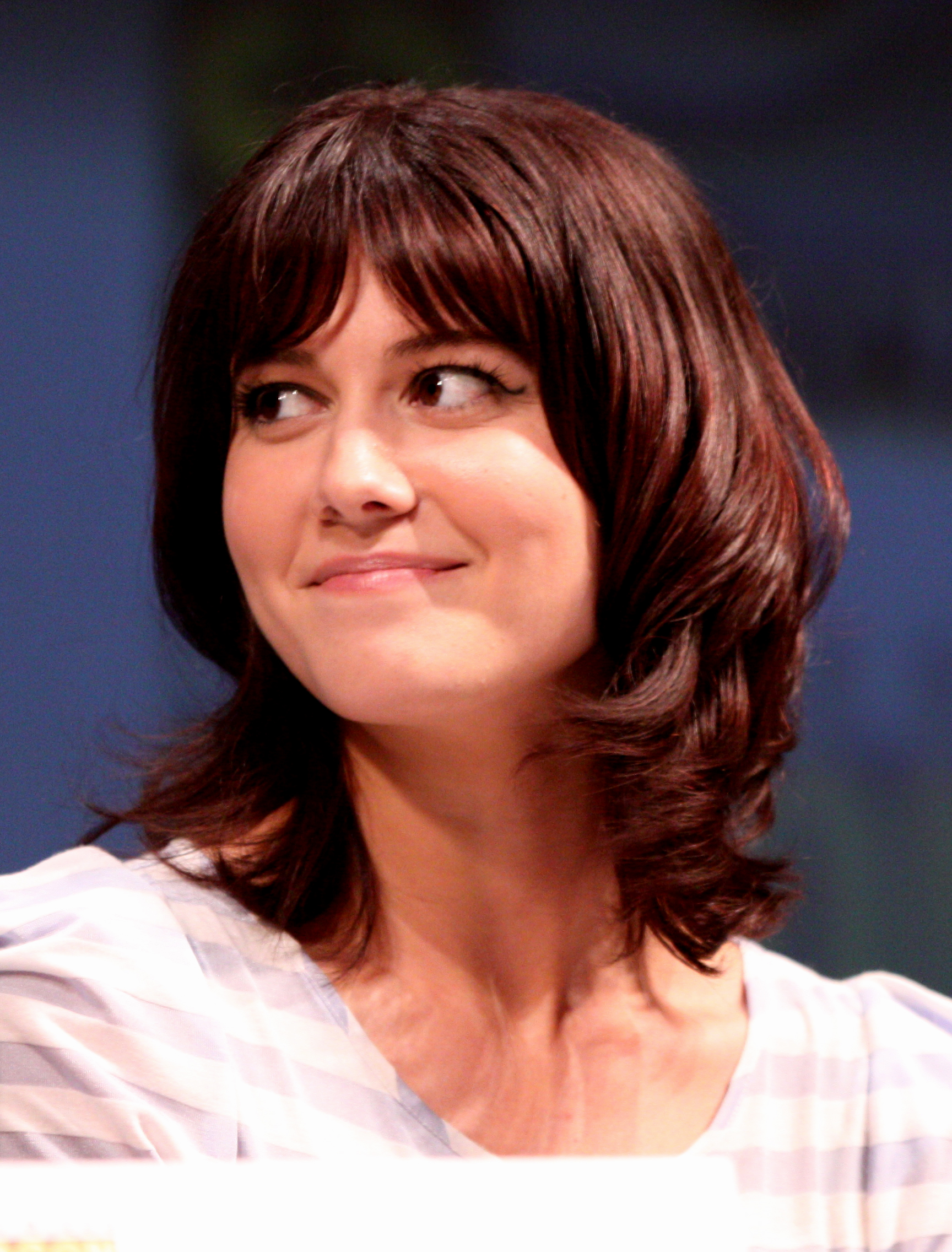
Michael Cera and Mary Elizabeth Winstead (both pictured at the 2010 San Diego Comic-Con) star in the film as Scott Pilgrim and Ramona Flowers, respectively.

=== Main characters ===
- Michael Cera as Scott Pilgrim and Nega Scott
- Mary Elizabeth Winstead as Ramona Flowers
- Kieran Culkin as Wallace Wells
- Anna Kendrick as Stacey Pilgrim
- Brie Larson as Natalie V. "Envy" Adams
- Alison Pill as Kim Pine
- Aubrey Plaza as Julie Powers
- Johnny Simmons as "Young" Neil Nordegraf
- Mark Webber as Stephen Stills
- Ellen Wong as Knives Chau

=== League of Evil Exes ===
- Satya Bhabha as Matthew Patel
- Chris Evans as Lucas Lee
- Brandon Routh as Todd Ingram
- Mae Whitman as Roxanne "Roxy" Richter
- Keita Saito as Ken Katayanagi
- Shota Saito as Kyle Katayanagi
- Jason Schwartzman as Gideon "G-Man" Graves

=== Other characters ===
- Nelson Franklin as Michael Comeau
- Bill Hader as The Voice
- Erik Knudsen as Lucas "Crash" Wilson
- Thomas Jane as Vegan Police Officer (uncredited)
- Clifton Collins Jr. as Vegan Police Officer (uncredited)
- Ben Lewis as Other Scott
- Tennessee Thomas as Lynette Guycott
- Chantelle Chung as Tamara Chen
- Kjartan Hewitt as Jimmy
- Michael Lazarovitch as Some Guy
- Abigail Chu as Trisha "Trasha" Ha
- John Patrick Amedori as Lollipop Hipster
- Joe Dinicol as Elevator Hipster
- Craig Stickland as Elevator Hipster
- Don McKellar as Director

== Production ==
=== Development ===
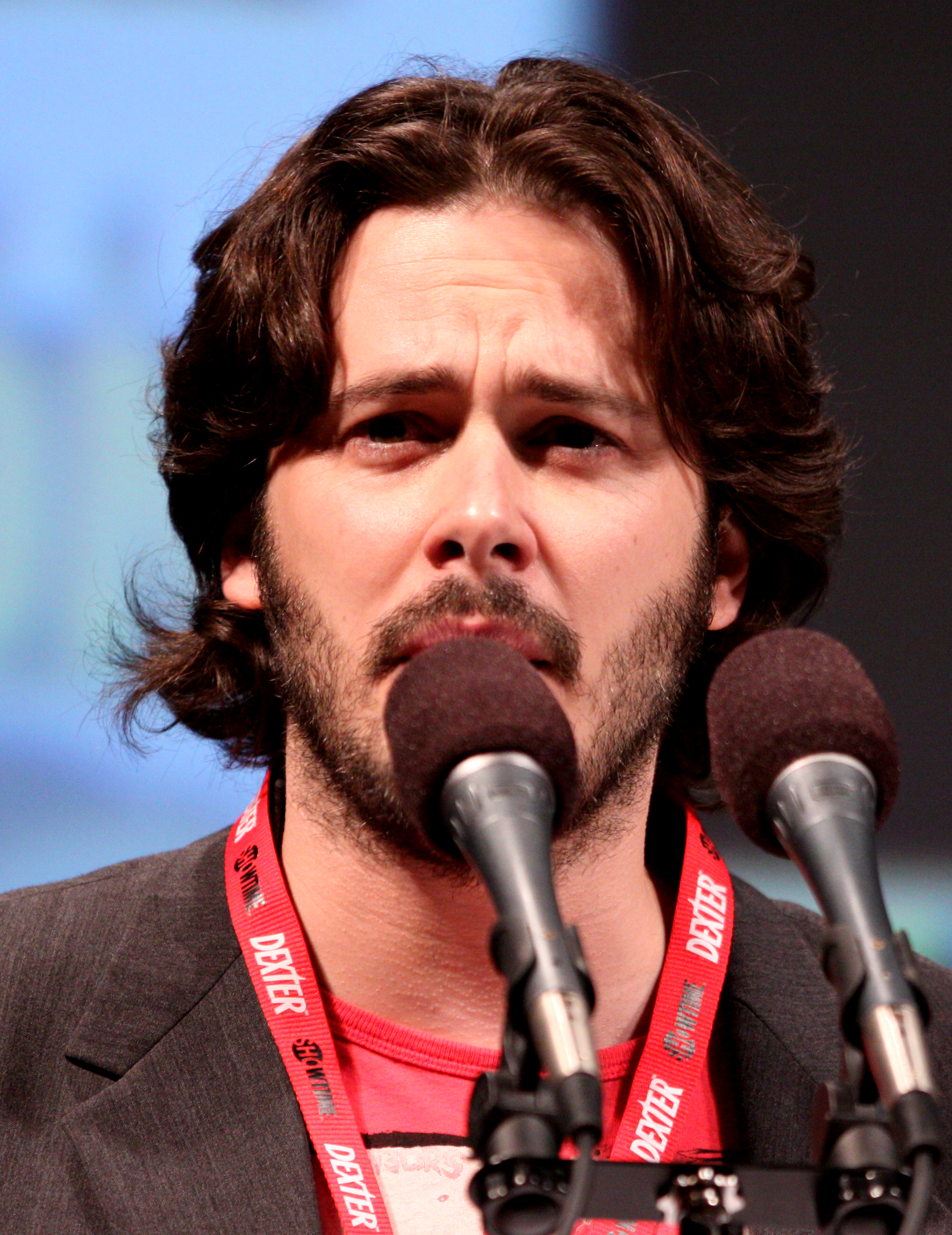
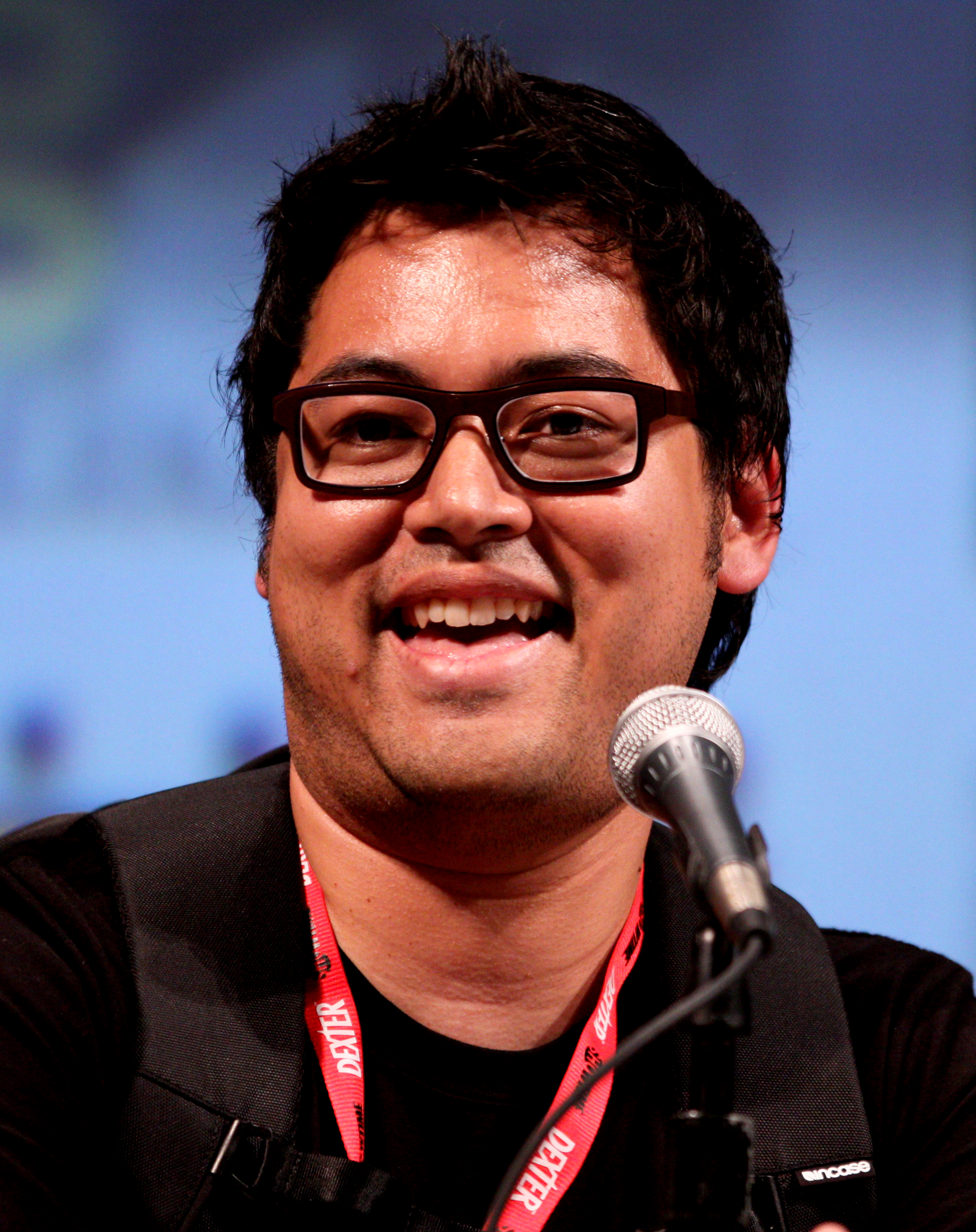
Director Edgar Wright and Scott Pilgrim creator Bryan Lee O'Malley at the 2010 San Diego Comic-Con. In his chapter on the comic in Icons of the American Comic Book, Dave Wallace wrote that "Wright was the perfect choice to helm the Scott Pilgrim movie, given his experiences of directing British sitcom Spaced. Like Scott Pilgrim, the characters of Spaced viewed the world through a filter that aggregated various elements of pop culture".

After artist Bryan Lee O'Malley completed the first volume of Scott Pilgrim, his publisher Oni Press contacted producer Marc E. Platt to propose a film adaptation. O'Malley originally had mixed feelings about a film adaptation, stating that he "expected them to turn it into a full-on action comedy with some actor that [he] hated", though he also "didn't even care", admitting: "I was a starving artist, and I was like, 'Please, just give me some money.'" Universal Studios contracted director Edgar Wright, who had just finished the 2004-released Shaun of the Dead and agreed to adapt the Scott Pilgrim comics. Wright had first become interested in making the film when given a pre-release copy of the first graphic novel during the Shaun of the Dead press tour, later saying that "everything that [he] found interesting about the book, and why it felt fresh and unique, was irresistible to adapt." In May 2005, the studio signed Michael Bacall to co-write the screenplay.

Wright cited Mario Bava's 1968 film Danger: Diabolik (another adaptation of a comic series) as an influence on his approach to Scott Pilgrim, stating that he took an "Italian influence, a sense of completely unbridled imagination. They don't make any attempt to make it look realistic. Mario Bava's composition and staging has a real try-anything attitude." Other influences on the screenwriters include musical films like Beyond the Valley of the Dolls, Dig!, and particularly Phantom of the Paradise. The film also takes on elements of style from the graphic novels, including the use of comic book text-as-graphic (e.g. sound effect onomatopoeia), which is described by Wright and O'Malley as "merely the internal perspective of how Scott understands himself and the world". It has been described as both a video game and a comic book film.

Bacall said that he wanted to write the Scott Pilgrim film because he felt strongly about its story and empathized with its characters. Wright said that O'Malley was "very involved" with the script of the film from the start, contributing lines and adding polish. Due to the long development, several lines from various scripts written by Wright and Bacall were used in later Scott Pilgrim comics. The screenplay's second draft, which O'Malley said "became the main draft for the film", was submitted right at midnight on the night the Writers' Strike was supposed to begin in October 2007. No material from Scott Pilgrim's Finest Hour, the sixth Scott Pilgrim volume, appeared in the film, as the comic was not complete at the time of the film's production; O'Malley contributed suggestions for the film's ending and gave the producers his notes for the sixth volume, but stated that the film's ending was "their ending". Some ideas for the film's ending were cut before production, including that Scott would turn out to be a serial killer who fantasized the gaming aspects and that Gideon would turn into a Transformers-style robot.

Casting of the principal characters began in June 2008, with Wright consulting with O'Malley during casting. Test shoots began in July 2008, with Wright saying that there was a year of preparation before shooting began. He also stopped working on his Ant-Man screenplay for two years during the production of Scott Pilgrim vs. the World. By 2009, casting had been completed and the film was titled Scott Pilgrim vs. the World. The cast spent two months in fight training together before filming, with Bradley James Allan and Peng Zhang of the Jackie Chan Stunt Team; Michael Cera said that he "got kicked in the throat during the training" and "expected it to be excruciating, but it didn't hurt at all, which was really confusing."

Part of a page from the script for the film, showing the new ending

In the film's original ending, written before the release of the final Scott Pilgrim book, Scott gets back together with Knives. O'Malley objected to the first ending because he felt it would dilute Knives's character. After the final book in the series, in which Scott and Ramona get back together, was released, and with divided audience reaction to the film's original ending, a new ending was filmed to match the books, with Scott and Ramona getting back together. O'Malley helped write the new ending and Wright called Knives' actress Ellen Wong beforehand, thinking she might be disappointed at the change but finding that she liked the idea. The final ending was shot three months before the film was released; Wright says that it is his "preferred ending". The film was given a production budget of $85–90 million, an amount offset by tax rebates that resulted in a final cost of around $60 million. Universal fronted $60 million of the pre-rebate budget. O'Malley's commentary track was recorded on August 14, 2010, one day after the film's theatrical release.

=== Filming ===
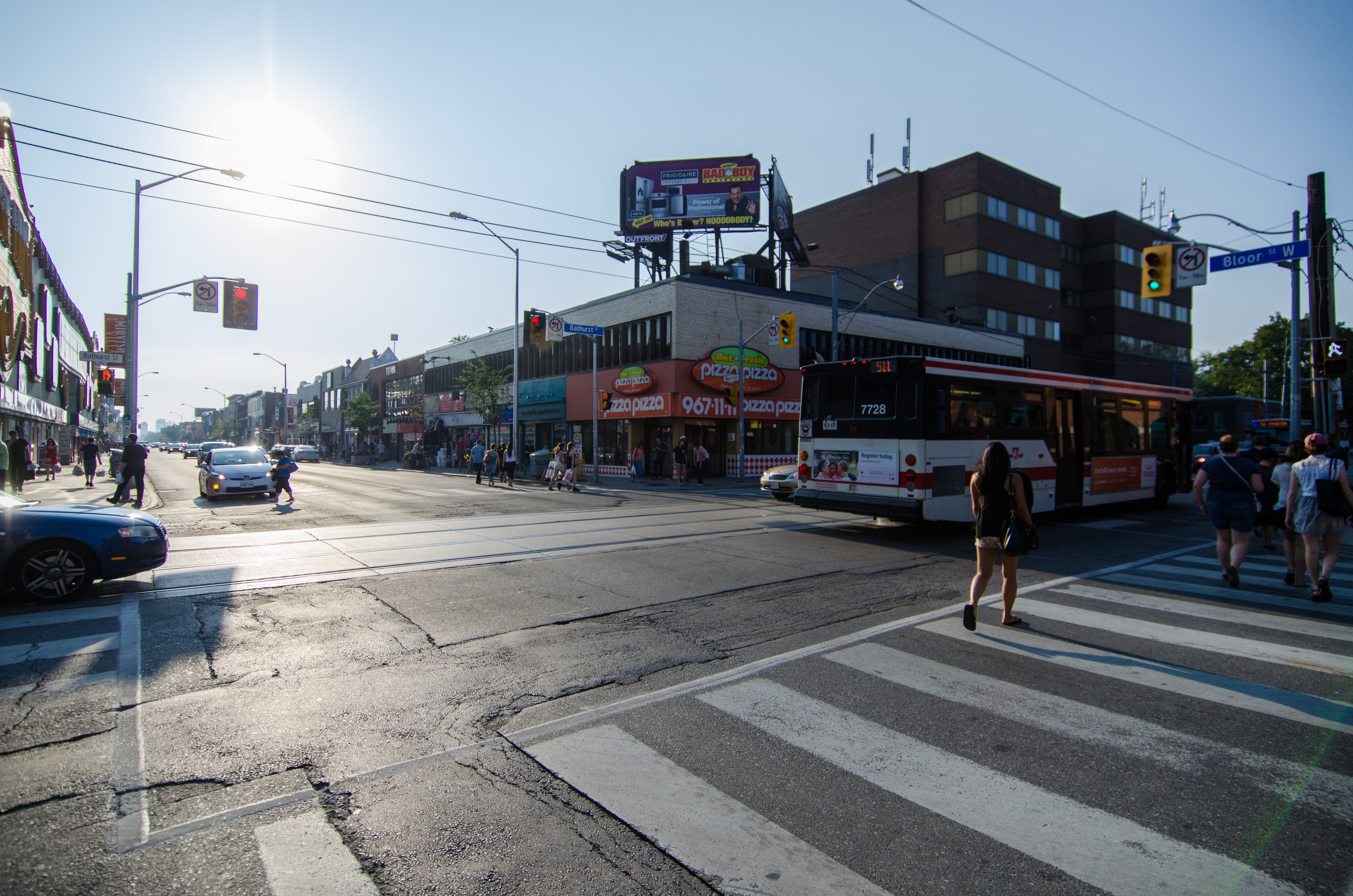
The intersection at Bathurst Street, with the Bloor Street West Pizza Pizza, used in the film.

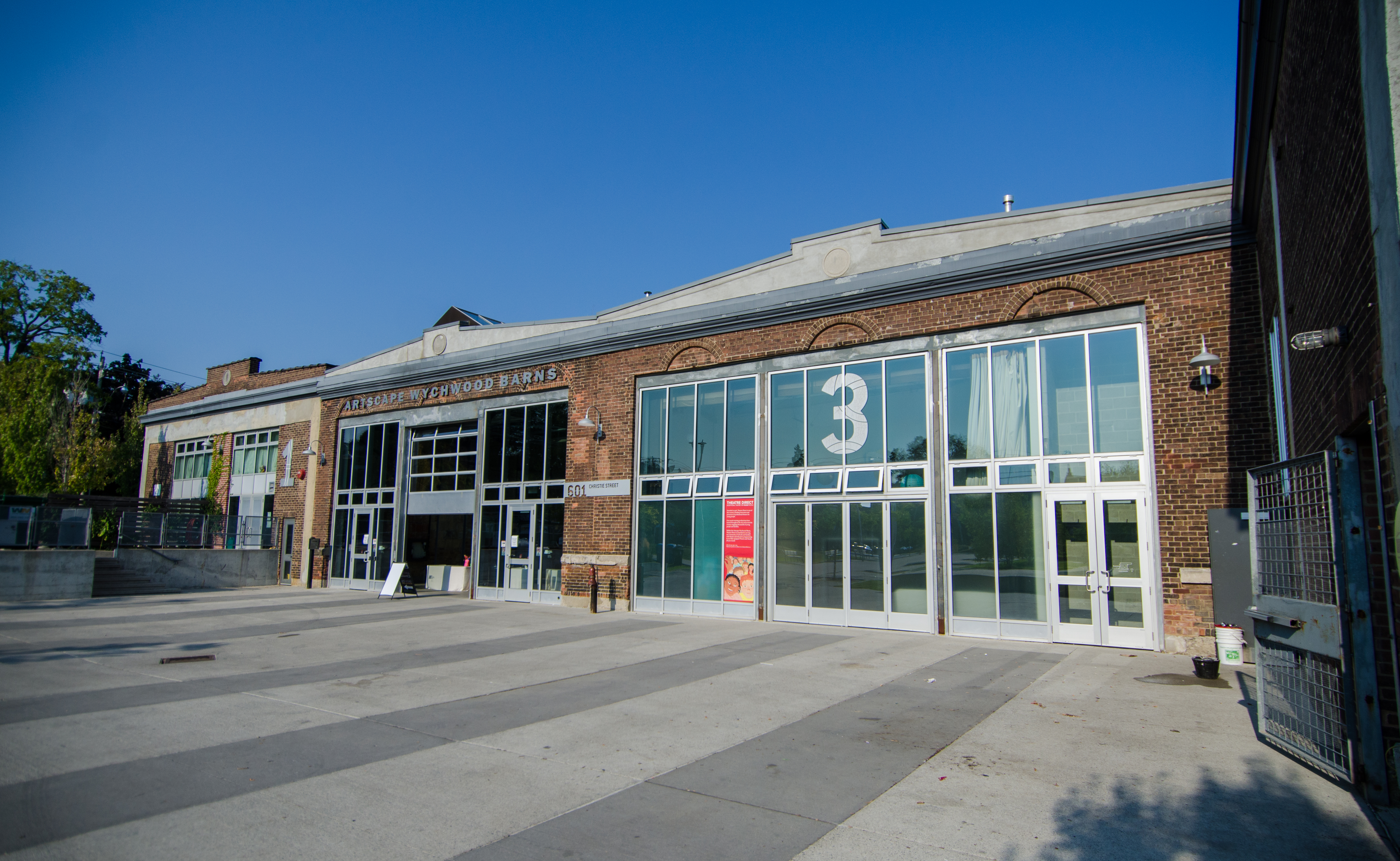
The Artscape Wychwood Barns venue was used as the nightclub for the after-party, where Scott fights Roxy.

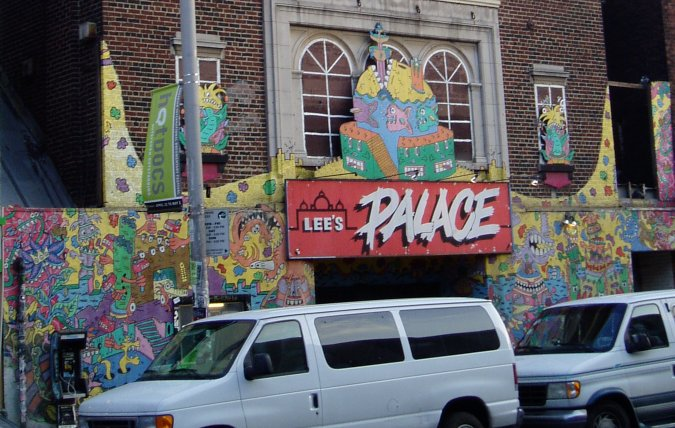
Lee's Palace entrance mural pre-2010

Principal photography began in March 2009 in Toronto, and wrapped as scheduled on August 28. One of the producers, Miles Dale, said that the film is "the biggest movie ever identifiably set in Toronto." The film features notable Toronto locations Casa Loma, St. Michael's College School, Sonic Boom, the Toronto Public Library Wychwood Library, a Goodwill location on St. Clair West, a Second Cup, a Pizza Pizza, Lee's Palace, and Artscape Wychwood Barns. The production planned to set the film in Toronto because, in Dale's words, "the books are super-specific in their local details" and director Wright wanted to use the imagery from the books, so Universal Studios had no plans to alter the setting. Dale stated that "Bathurst Street is practically the cerebral cortex of Scott Pilgrim". David Fleischer of Torontoist wrote that though films set in New York City show off all the major landmarks, "Scott Pilgrim revels in the simplicity" of everyday locations that are still identifiably Toronto, like the Bathurst/Bloor intersection and a single Pizza Pizza restaurant.

Director Wright, who lived in the city for a year before making the film, said that "as a British filmmaker making [his] first film outside the UK, [he] wouldn't want anyone to give [him] demerits for getting the location wrong", sticking to the real Toronto and "shooting even the most banal of locations" in the comic. Wright said that the first thing he did when he arrived in Toronto was to tour all of the locations with O'Malley, saying that this gave him a "kind of touch down at the real locations [that] just made everything feel right", though O'Malley could not remember the exact spots of some and so they drove around using his comic reference photos to find them. The production was allowed to film in Second Cup and Pizza Pizza locations, with Wright saying that using them instead of Starbucks "just felt right" because "it means something to Canadian audiences and people in international audiences just think [they] made [Pizza Pizza] up [them]selves. It sounds like a cute movie brand".

Wright said that he took pride in having been able to record the original Lee's Palace mural before it was taken down; he also had the old bar reconstructed on a set for interior scenes, which was positively received when the bands consulting for the film visited. Wright suggested that "they wanted it preserved as a museum piece". Another reconstruction was the Rock It club, which no longer existed, with the interior built on a soundstage. The Sonic Boom store had been changed from how it appeared in the comics, but allowed its interior to be fully restored to the previous look for filming. The backgrounds were also changed for the film: many landscapes were simplified in post-production to emulate the drawing style in the comics, including removing many trees from the scenes shot at Hillcrest Park and Turner Road.

Casa Loma has served as a movie set for many different productions, and so appearing in Scott Pilgrim vs. the World as itself being a movie set was described as "very trippy". The scene at Casa Loma also shows the CN Tower and Baldwin Steps, with Don McKellar (who played the director in the scene) reporting that "people were going crazy" at opening night in Toronto when it played. The Casa Loma fight is in the original comic book, but the moment when Scott Pilgrim is pushed through a matte painting generic cityscape to reveal the CN Tower was only added for the film. In his chapter, '"Scott Pilgrim Gets It Together": The Cultural Crossovers of Bryan Lee O'Malley', Mark Berninger calls this reveal "an ironic reference to the specific filmic location" and says that it is "entirely in line with O'Malley's use of metafictional commentary to stress transnational hybridity precisely by highlighting Canadian identity".

=== Casting ===
Wright also has an incredible eye for casting, filling his film with people who could, and often soon would, be superheroes. To give you an idea of how appropriately superheroic this lot are, the line-up includes the once or future Superman, Captain America, Captain Marvel, LEGO Robin, Royal Pain, Human Torch, Punisher, and The Atom.

— Helen O'Hara, The Ultimate Superhero Movie Guide (2020) pp.74–75

Casting took place between 2008 and 2010, involving director Wright and casting directors Jennifer Euston, Allison Jones, and Robin D. Cook. Cera was cast in March 2008 and Winstead in May. By the end of 2008, Whitman, Wong, and Kendrick were cast; in January 2009, Routh, Evans, and Larson were announced together, with Webber, Pill, Simmons, and Bhabha added around the same time. Extras casting in Toronto began in February 2009. Though based on a graphic novel about a musician, experts and reviewers consider the film to be a comic book adaptation and a superhero film, and in the years after its release commenters noted that the film features an all-star cast of the biggest actors in comic book and superhero films, with CBR's Noah Dominguez saying that "Scott Pilgrim vs. the World may have the best of comic book movie actors, ever". Patrick O'Donnell of NME wrote that "notable actors [having starred] in comic book adaptations before and after their roles in Scott Pilgrim [injects] a meta quality to the film's already genre-busting style".

Director Wright felt confident with his casting in the film, saying that "like with Hot Fuzz [when they] had great people in every single tiny part, it's the same with this. What's great with this is that there's people [like] Michael [Cera] and Jason [Schwartzman], and [...] people who are up and coming, like Anna Kendrick, Aubrey Plaza and Brie Larson, and then there's complete unknowns as well". Collider noted that the less-known actors fit their roles well, with Wright confirming that they did not have much pressure to find a lot of big names, adding that "Universal never really gave [him] any problems about casting bigger people, because in a way Michael [Cera] has starred in two $100 million-plus movies, and also a lot of the other people, though they're not the biggest names, people certainly know who they are." He also noted that while some of the actors were more famous when they auditioned, like Schwartzman and Evans, others became more well-known over the time the film was in development, saying that "Anna Kendrick did her first audition for it before she shot the first Twilight. And Aubrey Plaza got the part in Scott Pilgrim before she did Funny People or Parks and Recreation, which is crazy. It shows you how long this film has taken to get made."

The casting decisions were all run by O'Malley during a casting session with Wright; O'Malley was not in the room but was shown all of the tapes. Wright said that he planned on casting Cera while he was writing Hot Fuzz, after watching episodes of Arrested Development, also saying that he needed an actor that "audiences will still follow even when the character is being a bit of an ass." Cera said he was equally excited to work with Wright, "because [he] was a big fan of his". He committed to working out for fight scenes for a year in preparation, earning him the on-set nickname "push-up king" because of how muscular he became. Wright explained that though Cera is a talented musician, they were not particularly looking for people who could already play instruments, with the cast members who could not subsequently learning for the film. Like Cera, Wright already had in mind Mary Elizabeth Winstead as his choice for Ramona Flowers, thinking of her for the part two years before filming had started because "she has a very sunny disposition as a person, so it was interesting to get her to play a version of herself that was broken inside. She's great in the film because she causes a lot of chaos but remains supernaturally grounded". In 2020, Wright and Winstead explained how she had been his first choice after he saw her in Death Proof and because she has big eyes that reflected the graphic novel. Wright said that Universal had suggested Seth Rogen for the role of Scott, as his recent film Knocked Up had been successful, but Wright could not see anyone but Cera in the role.

Ellen Wong, a little-known Toronto actress, auditioned for the part of Knives Chau three times. On her second audition, Wright learned that Wong has a green belt in taekwondo, and says he found himself intrigued by this "sweet-faced young lady being a secret badass". In the 2020 retrospective by Entertainment Weekly, Wong said she did not think she would even be considered for the role because she is Asian, while Chris Evans said that he was approached by Wright about a role in the film and felt that "it was a no-brainer [because he] was such a big fan of" the director, taking the role of Lucas Lee. Other actors considered for Lucas were Evans' future Marvel Cinematic Universe co-star Sebastian Stan and Twilight's Robert Pattinson. The actors playing Lucas's stunt doubles are the actual stunt doubles for Evans. Aubrey Plaza, who has a supporting role as Julie Powers, said that "there's a lot of weird, perfectly casted people", citing Michael Cera and Alison Pill as particularly matching their characters. Other candidates for Pill's role of Kim were Betty Gilpin, Zoe Kazan, and Rooney Mara. As well as Plaza, other members of the cast and crew expressed similar sentiments: Kieran Culkin explained that he was sent a script to audition without a character name, but when he saw the description of Wallace he knew the role was for him, and Wright said that the audition of then-18-year-old Brie Larson "blew everybody else away", adding: "[executive producer] Jared [LeBoff] and I both said afterward, 'We've got to cast her'."

Wright says one thing he is particularly happy with is that this film, unlike many comedies including his own, has "a lot of funny women in it", recalling a particular scene he dubbed "the funny lady relay race", because it "starts with Anna Kendrick, then switches to Aubrey Plaza, then switches to Mary [Elizabeth Winstead], then switches to Brie Larson, and it's just Michael [Cera] being attacked from all sides from all the different women in the film." In June 2013, O'Malley, who is of Korean and white Canadian parentage, stated that he regretted the fact that the film's cast was predominantly white, and that there were not enough roles for minorities.

The cast of the film reprised their roles for the 2023 Netflix animated series Scott Pilgrim Takes Off.

=== Music ===
The film is not only physically set in Toronto, but also, according to Allan Weiss, culturally and temporally located within "the Annex and Wychwood neighbourhoods [of Toronto] during the David Miller era", the time and place of a very specific music scene that the film "embed[s] [itself] into [...] not only via Scott's fictional band[,] but also by the appearance of such clubs as the now defunct Rockit[, and] the film's indie rock soundtrack"; Weiss asserts that the film "marks the mythologizing of the cool Annex scene, the transformation of Toronto indie rock [...] into the stuff of adventure", as "nearly all of the major events [...] are connected in some way to this music scene."

The soundtrack features contributions by Nigel Godrich, Beck, Metric, Broken Social Scene, Cornelius, Dan the Automator, Kid Koala, and David Campbell. O'Malley had written up playlists for each of the comics in the back of the books, introducing Wright to other Canadian bands during development. Building on this, Wright said that the production "tried to [...] find a real band for each of the fictional bands, because usually in music films you have one composer who does everything". Wright and Godrich met with and scouted bands to write for the film for two years. Godrich scored the film, his first film score. Before he became involved, early scripts had the running joke that "you never heard the bands [...] You heard the intro, and then it would cut to the next scene, and somebody would be going, 'Oh my God, that's the best song ever.' That was a joke for a long time", according to Wright.

Webber, Pill, and Simmons, as the members of Sex Bob-omb all had to learn to play their respective instruments and spent time rehearsing as a band with Cera (who already played bass) before filming began. Chris Murphy of the band Sloan was the guitar coach for the actors in the film. The actors also sing on the film's soundtrack. Beck wrote and composed the music played by Sex Bob-omb in the film. The songs took two days to write and record, with Beck saying that "it needed to be underthought, [...] they had to be funny, but [he] also wanted them to sound raw, like demos." Brian LeBarton plays drums and bass for the band on the film's score and soundtrack. Two unreleased songs can also be heard in the teaser trailer.

Brendan Canning and Kevin Drew of Broken Social Scene wrote all the songs for Crash and the Boys. The tracks were sung by Erik Knudsen, who plays Crash in the film. Drew stated the reason behind this was that "[he] knew that [Knudsen] didn't need to be a singer to pull [it] off" because the songs were "so quick and punk and fast" and "it needed to be the character's voice."

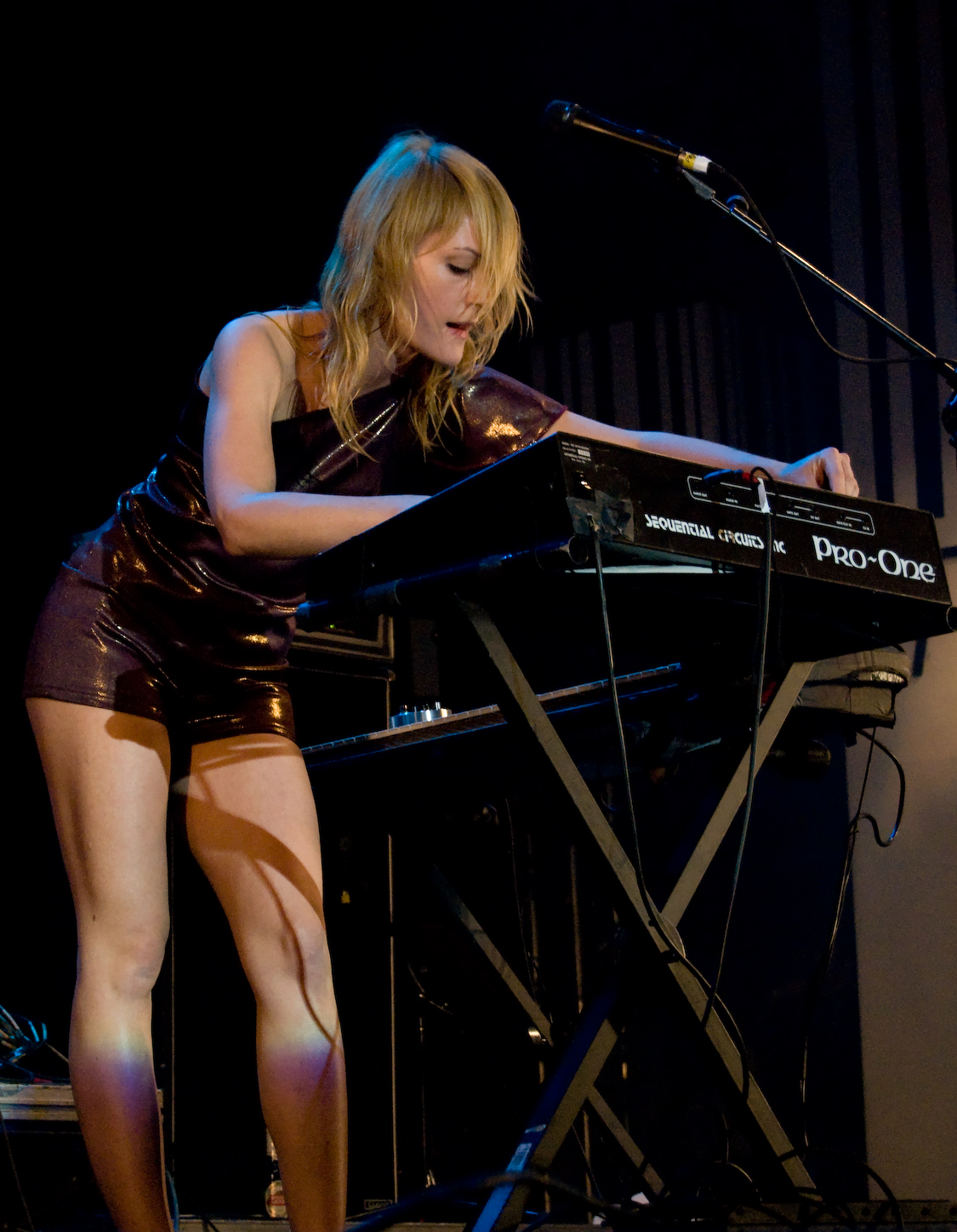
Emily Haines performing and Brie Larson as Envy Adams

Metric is the inspiration for the film's band the Clash at Demonhead and contributed the song "Black Sheep" to the film, by request of Godrich. The clothing, performance and style of Metric's lead singer, Emily Haines, is also the basis for the lead singer of the Clash at Demonhead, Envy Adams. Brie Larson, who portrays Envy Adams, said that she "had no idea [her] body could move that way" when talking at the UK premiere about her stage performance of the song. The music journalist Janelle Sheetz wrote that "Larson's performance is similar enough to [Haines's] but with an attitude appropriate for [Envy Adams]". Envy Adams' film fashion also reverse-influenced the comics: the last graphic novel was in development while the film was being made, and O'Malley said that, though he "would try and distance [him]self from [the actors' interpretations]", he also "gave Envy Adams one of Brie Larson's actual outfits" in the comic.

Larson as Envy Adams provides the vocals for "Black Sheep" in the film, while the soundtrack features a version of the song with Haines as lead singer, per the band's request; Larson was a professional singer and has performed in some of her other films. Metric had been performing the song at their concerts since 2007, but had not released it before the film. Todd Martens of the Los Angeles Times said that "Envy is a caricature of Haines" and likewise, according to Haines, that "'Black Sheep' is essentially a caricature of Metric", like a song emulating their most distinct aspects. Godrich agreed, and added that it "was perfect for this film [because] it's not Metric. It's a shadow of Metric." Routh, who plays the Clash at Demonhead's bass player Todd Ingram, said "[he] can play ["Black Sheep"] really well", but the film did not use his instrumental, only Larson's vocals over Metric, who had re-recorded the track to make it more sinister. Routh spent "three or four months" learning to play bass for the film.

The song performed by Matthew Patel was written by Dan the Automator and performed by Satya Bhabha in the film. Bhabha said that they "[recorded] it at Capitol Records Studio 2, which is where Frank Sinatra recorded a lot of his stuff. And there was Ray Charles' piano in the room", explaining that the musical history helped him to finish the recording.

Wright said that the film's tonal changes in line with representing the different book parts, and for its fight scenes, were treated like a musical film, saying:

We thought it should play out like a musical in a way in terms of the fights are not dissimilar to the songs. I always thought there were a lot of martial arts films that were like musicals, so we wanted to take that further. Ya know, in a Gene Kelly film when he performs an amazing routine, at the end of the scene no one goes, 'Oh my god, that was fucking amazing!' The song is about something, and then there might be some dialogue at the end that is also about that theme. And that's kind of how this works where people have these huge fights – and it's kind of like how it is in the books – where everything goes back to normal, and there's a little reaction to what just happened, but there's no sort of mourn the dead.

He also said that some music videos were made of song performances, including some of Sex Bob-omb and the sole the Clash at Demonhead performance, shooting the entire song even though they would not be used in complete form in the film; he said they were so good he wanted to get them all recorded so they had it. The Blu-ray home release includes special features, with music videos of the complete performances of Sex Bob-omb's "Garbage Truck", "Threshold", and "Summertime", and the Clash at Demonhead's "Black Sheep". The music video of "Black Sheep" had also been included as a bonus feature with the soundtrack pre-order on iTunes.

Music from the Legend of Zelda video game series is used to open the film, in sound effects, and in a dream sequence. To get permission to use the music, Edgar Wright sent a clip of the film and wrote a letter to Nintendo of America that described the music as "like nursery rhymes to a generation". There are other sound effects and clips from other video games used in the film. Zeitlin Wu writes that the film pushes the graphic novel's video game elements to the limit by being able to include such sound effects.

=== Visual effects ===
The film is described as having an "inimitable look" of manga and video game (particularly 16-bit) iconography with bright colors and graphics mixed into the live-action; visual effects supervisor Frazer Churchill described the look as "tricky" to achieve, calling the film's style and appeal "very high-tech images with a very low-fi feel". Churchill was interviewed by MTV in August 2010 about the effects in the film. He noted that some of the work was more complex because of a shooting ethic of Wright's: that there should be a physical representation of any post-production effects, saying that "whenever the image flashes in the finished shots – every punch, sword clash or something – those were actually flashes [...] on-set with photo flashbulbs [...] and then [they] add [...] flash with CGI. When someone dies and bursts into coins, [they would] empty buckets of silver Mylar so the actors had something to react to."

Churchill described the first fight (Scott vs. Matthew Patel) as "the most challenging". He says this was because of the technical elements involved, like the computer-generated Bollywood dance and requiring blue screen work, matte painting and many stunts. The scene also incorporates the video game scrolling background effect, which was filmed by a second unit over a full day. Churchill added that one moment in particular required much work: "When Scott jumps off the stage into that manga-esque vortex, that's made up of motion picture photography done on-set, digital still photography, and graphics and speed lines drawn by hand from what [Oscar Wright] gave us". Storyboard artist Oscar Wright (also brother of director Edgar Wright) noted that the introduction of Patel was used "to convey the kind of energy [they] wanted, and explore how [they] would introduce the 2D graphic elements".

The third fight (Scott vs. Todd Ingram) had to be adapted from the comic material more creatively, as Todd's superpowers are shown in print by rings, which were handled by the VFX team. Churchill explains that they took inspiration from the old RKO Pictures logo of a transmitting tower. To imitate this, they "made the rings feel uneven and have these optical aberrations with color bursts". In this fight, Scott also gets punched through several walls, which was achieved with camera set-ups. The movement away from Todd is shown from tight and wide camera shots, with Cera as Scott being pulled on a rig in the room. The image of Cera was then merged with a digital Scott and a stunt double, who do go through walls.

The disappearing superpower used by Roxy in the film was achieved by a blue screen, with actress Whitman being digitally erased, but there was white smoke and flashbulbs used on the set to mark the appearances. Black smoke was added in digitally, while lens flares were done manually by "just flashing different lights at the camera" for a day to create material. Roxy appears in the fourth fight, where she uses a bladed weapon. Churchill says that Whitman learned how to ribbon dance and used a pink ribbon in the choreography, which was digitally replaced with the weapon.

Some of the storyboard for the Scott vs. the Katayanagi Twins fight

A new piece of software was written to produce elements of the fifth fight (Scott vs. the Katayanagi Twins); Andrew Whitehurst developed what Churchill called the "Wave Form Generator", and the visual effects team worked with music producer Godrich so they could transform different elements of the music into animations and create visual music. Churchill explained that "the software would convert these sound stems into animation data, so when the band is playing, the graphics and the dragons are moving in time with the music." This fight was storyboarded by Oscar Wright without any comic reference as the film overtook the publication of the books. The 'audio demons', fighting monsters powered by the music in the film, were then created on-set by Churchill using weather balloons.

For the climax fight against Gideon, a pyramid tower resembling one from Super Mario Bros. was filmed on for a week, with Churchill saying it often got hot due to the light effects being used, including the flashbulbs and red lights to represent fire on Scott's sword. The scene also used a blue screen and many stunt performers. Oscar Wright storyboarded the entire sequence except for Gideon's glitching at the end, which Edgar Wright thought of during editing and was created entirely in post-production. Edgar Wright also noted that the pyramid tower fight scene was the slowest piece he had ever filmed, saying: "So we were raring along at this amazing pace. And then there was this final set piece on a pyramid. Suddenly, we slowed down to doing ten shots in a day, which is very slow for me. I sat there on top of this pyramid, looking down at these enormous platforms being maneuvered around and I thought, '[Whose] idea was this?' And it was mine!"

Before directing fight scenes with visual effects, Wright consulted with director friends with more experience, including Quentin Tarantino, Guillermo del Toro, and Sam Raimi.

=== Title sequence ===
Frames from the title sequence

The opening title sequence was designed by Richard Kenworthy of Shynola, and was inspired by drawn-on-film animation. The sequence also begins with an 8-bit version of the Universal title slate and music, which Art of the Title calls the film's "amuse-bouche" and which was designed by Oscar Wright.

Oscar Wright says the 8-bit Universal logo idea was an early decision in production, and that he treated it "like some crappy low-res, low frame-rate FMV you might find at the start of some of those games" from the start. Creating the title slate involved separating the letters of 'Universal' and making them appear pixelated, using a matching spinning globe graphic by film animators VooDooDog, and reducing the frame rate to four seconds (rather than one) so that it appeared "steppy"; an 8-bit version of the accompanying music was also added, which Oscar Wright said "really seals the deal".

Edgar Wright got the idea to have the sequence from Quentin Tarantino after screening an early cut of the film for him. Tarantino told him that the film "needed a title sequence at the start to let people settle in and hint more about what we were about to see". The original opening sequence had the film's title shown over the long living room band shot that comes before the title sequence, which Edgar Wright said was one of the first scenes to be storyboarded, with the cast credits at the end of the film. After an early mockup of the title sequence on AVID, they approached Shynola to create it, as the film's graphic artists (Oscar Wright and Double Negative) were too occupied with the other effects in the film at this point in production and Edgar Wright was familiar with their work.

The AVID animatic, a black-and-white sketch animation with waveform graphics, was described by Edgar Wright as already "giving the film more of a sense of occasion and a very distinct break between the prologue and the first scene that moves the story forward". At this stage, they had also chosen Beck's "loudest soundtrack song" to play over the title sequence.

Kenworthy spoke of his references for the design:

You can't study animation and not be well-versed in Len Lye, Oskar Fischinger, Stan Brakhage, and Norman McLaren. We went back and re-watched those films and they were still full of life. We got excited about projecting such vivid imagery on the big screen, in front of an audience who most likely hadn't experienced that work.

Shynola was also given a selection of references from Edgar Wright, who described the brief as "2001 meets Sesame Street" and showed them the title sequence of Faster, Pussycat! Kill! Kill!, which used drawn-on optical tracks. As with traditional drawn-on-film animation, Kenworthy traced and painted the images. Wright provided musical references as well, saying that they "wanted to visualize the music and have every graphic, symbol, and subliminal image in time with the music — a hypnotic barrage of colour, light, and music. The idea was to have it as if the animation is a manifestation of how cool the music is in Knives' head. That's why [they] end the sequence on her watching, the titles are like her brain is exploding with how cool the track is."

The brief also requested that the opening sequence not use any of the comic artwork, to not spoil the film, so Kenworthy pitched "an 8-bit epileptic eye-fight" and created a mood film using geometric patterns and visual effects from manga; Edgar Wright requested that it should have less overt video game references. Shynola then worked with the music concept, Kenworthy saying that they "hit on making a visual representation of [Sex Bob-omb's] slightly amateurish, raw, garage-y sound. Something that had the feel of a live performance. A lively, colourful, in-your-face scratch film seemed a perfect fit." Working with Edgar Wright more, they chose to have a visual representation of each character and to scratch the appropriate number of 'X' marks for the actors who played each of the evil exes.

As the film was nearing completion, Shynola had a short time frame to finish the title sequence, so they worked on syncing the sequence and the music digitally at first, visualizing final adjustments before scratching onto sheets of acetate film. From each sheet of acetate, one second of footage was produced. Kenworthy said that after producing the images, they would "deliberately kick [each sheet] around the floor a bit to pick up a lot of dirt, scratches, and hairs".

Printing the sequence involved putting each sheet into a high-resolution negative scanner and cutting it down into individual frames before printing onto 35 mm movie film. There was also difficulty with the color printing, with most of the colors they wanted to use being "illegal". During the printing process, Kenworthy added parts of a scratch film he had made at college, which had been used when scanning to check color accuracy.

ComicsAlliance calls the title sequence "just the first in a memorable series of seamless mash-ups of graphics, film and animation that beautifully translate the spirit of Bryan Lee O'Malley's graphic novels to the screen". Art of the Title describes the sequence as "visual napalm", with Bleeding Cool saying it is "quite wonderful". Jade Budowski of Decider writes that "with its rapid-fire introductory scene and the ensuing vibrant animated title sequence, [the film] wastes no time in sucking you into [its] world".

=== Easter eggs ===
The film includes several easter eggs alluding to the comics or for foreshadowing. Fleischer noted that though the comic and film have Scott and Wallace's apartment at 65A Albert Avenue (filmed at 65 Alberta Avenue), there is a reference to O'Malley's own old apartment at 27 Alberta Avenue as the address on the Amazon delivery slip Scott signs. Fleischer also points out the blinking 'L' on a Flight Centre sign on Manning Avenue, which he writes is a warning that a fight is about to happen. Wright said, before the film came out, that a T-shirt of Plumtree, the band that originated the name 'Scott Pilgrim', would feature in the film. Other T-shirts Scott wears include one for The Smashing Pumpkins, a band sharing his initials; one with the bass guitar logo from the Rock Band game series; and one that references Fantastic Four, which he wears after defeating Lucas, played by Evans, who at the time was best known for his role as the Human Torch in the Fantastic Four movies. Scott's changing T-shirts often match Ramona's changing hair color throughout the film.

There are also references to other media, particularly gaming and comics, with Den of Geek's James Hunt compiling a list of several, including Scott's X-Men patch seen as he rips it from his coat; the Legend of Zelda Triforce represented by Gideon's initials in the film and title sequence (shown above) and the Dark Link-inspired Nega-Scott; Envy's band being named after the 1990 game The Clash at Demonhead (as well as the Clash); Kim dressing in Japanese Gothic Lolita fashion for the final battle as a point of humor; the scene that was shot, performed, and edited entirely like a Seinfeld episode; and using the "this is a league game" line from The Big Lebowski. /Film notes that slow-motion broken glass falling and reflecting Ramona and Roxy as they fight resembles the character selection screen of Street Fighter, and that the Chaos Theater and Sex Bob-omb's forced labor is a reference to EarthBound.

Like the Clash at Demonhead, the other band names reference video games: Sex Bob-omb to the Bob-ombs in Mario franchise games, and Crash and the Boys to a game called Crash 'n' the Boys: Street Challenge. According to actress Larson, The Clash at Demonhead was the first game that O'Malley owned.

Scott playing the bassline of what he calls "Final Fantasy II" is also considered an easter egg; he plays the bassline from the game Final Fantasy IV, but this game was released as Final Fantasy II outside of Japan in the 1990s because the second and third installments had not been released internationally at the time.

In her adaptation discussion, Zeitlin Wu notes that in the graphic novel, the fourth fight (Scott vs. Roxy Richter) was a frame-for-frame recreation of the introduction to Ninja Gaiden, and in the film, this same frame-for-frame remake is used as the introduction of the final fight against Gideon.

== Release ==
=== Screenings and box office ===
A Scott Pilgrim vs. the World panel was featured in Hall H at San Diego Comic-Con on July 22, 2010; after the panel, Wright invited selected members of the audience for a screening of the film, which was followed by a performance of "Black Sheep" by Metric. The film was then shown at the Fantasia Festival in Montreal on July 27, 2010, and was also featured at Movie-Con III in London on August 15, 2010. It formally premiered in Canada in Toronto on August 13, 2010; Plumtree, who had broken up years earlier, got back together for a show at the event.

The film received a wide release in North America on August 13, 2010, opening in 2,818 theaters. It finished fifth on its first weekend of release with a total of $10.5 million ($15.5 million when adjusted for inflation), and by its second weekend of release had dropped to the bottom of the top ten. The Wall Street Journal described this as "disappointing", and Ben Fritz of the Los Angeles Times said that the film appeared to be a "major financial disappointment". Universal acknowledged their disappointment at the opening weekend earnings, saying they had "been aware of the challenges of broadening this film to a mainstream audience"; regardless, the studio's spokesman said Universal was "proud of this film and our relationship with the visionary and creative filmmaker Edgar Wright [...] [Wright] has created a truly unique film that is both envelope pushing and genre bending and when examined down the road will be identified as an important piece of filmmaking."

In the UK, the film premiered at Leicester Square (the Odeon) on August 19, 2010, before it opened on August 25 in 408 cinemas, finishing second on its opening weekend with £1.6 million. In Italy, it had evening screenings in cinemas for a week before being shifted to the afternoon slots; one scholar has suggested that the "flawed marketing plan" that saw it framed as a children's film was the reason for its poor box office performance. In Japan, the film premiered during the Yubari International Fantastic Film Festival on February 26, 2011, as an official selection. It was released to the rest of the country on April 29, 2011.

=== Marketing ===
When Universal Pictures started the promotion cycle for Scott Pilgrim Vs. The World, they clearly didn't know which angle to push. To be fair, the movie has got a lot going on.
– Nina Corcoran, Stereogum

I'll speak for myself and not for the studio. But, for me, to have someone like Edgar [Wright] come with a project like Scott Pilgrim, and knowing what his vision was going to be, both sonically and visually, it was super-exciting. It's what gets a marketer very excited – doing something original and bold and, as it turns out I think, ahead of its time.
– Michael Moses, former Universal Pictures co-President of Marketing

On March 25, 2010, the first teaser trailer was released. A second trailer featuring music by The Ting Tings, LCD Soundsystem, Be Your Own Pet, Cornelius, Blood Red Shoes, and The Prodigy was released on May 31, 2010. In August 2010, an interactive trailer was released, with viewers able to click at points in the video to see production facts. The theatrical poster, noted in Liam Burke's book, "mirrored the opening image of the graphic novel", as a signal to its origins; Burke says that the film's marketing campaign was "typical of the strategy of engaging fans and building a core audience with promotional material that displays comic book continuity".

Cera stated he felt the film was "a tricky one to sell" and that he did not "know how you convey that movie in a marketing campaign. [He could] see it being something that people are slow to discover." Poor marketing has been blamed for the film's lack of box-office success, especially when compared with its positive critical reception and popularity.

At the 2010 MTV Movie Awards in June, the first clip of the film was released, featuring Scott facing Lucas Lee in battle. At this screening, Pill revealed that Kim and Scott's past relationship would be explored in other media, saying there "will be a little something-something that will air on Adult Swim". The animated short, Scott Pilgrim vs. the Animation, produced by Titmouse Inc., adapts the opening prologue of the second Scott Pilgrim book and was aired on Adult Swim on August 12, 2010, a day prior to the film's theatrical release, later being released on their website.

Also tying in with the release of the film was a video game partly based on it, Scott Pilgrim vs. the World: The Game. The game was released for PlayStation Network on August 10, 2010, and on Xbox Live Arcade on August 25, being met with mostly positive reviews. A re-release of the game titled Scott Pilgrim vs. the World: The Game – Complete Edition, and comprising the main game as well as downloadable content centering on Knives and Wallace, was released on January 14, 2021. The game is published by Ubisoft and developed by Ubisoft Montreal and Ubisoft Chengdu, featuring animation by Paul Robertson and original music by Anamanaguchi.

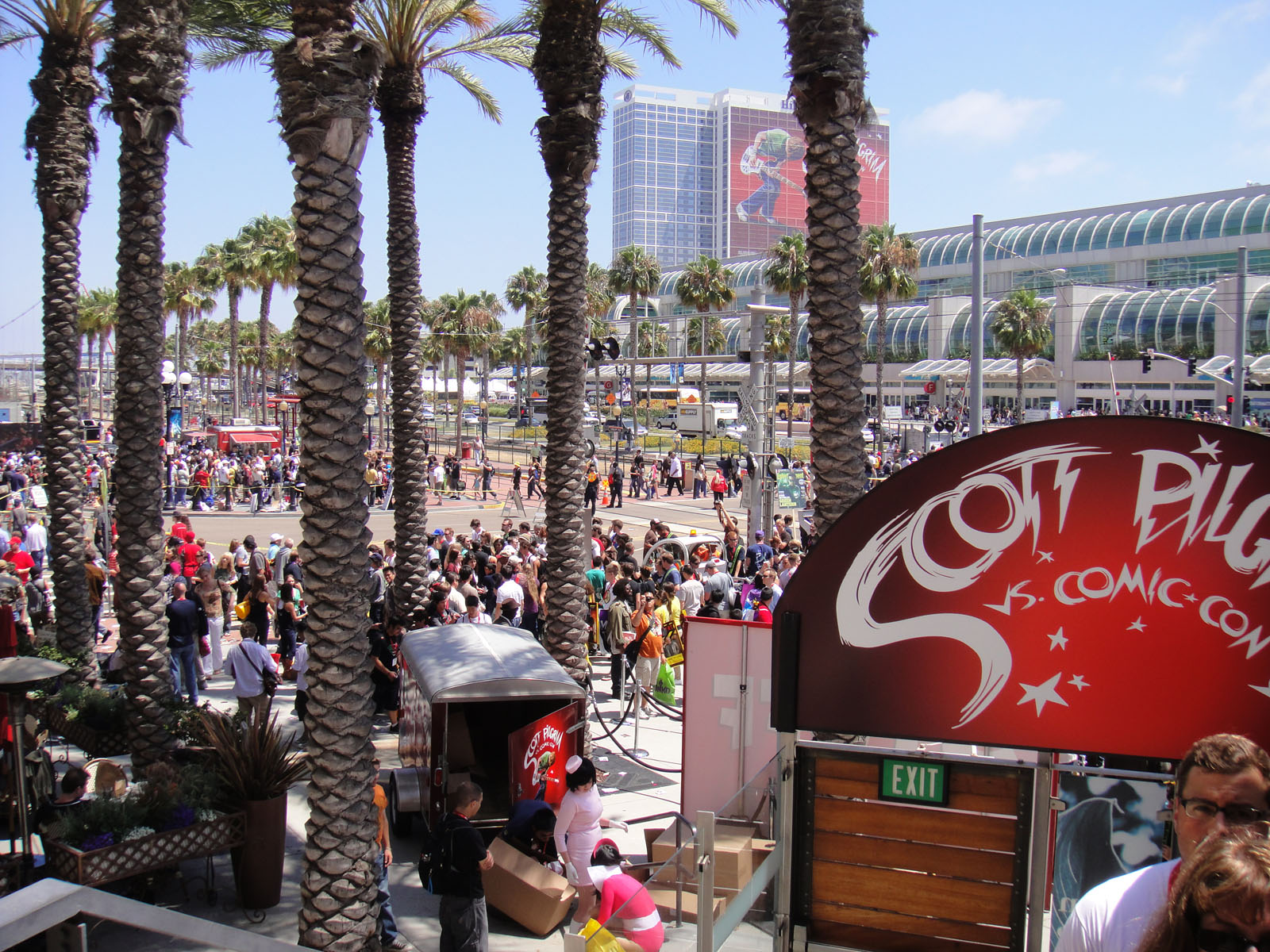
The Scott Pilgrim Experience at the 2010 San Diego Comic-Con was a popular event, taking up blocks outside the convention center.

The San Diego Comic-Con panel was a popular event, with Winstead reflecting that "at Comic-Con it felt like it was the biggest film of all time". Three of the ensemble cast members – Evans, Simmons and Larson – were missing from the Comic-Con panel; Edgar Wright's frequent collaborators Simon Pegg and Nick Frost made brief appearances, with Wright joking about them not being in this film. Cera dressed as Captain America at the panel, in reference to Evans' absence due to commitments for Captain America: The First Avenger. The 2010 Comic-Con was the first time it used giant hotel wraps to advertise, which can be seen from landing airplanes; Scott Pilgrim vs. Comic-Con wrapped the Hilton Bayfront for the event. Outside the convention hall was also a 'Scott Pilgrim Experience' fair, which included merchandise and copious free garlic bread.

=== Home media ===
Scott Pilgrim vs. the World was released on DVD and Blu-ray in North America on November 9, 2010, and in the United Kingdom on December 27, 2010.

The DVD features include four audio commentaries (from director Wright, co-writer Bacall, and author O'Malley; Wright and director of photography Pope; Cera, Schwartzman, Winstead, Wong, and Routh; and Kendrick, Plaza, Culkin, and Webber); 21 deleted, extended, and alternate scenes, including the original ending (where Scott ends up with Knives), with commentary; bloopers; photo galleries; and a trivia subtitle track.

The Blu-ray release includes all DVD features, plus other special features, including alternate footage, six featurettes, production blogs, Scott Pilgrim vs. the Animation, trailers and TV spots, and storyboard picture-in-picture, as well as a DVD and a digital copy of the film. The "Ultimate Japan Version" Blu-ray disc includes a commentary track that features Wright and Shinya Arino. It also includes footage of Wright and Cera's publicity tour through Japan and a round-table discussion with Japanese film critic Tomohiro Machiyama. It was released on September 2, 2011.

In its first week of release in the US, the DVD sold 190,217 copies, earning $3,422,004 in revenue, and by 2011 the film had earned $27,349,933 from United States home media sales; it had grossed over $29 million as of 2018. It reached the top of the UK Blu-ray charts in its first week of release.

Simon Abrams reviewed the DVD and Blu-ray releases, writing that the DVD image quality is good and "you wouldn't really be able to notice that there's anything wrong" unless you had seen the Blu-ray version, which is in cinema quality. He adds that "the richly layered audio mix is, however, just as great on the [DVD] as it is on the Blu-ray edition [and] the 5.1 surround English track flawlessly replicates the way the film sounded when it was theatrically released." Abrams noted that some of the bonus features are not particularly interesting, but that the audio commentaries were entertaining and informative.

=== 10th anniversary ===
The film received extensive coverage, a reunion, and a planned re-release for its 10th anniversary in 2020. Sarah El-Mahmoud of CinemaBlend wrote that they were seeing "so much Scott Pilgrim content – it must be a modern classic or something like that!", before acknowledging its improved status after the disappointing box office, and Mashable said that "over the past decade, Scott Pilgrim has enjoyed admiration and salience beyond the wildest dreams of its box-office competitors". Entertainment Weekly created retrospective coverage for the anniversary, including interviewing several stars and people involved in the production of the film. Wright said in the piece that he is "incredibly proud of the movie. The fact that you're not doing a 10th-anniversary article about The Expendables says it all".

In May 2020, Wright announced plans to screen the film again in theatres for its 10th anniversary, some time following the COVID-19 pandemic. The re-release is to be 4K and in collaboration with Dolby Cinema, and had been planned for August 2020, but was delayed indefinitely due to the pandemic. In August 2020, Odeon Cinemas revealed that it would be giving the re-release a wide release at all its UK locations from August 21, 2020. The cast of the film also reunited remotely in May 2020 to record Scott Pilgrim Vs the World Water Crisis, a video read-through of the script as a fundraiser for the charity Water For People. Earlier in the year, Cera and Pill had separately suggested a reunion and re-release were being planned for the anniversary. Screen Rant noted that, since the film became much more popular after its initial release, it could become a bigger theatrical success than it had been in 2010.

The theatrical re-release was later rescheduled for North American Dolby Cinema theaters for April 30, 2021, and the week following. Additionally, Wright announced that an Ultra HD Blu-ray release of the film would follow the theatrical re-release, but did not give an estimated release date.

On May 20/21, 2020 (depending on time zone), the Academy of Motion Picture Arts and Sciences hosted a watch party for the film. During the livestream, Wright gave a commentary with trivia about the film and various cast members, including Evans, Plaza, Whitman, Routh, Larson, Wong, and Webber, all joined him at different points to add their own. Collider noted that the availability of much of the cast, invited to take part by the academy, may have been made possible by pandemic lockdowns.

The Scott Pilgrim Vs the World Water Crisis video was premiered on Entertainment Weekly's EW.com and YouTube channel at 1:00 p.m. EDT on July 20, 2020. Most of the main cast were present; Evans appeared to read his part but was absent for most of the video, while Larson, Simmons and Culkin did not appear and their parts were read by Kendrick, Bhabha and screenwriter Bacall respectively. Throughout the stream, O'Malley, who also appeared along with Wright, drew character images as prizes for donations to Water For People. Cera recreated the sketch of Ramona that Scott shows to Comeau in the film to be given away, too.

== Analysis ==
Transmedia storytelling is essentially delivering a narrative using a blend of different creative techniques. Scott Pilgrim vs. the World throws in little details of unrealistic sounds, imagery, and on-screen captions. These wouldn't work in just any movie, including other comic adaptations. These additions are what makes Scott Pilgrim such a true comic book adaptation. Even if you'd never heard of the source material, you'd be able to feel the comic book influences.

— Meghan Hale, Comic Years

Scott Pilgrim vs. the World has been widely discussed as invoking a transmedia narrative, using the graphic novel platform, and video game and comic book conventions, within the film. John Bodner explained that "the film becomes an adaptation of a text that is, in many ways, itself a cultural adaptation calling attention to its own source material in its overt employment of many techniques derived from the aesthetic of comic books". Zeitlin Wu wrote how the film "[pays] homage to comics, video games, and the overlaps between the two", and noted that its process of adaptation is unique in how it has made a comic book movie that is not realistic, staying true to the original form. In his chapter, "Scott Pilgrim's Precious Little Texts: Adaptation, Form, and Transmedia Co-creation", Bodner noted several elements that create the film as transmedial, describing its references to the comic book and video game media.

With unconventional use of comic book markers, Wright disrupts the realism and diegesis of the film, destabilizing boundaries of form and "pushing their transmediality to the next level". Bodner, Zeitlin Wu, and Burke noted that Wright, with the film, became one of the only directors since the 1960s to use, in Bodner's words, "the comment box, marks (action lines), and onomatopoeia text as sound effects" in a filmic work, using such techniques both conventionally (labeling time and place) and unconventionally for the medium. Burke described the use as "self-reflexive". Zeitlin Wu said that "unlike the 1960s Batman, the use of visual onomatopoeia in Scott Pilgrim seamlessly merges reality and illusion, which seems apt for a storyline in which the two are indistinguishable", using the comic book words within the film as part of the story rather than alongside it.

Burke wrote further on the use of written sound effects as amplifying meaning, saying that "there are areas in which comics' visualized sound trumps cinema's soundtrack", engaging with Robert C. Harvey to agree that "word and picture can be coupled to reveal the hero's cheery bravado even in the very midst of thundering action". Bodner recognised two scenes ("the first battle of the bands and Lucas Lee's 'grind' down the rail") where Wright uses high-volume noise to recreate the silent form of comic books, as in a film the loudness drowns out any other sound and requires the use of text in the same way that the purely visual comic book form does. Burke also noted the benefit of visual text when a sound would be less or not effective due to "ambient noise" in the film.

An example of spatial remediation in the film to simulate comic book panels, with three simultaneous but not spatially-continuous images shown and framed with black "gutters" (as in Bodner, Zeitlin Wu, and Ferhle.)

Bodner gave the film a postmodern reading because of its mixed form, also noting that Wright seems to alter the film form to allow for storytelling executed in a similar way to how story and movement is achieved in static comic book sequences. Zeitlin Wu acknowledged that many of the film's storyboards were taken from the comic panels. Bodner wrote that Wright transcodes the "construction of comic panels" into the film; Wright himself has said that "a lot of people have mentioned [...] how it feel[s] like reading a comic book", a sentiment echoed by Zeitlin Wu. Bodner suggested that this is created by transition techniques – and that the techniques that produce this are Wright's own, building from his work in Shaun of the Dead and Hot Fuzz – that work by "replicating [the panel's] companion – the 'gutter'." Wright recreated this element of outside space in comics in the film form by making "cuts that are exceedingly quick or that open into shots that displace conventional temporal logic (anticontinuity editing), or with cuts that use a purposefully barely visible wipe effect", and by using "blackouts, which function as brief moments of dead space" between certain frames.

Zeitlin Wu and Bodner both discussed the use of comic book form within the film medium as affecting the viewer's perception of continuity and time, particularly highlighting the dream sequences. Zeitlin Wu wrote that, in the first such sequence, "Wright maintains the fragmentation of the comics medium by retaining the divisions between the original panels: the screen fades to black after each frame, an attempt to mimic the simultaneously diachronic and synchronic experience of reading comics". Bodner also discussed the non-naturalistic temporality of the sequence of images when Scott orders a package, writing that they better represent comic panels where temporality can be otherwise deduced by the reader. He added that, as pastiche, this scene serves a dual function to foreshadow the magical realism that will appear.

In his chapter "Tell It Like a Game: Scott Pilgrim and Performative Media Rivalry", Jeff Thoss suggested that the transmedial cues of the film serve best "as a way to illuminate the specific narrative affordances and limitations of comics, films, and computer games". Building on Thoss, Fehrle examined the remediation (Bolter and Grusin) of signifiers of video game as well as other visual media genres and their conspicuousness. He also noted the use of split screen, considering it both a reference to videogame multiplayer modes and 1990s television, and a technique to draw attention to the mediality of film "by making visible the impact of an editor, a role which in the dominant continuity editing system is regarded as one that should be kept hidden".

== Reception ==
=== Critical reception ===
Scott Pilgrim vs. the World received positive reviews from critics. The review aggregation website Rotten Tomatoes reported that out of 270 critic reviews, 83% of them were positive, with an average rating of 7.6/10. The site's consensus states: "Its script may not be as dazzling as its eye-popping visuals, but Scott Pilgrim vs. the World is fast, funny, and inventive" Metacritic assigned the film a weighted average score of 69 out of 100, based on 38 critics, indicating "generally favorable" reviews. Audiences surveyed by CinemaScore gave the film an "A−" grade on a scale from A to F.

Peter Debruge of Variety gave the film a mixed review, referring to it as "an example of attention-deficit filmmaking at both its finest and its most frustrating", saying it was economical with its storytelling and successfully incorporated the many big fight set pieces, but missed opportunities to build Scott and Ramona's relationship. David Edelstein of New York magazine also wrote a mixed review, agreeing that Scott "hardly seems worthy of Winstead's Ramona" and saying he thought that "the parade of super-villain exes [...] is like a forced march; [he] felt [he]'d had [his] fill of the fights and there were still five exes to go". Michael Phillips gave a generally positive review, but did agree that the number of fights holds the film back, writing that "Seven sounds like a lot. It is, in fact, two or three too many." Kirk Honeycutt of The Hollywood Reporter wrote a largely negative review, finding the film "a discouragingly limp movie in which nothing is at stake. A character can 'die,' then simply rewind video and come back to life. Or change his mind about his true love and then change it again. Scott Pilgrim's battle isn't against the world; it's against an erratic moral compass." Cindy White at IGN gave a positive review, praising Wright and the film's style extensively, though she did mention that "the middle drags a bit and the ending isn't all [she] hoped it would be."

A. O. Scott, who made the film a New York Times "critics pick", also reviewed it positively, suggesting it was "the best video game movie ever". Slant Magazine's Nick Schager also gave the film a positive review, awarding it 3.5 stars out of 4, with colleague Simon Abrams calling it "the most visually exciting, funny, and emotionally involving studio-produced film of the year" and awarding 4 stars out of 5 in his DVD review.

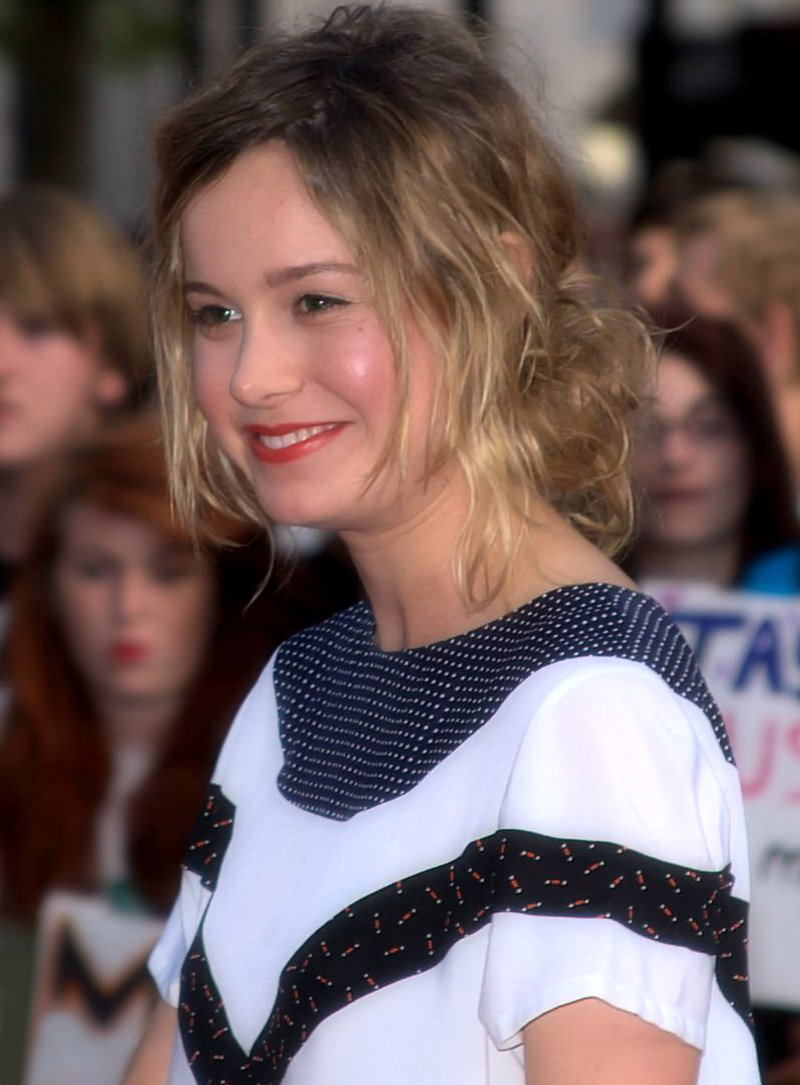
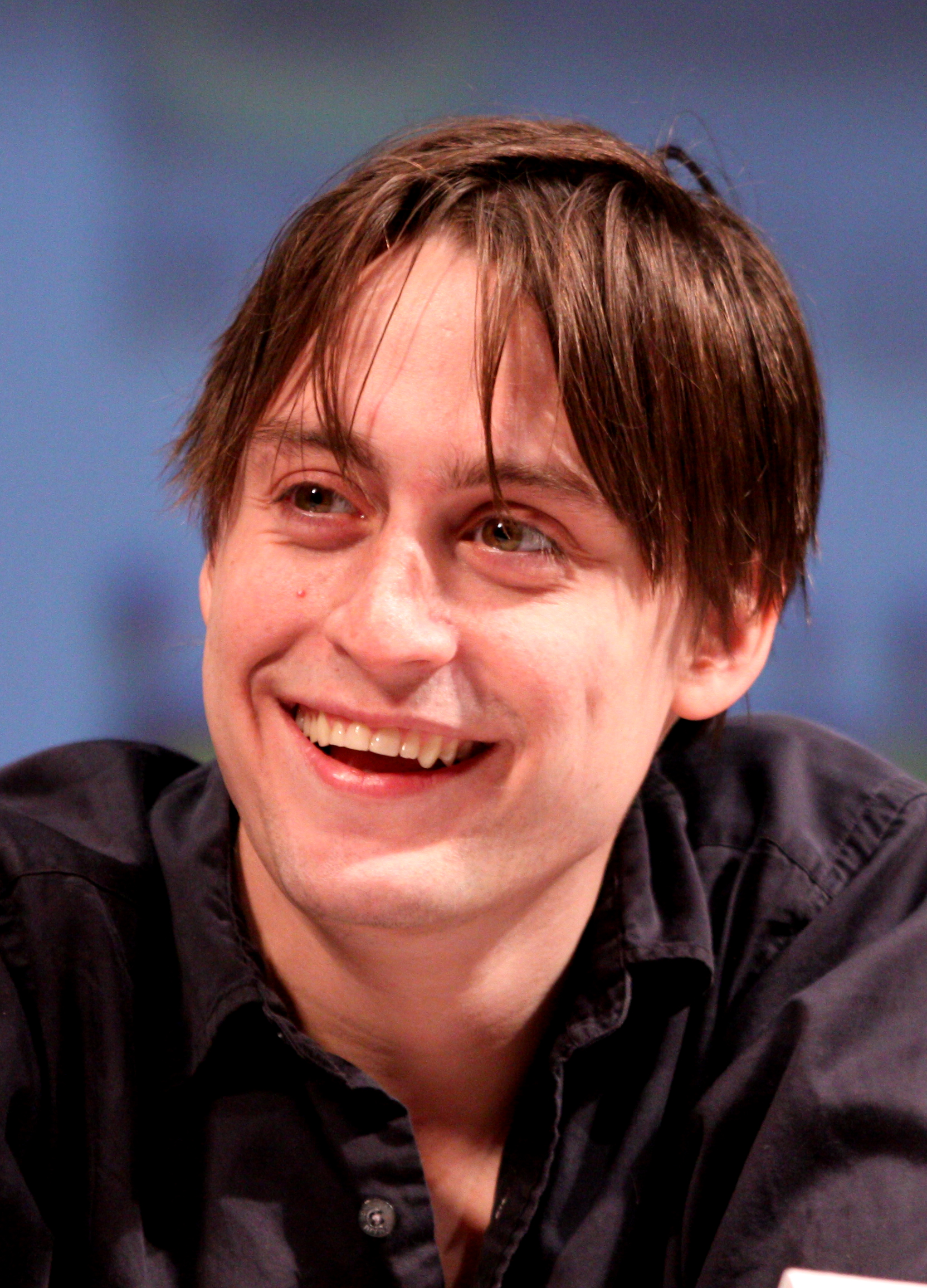
Brie Larson (pictured at the film's UK premiere) and Kieran Culkin (pictured at the San Diego Comic-Con panel) have been described as the film's "scene stealers", while reception to lead Michael Cera was mixed.

Debruge praised the ensemble cast and Wright's directing skills that make each of the many characters distinctive. However, he criticized Cera's performance, saying that "his comic timing is impeccable, [but] he's finally played the wilty wallflower one too many times". Edelstein found the film's biggest issue to be Cera's acting, saying that "a different lead might have kept you laughing and engaged. Cera doesn't come alive in the fight scenes the way Stephen Chow does in [...] surreal martial-arts comedies [like] Kung Fu Hustle", with Honeycutt dissecting the storytelling and determining that "Cera doesn't give a performance that anchors the nonsense" of the film. Conversely, A.O. Scott wrote that "somehow [Cera and Winstead] make it work" in selling the relationship without being a cliché, and Abrams said that the actors had "never looked this good, especially Cera", noting that "[his] performance is knowingly affected and self-absorbed throughout scenes depicting Scott and Knives's awkward dating" as the film deliberately plays up Scott's initial narcissism. Cera's delivery of the particular line "I was thinking we should break up, or whatever" has been reviewed as amusing and awkwardly realistic. White wrote that the actors playing Ramona's exes "all [seem] to be having a blast in their scenes". Brie Larson and Kieran Culkin have been frequently described as the film's scene stealers for their performances as Scott's ex, rock star Envy Adams, and Scott's roommate, the sarcastic Wallace Wells. Chris Evans and Brandon Routh have also been called scene stealers in some reviews.

As a negative, Debruge added that "anyone over 25 is likely to find [the film] exhausting, like playing chaperone at a party full of oversexed college kids", remarks echoed by Honeycutt, who called the film "juvenile" and thought "a wider audience among older or international viewers seems unlikely." White gave the film a positive rating of 8/10, saying it is "best suited for the wired generation and those of us who grew up on Nintendo and MTV. Its kinetic nature and quirky sensibilities might be a turnoff for some." Scott also found the youth elements appealing, writing that "there are some movies about youth that just make you feel old, even if you aren't [but] Scott Pilgrim vs. the World has the opposite effect. Its speedy, funny, happy-sad spirit is so infectious that the movie makes you feel at home in its world even if the landscape is, at first glance, unfamiliar." Abrams opened his review lamenting that "the sad thing about Scott Pilgrim vs. the World is that people assumed that because it embraced its niche-oriented demographic's interests, in its ad campaign and in its content, that it was destined for cult status and nothing more."

Schager wrote that Edgar Wright is an "inspired mash-up artist, and Scott Pilgrim vs. the World may be his finest hybridization to date", saying the film has become a "mêlée-heavy video game". Debruge also said that "style [...] becomes the level at which we must appreciate Wright's work", particularly noting the 8-bit Universal logo and the Seinfeld scene. White explains that, though the video game style and structure is non-realistic, "even the most outlandish elements flow naturally from the storytelling". The style was also compared to the comics. According to Phillips, "Edgar Wright understands the appeal of the original Bryan Lee O'Malley graphic novels [...] O'Malley's manga-inspired books combine utter banality with superhero hyperbole, [and] Wright, who is British, has taken it on and won. [The film] lives and breathes the style of the original books, with animated squiggles and hearts and stars filling out the frame in many individual shots." Edelstein opened his review by saying "Yes, this is how you bring a graphic novel to life onscreen!", elaborating that "[Wright takes the] Canadian mangas (in which the mundane meets the superheroic) and concocts a syntax all his own: part comic panel, part arcade video game".

Further comparing the film to the graphic novels, and discussing it as an adaptation, Honeycutt agrees that "Director/producer/co-writer Edgar Wright [...] has successfully reproduced the imagery and worldview of Bryan Lee O'Malley's graphic novel, itself a mash-up of ordinary characters lost in a world of manga, video games, music videos and comic book iconography." White writes that the elements of mash-up in the film's style creates "a pop-culture cocktail that is fun, funny and deliciously offbeat", praising Wright for "[making the comic book elements] work in the translation to live action, and [having] enough respect for O'Malley's work in the first place to try to capture that spirit; Scott agrees, saying that the success comes from its ingenuity in bringing the video game to the player's world, rather than the other way around, and so "the line between fantasy and reality is not so much blurred as erased, because the filmmakers create an entirely coherent, perpetually surprising universe". Abrams also notes that some of the comic elements work better in the film, like when Scott wakes up, followed by Wallace and Other Scott, because of the timing of the medium. He opines that Wright also managed to include additional scenes that further inform Scott's characterization and add humor to moments from the comics. Overall, in her 2020 retrospective review, Meghan Hale of Comic Years wrote that "[Scott Pilgrim vs. the World] doesn't just make for an adequate adaptation, but instead brings the story to life in a way that innovates the way we look at adaptations".

=== Popular response ===
After seeing the film at a test screening, the American director Kevin Smith said he was impressed by it, and that "it's spellbinding and nobody is going to understand what the fuck just hit them", adding Wright "is bringing a comic book to life". Smith also said that fellow directors Quentin Tarantino and Jason Reitman were "really into it". Carla Gillis, a writer for Now and former lead singer for the band Plumtree, also commented on the film, as her band's song "Scott Pilgrim" was the inspiration for O'Malley to create the series; Gillis felt the film carried the same positive yet bittersweet tone of the song. Several notable video game, film, and anime industry personalities also praised the film after it premiered in Japan, among them Hironobu Sakaguchi, Goichi Suda, Miki Mizuno, Tomohiko Itō and Takao Nakano.

In an editorial for Rotten Tomatoes, Nathan Rabin wrote that the film has a cult following, and in a 2015 Met Film School feature, Danny Kelly listed it as one of the six most underrated films ever, saying it is "a crime" that more people did not go to see it. A 2014 ranking by Den of Geek placed it third on their list of the 25 best underrated comic book films, with James Hunt writing that it "is easily better than any movie on this list. And for that matter, it's better than most movies not on this list"; he suggested it suffered at the box office due to poorly executed marketing and people becoming sick of Michael Cera. In 2020, Evans compared the fans of Scott Pilgrim to those of the Marvel Cinematic Universe, saying they were just as rabid and dedicated; in February 2020, reviewer Alani Vargas wrote that "it might not be so 'cult' today; if you bring the movie up to anyone now, odds are you'll get a very enthused response to it".

Musical artists were inspired by the film, including Lil Uzi Vert with their albums Lil Uzi Vert vs. the World and Lil Uzi Vert vs. the World 2, and single "Scott and Ramona". The music video for Australian band The Vines' single "Gimme Love" is an homage to Scott Pilgrim vs. the World, adopting the visual style of the movie's opening, and Kid Cudi sampled dialogue from the film on the song "She Knows This" from his album Man on the Moon III: The Chosen.

=== Accolades ===
Scott Pilgrim vs. the World has received many awards and nominations. It also made the final shortlist of seven films for nomination in the Best Visual Effects category at the 83rd Academy Awards, but did not receive a nomination. It won the Audience Award at the 2010 Lund International Fantastic Film Festival.

The film has been placed on several Top Ten Films of 2010 lists, including as number 1 by Harry Knowles, and on several lists by Empire.

In 2023, Barry Hertz of The Globe and Mail named the film as one of the 23 best Canadian comedy films ever made, acknowledging that it was not a Canadian production but writing that "the entire production, though, is just so explicitly Canadian – and so in love with a very specific 'Torontopia' era when it felt like anything was possible – that excluding it from this roundup would be treasonous."

In 2025, it was one of the films voted for the "Readers' Choice" edition of The New York Times' list of "The 100 Best Movies of the 21st Century," finishing at number 102.

== See also ==
- List of films featuring fictional films

== Works cited ==
=== Audio-visual media ===
- AP (November 11, 2010). 'Scott Pilgrim' Gets a New Life on DVD. Archived from the original on December 10, 2019 – via YouTube.
- Comic Con (2010a). Comic Con 2010: Scott Pilgrim vs. the World Panel – Part 2.
- Comic Con (July 30, 2010b). Comic Con 2010: Scott Pilgrim vs. the World Panel – Part 1. Archived from the original on August 1, 2019.
- Entertainment Weekly (July 20, 2020). 'Scott Pilgrim vs. The World' Reunion Table Read (Video).
- Larson, Brie (2010). Interview with Brie Larson for Scott Pilgrim VS The World. reelrave. Archived from the original on March 27, 2020 – via YouTube.
- Lil Uzi Vert (June 1, 2016). Lil Uzi Vert – Scott and Ramona [Official Audio] – via YouTube.
- Rockotier (June 13, 2018). Scott Pilgrim vs. the Easter Eggs.
- Scott Pilgrim The Movie (April 3, 2009). Blog One – Introduction – Scott Pilgrim Vs. The World. Archived from the original on November 5, 2011.
- TIFF Originals (April 7, 2018). Metric – "Black Sheep" (Edgar Wright's Scott Pilgrim vs. the World) | Lightbox Sessions | TIFF 2018. Archived from the original on August 6, 2019.
- Universal Pictures (October 27, 2010). Scott Pilgrim vs. the World – Behind the Scenes – Learning to Play Instruments. Archived from the original on October 18, 2012 – via YouTube.
- The Vines (March 31, 2011). The Vines – Gimme Love. Archived from the original on July 23, 2013 – via YouTube.
- Wright, Edgar (2009a). "Edgar Wright's photoblog". Bryan Lee O'Malley. Archived from the original on July 14, 2011.

=== Features ===
- Abrams, Simon (November 9, 2010). "DVD Review: Scott Pilgrim vs. the World". Slant Magazine. Archived from the original on March 6, 2020.
- Alston, Trey (March 13, 2020). "Lil Uzi Vert Drops Eternal Atake Deluxe Version, Featuring 14 New Songs". MTV. Archived from the original on March 14, 2020.
- Amaya, Erik (July 24, 2010). "CCI: Cast & Crew React to "Scott Pilgrim" screening". Comic Book Resources. Archived from the original on July 26, 2010.
- Aziz, Neha (August 12, 2010). "'Scott Pilgrim' matures; Michael Cera doesn't". The Daily Texan. Archived from the original on March 6, 2020.
- Bond, Tom (February 24, 2016). "Scene Stealers: Brie Larson in Scott Pilgrim vs The World". One Room With A View. Archived from the original on March 6, 2020.
- Brydon, Grant (2016). "Lil Uzi Vert channels Scott Pilgrim on new 'Lil Uzi Vs. The World' mixtape". RWD Magazine. Archived from the original on September 16, 2018.
- Calhoun, Dave (2010). "Michael Cera: Hollywood's go-to-geek". Time Out London. Archived from the original on December 1, 2017.
- Campbell, Christopher (August 25, 2010). "Alternate Endings for "Scott Pilgrim vs. the World": Which Would You Have Preferred?". IndieWire. Archived from the original on December 25, 2019.
- Carlick, Stephen (July 20, 2010). "Scott Pilgrim vs. The World Soundtrack Adds Beck Bonus Tracks with Deluxe Edition". Exclaim!.
- Cinema Blend (August 12, 2010). "Scott Pilgrim Music Video: Black Sheep Performed By Clash At Demonhead".
- Collis, Clark (August 10, 2010). "The making of 'Scott Pilgrim vs. The World': Edgar Wright and Michael Cera describe how they brought us the year's most hard-to-describe movie 'epic'". Entertainment Weekly. Archived from the original on March 6, 2020.
- Collis, Clark (June 24, 2020a). "Scott Pilgrim vs. the World: An oral history of Edgar Wright's super-powered cult classic". Entertainment Weekly. Archived from the original on June 25, 2020.
- Collis, Clark (June 26, 2020b). "'Scott Pilgrim' cast reunites for 10th anniversary script read-through for charity". Entertainment Weekly. Archived from the original on June 27, 2020.
- Collis, Clark (July 20, 2020c). "Watch 'Scott Pilgrim vs. the World' cast reunite for 10th anniversary charity table read". Entertainment Weekly. Archived from the original on July 20, 2020.
- Collis, Clark (August 13, 2020d). "'Scott Pilgrim vs. the World' oral history: Bonus level!!!". Entertainment Weekly. Archived from the original on August 14, 2020.
- Connelly, Brendon (January 3, 2011). "The Art Of The Scott Pilgrim Title Sequence". Bleeding Cool News And Rumors. Archived from the original on June 1, 2012.
- Corcoran, Nina (August 13, 2020). "'Scott Pilgrim Vs. The World' Is A 2010s Indie Rock Time Capsule". Stereogum. Archived from the original on August 14, 2020.
- Den of Geek (2010). "Scott Pilgrim Vs The World European premiere report". Archived from the original on March 7, 2020.
- Diaz, Eric (July 15, 2020). "SCOTT PILGRIM Cast Reunites for 10th Anniversary Table Read". Archived from the original on July 16, 2020.
- Ditzian, Eric (August 16, 2010). "'Scott Pilgrim': Inside The Creation Of The Six Fights". MTV News. Archived from the original on March 1, 2020.
- Dominguez, Noah (March 23, 2019). "Is Scott Pilgrim vs. the World the Greatest Ensemble of Comic Book Actors Ever?". CBR. Archived from the original on March 30, 2019.
- El-Mahmoud, Sarah (August 13, 2020). "As Scott Pilgrim Turns 10, Edgar Wright Praises Brie Larson's Audition Swagger". CinemaBlend. Archived from the original on August 14, 2020.
- Empire (December 24, 2010b). "Empire's Top 20 Films Of The Year". Archived from the original on February 16, 2020.
- Empire (December 30, 2010c). "The Best Movie Scenes In 2010". Archived from the original on February 16, 2020.
- Empire (January 13, 2020). "The 100 Greatest Movies of the 21st Century: 50–41". Archived from the original on February 9, 2020.
- Fischer, Russ (August 3, 2010). "Exclusive: First Video From the Scott Pilgrim Animated Short Produced by Adult Swim". SlashFilm. Archived from the original on August 5, 2010.
- Fleischer, David (November 9, 2010). "Reel Toronto: Scott Pilgrim vs. The World". Torontoist. Archived from the original on August 31, 2019.
- Goslin, Austen (March 24, 2021). "Scott Pilgrim is coming back to theaters with updated Dolby release". Polygon.
- Grierson, Tim (July 26, 2010). "Scott Pilgrim vs. The World". Screen Daily. Archived from the original on February 29, 2020.
- Hasty, Katie (March 31, 2010). "Preview new Beck songs in 'Scott Pilgrim' trailer". HitFix. Archived from the original on December 30, 2011.
- Hunt, James (December 20, 2010a). "The hidden treasures of Scott Pilgrim Vs The World". Den of Geek. Archived from the original on September 29, 2018.
- Hunt, James (January 30, 2014). "Top 25 underappreciated comic book movies". Den of Geek. Archived from the original on June 26, 2020.
- Kelly, Danny (2015). "6 of the most underrated films ever made". Met Film School. Archived from the original on March 6, 2020.
- Khouri, Andy (January 21, 2011). "The Art of the 'Scott Pilgrim Vs. The World' Title Sequence". ComicsAlliance. Archived from the original on February 20, 2019.
- Kit, Borys (January 20, 2009). "Exes mark spots in 'Pilgrim': Evans, Routh, Larson, others join ensemble of Uni's graphic novel pic". The Hollywood Reporter. Archived from the original on March 1, 2020.
- Laverde, Jake (August 16, 2020). "The Scott Pilgrim Movie Turned 10 Years Old, Where Are its Stars Now?". Game Rant.
- Lussier, Germain (September 20, 2010b). "/FILM – 'Scott Pilgrim vs. The World' Hits DVD and Blu-Ray November 9". Archived from the original on September 21, 2010.
- Lussier, Germain (October 28, 2010c). "Six Clips From The 'Scott Pilgrim vs. The World' Making of Documentary". / Film. Archived from the original on November 18, 2010.
- Lussier, Germain (January 18, 2011). "The Art of the Title Sequence: 'Scott Pilgrim vs. The World'". /Film. Archived from the original on January 2, 2018.
- Martens, Todd (July 15, 2010a). "Hero Complex for your Inner Fanboy". Los Angeles Times. Archived from the original on October 16, 2018.
- Martens, Todd (March 25, 2010b). "Rock 'n' roll: 'Scott Pilgrim' launches with Beck-scored trailer". Los Angeles Times. Archived from the original on March 29, 2010.
- Martens, Todd (August 14, 2010c). "Track-by-track: Beck, Nigel Godrich, Emily Haines, Bryan Lee O'Malley & Edgar Wright dissect the 'Scott Pilgrim' music". LA Times. Archived from the original on March 11, 2017.
- Mashable Entertainment (August 13, 2020). "What we'll always love about the idiots who got dumped in 'Scott Pilgrim vs. The World'". Mashable. Archived from the original on August 14, 2020.
- McMahon, James (August 18, 2010). "Edgar Wright: why the Scott Pilgrim soundtrack matters as much as the movie". The Guardian. ISSN 0261-3077.
- Medley, Mark (August 12, 2010). "Scott Pilgrim, by Plumtree: the song that started it all". National Post. Archived from the original on August 9, 2020.
- Movie Locations. "Filming Locations for Edgar Wright's adaptation of the graphic novels Scott Pilgrim Vs The World (2010)". The Worldwide Guide to Movie Locations. Archived from the original on August 7, 2019.
- O'Donnell, Patrick (August 13, 2020). "'Scott Pilgrim vs. the World' at 10: still the best comic book movie ever". NME. Archived from the original on August 14, 2020.
- Rabin, Nathan (March 22, 2017). "LEVEL UP: WHY SCOTT PILGRIM VS. THE WORLD ENDURES AS A CULT FAVORITE BEYOND ITS GEEK APPEAL". Rotten Tomatoes. Archived from the original on November 29, 2017.
- Rayner, Ben (August 8, 2009). "Toronto finally gets to play itself". Toronto Star. Archived from the original on February 15, 2011.
- Richards, Will (August 13, 2020). "Robert Pattinson had an 'intense' audition for 'Scott Pilgrim Vs. the World'". NME. Archived from the original on August 14, 2020.
- Riviello, Alex (June 30, 2017a). "All of the Video Game References in Scott Pilgrim". /Film. Archived from the original on December 12, 2018.
- Riviello, Alex (June 30, 2017b). "All of the Video Game References in Scott Pilgrim". /Film. Archived from the original on November 5, 2019.
- "Metric Announce Plans to Self-Release April Album 'Fantasies'". Rolling Stone. January 27, 2009. Archived from the original on March 1, 2020.
- "Beck Cuts 'Scott Pilgrim' Songs". Rolling Stone. August 19, 2010. Archived from the original on March 1, 2020.
- Rosen, Christopher (August 13, 2020). "How Scott Pilgrim vs. the World Assembled Its All-Star Cast". Vanity Fair. Archived from the original on August 14, 2020.
- Schneller, Johanna (August 23, 2012). "Hollywood goes Toronto". The Globe and Mail. Archived from the original on March 7, 2016.
- Sciretta, Peter (May 22, 2009). "Scott Pilgrim vs. The World Will End Differently Than The Graphic Novels". Archived from the original on December 15, 2017.
- Snyder, Gabriel (May 24, 2005). "'Pilgrim's' progresses". Variety. Archived from the original on February 10, 2008.
- Swerdloff, Alexis (July 16, 2010). "The Girls of Summer". Paper. Archived from the original on May 31, 2016.
- Tyner, Adam (October 31, 2010). "Scott Pilgrim vs. the World (Blu-ray)". DVD Talk. Archived from the original on December 8, 2017.
- Vargas, Alani (February 1, 2020). "Could a 'Scott Pilgrim' Sequel Happen? Mary Elizabeth Winstead Has Some Ideas". Showbiz Cheat Sheet. Archived from the original on August 14, 2020.
- Villeneuve, Nicole (April 8, 2009). "Scott Pilgrim vs. the World (Just Not Toronto)". Torontoist. Gothamist. Archived from the original on August 15, 2011.
- Wigler, Josh (November 12, 2010). "Alternate 'Scott Pilgrim' Ending Featured Giant Gideon Robot, Says Edgar Wright". MTV News. Archived from the original on November 7, 2018.
- Zhong, Fan (August 9, 2013). "Brie Larson: Scene Stealer". W Magazine. Archived from the original on November 16, 2019.

=== Interviews ===
- Art of the Title (January 3, 2011). "Scott Pilgrim vs the World" (Interview with Edgar Wright, Oscar Wright & Richard Kenworthy). Archived from the original on November 16, 2011.
- Dan (August 16, 2010). "Geekadelphia: An EPIC Conversation with Edgar Wright & Michael Cera of Scott Pilgrim Vs. The World". Archived from the original on August 19, 2010.
- Down, Lauren (August 20, 2010). "TLOBF Interview // Bryan Lee O'Malley". The Line of Best Fit. Archived from the original on March 7, 2020.
- Empire (2010a). "Edgar Wright Talks Scott Pilgrim Trailer". Archived from the original on February 9, 2015.
- Goldberg, Matt (May 25, 2010a). "Edgar Wright, Michael Cera, Jason Schwartzman Interview Scott Pilgrim vs. the World". Collider. Archived from the original on July 25, 2010.
- Huddleston, Tom. "50 essential comic-book movies, with Edgar Wright: part 3". Time Out. Archived from the original on January 23, 2013.
- Leader, Michael (August 23, 2010). "Scott Pilgrim press conference: stunts, comic books, Ant-Man and more". Den of Geek. Archived from the original on March 7, 2020.
- Lussier, Germain (August 7, 2010a). "Mary Elizabeth Winstead and Ellen Wong Interview Scott Pilgrim VS. THE WORLD; Plus Info on THE THING Prequel, DIE HARD 5, and the Alternate Ending". Collider.com. Archived from the original on August 16, 2010.
- Miller, Nancy (June 22, 2010). "Director Edgar Wright, Actor Michael Cera Crack Wise About Scott Pilgrim". Wired. Vol. 18, no. 7. Archived from the original on June 26, 2010.
- Warner, Andrea (July 21, 2010). "Bryan Lee O'Malley, Edgar Wright and Kevin Drew Talk the Music of Scott Pilgrim". Exclaim!. Archived from the original on July 23, 2010.
- Wigler, Josh (October 13, 2009). "Aubrey Plaza Says 'Scott Pilgrim' Casting Was 'Meant To Be'". MTV News. Archived from the original on May 6, 2019.
- Winning, Josh (June 2, 2010a). "Q&A: Scott Pilgrim creator Bryan Lee O'Malley". Total Film. Archived from the original on May 19, 2011.
- Winning, Josh (June 2, 2010b). "Q&A: Scott Pilgrim creator Bryan Lee O'Malley". Total Film. Archived from the original on May 17, 2019.

=== Literature ===
- Berninger, Mark (2013). ""Scott Pilgrim Gets It Together": The Cultural Crossovers of Bryan Lee O'Malley". In Denson, Shane; Christina, Meyer; Stein, Daniel (eds.). Transnational Perspectives on Graphic Narratives: Comics at the Crossroads. A&C Black. pp. 250–251. ISBN 9781441185754.
- Bodner, John (2019). "Scott Pilgrim's Precious Little Texts: Adaptation, Form, and Transmedia Co-creation". Comics and Pop Culture: Adaptation from Panel to Frame. University of Texas Press. pp. 246–264. ISBN 9781477319390.
- Burke, Liam (2015). The Comic Book Film Adaptation: Exploring Modern Hollywood's Leading Genre. Jackson: University of Mississippi Press. ISBN 978-1-62674-515-5. OCLC 896806934.
- Diaz Pino, Camilo (2015). "Sound affects: Visualizing music, musicians and (sub)cultural identity in BECK and Scott Pilgrim". Studies in Comics. 6 (1): 85–108(24). doi:10.1386/stic.6.1.85_1.
- Fehrle, Johannes (2015). "Leading into the Franchise. Remediation as (Simulated) Transmedia World. The Case of Scott Pilgrim" (PDF). IMAGE. 21 (2): 4–16. S2CID 59582097. Archived from the original (PDF) on February 8, 2020.
- Gandolfi, Enrico; Semprebene, Rodolfo (2015). "Play the game in the opening scene A multidisciplinary lens for understanding (video)ludic movies, including Super Mario Bros., Resident Evil and Scott Pilgrim vs. the World". GAME the Italian Journal of Game Studies. Archived from the original on April 2, 2019.
- Grant, Barry Keith; Henderson, Scott (2019). Comics and Pop Culture: Adaptation from Panel to Frame. University of Texas Press. pp. 13–14. ISBN 9781477319390.
- O'Hara, Helen (2020). "Scott Pilgrim vs. the World". The Ultimate Superhero Movie Guide: The definitive handbook for comic book film fans. London: Carlton Books. pp. 72–75. ISBN 978-1-78739-260-1. OCLC 1145068903.
- Ortiz, Maria J. (2014). "Visual Manifestations of Primary Metaphors Through Mise-en-scène Techniques". Image & Narrative. 15 (1): 5–16. ISSN 1780-678X. Archived from the original on April 11, 2018.
- Ryan, Marie-Laure; Thon, Jan-Noël (2014). "Storyworlds across Media: Introduction". Storyworlds across Media. Lincoln: University of Nebraska Press. pp. 1–21. Archived from the original on February 12, 2020.
- Wallace, Dave (2013). "Scott Pilgrim". In Duncan, Randy; Smith, Matthew J. (eds.). Icons of the American comic book: from Captain America to Wonder Woman. Vol. 1. Santa Barbara, Calif.: Greenwood. pp. 652–659. ISBN 978-0-313-39924-4. OCLC 829387631.
- Weiss, Allan (November 26, 2014). The Canadian Fantastic in Focus: New Perspectives. McFarland. ISBN 9781476617909.
- Zeitlin Wu, Lida (2016). "Transmedia Adaptation, or the Kinesthetics of Scott Pilgrim Vs. The World". Adaptation. 9 (3): 417–427. doi:10.1093/adaptation/apw033.

=== News ===
- Alexander, Susannah (May 21, 2020). "Scott Pilgrim vs The World to be re-released in cinemas". Digital Spy. Archived from the original on May 21, 2020.
- Anderson, Jenna (May 20, 2020). "Scott Pilgrim vs. the World to Be Re-Released in Theaters". Comic Book.com. Archived from the original on May 21, 2020.
- Chatalbash, Tom (May 21, 2020). "Scott Pilgrim Vs. The World Returning To Theaters For 10th Anniversary". ScreenRant. Archived from the original on May 21, 2020.
- Corliss, Richard (August 15, 2010). "Box Office: Sly Preys on Julia, World Beats Pilgrim". Time. Archived from the original on August 17, 2010.
- Dinning, Mark (2009). "Movie-Con III Is Coming! Scott Pilgrim Screening Announced!". Empire. Archived from the original on December 15, 2011.
- Fernandez, Sofia M. (January 5, 2011). "'Inception,' 'Scott Pilgrim' on Oscar Visual Effects Shortlist". The Hollywood Reporter. Archived from the original on September 20, 2014.
- Fritz, Ben (August 15, 2010). "Box office: 'Expendables' blows up, 'Scott Pilgrim' out of tune, 'Eat Pray Love' has decent first bite". Los Angeles Times. Archived from the original on August 18, 2010. "Universal spent about $85 million to make the picture, along with a small investment by Relativity Media"
- Gifford, Kevin (August 24, 2011). "Check Out the Retro Game Master Guy's Commentary Track on Scott Pilgrim vs. The World". 1UP.com. Archived from the original on January 24, 2016.
- Goldberg, Matt (June 21, 2010b). "Scott Pilgrim vs the World Soundtrack Track Listing revealed". Collider. Archived from the original on January 9, 2020.
- Goldstein, Hilary; Hatfield, Daemon; Miller, Greg (July 19, 2010). "SDCC 10: Scott Pilgrim vs. The World – Clash at Demonhead. The world doesn't stand a chance". IGN. News Corporation. Archived from the original on July 27, 2010.
- Hughes, William (May 21, 2020). "Edgar Wright's bringing the Scott Pilgrim movie back to theaters". The AV Club. Archived from the original on May 21, 2020.
- Kumar, Mathew (February 3, 2009). "Scott Pilgrim's Precious Little Extras". Torontoist. Archived from the original on April 3, 2015.
- Lang, Derrik J. (July 23, 2010). "'Scott Pilgrim' creates Comic-Con pandemonium". The Washington Times. Archived from the original on August 5, 2010.
- Joyce, Lee (July 23, 2010). "Scott Pilgrim vs. the World" Director Treats Comic-Con Attendees to Free Screening of Film". CBS News. Archived from the original on August 24, 2010.
- Marshall, Rick (June 9, 2010). "First 'Scott Pilgrim Vs. The World' Clip Featuring Chris Evans as Lucas Lee". MTV.com. Archived from the original on June 14, 2010.
- Minsker, Evan (December 11, 2020). "Kid Cudi Releases New Album Man on the Moon III: Listen and Read the Full Credits". Pitchfork.
- Newby, Richard (May 21, 2020). "Edgar Wright Explains Alternate Ending to 'Scott Pilgrim vs. the World'". The Hollywood Reporter. Archived from the original on May 21, 2020.
- Parsons, Ryan (January 20, 2009). "Chris Evans, Brandon Routh and Brie Larson Join Scott Pilgrim". CanMag. Archived from the original on March 23, 2010.
- Raup, Jordan (August 5, 2010). "'Scott Pilgrim Vs. The World' Interactive Trailer". The Film Stage. Archived from the original on March 1, 2020.
- Time Out (May 18, 2020). "Watch With the Academy: 'Scott Pilgrim vs. the World' | Online". Time Out Los Angeles. Archived from the original on May 21, 2020.
- Trumbore, Dave (May 21, 2020). "Edgar Wright Reveals Incredible Cast Photos & Trivia During 'Scott Pilgrim' Watch-Party". Collider.
- Ubisoft (July 28, 2009). "Ubisoft and Universal Pictures Partner on Scott Pilgrim VS. The World Video Game". Archived from the original on July 17, 2011.
- The Wall Street Journal (August 15, 2010). "'The Expendables' Tops Weekend Box Office". Archived from the original on August 17, 2010.
- Whaley, Karen (March 19, 2008a). "Michael Cera = Scott Pilgrim". Torontoist. Archived from the original on April 1, 2015.
- Whaley, Karen (May 17, 2008b). "Mary Elizabeth Winstead = Ramona Flowers". Torontoist. Archived from the original on March 30, 2015.
- Woodward, Todd (2010). "Scott Pilgrim vs. The World (US – DVD R1, BD RA)". DVDActive. Archived from the original on September 16, 2013.

=== Reviews ===
- Bergson, Phillip (June 1, 2011). "Sunny Lund's Fantastic Film Festival". www.filmfestivals.com. Archived from the original on August 29, 2014.
- Budowski, Jade (July 5, 2018). "'Scott Pilgrim vs. The World' Is Leaving HBO, So Fall In Lesbians With It All Over Again". Decider. Archived from the original on October 30, 2019.
- Debruge, Peter (July 23, 2010). "Scott Pilgrim vs. the World". Variety. Archived from the original on July 26, 2010.
- Edelstein, David (August 1, 2010). "A Not So Super Hero". New York. Archived from the original on August 5, 2010.
- The Film Stage (March 3, 2010). "Kevin Smith Talks Scott Pilgrim". Archived from the original on January 14, 2011.
- Hale, Meghan (April 8, 2020). "Scott Pilgrim vs the World Retro Review – A Solid, Innovative Adaptation". Comic Years. Archived from the original on April 11, 2020.
- Honeycutt, Kirk (July 23, 2010). "Scott Pilgrim vs. the World – Film Review". The Hollywood Reporter. Archived from the original on November 15, 2010.
- Hunt, James (August 25, 2010b). "Scott Pilgrim Vs The World review". Den of Geek. Archived from the original on March 6, 2020.
- Metacritic. "Scott Pilgrim vs. the World (2010): Reviews". CBS Interactive. Archived from the original on February 5, 2018.
- Metacritic (August 10, 2010). "Scott Pilgrim vs. the World Critic Reviews for PlayStation 3". CBS Interactive. Archived from the original on August 16, 2010.
- O'Hara, Helen (2010). "Scott Pilgrim Vs The World Review". Empire. Archived from the original on March 6, 2020.
- Phillips, Michael (August 11, 2010). "Funny first and everything else second". Chicago Tribune. Metromix. Archived from the original on August 26, 2010.
- Reynolds, Simon (August 13, 2010). "Michael Cera battles seven evil exes to win the girl of his dreams in Scott Pilgrim Vs. The World". Digital Spy. Archived from the original on June 10, 2019.
- Rotten Tomatoes (August 13, 2010). "Scott Pilgrim vs. the World (2010)". Fandango Media. Archived from the original on May 23, 2019.
- Schager, Nick (August 1, 2010). "Scott Pilgrim vs. the World". Slant Magazine. Archived from the original on August 4, 2010.
- Scott, A.O. (August 12, 2010). "This Girl Has a Lot of Baggage, and He Must Shoulder the Load". The New York Times. Archived from the original on August 15, 2010.
- Sheetz, Janelle (September 14, 2019). "Stellar Soundtracks: Scott Pilgrim vs. the World". Medium. Archived from the original on March 7, 2020.
- Travers, Peter (August 12, 2010). "Scott Pilgrim vs. The World". Rolling Stone. Archived from the original on March 6, 2020.
- Vore, Bryan (June 8, 2010). "Scott Pilgrim Game First Hands-On". Game Informer. Archived from the original on May 17, 2012.
- White, Cindy (August 12, 2010). "Scott Pilgrim Vs. the World Review. Edgar Wright's take on the videogame-inspired comic series is full of win". IGN. News Corporation. Archived from the original on August 19, 2010.

=== Web ===
- "Original Soundtrack Scott Pilgrim Vs. the World Credits". AllMusic. 2010. Archived from the original on February 12, 2020.
- BBFC (July 30, 2010). "SCOTT PILGRIM VS. THE WORLD (12A)". British Board of Film Classification. Archived from the original on April 30, 2018.
- Box Office Mojo. "Scott Pilgrim vs. the World at Box Office Mojo". Archived from the original on February 29, 2020.
- Box Office Mojo (2010). "Weekend Box Office Results for August 20–22, 2010". Archived from the original on November 20, 2010.
- CinemaScore (2010). "SCOTT PILGRIM VS. THE WORLD (2010) A-". Archived from the original on December 20, 2018.
- Empire (2010d). "Empire's 2010 Top 20". IMDb.
- Fantasia (2010). "Films & Schedules: Scott Pilgrim Vs. the World". Fantasia Festival. Archived from the original on July 10, 2011.
- Jeunesse, Marilyn La (2019). "11 things you probably didn't know about Brie Larson". Insider.
- Knowles, Harry (January 5, 2011). "Harry's Top Ten Films of 2010!!!". Aint It Cool News. Archived from the original on February 16, 2020.
- Lockyer, Margaret (July 24, 2020). "Scott Pilgrim Vs the World: 5 Actors You Probably FORGOT Were in the Film". CBR.
- Lund IFFF (2010). "Lund International Fantastic Film Festival 2010 – Magazine". Issuu.
- Music From Film. "Music from Scott Pilgrim vs. the World". Archived from the original on November 25, 2010.
- Nintendo (January 14, 2021). "Scott Pilgrim vs. The World™: The Game – Complete Edition". Nintendo of Europe.
- The Numbers. "Scott Pilgrim vs. The World – Box Office Data". Archived from the original on June 11, 2011.
- Odeon (2020). "Scott Pilgrim Vs. The World (10th Anniversary)". Archived from the original on August 18, 2020.
- The Official Charts (January 8, 2011). "Video Archive Chart". Archived from the original on June 15, 2011.
- O'Malley, Brian Lee (August 17, 2012). "photos-of-me-and-edgar-wright-london-august". Archived from the original on July 8, 2013.
- O'Malley, Bryan Lee (June 25, 2013a). "Brian Lee". Radiomaru.com. Archived from the original on July 7, 2013.
- O'Malley, Bryan Lee (May 8, 2013b). "I saw the io9 article about unused happy endings, and I had no idea they shot an alternate end for SP. I'm not sure which one I like better- they're both good- but I was wondering what you thought about the one that doesn't match the comics?". Radiomaru.com. Radiomaru (O'Malley's Tumblr). Archived from the original on March 30, 2019.
- SDCC (June 17, 2020). "A Look Back At San Diego Comic-Con 2010". San Diego Comic-Con Unofficial Blog.
- UK Film Council (2010). "UK Box Office 27–29 August 2010". Archived from the original on September 4, 2010.
- Universal Pictures. "Scott Pilgrim vs. the World". Archived from the original on April 2, 2019.
- Wright, Edgar (August 28, 2009b). "August 28th, 2009 21:40 (EDT) Wrap!". Edgar Wright Here. Archived from the original on February 23, 2012.
- Wright, Edgar (August 10, 2010a). "Scott Pilgrim Vs. The World – Original Score ~ Digital Release August 10, 2010". Edgar Wright Here. Archived from the original on August 20, 2010.
- Wright, Edgar [@edgarwright] (September 5, 2019). "Metric wanted their original version on the OST. Which is fair enough. So... for now at least, the Brie version is just on the film, DVD extras and YouTube..." Archived from the original on September 19, 2019 – via Twitter.
- Wright, Edgar (March 25, 2010b). "It's here ... The Official Scott Pilgrim Vs. The World Teaser Trailer". Edgar Wright Here. Archived from the original on May 31, 2010.
- Wright, Edgar (2010c). "The New Scott Pilgrim Vs. The World Trailer!". Edgar Wright Here. Archived from the original on April 5, 2012.
- Wright, Edgar (March 1, 2011). "Scott Pilgrim Vs. The World – Notable Japanese Personalities Tributes to the film". Edgar Wright Here. Archived from the original on March 8, 2011.
- Yubari IFFF (2011). "Yubari International Fantastic Film Festival 2011". Yubari International Fantastic Film Festival. Archived from the original on March 24, 2011.
