= McEnroe (surname) =

McEnroe is an Irish surname. Notable people with the surname include:

- Colin McEnroe (born 1954), American columnist and radio personality
- John McEnroe (born 1959), American former professional tennis player
- Patrick McEnroe (born 1966), American broadcaster and former professional tennis player
- Robert E. McEnroe (1916–1998), American playwright
