= David Edelstein =

American film critic (born 1959)

- Born: 1959 (age 66–67)
- Education: Harvard University
- Occupation: Film critic

David Edelstein (born 1959) is a freelance American film critic who has been the principal film critic for Slate and New York magazine, among others, and has appeared regularly on NPR's Fresh Air and CBS Sunday Morning programs. Over a long career, Edelstein has published more than 2000 film reviews. In 2021, Colin McEnroe called Edelstein "America's greatest living film critic".

== Career ==
Edelstein became a journalist after graduating from Harvard University in 1981. He is often associated with close friend, fellow film critic, and iconoclast Pauline Kael. He is also credited with coining the term "torture porn," a genre to describe such movies as Hostel and Saw.

He has previously been a film critic for Slate (1996–2005), NPR's Fresh Air (2002–2018), New York (2006–2020), the New York Post, The Village Voice, and The Boston Phoenix. His work has also appeared in The New York Times' Arts & Leisure section, Rolling Stone, Vanity Fair, The New York Times Magazine, Variety, and Esquire, among others. He has been a member of the New York Film Critics Circle and the National Society of Film Critics. Edelstein appeared six times as a guest on the television program Charlie Rose to talk about the movies and the Oscar telecast.

=== Dismissal from Fresh Air ===
On November 26, 2018, Edelstein provoked controversy when he made a joke about the rape scene in Last Tango in Paris on his Facebook page. The joke, which was part of his post noting the passing of the film's director Bernardo Bertolucci, was widely criticized. Edelstein promptly apologized and deleted the original post. He said he had not been aware of actress Maria Schneider's 2007 statement that the rape scene was unscripted and caused her to feel "a little raped" by her co-star Marlon Brando and Bertolucci.

The following day, Fresh Air characterized the post as "offensive and unacceptable", and announced that Edelstein had been dismissed as a contributor. The statement reads, "The post does not meet the standards that we expect from Fresh Air contributors...We have decided to end Fresh Air’s association with him, and have informed David accordingly.” His firing was criticized by several media outlets, including Salon, the editorial board of the New York Post, and The American Conservative.

== Bibliography ==
He is the co-author with independent film producer Christine Vachon of the book Shooting to Kill (1998). He is also the author of two plays, Feed the Monkey (Loeb Experimental Theater, Harvard College, 1993) and Blaming Mom (Watermark Theater, New York City, 1994).
