= Donnybrook! =

- Original Broadway Cast Recording
- Music: Johnny Burke
- Lyrics: Johnny Burke
- Book: Robert E. McEnroe
- Basis: 1952 film The Quiet Man
- Productions: 1961 Broadway

Donnybrook! is a musical, with music and lyrics by Johnny Burke and book by Robert E. McEnroe. It is based on the 1952 film The Quiet Man.

== Production ==
Donnybrook! opened on Broadway at the 46th Street Theatre on May 18, 1961 and closed on July 15, 1961 after 68 performances and 2 previews. The director and choreographer was Jack Cole, with sets and costumes by Rouben Ter-Arutunian. The cast featured Art Lund (as John Enright), Joan Fagan (as Ellen Roe Danaher), Eddie Foy Jr., Susan Johnson (as Kathy Carey) and Philip Bosco (Will Danaher). The original actress for the role of Ellen, Kipp Hamilton, left prior to opening due to a "respiratory ailment." Fagan was the stand-by for the role.

== Overview ==
John Enright, an Irish-American prizefighter, who has killed a man in the ring and vowed never to raise a hand again to anyone, returns to Ireland from America. He meets and woos a tempestuous Irish village maiden, Ellen Roe, who wants a man who will stand up and fight for her. However, Ellen's brother Will believes John to be a coward and gets in the way of the romance.

The score included the ballads, "He Makes Me Feel I'm Lovely" and "I Have My Own Way", for Fagan and Lund, respectively, as well as "I Wouldn't Bet One Penny" and "Dee-lightful Is the Word" for the secondary couple, as well as a lively title song and the assertive "Sez I," which framed the show at the top of the first act and the end of the second.

== Song list ==
Act 1

- Sez I
- The Day The Snow Is Meltin'
- Sad Was The Day
- Donnybrook
- The Day the Snow is Meltin' (Reprise)
- Ellen Roe
- The Loveable Irish
- I Wouldn't Bet One Penny
- He Makes Me Feel I'm Lovely
- I Have My Own Way
- A Toast To The Bride

Act 2

- Wisha Wurra
- He Makes Me Feel I'm Lovely (Reprise)
- A Quiet Life
- Mr. Flynn
- Dee-Lightful Is The Word
- For My Own
