= List of accolades received by Scott Pilgrim vs. the World =

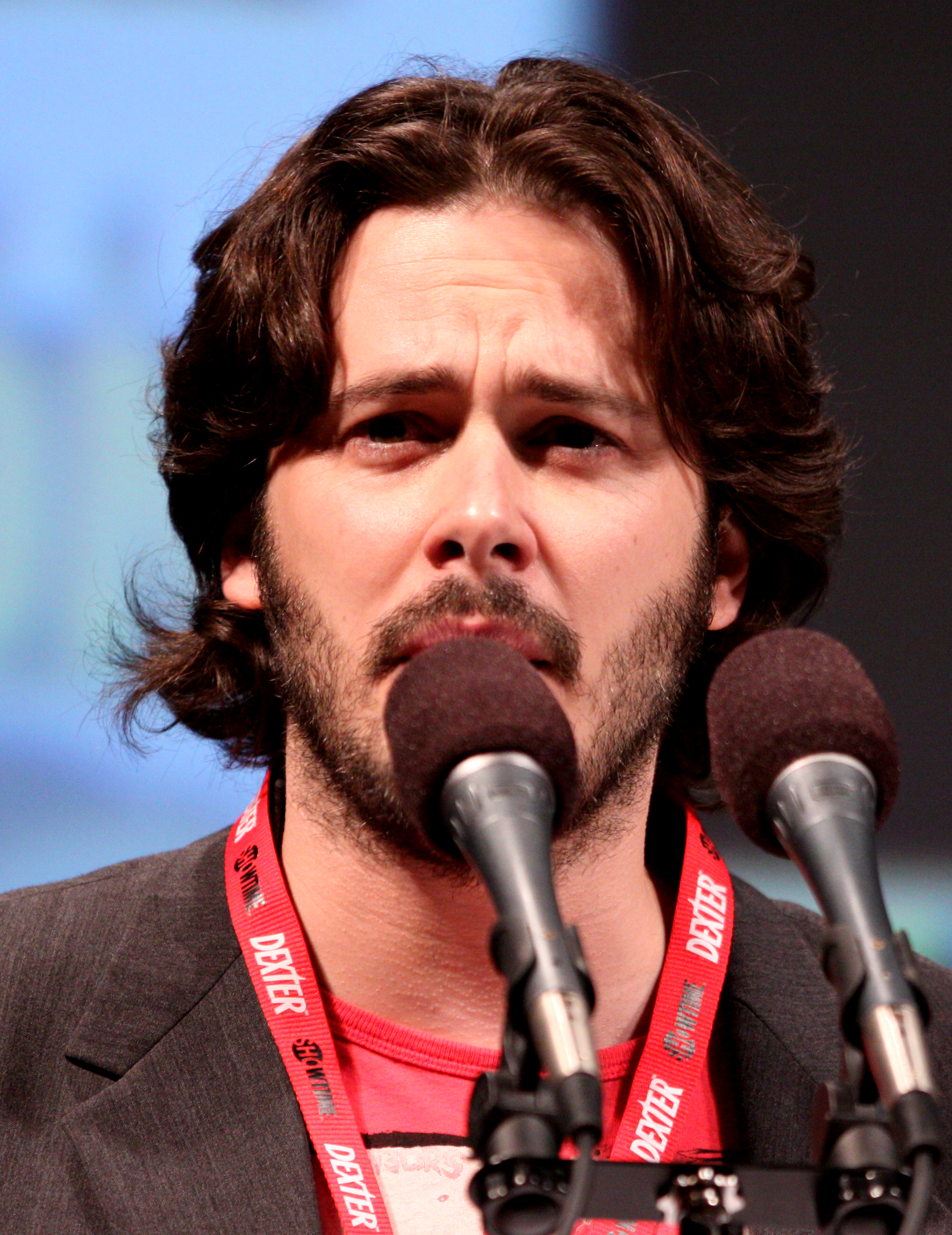
- Edgar Wright in 2010
Accolades
Award	Wins	Nominations

Totals (Note: Certain award groups do not simply award one winner. They acknowledge several different recipients, have runners-up, and have third place. Since this is a specific recognition and is different from losing an award, runner-up mentions are considered wins in this award tally. For simplification and to avoid errors, each award in this list has been presumed to have had a prior nomination.)
- Wins: 19
- Nominations: 59

Scott Pilgrim vs. the World is a 2010 film, co-written and directed by Edgar Wright. It has received many awards and nominations. It also made the final shortlist of seven films for nomination in the Best Visual Effects category at the 83rd Academy Awards, but did not receive a nomination.

== Best-of lists ==
- No. 1 – Ain't It Cool News (Harry Knowles)
- No. 3 – HitFix
- No. 3 – The Film Stage
- No. 6 – Collider
- No. 6 (on Top Twenty Films of 2010) – Empire Online
- In the top 10 – Austin Film Critics Association
- No. 10 – Las Vegas Film Critic Society
- No. 13 (on Top Fifteen Films of 2010) – The A.V. Club (Note: Individual reporters for The A.V. Club: Nathan Rabin No. 10, Tasha Robinson No. 3)
- One of the Best Popcorn Movies of 2010 – Seattle Times

It was also listed on Empire's Best Movie Scenes of 2010 list, and ranked number 47 on Empire's Top 100 Films of the 21st century in 2020.

== 2010 ==
Year	Award	Category	Nominee	Result	Ref(s)
2010	Austin Film Critics Association Awards	Best Film	Scott Pilgrim vs. the World	Nominated	
2010	Awards Circuit Community Awards	Honorable Mentions	Scott Pilgrim vs. the World	Won	
2010	Awards Circuit Community Awards	Best Achievement in Visual Effects	Scott Pilgrim vs. the World	2nd	
2010	Awards Circuit Community Awards	Best Adapted Screenplay	Michael Bacall and Edgar Wright	Nominated	
2010	Golden Schmoes Award	Best Music in a Movie	Scott Pilgrim vs. the World	Won	
2010	Golden Schmoes Award	Most Underrated Movie of the Year	Scott Pilgrim vs. the World	Won	
2010	Golden Schmoes Award	Best Comedy of the Year	Scott Pilgrim vs. the World	Won	
2010	Golden Schmoes Award	Biggest Surprise of the Year	Scott Pilgrim vs. the World	Won	
2010	Golden Schmoes Award	Favourite Movie of the Year	Scott Pilgrim vs. the World	Nominated	
2010	Golden Schmoes Award	Best Director of the Year	Edgar Wright	Nominated	
2010	Golden Schmoes Award	Trippiest Movie of the Year	Scott Pilgrim vs. the World	Nominated	
2010	Golden Schmoes Award	Best Special Effects of the Year	Scott Pilgrim vs. the World	Nominated	
2010	Golden Schmoes Award	Best DVD / Blu-Ray of the Year	Scott Pilgrim vs. the World	Nominated	
2010	Golden Schmoes Award	Best T&A of the Year	Mary Elizabeth Winstead	Nominated	
2010	Golden Schmoes Award	Favourite Movie Poster of the Year	Scott Pilgrim vs. the World	Nominated	
2010	Houston Film Critics Society Awards	Best Original Song	"We Are Sex Bob-Omb" by Beck	Won	
2010	IGN Summer Movie Awards	Best Comic Book Adaptation	Scott Pilgrim vs. the World	Nominated	
2010	Indiana Film Journalists Association	Best Picture	Scott Pilgrim vs. the World	Nominated	
2010	Las Vegas Film Critics Society Sierra Awards	Best Costume Design	Laura Jean Shannon	Nominated	
2010	Las Vegas Film Critics Society Sierra Awards	Best Art Direction	Scott Pilgrim vs. the World	Nominated	
2010	Las Vegas Film Critics Society Sierra Awards	Best Visual Effects	Scott Pilgrim vs. the World	Nominated	
2010	Las Vegas Film Critics Society Sierra Awards	Best Song	Beck "We Are Sex Bob-Omb!"	Nominated	
2010	New York Film Critics Online	Top Films of the Year	Scott Pilgrim vs. the World	Won	
2010	San Diego Film Critics Society Awards	Best Editing	Jonathan Amos and Paul Machliss	Won	
2010	San Diego Film Critics Society Awards	Best Adapted Screenplay	Michael Bacall and Edgar Wright	Nominated	
2010	Satellite Awards	Best Film – Musical or Comedy	Scott Pilgrim vs. the World	Won	
2010	Satellite Awards	Best Actor – Motion Picture Musical or Comedy	Michael Cera	Won	
2010	Satellite Awards	Best Art Direction and Production Design	Nigel Churcher and Marcus Rowland	Nominated	
2010	Satellite Awards	Best Adapted Screenplay	Michael Bacall and Edgar Wright	Nominated	
2010	St. Louis Film Critics Association	Best Film – Comedy	Scott Pilgrim vs. the World	Won	
2010	St. Louis Film Critics Association	Best Adapted Screenplay	Michael Bacall and Edgar Wright	Nominated	
2010	St. Louis Film Critics Association	Best Visual Effects	Scott Pilgrim vs. the World	Nominated	
2010	St. Louis Film Critics Association	Moving the Medium Forward (for Technical / Artistic Innovation that Advances the Medium)	Scott Pilgrim vs. the World	Nominated	
2010	St. Louis Film Critics Association	Best Creative / Artistic Film (for Excellence in Art-House Cinema)	Scott Pilgrim vs. the World	Nominated	
2010	Utah Film Critics Association Awards	Best Director	Edgar Wright	Nominated	
2010	Utah Film Critics Association Awards	Best Screenplay	Michael Bacall and Edgar Wright	Nominated	
2010	Detroit Film Critics Society Awards	Best Director	Edgar Wright	Nominated	
2010	Detroit Film Critics Society Awards	Best Ensemble	Michael Cera, Mary Elizabeth Winstead, Kieran Culkin, Chris Evans, Anna Kendrick, Brie Larson, Alison Pill, Aubrey Plaza, Brandon Routh, Jason Schwartzman, Johnny Simmons, Mark Webber, Mae Whitman, Ellen Wong, Satya Bhabha, Shota Saito, Keita Saito and Nelson Franklin	Nominated	

== 2011 ==
Year	Award	Category	Nominee	Result	Ref(s)
2011	Academy of Science Fiction, Fantasy & Horror Films	Best Fantasy Film	Scott Pilgrim vs. the World	Nominated	
2011	American Cinema Editors	American Cinema Editors Award for Best Edited Feature Film – Comedy or Musical	Jonathan Amos and Paul Machliss	Nominated	
2011	Casting Society of America, Artios Awards	Outstanding Achievement in Casting – Big Budget Feature – Comedy	Robin D. Cook and Jennifer Euston	Nominated	
2011	Central Ohio Film Critics Association	Best Picture	Scott Pilgrim vs. the World	Nominated	
2011	Central Ohio Film Critics Association	Best Overlooked Film	Scott Pilgrim vs. the World	2nd	
2011	The Comedy Awards	Best Film Director	Edgar Wright	Won	
2011	Dorian Awards	Unsung Film of the Year	Scott Pilgrim vs. the World	Nominated	
2011	Empire Awards	Best Film	Scott Pilgrim vs. the World	Nominated	
2011	Empire Awards	Best Sci-Fi/Fantasy Film	Scott Pilgrim vs. the World	Nominated	
2011	Empire Awards	Best Director	Edgar Wright	Won	
2011	GLAAD Media Awards	Outstanding Film – Wide Release	Scott Pilgrim vs. the World	Nominated	
2011	Hugo Awards	Best Dramatic Presentation – Long Form	Michael Bacall and Edgar Wright	Nominated	
2011	International Cinephile Society Awards	Best Editing	Jonathan Amos and Paul Machliss	Nominated	
2011	Italian Online Movie Awards	Best Original Score	Nigel Godrich	Nominated	
2011	Italian Online Movie Awards	Best Special Effects	Scott Pilgrim vs. the World	Nominated	
2011	Online Film & Television Association	Best Title Sequence	Scott Pilgrim vs. the World	Won	
2011	Online Film & Television Association	Best Music / Original Song	Beck for "We Are Sex Bob-Omb"	Nominated	
2011	Online Film & Television Association	Best Film Editing	Jonathan Amos and Paul Machliss	Nominated	
2011	Online Film & Television Association	Best Costume Design	Laura Jean Shannon	Nominated	
2011	Online Film & Television Association	Best Sound Mixing	James Boyle, Chris Burdon and Doug Cooper	Nominated	
2011	Online Film & Television Association	Best Sound Effects Editing	Jeremy Price and Julian Slater	Nominated	
2011	Online Film & Television Association	Best Visual Effects	Dennis Berardi, Frazer Churchill and Arthur Langevin	Nominated	
2011	Online Film Critics Society Awards	Best Editing	Jonathan Amos and Paul Machliss	Nominated	
2011	Online Film Critics Society Awards	Best Adapted Screenplay	Michael Bacall and Edgar Wright	Nominated	
2011	Saturn Awards	Best Fantasy Film	Scott Pilgrim vs. the World	Nominated	
2011	Science Fiction and Fantasy Writers of America	Ray Bradbury Award	Michael Bacall and Edgar Wright	Nominated	
2011	SFX Awards	Best Film Director	Edgar Wright	Won	
2011	Scream Awards	The Ultimate Scream	Scott Pilgrim vs. the World	Nominated	
2011	Scream Awards	Best Director	Edgar Wright	Nominated	
2011	Scream Awards	Best Scream-Play	Scott Pilgrim vs. the World	Nominated	
2011	Scream Awards	Best Villain	Satya Bhabha, Chris Evans, Brandon Routh, Mae Whitman, Shota Saito, Keita Saito and Jason Schwartzman as The League of Evil Exes	Nominated	
2011	Scream Awards	Best Supporting Actress	Ellen Wong	Nominated	
2011	Scream Awards	Best Supporting Actor	Kieran Culkin	Nominated	
2011	Scream Awards	Fight Scene of the Year	Final Battle: Scott Pilgrim and Knives vs. Gideon Graves	Won	
2011	Scream Awards	Best Comic Book Movie	Scott Pilgrim vs. the World	Won	
2011	Teen Choice Awards	Choice Movie: Action Actor	Michael Cera	Nominated	
2011	Teen Choice Awards	Choice Movie: Action Actress	Mary Elizabeth Winstead	Nominated	
2011	Teen Choice Awards	Choice Movie: Action	Scott Pilgrim vs. the World	Nominated	
2011	Webby Award	Website – Movie & Film	Scottpilgrimthemovie.com	Won	

== 2012 ==
Year	Award	Category	Nominee	Result	Ref(s)
2012	American Library Association	Fabulous Film for Young Adults	Scott Pilgrim vs. the World	Won	
