= Michael Lazarovitch =

Canadian actor

Michael Lazarovitch is an American and Canadian actor and producer. He is probably most well known for his stage work across Canada and the US, as well as his role as Young Eddie in the Original Broadway Studio Cast Recording of the musical Come Summer.

In film and television, he's had supporting and guest star roles on numerous projects, including The Recruit (Netflix), Christmas with a Crown (A&E/Lifetime), Liberty Crossing (go90/Apple), Cupcake Grand Prix (Superchannel/UPTv), Totally Spies (ABC Family), and Edgar Wright's Scott Pilgrim vs. the World, opposite fellow Canadian Michael Cera (Universal Pictures) and David Furnish/Elton John feature film It's a Boy Girl Thing (Icon/Rocket Pictures). Other credits include Queer as Folk (Showtime) and From Italy with Amore (ReelOne).

As a producer, he is a Partner and VP at Chemically Altered Productions, founded by 3 time Emmy nominated producer Zachary Halley (Drunk History, The G-Word, Southside, Weird: The Al Yankovic Story starring Daniel Radcliffe) and Emmy winner Steven Tylor O'Connor (13 Reasons Why, The OA, The Healing Powers of Dude, Andi Mack). Most recently, in partnership with CAP, Lazarovitch continues to lead development on numerous scripted projects with partners including an hour long drama with CAA and showrunner Bill Rotko (The Good Doctor), an hour long genre series with showrunner Steven DeKnight (Anonymous Content) and numerous projects with Ileen Maisel and Amber Entertainment (20th Television). Other partners include Untitled Entertainment, Clement Virgo's Conquering Lion Pictures, Emmy nominated and Golden Globe winning Executive Producer Eileen Conn, veteran showrunner Thania St. John and newly minted Nicholl's Fellow Haley Bartel. Lazarovitch set up the studio romantic comedy feature film Back Together with Spyglass Media Group (Scream/Paramount) from writer Erin Cardillo (Virgin River/Netflix; Isn't It Romantic/Universal / New Line).

Lazarovitch completed his BFA (Hons) undergrad work at Ryerson University and NYU Tisch School of the Arts (CAP21). He is a voting member of both the Academy of Television Arts & Sciences and the Academy of Canadian Cinema and Television. He lives and works in both Toronto and Los Angeles.
