= Robert E. McEnroe =

American playwright

Robert E. McEnroe (July 1, 1916 - February 6, 1998) was an American playwright.

== Biography ==
McEnroe was born in Connecticut. His father was a real estate agent who shared his son's passion for writing. He was raised in Miami Beach and attended the University of Miami. In 1947, while working in the research department at United Aircraft in Hartford, he sold two of a dozen plays he had written. Both were sold on the same day, each to separate Broadway producers. He later became a real estate agent.

He was married to Barbara C. McEnroe is the father of radio personality and columnist Colin McEnroe.

== Death ==
He died on February 6, 1998, at the Hughes Convalescent Home in West Hartford, Connecticut after a long illness.

== Works ==
- Donnybrook!
- The Silver Whistle
