= Colin McEnroe =

American columnist and radio personality (born 1954)

Colin McEnroe (born 1954) is an American columnist and radio personality. He hosts The Colin McEnroe Show on Connecticut Public Radio, writes a weekly column that runs in eight Hearst Communications, and writes a newsletter also for Hearst.

== Biography ==
=== Early life and education ===
McEnroe was born in Hartford, Connecticut. He graduated from Kingswood-Oxford School in West Hartford, Connecticut and earned a scholarship to Yale University. While a student at Yale College in 1974, he was a test subject in a controlled study on the addictive nature of computer games, which at that time were text-based. His father, Robert E. McEnroe was a playwright who had two shows produced on Broadway.

=== Career ===
McEnroe started writing newspaper columns in the 1980s and was syndicated for a while. It was also in the 1980s that he started writing for magazines.

In 1999, McEnroe wrote an often-cited essay for McSweeney's in which he claimed to be book critic Michiko Kakutani. The essay, "I Am Michiko Kakutani", is now included in an anthology of McSweeney's literary essays.

McEnroe has been a contributing editor at Best Life and Men's Health magazines and has been a frequent contributor to Mirabella, Mademoiselle and Verge. His writing has also appeared in Forbes FYI, Cosmopolitan, McSweeney's, Family Fun and Metropolitan Home. McEnroe is a weekly columnist for The Hartford Courant; he has been a reporter and columnist for The Courant for over 30 years. In addition, his columns have appeared in newspapers in America and abroad; he occasionally contributes to The New York Times op-ed page.

In 1994, McEnroe wrote a serialized novel in the pages of The Hartford Courant.

In May 2003, his play A Woman of a Certain Age, was produced at the Ivoryton Playhouse in Connecticut. The musical was done in collaboration with former Courant colleagues, Steve Metcalf and Lary Bloom.

In 2004, McEnroe's third book, My Father's Footprints, won the Connecticut Book Award for best biography or memoir.

In 2006, McEnroe was heavily involved in coverage of the Senate race between Joe Lieberman and Ned Lamont, especially after an exchange between Lieberman and McEnroe on the air. McEnroe also covered the race for Salon.

In Fall 2008, he resumed teaching duties at Trinity College in Hartford. His blog, [To Wit], appeared on the Courant's website through 2018 and offered a daily glimpse of his interests and opinions. In 2018, McEnroe moved the teaching part of his career to the Yale political science department.

In January 2019, McEnroe began writing a weekly column for Hearst's Connecticut newspapers, including the Connecticut Post, the New Haven Register and the Stamford Advocate.

McEnroe hosted a talk show on WTIC that was cancelled in December 2008. McEnroe then secured a post with a weekly afternoon show on WNPR in 2009.

McEnroe has moderated the Connecticut Forum for a record-setting ten times, including a panel featuring Anthony Bourdain, Alice Waters and Duff Goldman. In 2013, under the auspices of the Mark Twain House, he interviewed Stephen King.

In the 2008–2009 season, McEnroe and Edward Cumming reformatted the Hartford Symphony Orchestra's Connections series. He has performed his own spoken word pieces twice with the orchestra under Carolyn Kuan. In 2017, McEnroe teamed up with Kuan and director Eric Ort to create a series of monologues juxtaposed with the movements of Liszt's "Faust." The production featured actors Crystal Dickinson and Ward Duffy.

In 2016, the Colin McEnroe Show won First Place in the Interview category of the Public Radio News Directors awards, for his hour-long conversation with Hal Holbrook. Also in 2016, Ira Glass, speaking to a national conference of public radio program directors, cited the Colin McEnroe Show as his example of a local program using humor and innovation effectively. A subsequent conversation between the two men became an episode of The Pub, a national podcast about public radio. In February 2011, McEnroe and his radio staff were featured on the cover of Hartford Magazine.

In 2011, he became a contributor to Bicycling magazine, where he wrote a column about taking up the sport.

=== Marriage and children ===
McEnroe is divorced and has one son.

== Published works ==
- Swimming Chickens: And Other Half-breasted Accounts of the Animal World (Doubleday, 1987)
- Lose Weight Through Great Sex with Celebrities (The Elvis Way) (Doubleday, 1989)
- My Father's Footprints: a Memoir (Warner Books, 2003)
