= Joyner Lucas discography =

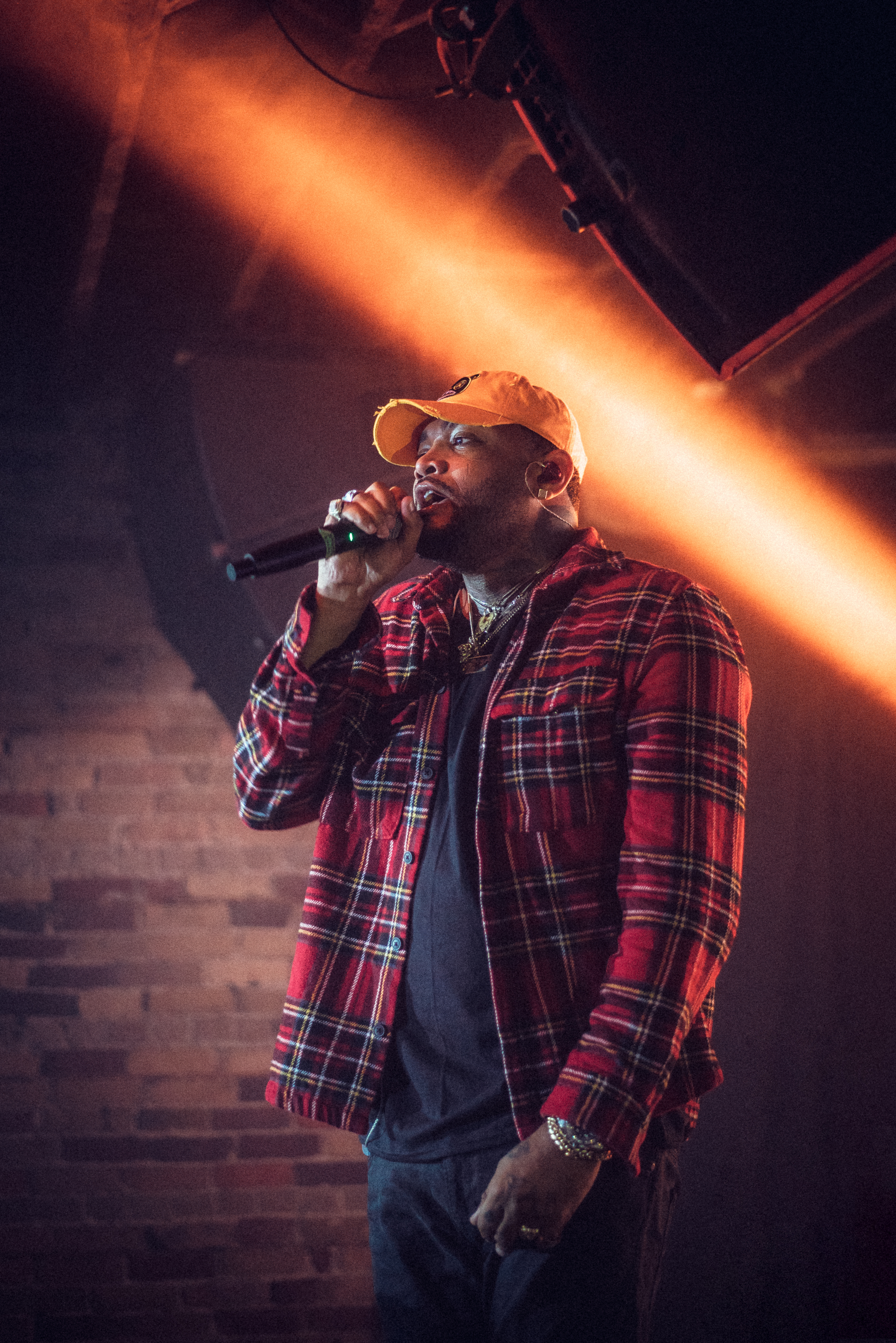
- Lucas in 2018
- Studio albums: 3
- EPs: 1
- Singles: 51
- Music videos: 53
- Mixtapes: 4

American rapper Joyner Lucas has released three studio albums, one EP, four mixtapes, and 50 singles (including 10 as a featured artist).

== Albums ==
=== Studio albums ===
Title	Album details	Peak chart positions										Certifications
Title	Album details	US	AUS	BEL (FL)	CAN	NLD	GER	IRE	NZ	NOR	UK	Certifications
ADHD	Released: March 27, 2020; Label: Twenty Nine Music Group; Format: CD, LP, digital download	10	9	25	9	43	65	12	10	33	16	RIAA: Gold; RMNZ: Gold
Not Now, I'm Busy	Released: March 22, 2024; Label: Twenty Nine Music Group; Format: CD, LP, digital download	42	—	—	70	—	—	—	—	—	—	
ADHD 2	Released: July 18, 2025; Label: Twenty Nine Music Group; Format: CD, LP, digital download	31	100	—	66	—	—	—	33	—	—	

== Extended plays ==
List of EPs, with selected chart positions
Title	Album details	Peak chart positions		
Title	Album details	US	AUS	CAN
Evolution	Released: October 23, 2020; Label: Twenty Nine Music Group; Format: CD, LP, digital download, streaming	49	45	37

== Mixtapes ==
List of mixtapes, with selected chart positions
Title	Album details	Peak chart positions
Title	Album details	US Heat
Listen to Me (as Future Joyner)	Released: May 13, 2011; Label: Dead Silence; Format: CD, digital download	—
Low Frequency Oscillators	Released: September 2, 2013; Label: Dead Silence; Format: CD, digital download	—
Along Came Joyner	Released: April 1, 2015; Label: Dead Silence; Format: CD, digital download	—
508-507-2209	Released: June 16, 2017; Label: Atlantic; Format: LP, digital download	7

=== Collaborative mixtapes ===
List of mixtapes
Title	Album details
Workprint: The Greatest Mixtape of All Time (with Film Skool Rejekts)	Released: 2007; Label: Self-released; Format: CD, digital download
Midnight Movie (with Film Skool Rejekts)	Released: December 5, 2008; Label: Self-released; Format: CD, digital download
Side Bettin Vol. 1 (with HeadCrack)	Released: January 7, 2010; Label: Self-released; Format: Digital download
Music For The B*tches (with Film Skool Rejekts)	Released: March 10, 2010; Label: Self-released; Format: Digital download
Mind Ya Business: the Greatest Mixtape of All-Time Pt. 2 (A Tribute to EPMD) (with Film Skool Rejekts)	Released: 2011; Label: Self-released; Format: Digital download

== Singles ==
=== As lead artist ===
List of singles as lead artist, showing year released, certification and album name
Title	Year	Peak chart positions						Certifications	Album
Title	Year	US	US R&B/HH	AUS	CAN	IRE	NZ	Certifications	Album
"F*ck Your Feelings"	2014	—	—	—	—	—	—		Non-album singles
"Finally Home" (featuring Trae tha Truth)	2014	—	—	—	—	—	—		Non-album singles
"Intervention"	2014	—	—	—	—	—	—		Non-album singles
"Ross Capicchioni"	2015	—	—	—	—	—	—		Along Came Joyner
"Half Ni*ga"	2015	—	—	—	—	—	—		Along Came Joyner
"Happy Birthday"	2015	—	—	—	—	—	—		Non-album single
"I'm Sorry"	2016	—	—	—	—	—	—		508-507-2209
"Say Hello to Adele"	2016	—	—	—	—	—	—		Non-album single
"Ultrasound"	2017	—	—	—	—	—	—		508-507-2209
"Just Like You"	2017	—	—	—	—	—	—		508-507-2209
"Winter Blues"	2017	—	—	—	—	—	—		508-507-2209
"I'm Not Racist"	2017	—	—	—	—	—	—	RIAA: Gold	Non-album singles
"Stranger Things" (with Chris Brown)	2018	91	46	100	75	—	—	RIAA: Gold; RMNZ: Platinum	Non-album singles
"Frozen"	2018	—	—	—	—	—	—		Non-album singles
"I Don't Die" (with Chris Brown)	2018	— (Note: "I Don't Die" did not enter the Billboard Hot 100, but peaked at number eight on the Bubbling Under Hot 100 chart.)	— (Note: "I Don't Die" did not enter the Billboard Hot R&B/Hip-Hop Songs chart, but peaked at number five on the Bubbling Under R&B/Hip-Hop Singles chart.)	—	—	—	—	RMNZ: Gold	Non-album singles
"I Love"	2018	— (Note: "I Love" did not enter the Billboard Hot 100, but peaked at number ten on the Bubbling Under Hot 100 chart.)	— (Note: "I Love" did not enter the Billboard Hot R&B/Hip-Hop Songs chart, but peaked at number seven on the Bubbling Under R&B/Hip-Hop Singles chart.)	—	77	78	— (Note: "I Love" did not enter the NZ Top 40 Singles Chart, but peaked at number 15 on the NZ Hot Singles Chart.)	RIAA: Platinum; RMNZ: Gold	ADHD
"Just Let Go" (with Chris Brown)	2019	—	—	—	—	—	— (Note: "Just Let Go" did not enter the NZ Top 40 Singles Chart, but peaked at number 16 on the NZ Hot Singles Chart.)		Non-album single
"Devil's Work"	2019	— (Note: "Devil's Work" did not enter the Billboard Hot 100, but peaked at number five on the Bubbling Under Hot 100 chart.)	46	—	—	72	— (Note: "Devil's Work" did not enter the NZ Top 40 Singles Chart, but peaked at number seven on the NZ Hot Singles Chart.)	RIAA: Gold	ADHD
"ISIS" (featuring Logic)	2019	59	24	41	39	26	28	RIAA: 2× Platinum; ARIA: Gold; BPI: Silver; RMNZ: Platinum	ADHD
"Broke and Stupid"	2019	—	—	—	—	100	— (Note: "Broke and Stupid" did not enter the NZ Top 40 Singles Chart, but peaked at number 34 on the NZ Hot Singles Chart.)		ADHD
"10 Bands" (featuring Timbaland)	2019	—	—	—	—	—	— (Note: "10 Bands" did not enter the NZ Top 40 Singles Chart, but peaked at number 33 on the NZ Hot Singles Chart.)		ADHD
"ADHD"	2019	—	—	—	—	—	— (Note: "ADHD" did not enter the NZ Top 40 Singles Chart, but peaked at number 17 on the NZ Hot Singles Chart.)	RIAA: Platinum; RMNZ: Gold	ADHD
"Revenge"	2020	—	—	—	—	—	— (Note: "Revenge" did not enter the NZ Top 40 Singles Chart, but peaked at number 27 on the NZ Hot Singles Chart.)	RIAA: Gold	ADHD
"Lotto" (solo or remix featuring Yandel and G-Eazy)	2020	—	—	—	—	—	— (Note: "Lotto" did not enter the NZ Top 40 Singles Chart, but peaked at number 37 on the NZ Hot Singles Chart.)	RIAA: Gold	ADHD
"Will" (solo or remix with Will Smith)	2020	— (Note: "Will" did not enter the Billboard Hot 100, but peaked at number two on the Bubbling Under Hot 100 chart.)	48	65	92	72	— (Note: "Will" did not enter the NZ Top 40 Singles Chart, but peaked at number 11 on the NZ Hot Singles Chart.)	RIAA: Gold	ADHD
"Fall Slowly" (featuring Ashanti)	2020	—	—	—	—	—	—	RIAA: Gold	Evolution
"Snitch"	2020	—	—	—	—	—	—		Evolution
"Ramen & OJ" (with Lil Baby)	2021	67	30	—	56	84	— (Note: "Ramen & OJ" did not enter the NZ Top 40 Singles Chart, but peaked at number 11 on the NZ Hot Singles Chart.)	RIAA: Platinum; RMNZ: Gold	Non-album singles
"Dreams Unfold" (with Lil Tjay)	2021	—	—	—	—	—	— (Note: "Dreams Unfold" did not enter the NZ Top 40 Singles Chart, but peaked at number 24 on the NZ Hot Singles Chart.)		Non-album singles
"Your Heart" (with J. Cole)	2021	32	10	72	34	56	— (Note: "Your Heart" did not enter the NZ Top 40 Singles Chart, but peaked at number three on the NZ Hot Singles Chart.)	RIAA: Platinum	Non-album singles
"Late to the Party" (with Ty Dolla Sign)	2021	—	—	—	—	—	— (Note: "Late to the Party" did not enter the NZ Top 40 Singles Chart, but peaked at number 10 on the NZ Hot Singles Chart.)		Non-album singles
"Duck Duck Goose"	2021	—	—	—	—	—	— (Note: "Duck Duck Goose" did not enter the NZ Top 40 Singles Chart, but peaked at number 21 on the NZ Hot Singles Chart.)		Non-album singles
"Rambo" (with Lil Durk)	2021	—	—	—	—	—	— (Note: "Rambo" did not enter the NZ Top 40 Singles Chart, but peaked at number 34 on the NZ Hot Singles Chart.)		Non-album singles
"My Escape"	2021	—	—	—	—	—	— (Note: "My Escape" did not enter the NZ Top 40 Singles Chart, but peaked at number 37 on the NZ Hot Singles Chart.)		Non-album singles
"Devil's Work 2"	2023	—	—	—	—	—	— (Note: "Devil's Work 2" did not enter the NZ Top 40 Singles Chart, but peaked at number 24 on the NZ Hot Singles Chart.)		Non-album singles
"Blackout" (with Future)	2023	—	—	—	—	—	— (Note: "Blackout" did not enter the NZ Top 40 Singles Chart, but peaked at number 23 on the NZ Hot Singles Chart.)		Non-album singles
"What's That?"	2023	—	—	—	—	—	—		Not Now, I'm Busy
"Cut U Off" (with YoungBoy Never Broke Again)	2023	—	—	—	—	—	— (Note: "Cut U Off" did not enter the NZ Top 40 Singles Chart, but peaked at number 27 on the NZ Hot Singles Chart.)		Not Now, I'm Busy
"Broski"	2023	—	—	—	—	—	—		Not Now, I'm Busy
"Seventeen"	2023	—	—	—	—	—	— (Note: "Seventeen" did not enter the NZ Top 40 Singles Chart, but peaked at number 24 on the NZ Hot Singles Chart.)		Not Now, I'm Busy
"24 Hours to Live"	2023	—	—	—	—	—	— (Note: "24 Hours to Live" did not enter the NZ Top 40 Singles Chart, but peaked at number 27 on the NZ Hot Singles Chart.)		Not Now, I'm Busy
"Sticks & Stones" (with Conway the Machine)	2024	—	—	—	—	—	— (Note: "Sticks & Stones" did not enter the NZ Top 40 Singles Chart, but peaked at number 38 on the NZ Hot Singles Chart.)		Not Now, I'm Busy
"Best for Me" (with Jelly Roll)	2024	93	40	—	—	—	— (Note: "Best for Me" did not enter the NZ Top 40 Singles Chart, but peaked at number 30 on the NZ Hot Singles Chart.)	RIAA: Gold	Not Now, I'm Busy
"Tantrum" (with Will Smith)	2024	—	—	—	—	—	—		Based on a True Story
"Bring Out the Worst" (with DMX)	2025	—	—	—	—	—	—		TBA
"One of Them"	2025	—	—	—	—	—	—		ADHD 2
"White Noise"	2025	—	—	—	—	—	— (Note: "White Noise" did not enter the NZ Top 40 Singles Chart, but peaked at number 34 on the NZ Hot Singles Chart.)		ADHD 2
"Time Is Money" (with J Balvin, DaBaby and Fireboy DML)	2025	—	—	—	—	—	—		ADHD 2
"Nobody Cares"	2025	—	—	—	—	—	—		Non-album singles
"Round 2 K.O"	2025	—	—	—	—	—	—		Non-album singles
"Monsters"	2026	—	—	—	—	—	—		ADHD 2 (Reloaded)
"GTA 6"	2026	—	—	—	—	—	— (Note: "GTA 6" did not enter the NZ Top 40 Singles Chart, but peaked at number 20 on the NZ Hot Singles Chart.)		ADHD 2 (Reloaded)

=== As featured artist ===
Title	Year	Peak chart positions							Certifications	Album
Title	Year	US	AUS	CAN	IRL	NZ	SWE	UK	Certifications	Album
"Great Expectations" (Cyrus the Great & Skyzoo featuring Joyner Lucas)	2015	—	—	—	—	—	—	—		King Kong Ain't Got Shit On Me
"Deserve" (Kyle Bent featuring Joyner Lucas)	2016	—	—	—	—	—	—	—		Non-album single
"Sriracha" (Tech N9ne featuring Logic and Joyner Lucas)	2016	—	—	—	—	—	—	—		The Storm
"Goddamn Remix" (Feva Da General featuring Joyner Lucas)	2016	—	—	—	—	—	—	—		Non-album singles
"Expectations" (Snax & Diri featuring Joyner Lucas)	2016	—	—	—	—	—	—	—		Non-album singles
"Cut so Deep" (Snax & Diri featuring Joyner Lucas)	2016	—	—	—	—	—	—	—		Non-album singles
"Ain't My Girlfriend" (Too Short featuring Ty Dolla Sign, Jeremih, French Montana and Joyner Lucas)	2016	—	—	—	—	—	—	—		The Pimp Tape
"Love Bang" (Trey Trilla featuring Joyner Lucas)	2017	—	—	—	—	—	—	—		Non-album singles
"Last Week" (Shallo Mac & Scrap Doe featuring Joyner Lucas)	2017	—	—	—	—	—	—	—		Non-album singles
"Lifestyle" (Kyle Bent featuring Joyner Lucas)	2017	—	—	—	—	—	—	—		Non-album singles
"Motion" (Young RJ featuring Joyner Lucas & Earlly Mac)	2017	—	—	—	—	—	—	—		Blac Royalty
"Run It" (Meek Mill featuring Joyner Lucas)	2017	—	—	—	—	—	—	—		Non-album singles
"Juice Remix" (Ycee featuring Joyner Lucas)	2018	—	—	—	—	—	—	—		Non-album singles
"Lucky You" (Eminem featuring Joyner Lucas)	2018	6	4	3	7	2	3	6	RIAA: 3× Platinum; ARIA: 4× Platinum; MC: Platinum; BPI: Platinum; RMNZ: 2× Platinum	Kamikaze (Note: Lucky You also appears on Curtain Call 2)
"We're Tired" (The Blancos featuring Joyner Lucas)	2018	—	—	—	—	—	—	—		Non-album singles
"Cool It" (Bel Air featuring Joyner Lucas)	2019	—	—	—	—	—	—	—		Non-album singles
"DOA" (I Prevail featuring Joyner Lucas)	2020	—	—	—	—	—	—	—		Non-album singles
"Scared of Us" (Khao featuring Joyner Lucas, T.I., PBD Gray & J Morris)	2020	—	—	—	—	—	—	—		Non-album singles
"Slow Down" (Elijah James featuring Joyner Lucas)	2020	—	—	—	—	—	—	—		Anomaly
"I Stand On That" (E-40 & T.I. featuring Joyner Lucas)	2020	—	—	—	—	—	—	—		Non-album singles
"Fed Up" (Sip featuring Joyner Lucas)	2020	—	—	—	—	—	—	—		Non-album singles
"Luv Bang" (Trey Trilla featuring Joyner Lucas)	2022	—	—	—	—	—	—	—		Non-album singles

=== Remixes ===
List of remixes
Original	Original Release	Remix	Year Remixed
"Panda" (by Desiigner)	2016	"Kill The Panda" (by Joyner Lucas)	2016
"Mask Off" (by Future)	2017	"Mask On" (by Joyner Lucas)	2017
"DNA" (by Kendrick Lamar)	2017	"DNA (Remix)" (by Joyner Lucas)	2017
"Gucci Gang" (by Lil Pump)	2017	"Gucci Gang (Remix)" (by Joyner Lucas)	2017
"Bank Account" (by 21 Savage)	2017	"Bank Account (Remix)" (by Joyner Lucas)	2017
"Look Alive" (by BlocBoy JB & Drake)	2018	"Look Alive (Remix)" (by Joyner Lucas)	2018
"Litty" (by Meek Mill & Tory Lanez)	2016	"Litty Freestyle" (by Joyner Lucas)	2018
"Zeze" (by Kodak Black, Travis Scott & Offset)	2018	"ZeZe (Tory Lanez Diss)" (by Joyner Lucas)	2018
"Suge" (by DaBaby)	2019	"Suge (Remix)" (by Joyner Lucas & Tory Lanez)	2019
"Lotto" (by Joyner Lucas)	2020	"Lotto (Remix)" (by Joyner Lucas, G-Eazy & Yandel)	2020
"Will" (by Joyner Lucas)	2020	"Will (Remix)" (by Joyner Lucas & Will Smith)	2020
"What's Poppin" (by Jack Harlow)	2020	"What's Gucci" (by Joyner Lucas)	2020
"Back in Blood" (by Pooh Shiesty & Lil Durk)	2021	"Back in Blood (Remix)" (by Joyner Lucas)	2021
"ISIS" (by Joyner Lucas & Logic)	2020	"ISIS (Remix)" (by Joyner Lucas, Starringo, Catra, Lex Bratcher & Kvng Moses)	2022

== Other charted songs ==
List of other charted songs
Title	Year	Peak chart positions	Album
Title	Year	NZ Hot	Album
"Need a Stack" (Chris Brown featuring Lil Wayne and Joyner Lucas)	2019	11	Indigo
"The War" (featuring Young Thug)	2020	26	ADHD
"Finally" (featuring Chris Brown)	2020	21	ADHD
"Ye Not Crazy" (Note: Was removed off of all platforms shortly after release.)	2022	21	—N/a
"Tear Me Down" (featuring Ava Max)	2025	30	ADHD 2
"Hate Me" (featuring T-Pain)	2025	37	ADHD 2

== Guest appearances ==
List of non-single guest appearances, with other performing artists, showing year released and album name
Title	Year	Other artist(s)	Album
"I'm Home Now"	2016	DJ Prince	Saturday Morning Cartoons
"What It All Worth"	2016	Tom Francis, Demrick	Underestimated
"Tec in the Church"	2016	Jarren Benton, Locksmith	Slow Motion, Vol. 2
"Until I Die"	2016	Agrace	Don't Look Back
"Faded Endings"	2017	iLLiZeM	2 Bics, 2 Papers
"Don't Run"	2017	Statik Selektah	8
"Wrote My Way Out" (Remix)	2018	Lin-Manuel Miranda, Royce da 5'9", Black Thought, Aloe Blacc	Hamilton Mixtape
"Don't Shoot"	2018	Too Short, ScHoolboy Q	The Pimp Tape
"Need a Stack"	2019	Chris Brown, Lil Wayne	Indigo
"NorthStar (Remix)"	2019	XXXTentacion	Bad Vibes Forever
"Lady Killa"	2019	Jae Von	The Late Show
"Darling"	2021	Izo	Lie
"Shoot My Shot"	2021	None	Space Jam: A New Legacy (Original Motion Picture Soundtrack)
"Knock"	2023	Tech N9ne, Conway the Machine, X-Raided	Bliss
"Freak"	2024	Chris Brown, Lil Wayne, Tee Grizzley	11:11 (Deluxe)
"Big League"	2025	Grafh	Non-album single
"Corleone"	2025	Millyz	Non-album single
"TRAFFIC"	2026	Dave East	Non-album single

== Music videos ==
Year	Title	Release date	Director	Artist(s)
As lead artist
2014	"Don't Shoot"	September 6, 2014	Himself	—N/a
2014	"Riding Solo"	October 27, 2014	Motion Family	Busy Signal
2015	"Mansion"	April 7, 2015	Kariuki Media	—N/a
2015	"Ross Capicchioni"	May 20, 2015	Motion Family	—N/a
2015	"Backwards"	June 17, 2015	Kariuki Media	—N/a
2015	"Long Way"	July 21, 2015	Adio Ash	—N/a
2015	"Champagne For Everybody"	November 9, 2015	Ben Proulx	—N/a
2015	"Happy Birthday"	December 2, 2015	Ben Proulx & Himself	—N/a
2016	"I'm Sorry"	August 12, 2016	Ben Proulx & Himself	—N/a
2017	"Ultrasound"	March 31, 2017	Ben Proulx & Himself	—N/a
2017	"Just Like You"	May 19, 2017	Ben Proulx & Himself	—N/a
2017	"Keep It 100"	June 16, 2017	Unknown	—N/a
2017	"Forever"	August 10, 2017	Ben Proulx & Himself	—N/a
2017	"Winter Blues"	October 23, 2017	Ben Proulx & Himself	—N/a
2017	"I'm Not Racist"	November 28, 2017	Ben Proulx & Himself	—N/a
2018	"Stranger Things"	February 25, 2018	Ben Proulx & Himself	Chris Brown
2018	"Frozen"	April 1, 2018	Ben Proulx & Himself	—N/a
2018	"I Don't Die"	May 2, 2018	Ben Proulx & Himself	Chris Brown
2018	"I Love"	October 17, 2018	Ben Proulx & Himself	—N/a
2019	"Just Let Go"	January 31, 2019	Ben Proulx & Himself	Chris Brown
2019	"Devil's Work"	May 2, 2019	Ben Proulx & Himself	—N/a
2019	"ISIS"	May 23, 2019	Ben Proulx & Himself	Logic
2019	"Broke and Stupid"	June 27, 2019	Ben Proulx & Himself	—N/a
2019	"10 Bands"	July 11, 2019	Ben Proulx & Himself	Timbaland
2019	"ADHD"	December 13, 2019	Ben Proulx & Himself	—N/a
2020	"Revenge"	February 11, 2020	Ben Proulx & Himself	—N/a
2020	"Lotto"	March 11, 2020	Ben Proulx & Himself	—N/a
2020	"Will"	March 25, 2020	Ben Proulx & Himself	—N/a
2020	"Fall Slowly"	September 2, 2020	Ben Proulx & Himself	Ashanti
2020	"Snitch"	October 21, 2020	Ben Proulx & Himself	—N/a
2020	"Like A River"	December 9, 2020	Ben Proulx & Himself	Elijah James
2021	"Ramen & OJ"	April 30, 2021	Ben Proulx & Himself	Lil Baby
2021	"Zim Zimma"	May 18, 2021	Ben Proulx & Himself	—N/a
2021	"Legend"	June 23, 2021	Ben Proulx & Himself	Rick Ross
2021	"Your Heart"	September 24, 2021	Himself	J. Cole
2021	"Late To The Party"	October 8, 2021	Himself	Ty Dolla Sign
2021	"Duck Duck Goose"	October 29, 2021	Himself	—N/a
2022	"Str8 Like Dat"	September 14, 2022	Himself	—N/a
2023	"Devil's Work 2"	March 10, 2023	Himself	—N/a
2023	"Blackout"	April 7, 2023	Himself	Future
2023	"Broski"	June 23, 2023	Himself	—N/a
2023	"Seventeen"	September 8, 2023	Unknown	—N/a
2023	"24 hours to live"	October 30, 2023	Trevor Finney	—N/a
2024	"Sticks & Stones"	March 1, 2024	Trevor Finney	Conway the Machine
2024	"Best For Me"	March 18, 2024	Himself & Trevor Finney	Jelly Roll
2024	"Three Little Pigs"	June 17, 2024	A Cartuna Cartoon	—N/a
2025	"White Noise"	June 27, 2025	Himself	—N/a
2025	"Tear Me Down"	July 18, 2025	Regina Hall	Ava Max
As featured artist
2018	"Ain't My Girlfriend"	August 23, 2018	Unknown	Too Short, Jeremih, French Montana
2018	"We're Tired"	September 7, 2018	Patrick Tohill	The Blancos
2018	"Lucky You"	September 13, 2018	James Larese	Eminem
2020	"DOA"	May 28, 2020	Ben Proulx	I Prevail
2021	"I Stand On That"	March 15, 2021	Jae Synth	E-40, T.I.
