= Street Dance Girls Fighter 2 =

South Korean dance survival show

- Promotional poster
- Hangul: 스트릿댄스 걸스 파이터 2
- RR: Seuteurit daenseu geolseu paiteo 2
- MR: Sŭt'ŭrit taensŭ kŏlsŭ p'ait'ŏ 2
- Genre: Reality competition
- Presented by: Kang Daniel
- Country of origin: South Korea
- Original language: Korean
- No. of episodes: 6

Production
- Production companies: CJ ENM; LUYWORKS Media

Original release
- Network: Mnet
- Release: November 21 – December 26, 2023

Related
- Street Dance Girls Fighter; Street Woman Fighter 2

Street Dance Girls Fighter 2 (Korean: 스트릿댄스 걸스 파이터 2) is a spin-off of South Korean dance survival program Street Woman Fighter 2 that premiered on Mnet on November 21, 2023 and aired every Tuesday at 22:00 KST. Female dance crews composed of high school teen-aged girls compete to become the top teenage dance crew. The winning crew receives a ₩10,000,000 scholarship, and the Street Dance Girls Fighter Trophy.

== Cast ==
The program is presented by Kang Daniel and the teenage dance crews are led by Crew Masters consisting of the participating dance crews from the final four of Street Woman Fighter 2, also from Street Woman Fighter season 1; LACHICA and Hook.

Crew	Crew Masters
Mannequeen	**Funky Y**, Redlic, Waackxxxy, Yoonji
Bebe	**Bada**, Lusher, Tatter
1Million	**Lia Kim**, Harimu, Lee Yoo Jeong
Hook	**Aiki**, Sung Ji Yeon, Odd
Jam Republic	**Kirsten**, Latrice, Audrey
LACHICA	**Gabee**, Rian, Simeez

*Bold - Leader

Waackxxxy (Guest Episode 3-4)

== Mission ==
=== Intro: Team Trials ===
Rules for the Team Trial
- The dancers in the team trials will stand on the stage in order and show the six crew master teams a prepared performance.
- Ten seconds before the performance ends, each master team will decide.
- If the master likes the performance she'll press the button, you must get 4 out of 6 in buttons from the master teams to pass the team trials.
- The dancers will join the team of their choosing, so they must make their choice discreetly.
- In the other hand the crew that fails to earn four or more in buttons will be eliminated instantly.

Performance List (The board of the crews correspond to the representative colours of the Crew Masters they joined; black boards signify eliminated crews.)
Crew	Members	Song	Original Artists
Feedback (Note: They are a 5 person crew from a famous dance studio called Studio F.)	5	"Yeah!"	Usher
No Lip (Note: They chose "JAM REPUBLIC" as their crew masters. They are a 6 person crew that has won a lot of awards, winning a total of 39 competitions. They also represented Korea in HHI 2023 also known as Hip Hip International 2023 in US, out of 70 teams they ranked 10th place. They also ranked second in the BBIC World Finals and won first place in Beat One, earning the nickname Prize Money Hunter.)	6	"The Box"	Roddy Ricch
Noyus (Note: They are a 9 person crew that is representing Busan. They are also a sister crew of NYX that participated in season 1.)	9	"Tank!" (Cowboy Bebop OST)	Seatbelts
Ohh! (Note: The crew cited to continues a legacy from a crew called H in season 1.)	5	"Ye x4"	Blxckie and Nasty C
Nataraja V (Note: The crew originated from Busan and has a long history in street dancing.)	6	"Jam"	Michael Jackson
En Beatz (Note: Two crew members "Shieri & Roseline" participated in JAM REPUBLIC's Mega Crew Mission. and One of the members named Bella (Also Known as "Black Isabella") ranked top 10 in the HHI World Championship, placing 9th in the youth dance portion.)	7	"Barbie World"	Nicki Minaj & Ice Spice
Yamada Ria (Note: Individual Dancer from Japan, well known for wearing two caps cited she wants to develop her style or fashion that is different from others. She also placed first with a score of 99.7 points in Body Rock Junior Competition.)	Individual	"Lazarus"	Trip Lee
Liu Amy (Note: Individual Dancer from China. She became popular when she danced to the River By Bishop Briggs receiving millions of views. and She notably appeared on "The Ellen DeGeneres Show". and also appeared in Sia's music video when she was in elementary school.)	Individual	"Isis" (DongskieMuzik Remix)	Joyner Lucas
Hexagon (Note: Member Jiyul is originally a member of M.S.G Crew but she left and joined HEXAGON.)	6	"Digital Khan"	Lim Kim
M.S.G (Note: One of their members Nara was part of 1MILLION's Mega Crew Mission, in Street Woman Fighter 2 she was also the structure master in that mission.)	7	"Bicycle Ride" (Soca Remix)	Vybz Kartel & Bunji Garlin
Soulical	7	Unaired Performance	Unaired Performance
Slay	Unaired Performance	Unaired Performance	
Kim Yu Bin	Individual	Unaired Performance	Unaired Performance
Kim Ga Ram	Individual	Unaired Performance	Unaired Performance
Kim Ji Hye	Individual	Unaired Performance	Unaired Performance
Lee So Mi	Individual	"A Palé"	Rosalia
JustJerk Rookies (Note: The crew is affiliated with JustJerk Crew who won Street Man Fighter.)	7	"Zoo"	Taeyong, Jeno, Hendry, YangYang and Giselle
Humble	7	"Temple"	Baauer (feat. M.I.A. & G-Dragon)
Sienna Miroforidis	Individual	"Lose Control"	Missy Elliott (feat. Ciara and Fatman Scoop)
Koyama Miyabi (Note: Individual Dancer from Japan.)	Individual	"Deep"	Hyoyeon
The Queens		"Savage"	Bahari
Sato Rana	Individual	"Money In The Grave"	Drake (feat. Rick Ross)
Venture (Note: Leader Yoon In-jeong is a Former Contestant in the Last Season as a Member of AMAZON.)		"Digital Khan"	Lim Kim
4Cus		Unaired Performance	Unaired Performance
NASA	5	Unaired Performance	Unaired Performance
Brand New Child		Unaired Performance	Unaired Performance
Well Boss	4	Unaired Performance	Unaired Performance
All That Street	13	Unaired Performance	Unaired Performance
Bow	5	Unaired Performance	Unaired Performance
Solid	6	Unaired Performance	Unaired Performance
Two Way		Unaired Performance	Unaired Performance
Scoop	2	Unaired Performance	Unaired Performance
Charm	7	Unaired Performance	Unaired Performance
Choi Ye Eun	Individual	Unaired Performance	Unaired Performance

Results Board
Crew	1MILLION	LACHICA	BEBE	MANNEQUEEN	JAM REPUBLIC	HOOK
FEEDBACK	✔	✔	✘	✘	✔	✘
No Lip	✔	✔	✔	✔	★	✔
Noyus	✘	✔	✔	✘	✘	✔
Ohh!	✘	✔	✘	✔	✘	✔
Nataraja V	★	✔	✘	✔	✔	✔
En Beatz	✔	✔	✘ (Note: Originally wanted to press the button, however, they got distracted at the last second.)	✔	★	✔
Yamada Ria	✔	✔	✘	✔	★	✔
Liu Amy	✘	✔	★	✔	✔	✘
Hexagon	✔	✘	✘	✔	✔	✘
M.S.G	✔	✔	✔	★	✔	✘
Soulical	✘ (Note: It's unknown which Crew masters Voted IN (only 2) But they did Receive Less than 4 IN thus they were eliminated on the spot.)					
Slay	✘ (Note: It's unknown which Crew masters Voted IN (only 2) But they did Receive Less than 4 IN thus they were eliminated on the spot.)					
Kim Yu Bin	✘ (Note: She did not any IN thus they were eliminated on the spot.)					
Kim Ga Ram	★ (Note: In Episode 2, it's shown that she was in 1MILLION's grouping.)	? (Note: It's unknown which Crew masters Voted IN But they did Receive 4 or More IN thus they pass to the next round.)				
Kim Ji Hye	✔	✔	✔	✔	✔	✔
Lee So Min	★	✔	✔	✔	✔	✔
JustJerk Rookies	✔	✔	★	✔	✔	✔
Humble	✘	✔	✔	★	✘	✔
Sienna Miroforidis	✔	✔	✔	✔	★	✔
Koyama Miyabi	✔	✔	✘	✔	★	✔
The Queens	✔	★	✔	✔	✔	✔
Sato Rana	✘	✔	★	✔	✔	✘
Venture	★	✔	✘	✔	✔	✔
4CUS	? (Note: It's unknown which Crew masters Voted IN But they did Receive 4 or More IN thus they pass to the next round.)			★ (Note: In Episode 2, it's shown that they were in MANNEQUEEN's grouping.)	? (Note: It's unknown which Crew masters Voted IN But they did Receive 4 or More IN thus they pass to the next round.)	
NASA	? (Note: It's unknown which Crew masters Voted IN But they did Receive 4 or More IN thus they pass to the next round.)		★ (Note: In Episode 2, it's shown that they were in BEBE's grouping.)	? (Note: It's unknown which Crew masters Voted IN But they did Receive 4 or More IN thus they pass to the next round.)		
Brand New Child	? (Note: It's unknown which Crew masters Voted IN But they did Receive 4 or More IN thus they pass to the next round.)					★ (Note: In Episode 2, it's shown that they were in HOOK's grouping.)
Well Boss	? (Note: It's unknown which Crew masters Voted IN But they did Receive 4 or More IN thus they pass to the next round.)					★ (Note: In Episode 2, it's shown that they were in HOOK's grouping.)
All That Street	? (Note: It's unknown which Crew masters Voted IN But they did Receive 4 or More IN thus they pass to the next round.)					★ (Note: In Episode 2, it's shown that they were in HOOK's grouping.)
Bow	? (Note: It's unknown which Crew masters Voted IN But they did Receive 4 or More IN thus they pass to the next round.)					★ (Note: In Episode 2, it's shown that they were in HOOK's grouping.)
Solid	? (Note: It's unknown which Crew masters Voted IN But they did Receive 4 or More IN thus they pass to the next round.)	★ (Note: In Episode 2, it's shown that they were in LACHICA's grouping.)	? (Note: It's unknown which Crew masters Voted IN But they did Receive 4 or More IN thus they pass to the next round.)			
Two Way	? (Note: It's unknown which Crew masters Voted IN But they did Receive 4 or More IN thus they pass to the next round.)			★ (Note: In Episode 2, it's shown that they were in MANNEQUEEN's grouping.)	? (Note: It's unknown which Crew masters Voted IN But they did Receive 4 or More IN thus they pass to the next round.)	
Scoop	✔	✔	★ (Note: In Episode 2, it's shown that they were in BEBE's grouping. It is also shown that they received an ALL IN.)	✔	✔	✔
Charm	? (Note: It's unknown which Crew masters Voted IN But they did Receive 4 or More IN thus they pass to the next round.)		★ (Note: In Episode 2, it's shown that they were in BEBE's grouping.)	? (Note: It's unknown which Crew masters Voted IN But they did Receive 4 or More IN thus they pass to the next round.)		
Choi Ye Eun	✔	✔	★ (Note: In Episode 2, it's shown that they were in BEBE's grouping. It is also shown that they received an ALL IN.)	✔	✔	✔

Key

✔	Crew Masters that pressed the IN button
✘	Crew Masters that did not press the IN button
★	The Crew Masters chosen by each team
	Crew that received an ALL IN
	Crew that did not have 4 or more IN buttons (Eliminated)

=== Intro: Final Selection Battle ===
Rules for the Final Selection Battle
- Master Crews will need to organise a battle among their own crews in order to select only 7 members each to move on to the next round.
- Each team will be disbanded so that the Master Crews will select individually.
- Every individual in the team will need to dance in front of the Master Crews to choose their 7 members.
- Teenage dance crews were not selected by any Master Crews are eliminated on the spot.

==== Part 1: MANNEQUEEN ====
Rules for MANNEQUEEN's Selection Battle
- A 5 minute Cypher: A total of 32 contestants will make 4 groups of 8 contestants. Each group will be given 5 minutes and within that given time, anyone can dance freely.
- The winner is selected and the remaining contestants are eliminated.

Cypher Battle
Group	Contestant	Song	Original Artist	Results
1	Gil So Yeon (4CUS)	"Hardcore" + "Boys" + "Bel Mercy"	Tropkillaz & Lizzo + Jengi	FAIL
1	Kang Eun Sol (4CUS)	"Hardcore" + "Boys" + "Bel Mercy"	Tropkillaz & Lizzo + Jengi	FAIL
1	Kim Soo Jung (Humble)	"Hardcore" + "Boys" + "Bel Mercy"	Tropkillaz & Lizzo + Jengi	JOIN
1	Choi Ye Ji (Humble)	"Hardcore" + "Boys" + "Bel Mercy"	Tropkillaz & Lizzo + Jengi	FAIL
1	Shin Dan Bi (Two Way)	"Hardcore" + "Boys" + "Bel Mercy"	Tropkillaz & Lizzo + Jengi	JOIN
1	Kim Soo Min (Two Way)	"Hardcore" + "Boys" + "Bel Mercy"	Tropkillaz & Lizzo + Jengi	FAIL
1	Lee Na Ra (M.S.G.)	"Hardcore" + "Boys" + "Bel Mercy"	Tropkillaz & Lizzo + Jengi	JOIN
1	Kim Joo Eun (M.S.G.)	"Hardcore" + "Boys" + "Bel Mercy"	Tropkillaz & Lizzo + Jengi	FAIL
2	Kim Hye Rin (M.S.G.)	"Raingurl" + "Bicycle Ride (Soca Remix)"	Yaeji & Vybz Kartel (and Bunji Garlin)	JOIN
2	Bang Ji Min (Humble) (Note: Unaired; It is unknown what Group she was placed in)	"Raingurl" + "Bicycle Ride (Soca Remix)"	Yaeji & Vybz Kartel (and Bunji Garlin)	JOIN
2	Hwang Ye Ji (Humble) (Note: Unaired; It is unknown what Group she was placed in)	"Raingurl" + "Bicycle Ride (Soca Remix)"	Yaeji & Vybz Kartel (and Bunji Garlin)	JOIN
2	Kim Hee Jae (Humble) (Note: Unaired; It is unknown what Group she was placed in)	"Raingurl" + "Bicycle Ride (Soca Remix)"	Yaeji & Vybz Kartel (and Bunji Garlin)	JOIN
2	? (Note: The other contestants were not named.)	"Raingurl" + "Bicycle Ride (Soca Remix)"	Yaeji & Vybz Kartel (and Bunji Garlin)	FAIL
3 (Note: The other group cyphers were not aired.)	? (Note: The other contestants were not named.)	?	?	FAIL
4 (Note: The other group cyphers were not aired.)	? (Note: The other contestants were not named.)	?	?	FAIL

==== Part 2: LACHICA ====
Rules for LACHICA's Selection Battle
- A total of 15 contestants will be separated into 4 groups of 3-4 contestants (LACHICA decided the members).
- They have to come up with a dance for the song "I AM" by IVE. This can be a choreography or a freestyle dance.
- The winner is selected and the remaining contestants are eliminated.

Freestyle/Choreography Battle
Group	Contestant	Song	Original Artist	Results
1	Jeon Ho Yeon (The Queens)	"I AM"	IVE	JOIN
1	Kim Yoo Kyung (Solid)	"I AM"	IVE	JOIN
1	Lee Hyun Seo (Solid)	"I AM"	IVE	JOIN
2	Kwon Jin Yoon (The Queens)	"I AM"	IVE	FAIL
2	Han Ji Won (The Queens)	"I AM"	IVE	FAIL
2	Kim Ji Seo (Solid)	"I AM"	IVE	FAIL
2	Cho Hye Jin (Solid)	"I AM"	IVE	JOIN
3 (Note: The other group cyphers were not aired.)	Eom Se Jung (Solid) (Note: Unaired; It is unknown what Group she was placed in)	"I AM"	IVE	JOIN
3	Park So Yoon (The Queens) (Note: Unaired; It is unknown what Group she was placed in)	"I AM"	IVE	JOIN
3	Joo Hyo Rin (The Queens) (Note: Unaired; It is unknown what Group she was placed in)	"I AM"	IVE	JOIN
3	? (Note: The other contestants were not named.)	"I AM"	IVE	FAIL
4 (Note: The other group cyphers were not aired.)	? (Note: The other contestants were not named.)	"I AM"	IVE	FAIL

==== Part 3: BEBE ====
Rules for BEBE's Selection Battle
- A total of 23 contestants will be grouped up and partake in a freestyle dance. A song will be played for 1 minute.
- The winner is selected and the remaining contestants are eliminated.

Freestyle Battle
Group	Contestant	Song	Original Artist	Results
1	Park Eun Seo (JustJerk Rookies)	"Don't Call Me"	SHINee	JOIN
1	Lee Ga Young (NASA)	"Don't Call Me"	SHINee	JOIN
1	? (Note: The other contestants were not named.)	"Don't Call Me"	SHINee	FAIL
2	Yoo Seung Ju (CHARM)	"Forgive Me"	BoA	JOIN
2	Park Seo Yeon (JustJerk Rookies)	"Forgive Me"	BoA	JOIN
2	Amy Liu	"Forgive Me"	BoA	FAIL
2	Ko A Ra (NASA)	"Forgive Me"	BoA	JOIN
3	Sato Rana	"Lemonade"	NCT 127	JOIN
3	Lee Chae Won (NASA)	"Lemonade"	NCT 127	JOIN
3	Kim Si Eun	"Lemonade"	NCT 127	FAIL
3	Min Ji Hyung	"Lemonade"	NCT 127	FAIL
4 (Note: The other group cyphers were not aired.)	? (Note: The other contestants were not named.)	?	?	FAIL

==== Part 4: 1MILLION ====
Rules for 1MILLION's Selection Battle
- The contestants are given 3 song choices: "Maria" (HWASA), "TT" (TWICE), and "Gashina" (SUNMI). You can pick 1 of them for the battle.
- The contestants will be grouped against other teams that chose the same song.
- The winner is selected and the remaining contestants are eliminated.

Killing Part Choreography
Group	Contestant	Song	Original Artist	Results
? (Note: It is unknown how the groups were distinguished. Only clips of battles were aired.)	Sim Ha Neul (VENTURE)	"Maria" + "TT" + "Gashina"	Hwasa + TWICE + Sunmi	JOIN
?	Kwon Kyung Min (VENTURE)	"Maria" + "TT" + "Gashina"	Hwasa + TWICE + Sunmi	JOIN
?	Choi Eun Kyung	"Maria" + "TT" + "Gashina"	Hwasa + TWICE + Sunmi	JOIN
?	Ok Eun Bin (Nataraja V)	"Maria" + "TT" + "Gashina"	Hwasa + TWICE + Sunmi	JOIN
?	Yoon In Jung (VENTURE)	"Maria" + "TT" + "Gashina"	Hwasa + TWICE + Sunmi	JOIN
?	Lee So Min	"Maria" + "TT" + "Gashina"	Hwasa + TWICE + Sunmi	JOIN
?	Lee Ji Sol (Nataraja V)	"Maria" + "TT" + "Gashina"	Hwasa + TWICE + Sunmi	JOIN
?	? (Note: The other contestants were not named.)	"Maria" + "TT" + "Gashina"	Hwasa + TWICE + Sunmi	FAIL

==== Part 5: JAM REPUBLIC ====
Rules for JAM REPUBLIC's Selection Battle
- The first battle is a cover choreography battle. Contestants are expected to learn a choreography from LaTrice and cover it in their own style.
- The second battle is a freestyle battle. The freestyle happens right after the cover is performed.
- The winner is selected and the remaining contestants are eliminated.

Cover Choreography & Freestyle
Group	Contestant	Song	Original Artist	Results
? (Note: It is unknown how the groups were distinguished. Only clips of battles were aired.)	Yamada Ria	"Gware Nao Para"	"ASSI" (and BM)	JOIN
?	Sienna Miroforidis	"Gware Nao Para"	"ASSI" (and BM)	JOIN
?	Koyama Miyabi	"Gware Nao Para"	"ASSI" (and BM)	JOIN
?	Bella (En Beatz)	"Gware Nao Para"	"ASSI" (and BM)	JOIN
?	Kim Min Jung (NO LIP)	"Gware Nao Para"	"ASSI" (and BM)	JOIN
?	Nika (En Beatz)	"Gware Nao Para"	"ASSI" (and BM)	JOIN
?	Park Eun Woo (NO LIP)	"Gware Nao Para"	"ASSI" (and BM)	JOIN
?	? (Note: The other contestants were not named.)	"Gware Nao Para"	"ASSI" (and BM)	FAIL

==== Part 6: HOOK ====
Rules for HOOK's Selection Battle
- The contestants are grouped up and will simultaneously battle each other.
- The winner is selected and the remaining contestants are eliminated.

Simultaneous Part Battle
Group	Contestant	Song	Original Artist	Results
? (Note: It is unknown how the groups were distinguished. Only clips of battles were aired.)	Kim Yoon Hye (All That Street)	"Uptown Funk" + "TWINNEM (Remix)" + "Cool Off"	Mark Ronson (feat. Bruno Mars) + Coi Leray (feat. DaBaby) + Missy Elliott	FAIL
?	Cho Ha Yeon (All That Street)	"Uptown Funk" + "TWINNEM (Remix)" + "Cool Off"	Mark Ronson (feat. Bruno Mars) + Coi Leray (feat. DaBaby) + Missy Elliott	FAIL
?	Ahn Ye Jin (Brand New Child)	"Uptown Funk" + "TWINNEM (Remix)" + "Cool Off"	Mark Ronson (feat. Bruno Mars) + Coi Leray (feat. DaBaby) + Missy Elliott	JOIN
?	Im Ja Yeon (BOW)	"Uptown Funk" + "TWINNEM (Remix)" + "Cool Off"	Mark Ronson (feat. Bruno Mars) + Coi Leray (feat. DaBaby) + Missy Elliott	FAIL
?	Seo Chae Hyung (BOW)	"Uptown Funk" + "TWINNEM (Remix)" + "Cool Off"	Mark Ronson (feat. Bruno Mars) + Coi Leray (feat. DaBaby) + Missy Elliott	JOIN
?	Chae Hee Sun (All That Street)	"Uptown Funk" + "TWINNEM (Remix)" + "Cool Off"	Mark Ronson (feat. Bruno Mars) + Coi Leray (feat. DaBaby) + Missy Elliott	FAIL
?	Moon Ji Won (Well Boss)	"Uptown Funk" + "TWINNEM (Remix)" + "Cool Off"	Mark Ronson (feat. Bruno Mars) + Coi Leray (feat. DaBaby) + Missy Elliott	FAIL
?	Kim Yeon Ju (BOW)	"Uptown Funk" + "TWINNEM (Remix)" + "Cool Off"	Mark Ronson (feat. Bruno Mars) + Coi Leray (feat. DaBaby) + Missy Elliott	JOIN
?	Ahn Soo Hyun (Brand New Child)	"Uptown Funk" + "TWINNEM (Remix)" + "Cool Off"	Mark Ronson (feat. Bruno Mars) + Coi Leray (feat. DaBaby) + Missy Elliott	FAIL
?	Seo Eun Chae (Brand New Child)	"Uptown Funk" + "TWINNEM (Remix)" + "Cool Off"	Mark Ronson (feat. Bruno Mars) + Coi Leray (feat. DaBaby) + Missy Elliott	FAIL
?	Cho Chae Won (All That Street)	"Uptown Funk" + "TWINNEM (Remix)" + "Cool Off"	Mark Ronson (feat. Bruno Mars) + Coi Leray (feat. DaBaby) + Missy Elliott	FAIL
?	Song Da Bin (Well Boss)	"Uptown Funk" + "TWINNEM (Remix)" + "Cool Off"	Mark Ronson (feat. Bruno Mars) + Coi Leray (feat. DaBaby) + Missy Elliott	JOIN
?	Kim Su Bin (All That Street)	"Uptown Funk" + "TWINNEM (Remix)" + "Cool Off"	Mark Ronson (feat. Bruno Mars) + Coi Leray (feat. DaBaby) + Missy Elliott	FAIL
?	Song A Yoon (Brand New Child)	"Uptown Funk" + "TWINNEM (Remix)" + "Cool Off"	Mark Ronson (feat. Bruno Mars) + Coi Leray (feat. DaBaby) + Missy Elliott	FAIL
?	Lee Ga Hyun (All That Street)	"Uptown Funk" + "TWINNEM (Remix)" + "Cool Off"	Mark Ronson (feat. Bruno Mars) + Coi Leray (feat. DaBaby) + Missy Elliott	JOIN
?	Lim Gyu Bin (Brand New Child)	"Uptown Funk" + "TWINNEM (Remix)" + "Cool Off"	Mark Ronson (feat. Bruno Mars) + Coi Leray (feat. DaBaby) + Missy Elliott	FAIL
?	Lee Joo Bin (BOW)	"Uptown Funk" + "TWINNEM (Remix)" + "Cool Off"	Mark Ronson (feat. Bruno Mars) + Coi Leray (feat. DaBaby) + Missy Elliott	JOIN
?	Bae Soo Yeon (Well Boss)	"Uptown Funk" + "TWINNEM (Remix)" + "Cool Off"	Mark Ronson (feat. Bruno Mars) + Coi Leray (feat. DaBaby) + Missy Elliott	JOIN

==== Final results ====
7 people per Crew
**1MILLION**	**LACHICA**	**BEBE**	**MANNEQUEEN**	**JAM REPUBLIC**	**HOOK**
Sim Ha Neul (VENTURE)	Jeon Ho Yeon (The Queens)	Park Eun Seo (JustJerk Rookies)	Kim Soo Jung (Humble)	Yamada Ria	Ahn Ye Jin (Brand New Child)
Kwon Kyung Min (VENTURE)	Park So Yoon (The Queens)	Park Seo Yeon (JustJerk Rookies)	Bang Ji Min (Humble)	Sienna Miroforidis	Seo Chae Hyung (BOW)
Yoon In Jung (VENTURE)	Joo Hyo Rin (The Queens)	Lee Ga Young (NASA)	Hwang Ye Ji (Humble)	Koyama Miyabi (Note: She Didin't Participate in the Finals due to Leg Injury, However, she did Participate in the last Stage.)	Kim Yeon Ju (BOW)
Choi Eun Kyung	Kim Yoo Kyung (Solid)	Ko A Ra (NASA)	Kim Hee Jae (Humble)	Bella (En Beatz)	Lee Joo Bin (BOW)
Lee So Min	Lee Hyun Seo (Solid)	Lee Chae Won (NASA)	Shin Dan Bi (Two Way)	Nika (En Beatz) (Note: She Left After the Mission 1 Main: 1 vs. 1 Performance Match Up due to Family Emergency.)	Song Da Bin (Well Boss)
Ok Eun Bin (Nataraja V)	Cho Hye Jin (Solid)	Yoo Seung Ju (CHARM)	Lee Na Ra (M.S.G.)	Kim Min Jung (NO LIP) (Note: She Left After the Interim Mission: Kpop Mission due to Shoulder Injury.)	Bae Soo Yeon (Well Boss)
Lee Ji Sol (Nataraja V)	Eom Se Jung (Solid)	Sato Rana	Kim Hye Rin (M.S.G.)	Park Eun Woo (NO LIP)	Lee Ga Hyun (All That Street)

=== Mission 1 Interim Mission: Kpop Mission ===
Rules for the Kpop Choreography Self-Production
- Within 24 hours of the Masters announcing the Interim mission, each Team will work amongst themselves to create a performance. They can choose any Kpop song and the performance should be 1 minute and 30 seconds.
- All 6 teams will take turns and perform their choreography for 1 minute and 30 seconds onstage. The team that goes first will choose the next team to perform.
- The Masters are watching the performances in a separate room.
- For the evaluation, the contestants will be evaluating each other. Each team will rank all 6 teams, including themselves, from the 1st to 6th places. The teams will receive points based on their rankings, which will decide their final scores.
- The team that comes in first will receive a special benefit. It is revealed that the team in 1st place can pick an artist to work with and their opponent first.

Performance List
Crew	Song	Original Artist	Results
JAM REPUBLIC	"Ddu-Du Ddu-Du"	Blackpink	2nd
BEBE	"Thunderous"	Stray Kids	1st
1MILLION	"Lupin"	Kara	3rd
HOOK	"Classroom Idea"	Seo Taiji and Boys	5th
LACHICA	Oh!	Girls' Generation	6th
MANNEQUEEN	Boomerang	Wanna One	4th

=== Mission 1 Main: 1 vs. 1 Performance Match Up ===
Rules for the 1 vs. 1 Mission
- The top 3 Crew Teams from the Kpop Choreography Mission can pick a Global Kpop Artist and an opponent.
- There will be Three-Parts, The First and Second Part will be decided by both Teams on who will take which part. The Last Part is a Joint Part where both Teams perform together.
- All Teams will record their performance with masks for anonymity and fair voting.
- The 3 Master's Crew Team with the Highest Overall Performance Score will be saved to the Next Round
- The 3 Master's Crew Team with the Lowest Overall Performance Score will go to the elimination battle (Similar to Street Woman Fighter)

Performance List (Bold Crew is the Choreography Chosen for the Joint Part)
Round	Crews	Song	Global Kpop Artists	First Part	Second Part	Additional Joint Choreography Score	Online Public Evaluation	Combined Score	Results
Round 1	**BEBE**	"Pink Venom" + "Ice Cream"	Blackpink (feat. Selena Gomez)		**BEBE**	100	810	910	**BEBE WIN**
Round 1	**MANNEQUEEN**	"Pink Venom" + "Ice Cream"	Blackpink (feat. Selena Gomez)	MANNEQUEEN					
630	630	LOSE							
Round 2	**JAM REPUBLIC**	"Seven" + "Chicken Noodle Soup"	BTS (Jungkook + J-Hope)		**JAM REPUBLIC** (Note: Note: Member Kim Min-jung is unable to continue due to a shoulder injury, Thus they continued as a 6-member Crew.)	100	720	820	**JAM REPUBLIC WIN**
Round 2	**HOOK**	"Seven" + "Chicken Noodle Soup"	BTS (Jungkook + J-Hope)	HOOK					
450	450	LOSE							
Round 3	**1MILLION**	"Super" + "Left & Right" + "Go Back"	Seventeen + "4Tuinz"	**1MILLION**		100	900	1000	**1MILLION WIN**
Round 3	**LACHICA**	"Super" + "Left & Right" + "Go Back"	Seventeen + "4Tuinz"		LACHICA				
540	540	LOSE							

Rules of the Elimination Battle
- Best of 5:
  - Round 1 – Crew
  - Round 2 – Ace
  - Round 3 – Duet
  - Round 4 – Leader
- At the end of each round, the Audience (composed only of Dancers) will determine the winner.
- The first crew to win three rounds is safe from elimination, while the losing crew is eliminated.

First Elimination Battle
Round	Contestant		Winning team
Round	HOOK	LACHICA	Winning team
1	Crew	Crew	**HOOK**
2	Lee Ga Hyun	Jeon Ho Yeon	**HOOK**
3	Song Da Bin and Ahn Ye Jin	Lee Hyun Seo and Kim Yoo Kyung	**LACHICA**
4	Seo Chae Hyung	Park So Yoon	**HOOK**

=== Mission 2: Girl Group Choreography Mission ===
Rules for the K-pop Choreography Mission
- Round 1: Ace Battle - The Ace dancers of each Team will give a joint performance of a girl group's song.
- Round 2: Group Match - The Teams will each pick a girl group's song to give a performance.
- The score from Round 1 will be added to the score of Round 2
- At the end of each round, the Audience (composed only of Dancers) will determine the winner.
- Out of the 5 Crews, the Team with the lowest score at the end will be instantly eliminated.
- The team that comes in first for Round 1 will receive a special benefit. It is revealed they can decide the order of Round 2.

Round 1 : Ace Battle
Crew Team	Contestant	Song selection	Points	Results
**1Million**	Yoon In Jung	Money by Lisa	70	2nd
**Bebe**	Lee Ga Young	Money by Lisa	25	4th
**MANNEQUEEN**	Lee Na Ra	Money by Lisa	**99**	**1st**
**JAM REPUBLIC**	Koyama Miyabi	Money by Lisa	32	3rd
**HOOK**	Lee Joo Bin	Money by Lisa	5	5th

Round 2 : Group Match
Crew Team	Contestant	Song selection	Points	Results
**HOOK**	Crew	I Am by Ive	194	3rd
**JAM REPUBLIC**	Crew (Note: Note: Member Nika Left the Group due to a family emergency, thus the group continued as a 5 member crew.)	Unforgiven by Le Sserafim	197	2nd
**MANNEQUEEN**	Crew	My Bag by (G)I-dle	115	5th
**1MILLION**	Crew	Monster by Red Velvet – Irene & Seulgi	**204**	**1st**
**BEBE**	Crew	Illusion by Aespa	131	4th

Final ScoreBoard
Crew Team	Round 1	Round 2	Total Points	Results
**1MILLION**	70	204	274	1st
**JAM REPUBLIC**	32	197	229	2nd
**MANNEQUEEN**	99	115	214	3rd
**HOOK**	5	194	199	4th
**BEBE**	25	131	156	5th

=== Mission 3 : Final Mission ===
==== Part 1 : Street Dance Girls Fighter with Masters ====
Each crew will create a performance with their Master. For this mission, not just the masters will join the performance. Other dancers from Street Woman Fighter 2 will also join the performance.

SDGF2 with Masters
Crew	Song + Artist
1MILLION (Note: 1 member had a knee injury and had to have surgery so they are now 6 members.)	Runaway Baby By Bruno Mars
HOOK	"Beggin'" By Måneskin
JAM REPUBLIC (Note: Miyabi didn't participate due to an ACL Injury, Emma From JamRepublic Participate in this Performance)	"Move" By Beyoncé
MANNEQUEEN	"Blessed" By BRLLNT

==== Part 2 : World Class Teenager ====
During this mission, the teenage dancers must prove that they are world-class dancers. They must complete a performance while showcasing the unique identity of their own crew.

SDGF2 without Masters
Crew	Song + Artist
1MILLION	"Lacrimosa" by Apashe
HOOK	"MINJOKYO (ENTRANCE)" by Lim Kim + "Finder" by "Nuol"
JAM REPUBLIC (Note: Although Injured, Miyabi Still Participate in the Second Part of the performance)	See You Again by Charlie Puth + Got What You Need by Eve + Vulgar by Madonna, Sam Smith
MANNEQUEEN	"29h" by "Fraicheursd" + "Isis (Clean)" by Joyner Lucas

Final Scoreboard
Crew	MNET Votes	Live Broadcast Votes	Total
1MILLION	3,169	6,930	10,099
HOOK	1,628	7,347	8,975
JAM REPUBLIC	14,108	11,872	25,980
MANNEQUEEN	1,931	4,889	6,820

== Final ranking ==
Crews' final rankings
Rank	Crew	Notes
1st place, gold medalist(s)	Team JAM REPUBLIC	Winner
2	Team 1MILLION	Runner-up
3	Team HOOK	3rd place
4	Team MANNEQUEEN	4th Place
5	Team BEBE	Eliminated in Episode 5
6	Team LACHICA	Eliminated in Episode 4
