= Street Dance Girls Fighter =

South Korean dance survival show

- Hangul: 스트릿댄스 걸스 파이터
- RR: Seuteurit daenseu geolseu paiteo
- MR: Sŭt'ŭrit taensŭ kŏlsŭ p'ait'ŏ
- Genre: Reality competition
- Presented by: Kang Daniel
- Country of origin: South Korea
- Original language: Korean
- No. of episodes: 6

Production
- Production companies: CJ ENM; LUYWORKS Media

Original release
- Network: Mnet
- Release: November 30, 2021 – January 4, 2022

Related
- Street Woman Fighter; Street Man Fighter; Be Mbitious; Be the SMF; Anybody Can Dance; Street Dance Girls Fighter 2

Street Dance Girls Fighter (Korean: 스트릿댄스 걸스 파이터) is a spin-off of South Korean dance survival program Street Woman Fighter that premiered on Mnet on November 30, 2021 and aired every Tuesday at 22:20 KST. Female dance crews composed of high school-aged girls compete to become the top teenage dance crew. The winning crew receives a ₩10,000,000 scholarship, an opportunity to serve as an advertising model for financial services for teens, and the Street Dance Girls Fighter Trophy.

A second season was announced on September 4, 2023. The dance crews of Street Woman Fighter 2 serve as the judges/mentors for this season. The program premiered in November 2023.

== Cast ==
The program is presented by Kang Daniel and the teenage dance crews are led by Crew Masters consisting of the participating dance crews and contestants from Street Woman Fighter.

Crew	Crew Masters
HolyBang	**Honey J**, Jane, Taro/Eevee
CocaNButter	**Rihey**, Gaga, ZSun/Bicki
LACHICA	**Gabee**, Rian, Peanut/Simeez
HOOK	**Aiki**, Rageon, Odd
YGX	**Leejung**, Yeojin, Jihyo/Isak/Yell
PROWDMON	**Monika**, Lip J, Kame
WANT	**Hyojin Choi**, Moana
WAYB	**Noze**, Ansso, Dolla

*Bold - Leader

*[name]/[name] - both of these masters were present for their teams interchangeably

=== K-Pop Choreography Mission (Episode 5) ===
- Hwang Sanghoon (SM Performance Director; Representative for Aespa)
- Monsta X (Hyungwon, Joohoney, I.M)
- NCT (Taeyong, Mark)
- Kwon Twins (YGX Dancers; Representative for Mino)
- Itzy (Ryujin, Chaeryeong)
- iKon

=== Final Mission (Episode 6) ===
- Itzy (Ryujin, Chaeryeong)
- Mamamoo (Solar, Moonbyul)
- Kwon Eun-bi
- Lee Dae-hwi (AB6IX)
- Baek Ji-heon (fromis 9)

== Missions ==
=== Mission 1: Entry Test ===
Rules for the Entry Test
- Each crew dances in front of the Crew Masters.
- During the last 10 seconds of each performance, the Crew Masters must click their IN Button if they think the crew matches their standards.
- If a crew gains at least 4 IN buttons, they will pass the entry test. If they have approval from all the crews, they will receive an "ALL IN"
- Crews are given the chance to join the teams of Crew Masters that voted them IN, and be mentored by the Crew Masters.
- If a crew receives less than 4 IN buttons, they will be eliminated on the spot.

Performance List (The board of the crews correspond to the representative colours of the Crew Masters they joined; black boards signify eliminated crews.)
Crew	Members	Song	Original Artist
The Queens (Note: The Queens have previously received a Grand Prize from the China Teen Top Dance Competition, Poland International Dance Contest and the World Dance Festival.)	8	"Fireball" + "Spicy"	Willow (Feat. Nicki Minaj) + CL
BLING GIRLZ (Note: BLING GIRLZ have previously gone viral for their choreography video on YouTube.)	7	Original Diss Rap (Note: From Unpretty Rapstar Season 1.) + "Get Busy" + "Turn Down For What"	Jessi + Sean Paul + DJ Snake & Lil Jon
NYX (Note: NYX and H originate from Busan and are considered rivals.)	6	"NILIRIA" (Missy Elliott Ver.) + "GO"	G-Dragon
H	4	"Like This"	Mims
NEWNION (Note: Member Kim Soo-hyun, known as "SIMMON", is a well-known YouTube and TikTok personality.)	5	"Lose Control"	Missy Elliott (Feat. Ciara & Fatman Scoop)
Vigilante (Note: Vigilante leader Kim Chaejung & Pulse member Jung Jisu were once students of Coca N Butter's Rihey.)	3	"Money"	Lisa
Pulse	2	"God Is A Woman" + "Ice Cream Cake"	Ariana Grande + Red Velvet
KLWC (Note: Member Ahn Jimin and Chitty City's Lee Jisun battled in the waiting area before their auditions.) (Note: Member Ahn Jimin once received the MVP award from Prowdmon's Lip J in a competition. She also competed in "Holiday Waacking Competition" where LACHICA's Peanut served as a judge.)	5	"Toreador Song" + "Samba De Janeiro" / "One Night Only" (Disco Ver.) (Note: Freestyle performance requested by Crew Masters, the song being previously used on Street Woman Fighter's Underdog Fight between PROWDMON's Lip J and LACHICA's Peanut.)	Georges Bizet + Bellini / Beyonce, Sharon Leal & Anika Noni Rose
Phoenix (Note: Member Cho Soo-ah is a trainee under Highline Entertainment, and has appeared in Wonho's "Blue" MV.)	5	"React"	The Pussycat Dolls
FLOOR	6	"Blessed" (Note: Before their performance, Coca N Butter asked them to do basic dancehall moves (he Willy Bounce and Gwara Gwara).)	Shenseea & Tyga
Interline	9	"My Life is Going On" (Note: Based on Netflix drama series "Money Heist")	Burak Yeter & Cecilia Krull
KOMAI	6	"Sal-Ki"	Lim Kim
Teeth Correction	3	"Born To Be Alive"	Patrick Hernandez
LDA	9	"Funkin' Like My Father"	Brian Culbertson
Mis Molly (Note: Mis Molly and ANF originate from Gwangju and are considered rivals.)	7 (Note: Member Song Yoonji injured her leg before the performance, which caused the group to consider performing as 6. However, she was well enough to continue.)	"How People Move" (사람들이 움직이는 게)	AKMU
ANF	11	"My Struggles" + "Lose Control"	Missy Elliott (Feat. Mary J. Blige & Grand Puba) + Missy Elliott (Feat. Ciara & Fatman Scoop)
TURNS (Note: Member Cho Nain has been a member of "JustJerk Family" for 2.5 years, and has also been a backup dancer for CL's "Tie a Cherry (alongside AMAZON's Park Hyerim) and Wheein's "Watercolor" (alongside YGX's Yeojin). She also appears as the Center in Street Woman Fighter's Mega Crew Mission (as part of YGX's Mega Crew).) (Note: Member Song Heesoo is a dancer under YGX Academy. She is also a backup dancer for Mino's "Ok Man" (alongside YGX's Yell, Yeojin & Lee Jung).) (Note: Members Cho Nain, Song Heesoo, and AMAZON's Park Hyerim often participate in YGX's Lee Jung's choreography videos on YouTube.) (Note: AMAZON's Park Hyerim, Nowon, and Yoon Injung with members Song Heesoo and Cho Nain originally applied as a single crew. However, due to management issues, they were split up and reformed into two different crews.)	5	"DNA"	Kendrick Lamar
Yeonsal (Note: Members Lee Soojung & Lee Eunmi were formerly contestants on Dancing High.)	6	"Borneo"	Wolfgang Gartner, Aero Chord
Idea (Note: All members of Idea appeared on Street Woman Fighter's Mega Crew Mission as part of PROWDMON's Mega Crew. They are all students of PROWDMON's Kayday.)	5	"Copycat" + "Move Your Body"	Billie Eilish + Sia
Brand New Child (Note: All Brand New Child members are students of PROWDMON's Ham.G. They also appeared on an orange commercial with Hook's Aiki. And three members are going to the same high school as Holy Bang's Honey J)	16 (Note: Brand New Child have the most members out of any crew)	"GOTTASADAE"	BewhY
Break Ambition	3	"They Want EFX"	Das EFX
AMAZON (Note: Member Park Hyerim, also known as HARIMU, is under 1Million Dance Studio. She is a backup dancer for CL's "Tie a Cherry" (alongside TURNS' Song Heesoo) and Jeon Somi's "XOXO" stages. She was also a contestant on CAP-TEEN.) (Note: TURNS' Cho Nain, Song Heesoo and member Park Hyerim often participate in YGX's Lee Jung's choreography videos on YouTube.) (Note: Member Park Hyerim, Nowon, and Yoon Injung with TURNS' Song Heesoo and Cho Nain originally applied as a single crew. However, due to management issues, they were split up and reformed into two different crews.)	6	"Guaya"	Eva Simons
Squid (Note: Member Lee Seoin (known as Gwacheon Honey Watermelon) is a TikTok & Instagram dance personality, who also appeared on an Instagram commercial in South Korea.)	5	"Que Calor"	Major Lazer & J Balvin (Feat. El Alfa)
Honor Inside	3	"두근두근 쿵쿵 (Palpitating Kung Kung)"	Hyun Jin-young
Tread	5	"Walk it Talk it"	Migos (Feat. Drake)
Focus	6	"Bust 'Em Up"	Crookers present Dr Gonzo
KakC	3	"Birthday"	Jeon Somi
Dillies	7	"Queendom"	AURORA
ArtB	5	"Rhtymn Ta (Rock Ver.)"	iKON
Chitty City (Note: KLWC's Ahn Jimin and Member Lee Jisun battled in the waiting area before their auditions.)	5	"1, 2 Step"	Ciara (Feat. Missy Elliott)
High Ten	5	"Mi Gente + Diva - Homecoming Live"	Beyoncé

Key

✔	Crew Masters that pressed the IN button
✘	Crew Masters that did not press the IN button
★	The Crew Masters chosen by each team
	Crew that received an ALL IN
	Crew that did not have 4 or more IN buttons (Eliminated)

Results Board
Crew	YGX	LACHICA	WANT	WAYB	CocaNButter	PROWDMON	HolyBang	HOOK
The Queens	★	✔	✔	✔	✔	✔	✘ (Note: They Originally want to press the IN Button, But however they got distracted by the performance and forgot to press it, but they did admitted is an ALL IN Performance.)	✔
BLING GIRLZ	✔	★	✔	✘	✘	✘	✘	✔
NUIX	✘	✔	✘	✔	✘	★	✘	✔
H	✔	✔	✔	✔	✔	✔	✔	★
NEWNION	✔	✔	✘	✔	✔	✔	✔	★
Vigilante	✔	✘						✔
Pulse	✘ (Note: It's unknown which Crew masters Voted IN But they did Receive Less than 4 IN thus they were eliminated on the spot.)							
KLWC	✔	★	✔	✔	✔	✔	✔	✔
Phoenix	✔	★	✔	✔	✘	✘	✔	✘
FLOOR	✔	✔	✔	✔	★	✔	✔	✔ (Note: Even though they Click IN, HOOK insist them not to join them but the team did trick them when they said they want to join "Hook N Butter" (Which in the end they Join Cocoa N Butter Eventually).)
Interline	✘							
KOMAI	✘							
Teeth Correction	✘							
LDA	✘							
Mis Molly	✔	✔	✔	✔	✔	✔	✔	★
ANF	✔	✔	✔	✔	✔	✔	★	✔
TURNS	★	✔	✔	✔	✔	✔	✔	✔
Yeonsal	✔	✔	✔	✔	✔	✔	✔	★
Idea	✔	✔	✔	✔	✘	★	✔	✔
Brand New Child	✔	✔	✔	✔	✔	★	✔	✔
Break Ambition	✔	✔	✔	✔	✔	✔	★	✘
AMAZON	✔	★	✔	✔	✔	✔	✔	✔
Squid	★	✔	✔	✔	✘	✔	✔	✔
Honor Inside	✔	✔	✔	✘	✘	★	✘	✘
Tread	✔	✘	✔	★	✔	✔	✔	✔
Focus	✔	✔	✔	✔	✘	✘	✘	★
KakC	✔ (Note: It's unknown which Crew masters Voted IN But they did Receive 4 or More IN thus they pass to the next round.)							★
Dillies	✔	★	✔					
ArtB	✔	★	✔					
Chitty City	★	✔						
High Ten	✔					★	✔	

=== Mission 2: Improvised Battle Mission ===
Rules for the Improvised Battle Mission
- Master Crews with more than 2 teenage dance crews (HOOK, LACHICA, PRODWMON & YGX) will need to organise a battle among their own crews in order to select only 2 crews to move on to the next round.
- Master Crews with 1 or 0 teenage dance crews (CocaNButter, WAYB & WANT) will fill their teams by selecting from the crews eliminated by those with more than 2 crews.
- Master Crews with only 2 teenage dance crews (HolyBang) are automatically filled and move on to the next round.
- Teenage dance crews not selected by any Master Crews are eliminated

==== Part 1 : HolyBang ====
As only two crews selected HolyBang as their mentors, the team is pre-set and does not have to advance to a selection battle.

==== Part 2 : HOOK ====
Rules for HOOK's Selection Battle
- In the first round, each crew is given 30 minutes to choreograph a routine that must incorporate the use of their own shoes as a prop.
- The crew with the best performance gets chosen to join Hook, while the two runner-up crews have to battle one another in a dance-off.
- The winner of the dance-off gets chosen to join Hook, while the rest are eliminated

First Battle (Prop Battle)
Team	Song	Original Artist	Results
KakC	"One Kiss"	Calvin Harris & Dua Lipa	FAIL
Mis Molly	"One Kiss"	Calvin Harris & Dua Lipa	JOIN
Focus	"Bout That Bubble"	Tech N9ne	FAIL
Yeonsal	"Bout That Bubble"	Tech N9ne	FAIL
H	"Bout That Bubble"	Tech N9ne	Dance Off
NEWNION	"Bout That Bubble"	Tech N9ne	Dance Off

Second Battle (Dance Off Battle)
Team	Song	Original Artist	Results
NEWNION	"They Don't Want Music"	The Black Eyed Peas	FAIL
H	"They Don't Want Music"	The Black Eyed Peas	JOIN

==== Part 3 : LACHICA ====
Rules for LACHICA's Selection Battle
- The first battle is a dance cypher battle where songs play at random and a single member of any crew is given 40 seconds to freestyle to the particular song. Only 1 member representing their crew can step out at each time and no interference by other members can occur.
- The crew with the best performance in the first battle is selected, while the two runner-up crews participate in a second battle where each crew sends out a representative to participate in a dance-off. Each representative is given 40 seconds to freestyle dance to the song played at random.
- The winner of the dance-off is selected and the remaining crews are eliminated.

First Battle (Cypher Battle)
Team	Song	Original Artist	Results
Amazon	"Milkshake"	Kelis	Dance Off
Bling Girls	"Milkshake"	Kelis	Dance Off
Phoenix	"Kiss Kiss"	Chris Brown	FAIL
Art B	"Kiss Kiss"	Chris Brown	FAIL
KLWC	"Pop"	*NSYNC	JOIN
Dillies	"Pop"	*NSYNC	FAIL

Second Battle (Dance Off Battle)
Team	Song	Original Artist	Results
Amazon	"Attention"	Todrick Hall	JOIN
Bling Girls	"Attention"	Todrick Hall	FAIL

==== Part 4 : PROWDMON ====
Rules for PROWDMON's Selection Battle
- The first battle is a dance cypher battle, where songs are played at random for 5 to 7 minutes. Each crew sends out a member to dance for as long as possible and the representative that impresses the most gets selected.
- The second battle is a 1-on-1 battle against PROWDMON's member Lip J, and the winning representative with the best performance is selected.
- The remaining crews are eliminated.

First Battle (Cypher Battle)
Team	Song	Original Artist	Results
Nyx	"We Ride (I See The Future) (DAUL Remix)" + "Hey Now (Mean Muggin)" + "$100 Dollar Bill Ya'll" + "No Man No Cry"	Mary J. Blige + Xzibit (Feat. Keri Hilson) + Ice Cube + Jimmy Sax Version	Dance Off
High Ten	"We Ride (I See The Future) (DAUL Remix)" + "Hey Now (Mean Muggin)" + "$100 Dollar Bill Ya'll" + "No Man No Cry"	Mary J. Blige + Xzibit (Feat. Keri Hilson) + Ice Cube + Jimmy Sax Version	Dance Off
Honor Inside	"We Ride (I See The Future) (DAUL Remix)" + "Hey Now (Mean Muggin)" + "$100 Dollar Bill Ya'll" + "No Man No Cry"	Mary J. Blige + Xzibit (Feat. Keri Hilson) + Ice Cube + Jimmy Sax Version	Dance Off
Idea	"We Ride (I See The Future) (DAUL Remix)" + "Hey Now (Mean Muggin)" + "$100 Dollar Bill Ya'll" + "No Man No Cry"	Mary J. Blige + Xzibit (Feat. Keri Hilson) + Ice Cube + Jimmy Sax Version	Dance Off
Brand New Child	"We Ride (I See The Future) (DAUL Remix)" + "Hey Now (Mean Muggin)" + "$100 Dollar Bill Ya'll" + "No Man No Cry"	Mary J. Blige + Xzibit (Feat. Keri Hilson) + Ice Cube + Jimmy Sax Version	JOIN

Second Battle (1-on-1 Battle)
Team	Song	Original Artist	Results
Nyx	"Kick Up Your Heels"	Jessica Mauboy	FAIL
High Ten	"Raingurl"	Yaeji	FAIL
Honor Inside	"7"	BRLLNT (Feat. DUVV)	FAIL
Idea	"Girls In The Hood"	Megan Thee Stallion	JOIN

==== Part 5 : YGX ====
Rules for YGX's Selection Battle
- The first and only battle is a freestyle battle, where songs are played at random and each representative of the crew is given 40 seconds to freestyle dance. Only 1 member representing their crew can step out at each time and no interference by other members can occur. After 40 seconds, the song changes and the next representative steps out to dance.
- The two representatives who impressed the most are selected along with their crews, and the remaining crews are eliminated.

Freestyle Battle
Team	Song	Original Artist	Results
Chitty City	"BAND"	CHANGMO, Hash Swan, ASH ISLAND & Keem Hyoeun	FAIL
The Queens	"Work It"	Missy Elliott	FAIL
Turns	"Shutterbugg" + "Stronger"	Big Boi (Feat. Cutty) + Kanye West	JOIN
Squid	"Beats To The Rhyme"	Run–D.M.C.	JOIN

==== Part 6 : CocaNButter ====
Rules for CocaNButter's Selection Battle
- Of the 13 eliminated teams, two teams are selected by CocaNButter to participate in a dance cypher battle, where songs are played at random for 5 minutes and all members of each crew must take turns to step out and dance in that time.
- The crew that impresses the most is selected to join CocaNButter.

Cypher Battle
Team	Song	Original Artist	Results
NEWNION	"No Diggity" + "Taste" + "Bashment" + "Even If" + "The Learning"	Blackstreet & Dr. Dre + Tyga (Feat. Offset) + Ape Drums + Method Man + Mobb Deep (Feat. Big Noyd)	FAIL
NYX	"No Diggity" + "Taste" + "Bashment" + "Even If" + "The Learning"	Blackstreet & Dr. Dre + Tyga (Feat. Offset) + Ape Drums + Method Man + Mobb Deep (Feat. Big Noyd)	JOIN

==== Part 7 : WAYB ====
Rules for WAYB's Selection Battle
- Of the 12 eliminated teams, 2 teams are selected by WAYB to participate in a dance-off which includes 2 rounds.
- In the first round, the leaders of each crew are given 40 seconds each to freestyle to a song played at random.
- In the second round, each crew can send out any member as a representative to freestyle to a song played at random.
- The crew that impresses the most is selected to join WAYB.

Freestyle Battle
Team	Song	Original Artist	Results
NEWNION	"Temple" + "GOTTASADAE"	Baauer (Feat. G-Dragon, M.I.A.) + BewhY	JOIN
The Queens	"Temple" + "GOTTASADAE"	Baauer (Feat. G-Dragon, M.I.A.) + BewhY	FAIL

==== Part 8 : WANT ====
Rules for WANT's Selection Battle
- Of the 11 eliminated teams, 3 teams are selected by WANT to participate in a dance-off where each crew can send out two members as a representative to freestyle to a song played.
- Each crew are given 60 seconds each to freestyle to a song played.
- The 2 crews that impresses the most are selected to join WANT.

Freestyle Battle
Team	Song	Original Artist	Results
Focus	"Oh My Gawd" + "Kokamoe Freestyle"	Mr Eazi & Major Lazer feat. Nicki Minaj & K4mo + GoldLink	FAIL
Bling Girls	"Oh My Gawd" + "Kokamoe Freestyle"	Mr Eazi & Major Lazer feat. Nicki Minaj & K4mo + GoldLink	JOIN
Yeonsal	"Oh My Gawd" + "Kokamoe Freestyle"	Mr Eazi & Major Lazer feat. Nicki Minaj & K4mo + GoldLink	JOIN

==== Final results ====
16 crews
YGX	LACHICA	WANT	WayB
TURNS	KLWC	Yeonsal	Thread
Squid	Amazon	Bling Girls	Newnion
Coca N Butter	PROWDMON	Holy Bang	HOOK
FLOOR	Brand New Child	ANF	Mis Molly
Nyx	Idea	Break Ambition	H

=== Mission 3: One Team Performance Mission ===
Rules for the One Team Performance Mission
- Before the mission the remaining 16 crews will be ranked from the best, good, middle, low.
- The master's crew team will work together to make one performance
- There will be three parts, the first and second part will be deliberately discuss on which team will do the third and last part which is the joint part where one crew choreography from each team will choose to perform all together
- They will record their performance with masks for anonymity and fair voting.
- The voting based on YouTube Likes (X 100) + YouTube Views of the video within 24 hours since the video release
- The voting will count as 70% of the overall score, the 30% of the score is based on the master's score, were the masters (not their own) will judge each team.
- The overall best voting score will receive 700 points while the overall best judges score will receive 300 points, thus the perfect score is 1000 points
- The 4 master's crew team with the highest overall performance score will be saved to the next round
- The 4 master's crew team with the lowest overall performance score will go to the elimination battle (similar to street woman fighter)

Masters Grade Ranking Board
Rank	Crew
Best	AMAZON, KLWC, NEWNION, Yeonsal & Mis Molly
Good	Nyx & H
Middle	Thread, Bling Girlz, TURNS, Brand New Child
Low	Squid, IDEA, FLOOR, ANF & Break Ambition

Performance List (Bold Crew is the Choreography Chosen for the Joint Part)
Team	Crew	Song	Original Artist	First Part	Second Part	Crew Master who give the Highest Score	Crew Master who give the Lowest Score	Crew Masters Score (30%)	YouTube Voting Score (70%)	Total Score (100%)	Results
A	WANT	"Industry Baby" + "Money"	Lil Nas X & Jack Harlow + Lisa	Bling Girls	Yeonsal	HOOK	WAYB	269	600	869	6th
B	WAYB	"Got It" + "Buzina"	Marian Hill + Pablo Vittar	NEWNION	Thread	HOOK	CocaNButter	247	580	827	7th
C	YGX	"Mirror Mirror" + "Up" (Note: Based on Netflix drama series "Squid Game")	F.HERO & MILLI (Feat. Changbin of Stray Kids) + Cardi B	TURNS	Squid	CocaNButter	PROWDMON	289	700	989	1st
D	PROWDMON	"Daisy" + "Rave de Favela"	Ashnikko + MC Lan, Major Lazer & Anitta	IDEA	Brand New Child	WANT	LACHICA	280	640	920	4th
E	Holy Bang	"So Pretty" + "Purple Hat"	Reyanna Maria + Sofi Tukker	ANF	Break Ambition	YGX	WAYB	265	660	925	3rd
F	LACHICA	"7/11" + "I Like It"	Beyoncé + Cardi B, Bad Bunny & J Balvin	Amazon	KLWC	WAYB	Holy Bang	272	620	892	5th
G	CocaNButter	"TKN" + "Red Eye"	Rosalía & Travis Scott + Justin Bieber (Feat. TroyBoi)	FLOOR	Nyx	HOOK	Holy Bang	266	560	826	8th
H	HOOK	"Jump" + "BOOM"	Major Lazer (Feat. Busy Signal) + Tiësto & Sevenn	Mis Molly	H	WANT	PROWDMON	291	680	971	2nd

YouTube Views and Likes Breakdown
Team	Views^{1}	Rank	Likes^{1}	Rank
WANT	599,484	3rd	22,694	6th
PROWDMON	526,053	4th	34,279	4th
Holy Bang	470,061	6th	36,022	3rd
WAYB	633,952	2nd	17,408	8th
HOOK	522,076	5th	39,628	2nd
LACHICA	445,557	7th	25,228	5th
CocaNButter	402,277	8th	18,790	7th
YGX	1,170,574	1st	69,812	1st

^{1} Likes and views are counted from November 16, 2021 16:00~November 20, 2021 23:59 KST and are only counted through Mnet TV's official YouTube channel.

As the 4 lowest master's crew team, CocaNButter, WAYB, WANT, and LACHICA were chosen as candidates for elimination battle.

Rules of the elimination battle
- The first round is a crew battle and rounds 2 are 1 VS 1
- In the 1 VS 1 rounds, each side dances for 40 seconds separately then 40 seconds together
- At the end, the master's crew team determine the winner

First Elimination Battle
Crew Team	Round	Contestant		Winning team
CocaNButter	1	Nyx	FLOOR	FLOOR
CocaNButter	2	Kwon Jea-eun	Lim Jung-eun	FLOOR
WAYB	1	NEWNION	Thread	NEWNION
WAYB	2	Lim Ji-won	Kim Min-ju	NEWNION
WAYB	Extra	Kim Min-ji	Choi Han-bi	NEWNION
WANT	1	Bling Girls	Yeonsal	Bling Girls
WANT	2	Kim Yu-jin	Lee Su-jeong	Bling Girls
LACHICA	1	Amazon	KLWC	KLWC
LACHICA	2	Park Hye-rim	Lee Chae-rin	KLWC
LACHICA	Extra	Son Hye-yeon & Yoon In-jeong	Kim Da-Eun & Kim Hae-rin	KLWC

=== Mission 4: K-pop Choreography Mission ===
Rules for the K-pop Choreography Mission
- Each Crew Will Make a Choreography for a K-Pop B-Side Song
- The Winning Crew Team Will Choose Which Crew They Want To Battle With (However they cannot choose the crew from the same team)
- If there are Two Crews in Each Team (YGX, HOOK, HolyBang & PROWDMON). The One Crew Team (LACHICA, WayB, WANT & Coca N Butter) Will Choose Which Crew is the Overall Best.
- There Will Be Two Verse of the song, Each Verse Will Be Performed by Either Crew.
- There will be a Switch Part, Similar to Street Woman Fighter they must teach the Switch Part to Each Group they Competing
- The Winning Team Will Be Chosen by The Rest of the Crew (Not the Crew They in) and a Special Guest, They Will Choose which crew who performed the best
- The Crew Who Receive 4 or More Choose will be Passed to the Finale.
- The Other Crew Who Receive 3 or Less Will Be Eliminated.

Performance List (The Crew Colored by their Crew Team Color)
Crew (1st Verse)	Votes	Results	Song & Original Artist	Results	Votes	Crew (2nd Verse)
Brand New Child	5/7 (71.4%)	PASS	"ICONIC" by aespa	FAIL	2/7 (28.6%)	Bling Girls
Break Ambition	0/7 (0%)	FAIL	"Autobahn" by Monsta X	PASS	7/7 (100%)	NEWNION
FLOOR	6/7 (85.7%)	PASS	"MAD DOG" By NCT 127	FAIL	1/7 (14.3%)	H
IDEA	2/7 (28.6%)	FAIL	"Rocket" By Mino	PASS	5/7 (71.4%)	Mis Molly
ANF	2/7 (28.6%)	FAIL	"#TWENTY" By Itzy	PASS	5/7 (71.4%)	TURNS
Squid	1/7 (14.3%)	FAIL	"At Ease" by iKON	PASS	6/7 (85.7%)	KLWC

Results Board
Team	Special Guest	YGX	LACHICA	WANT	WAYB	CocaNButter	PROWDMON	HolyBang	HOOK
aespa	Bling Girls	Brand New Child	Brand New Child		Brand New Child	Bling Girls		Brand New Child	Brand New Child
Monsta X	NEWNION	NEWNION	NEWNION	NEWNION		NEWNION	NEWNION		NEWNION
NCT 127	FLOOR	FLOOR	FLOOR	FLOOR	FLOOR		FLOOR	H	
Mino	IDEA	Mis Molly	Mis Molly	IDEA	Mis Molly	Mis Molly		Mis Molly	
Itzy	TURNS		ANF	TURNS	TURNS	TURNS	ANF		TURNS
iKON	KLWC			KLWC	KLWC	KLWC	Squid	KLWC	KLWC

=== Mission 5 : Final Mission ===
==== Part 1 : Dance Challenge Mission ====
Each crew will create a performance and recorded their Key moves on TikTok as a Dance Challenge, the more people do the Challenge, the more Score they earned.

Crew Master Inspiration Mission
Crew	Dance Challenge Score
TURNS	300
NEWNION	280
KLWC	260
Mis Molly	240
Brand New Child	220
FLOOR	200

==== Part 2 : Performance Song Mission ====
Two crews will team up with an artist and create a performance for their song.

Original Track Mission
Crew	Song + Artist	Average Masters Score
NEWNION	"Weapon" By ITZY (Prod. Czaer)	272
FLOOR	"Weapon" By ITZY (Prod. Czaer)	260
Brand New Child	"Fire" By Jeon Soyeon ((G)-idle)	255
KLWC	"Fire" By Jeon Soyeon ((G)-idle)	266
Mis Molly	"Bada Boom" By Solar & Moonbyul (MAMAMOO)	264
TURNS	"Bada Boom" By Solar & Moonbyul (MAMAMOO)	278

==== Part 3 : One Team Performance Mission ====
Each crew will create a performance that shows their true self and teamwork skill as one team.

One Team Performance Mission
Crew	Song + Artist	Average Masters Score
NEWNION	"MAGO" By Lim Kim + "I'm Sick" By Balming Tiger	273
FLOOR	"Diggy Dee" By Charly Black & Sak Noel	264
Brand New Child	"Fighting Spirit" (투혼) By World Music Group	280
KLWC	Hairspray OST Medley ("(The Legend of) Miss Baltimore Crabs" By Michelle Pfeiffer + "The Nicest Kids in Town" By James Marsden)	267
Mis Molly	"Beethoven Virus" By Diana Boncheva	284
TURNS	"You Should See Me in a Crown" By Billie Eilish	289

Final scores
Crew	Dance Challenge Mission	Average Masters Score	Live Voting Score	Final score
NEWNION	280	273	360	913
FLOOR	200	262	320	782
Brand New Child	220	268	340	828
KLWC	260	267	300	827
Mis Molly	240	274	380	894
TURNS	300	284	400	984

== Final ranking ==
Final Rankings
Rank	Crew	Notes
1	TURNS	Champion
2	NEWNION	Runner-up
3	Mis Molly	3rd Place
4	Brand New Child	4th Place
5	KLWC	5th Place
6	FLOOR	6th Place
7-12	Bling Girls	Eliminated in Episode 5
7-12	Break Ambition	Eliminated in Episode 5
7-12	H	Eliminated in Episode 5
7-12	IDEA	Eliminated in Episode 5
7-12	ANF	Eliminated in Episode 5
7-12	Squid	Eliminated in Episode 5
13-16	Nyx	Eliminated in Episode 4
13-16	Thread	Eliminated in Episode 4
13-16	Yeonsal	Eliminated in Episode 4
13-16	Amazon	Eliminated in Episode 4

== Viewership ==
Street Dance Girls Fighter : South Korea viewers per episode (thousands)

Season	Episode number						Average
Season	1	2	3	4	5	6	Average
1	525	600	684	610	696	725	640

Source: Audience measurement performed nationwide by Nielsen Korea.

Average TV viewership ratings
Ep.	Original broadcast date	Average audience share	
Ep.	Original broadcast date	AGB Nielsen	
Ep.	Original broadcast date	Nationwide	Seoul
1	November 30, 2021	1.925% (4th)	2.804% (3rd)
2	December 7, 2021	2.128% (3rd)	2.811% (3rd)
3	December 14, 2021	2.128% (3rd)	2.932% (2nd)
4	December 21, 2021	2.244% (2nd)	3.089% (2nd)
5	December 28, 2021	2.308% (2nd)	3.392% (2nd)
6	January 4, 2022	2.347% (3rd)	3.066% (3rd)
Average		2.180%	3.016%
In the table above, the blue numbers represent the lowest ratings and the red numbers represent the highest ratings.; This show aired on a cable channel/pay TV which normally has a relatively smaller audience compared to free-to-air TV/public broadcasters (KBS, SBS, MBC and EBS).
