= Stranger Things (Joyner Lucas and Chris Brown song) =

2018 single by Joyner Lucas and Chris Brown

Single by Joyner Lucas and Chris Brown
- Released: February 25, 2018
- Genre: Hip hop; gangsta rap
- Length: 3:40
- Label: Atlantic
- Songwriters: Gary Lucas, Jr.; Chris Brown
- Producers: Jordon Manswell; Ye Ali

Joyner Lucas singles chronology
"Wrote My Way Out (Remix)" (2018)	"Stranger Things" (2018)	"Frozen" (2018)

Chris Brown singles chronology
"Love You Better" (2018)	"Stranger Things" (2018)	"Freaky Friday" (2018)

Music video
- "Stranger Things" on YouTube

"Stranger Things" is a song by American rapper Joyner Lucas and American singer Chris Brown, released on February 25, 2018. The song was supposed to be the lead single from their upcoming collaborative mixtape Angels and Demons, but the project was never released.

== Background and composition ==
On January 2, 2018, Brown posted a snippet of the song, saying that it was gonna feature Lucas and Ski Mask the Slump God. Later that month, Joyner Lucas revealed that he was recording music with Chris Brown on Twitter. "Stranger Things" was released on February 25, 2018.

The song is named after the TV series of the same name, and its production is based on a sample of its theme song. "Stranger Things" doesn't feature any chorus. Brown and Lucas alternate rap verses throughout the track, having various flow changes, with both voices coming together during the last part of the song.

== Music video ==
The videoclip for the song was shot on January 22, 2018, and directed by Lucas himself along with Ben Proulx. The clip was released the same day of the song. During the music video Brown and Lucas are having a party in the back of a van in the streets of the suburbs of Los Angeles, until, due to the excessive noise, two policemen arrive, and, in a comical skit, one of the two recognizes Brown, understands the situation, and decides to not do anything.

In the videoclip Chris Brown wears his Heartbreak on a Full Moon chain, representing the album cover of his eighth studio album, released few months before "Stranger Things", depicting a bleeding heart over an "iced-out" moon.

== Charts ==
Chart (2018)	Peak position
Australia (ARIA)	100
Canada Hot 100 (Billboard)	75
US Billboard Hot 100	91
US Hot R&B/Hip-Hop Songs (Billboard)	46

== Certifications ==
Certifications for "Stranger Things"
Region	Certification	Certified units/sales
New Zealand (RMNZ)	Platinum	30,000^{‡}
United States (RIAA)	Gold	500,000^{‡}
^{‡} Sales+streaming figures based on certification alone.
