= Your Heart =

2021 single by Joyner Lucas and J. Cole

Single by Joyner Lucas and J. Cole
- Released: September 24, 2021
- Length: 3:18
- Label: Twenty Nine
- Songwriters: Gary Lucas, Jr.; Jermaine Cole
- Producers: Palaze; LC; Hagan

Joyner Lucas singles chronology
"Dreams Unfold" (2021)	"Your Heart" (2021)	"Late to the Party" (2021)

J. Cole singles chronology
"The Jackie" (2021)	"Your Heart" (2021)	"Poke It Out" (2021)

Music video
- "Your Heart" on YouTube

"Your Heart" is a song by American rappers Joyner Lucas and J. Cole, released on September 24, 2021 with an accompanying music video. It was produced by Palaze, LC, and Hagan. The song sees Lucas and Cole expressing regret for breaking their respective partners' hearts by being unfaithful and causing their relationships to end.

== Lyrics ==
In the song, Lucas admits to infidelity in a past relationship, criticizing himself ("I broke your heart, huh? / You knew I was a fuck nigga from the start, huh? / You should've listened when they said I was a dawg, huh? / You should've listened to your head when you had thoughts, huh?"). In his verse, J. Cole also admits to cheating on his partner and blames himself for losing her to someone else ("I hate a fuck nigga, used to be a fuck nigga / Couldn't even blame her if she did fuck niggas").

== Charts ==
Chart (2021)	Peak position
Australia (ARIA)	72
Canada Hot 100 (Billboard)	34
Global 200 (Billboard)	42
Ireland (IRMA)	56
New Zealand Hot Singles (RMNZ)	3
UK Singles (Official Charts)	78
US Billboard Hot 100	32
US Hot R&B/Hip-Hop Songs (Billboard)	10
US Rhythmic Airplay (Billboard)	29
US Rolling Stone Top 100	18

== Certifications ==
Region	Certification	Certified units/sales
United States (RIAA)	Platinum	1,000,000^{‡}
^{‡} Sales+streaming figures based on certification alone.
