= BRLLNT =

South Korean DJ and producer

- Born: Lee Sang-hyeon; February 4, 1995 (age 31)
- Origin: South Korea
- Genres: Hip-hop; R&B; house
- Occupations: DJ; Producer
- Years active: 2014-present

Korean name
- Hangul: 이상현
- RR: I Sanghyeon
- MR: I Sanghyŏn

Lee Sang-hyeon better known by his stage name BRLLNT is a Grammy Award nominated DJ/Producer from South Korea born in 1995.

== Discography ==
He released his first EP titled "Girl" in 2017 with featuring from Changmo, Sumin, Paul Blanco and DUVV.

He co-produced with Anderson .Paak and Dumbfoundead in 2018 the song "Like I Do" by American singer Christina Aguilera from her eighth studio album Liberation. The single featuring GoldLink received a Grammy Award nomination for Best Rap/Sung Performance at the 61st Annual Grammy Awards, held in 2019.

On June 24, 2018, he produced “IndiGO”, the title track of the compilation album "IM" by the Korean rapper affiliated with Indigo Music, including Justhis, Kid Milli, Noel (rapper), and Yang Hong-won (formerly known as Young B). The song won Hip Hop Track of the Year and Collaboration of the Year at the 2019 Korea Hip Hop Awards.

In 2019 he produced the song "돈 Call Me" ("Don Call Me". In Korean 돈/Don means Money) for the Korean Rapper Yumdda which was Yumdda's first Chart Ranking song. This song was nominated at the Korean Music Awards for Best Hip Hop Song and the Korea Hip-Hop Awards for Hip Hop Track of the year.

Due to his tie with Soap Seoul holding his regular party called TERRITORY, he released a track titled "Cash" featuring Paul Blanco in 2020 on their newly launched Soap Records label.

On June 15, 2022, he producered Paul Blanco's single "Summer" featuring BE'O. It was selected as part of best K-pop song of 2022 by Billboard

== Awards and nominations ==
Year	Award	Category	Nominated work	Result	Ref.
2019	GRAMMY Awards	Best Rap/Sung Performance	Christina Aguilera – "Like I Do" feat. GoldLink prod. by BRLLNT, Anderson .Paak, Dumbfoundead	Nominated	
2019	Korean Hip-hop Awards	Hip Hop Track of the Year	JUSTHIS, Kid Milli, NO:EL, Young B – "IndiGO" prod. by BRLLNT	Won	
2019	Korean Hip-hop Awards	Collaboration of the Year	JUSTHIS, Kid Milli, NO:EL, Young B – "IndiGO" prod. by BRLLNT	Won	
2020	Korean Hip-hop Awards	Hip Hop Track of the Year	Yumdda – "Don't Call Me" prod. by BRLLNT	Nominated	
2020	Korean Music Awards	Best Hip Hop Song	Yumdda – "Don't Call Me" prod. by BRLLNT	Nominated	

== Accident ==
In October 2023, he was involved in a serious motorcycle accident that resulted in fractures to his cervical and thoracic vertebrae, leaving him paralyzed below the chest and temporarily unable to recall the incident or the remainder of that evening.

On April 27, 2024, he publicly addressed the accident for the first time through a message posted on Instagram. In the post, he stated that his life had changed drastically overnight and that he initially struggled to adapt to his new physical condition. Through ongoing rehabilitation, he gradually adjusted and was able to resume working on music from his hospital room. He reassured fans that he was in stable condition and that there was no need for concern. He confirmed that he retained full use of his hands and would continue producing music, although he noted that his DJ activities would likely be less frequent due to long-term wheelchair use.

As of 2026, he remained musically active, regularly sharing edits and remixes on his personal SoundCloud and Bandcamp pages, as well as continuing to produce for other artists.

On May 14, 2025, following a collaboration event with Soap Seoul, he shared a post thanking for the support he received on the project “BRLLNT is Back with SOAP” and revealed that ₩3,000,000 (approximately US$2,200) from the event's proceeds had been donated to the Korea Foundation for Persons with Disabilities.
