= Ramen & OJ =

2021 single by Joyner Lucas and Lil Baby

Single by Joyner Lucas and Lil Baby
- Released: April 30, 2021
- Length: 3:38
- Label: Twenty Nine
- Songwriters: Gary Lucas, Jr.; Dominique Jones
- Producers: Tom French; Glazer

Joyner Lucas singles chronology
"Snitch" (2020)	"Ramen & OJ" (2021)	"Dreams Unfold" (2021)

Lil Baby singles chronology
"Real as It Gets" (2021)	"Ramen & OJ" (2021)	"Every Chance I Get" (2021)

Music video
- "Ramen & OJ" on YouTube

"Ramen & OJ" is a song written and performed by American rappers Joyner Lucas and Lil Baby, released on April 30, 2021, through Twenty Nine Music Group. It was produced by Tom French and Glazer, and it was mixed and mastered by Narek Ambar.

== Background ==
In an interview with Billboard, Lucas said that he became interested in collaborating with Lil Baby after hearing his song "Drip Too Hard". "Ramen & OJ" was created via music-making app Tully, which Lucas co-founded with manager and technology entrepreneur Dhruv Joshi, who stated, "Joyner's creativity and collaboration with Lil Baby on 'Ramen & OJ' was amazing to watch because he was free to concentrate on what matters most. And I was right there with him because we built Tully to empower us to be able to succeed on our own terms."

Lucas announced the song on April 22, 2021, and released it 8 days later.

== Composition and lyrics ==
The song finds the rappers "harmonizing" about struggles of the past, newfound successes and future goals. Lucas raps about being determined to make money at all costs, and his old life in the chorus: "I can never go back to the old days, no way / Back to walkin' to work on a cold day / Back to thinkin' my ex was my soulmate / Back to tellin' myself, "We'll be okay", we'll be okay / Was survivin' off ramen and OJ / Shorty payin' the bills, I had no say". Baby's verse also deals with his own past life.

== Music video ==
A music video for the song was released. It features scenes of the rappers moving "from the house on the hill back to the trap", as well as troubles with the law and relationships, and groupies following them.

== Charts ==
Chart (2021)	Peak position
Canada Hot 100 (Billboard)	56
Ireland (IRMA)	84
New Zealand Hot Singles (RMNZ)	11
US Billboard Hot 100	67
US Hot R&B/Hip-Hop Songs (Billboard)	30

== Certifications ==
Region	Certification	Certified units/sales
New Zealand (RMNZ)	Gold	15,000^{‡}
United States (RIAA)	Platinum	1,000,000^{‡}
^{‡} Sales+streaming figures based on certification alone.
