= I Don't Die =

2018 single by Joyner Lucas and Chris Brown

Single by Joyner Lucas and Chris Brown
- Released: May 2, 2018
- Genre: Hip hop
- Length: 3:44
- Label: Atlantic
- Songwriters: Gary Lucas Jr.; Chris Brown; David Ruoff; Elias Klughammer; Rupert Thomas Jr.
- Producers: David X Eli; Sevn Thomas

Joyner Lucas singles chronology
"Frozen" (2018)	"I Don't Die" (2018)	"I Love" (2018)

Chris Brown singles chronology
"Focus (Remix)" (2018)	"I Don't Die" (2018)	"Attention" (2018)

Music video
- "I Don't Die" on YouTube

"I Don't Die" is a song by American rapper Joyner Lucas and American singer Chris Brown, released on May 2, 2018. It was planned to be the second single from their unreleased collaborative mixtape Angels and Demons. The song was produced by David X Eli and Sevn Thomas.

== Content ==
The song finds both artists rapping in rapid flows, each performing a verse. Joyner Lucas raps about working hard to succeed and his newfound fame, with a reference to the character Sub-Zero from Mortal Kombat. Chris Brown performs the chorus, on which he sings, and addresses his detractors who hope for him to fail.

== Music video ==
The music video was released alongside the single. Directed by Joyner Lucas and Ben Proulx, it depicts Lucas and Chris Brown as death row inmates who are unable to be executed by any method. They taunt the prison staff as they survive multiple execution attempts, even giving them the finger, and also enjoy a feast in a cell. Lucas is portrayed as the more measured of the pair, while Brown displays erratic behavior. They eventually escape prison, but in an ironic twist of fate, are hit by a speeding truck while running away from the guards.

== Charts ==
Chart (2018)	Peak position
US Bubbling Under Hot 100 (Billboard)	8
US Bubbling Under R&B/Hip-Hop Singles (Billboard)	5

== Certifications ==
Region	Certification	Certified units/sales
New Zealand (RMNZ)	Gold	15,000^{‡}
^{‡} Sales+streaming figures based on certification alone.
