= I'm Not Racist =

Single by Joyner Lucas
- Released: November 28, 2017
- Genre: Conscious hip hop; trip hop
- Length: 6:48
- Label: Atlantic
- Songwriters: Gary Lucas, Jr.; David Kraft; Tim Wilke; Alexander Toth
- Producers: TheBeatPlug; The Cratez

Joyner Lucas singles chronology
"Winter Blues" (2017)	"I'm Not Racist" (2017)	"Time Machine" (2017)

Music video
- "I'm Not Racist" on YouTube

Audio sample
- "I'm Not Racist": file; help

"I'm Not Racist" is a song by American hip hop recording artist Joyner Lucas, released on November 28, 2017, by Atlantic Records. It features a heated discussion about race and society from the perspective of a white man and a black man. Lucas has said that the song's lyrics represent the uncomfortable race talk that people shy away from.

== Composition ==
The track features Lucas rapping from a white man's point of view in the first verse, then rapping from a black man's point of view in the second verse, a literary device which may be influenced by Lucas's biracial origins. Both verses are supported by an airy, ambient trip hop beat.

== Music video ==
The song was first released as a music video on Lucas' YouTube channel and has since garnered over 154 million views. It was directed by Lucas and Ben Proulx.

The video starts off with a white man wearing a Make America Great Again cap from Donald Trump's presidential campaign giving his unfiltered view on the black community, synced to Lucas' first verse. He is talking to a black man in braids who sits across a table from him. The white man mentions the perceived laziness and lack of goals of the African American community, referring to black people abandoning their children and families to party and deal drugs. The white man laments that all his "hard-earned" tax payments went into supporting them, mocking the Black Lives Matter movement. He also criticizes white rapper Eminem speaking out against Trump, calling him motherfucker, and claiming "he ain't white no more"; the national anthem protests by notable black athletes; and attacks black people for idolizing rapper Tupac Shakur as compared to Albert Einstein and Steve Jobs, saying that rap music has poisoned their minds. He finishes off by blaming black people for their treatment by police, saying if they pulled up their pants, took the du-rag off and put on a suit, dropped their victim mentality, and quit blaming the white community and everyone but "[their] own race", then perhaps the police would "stop killin' you fucks". The white man claims he is "not racist" due to the fact he has connections to some black people and as he finishes his verse, he says that there are two sides to every story, and asks for the black man's view.

The black man then gives his own unfiltered point of view, synced to Lucas' second verse (Lucas does not physically appear in the video), countering the white man's stereotypes and critiquing the All Lives Matter movement as a "protest to my protest". The black man mentions police brutality in the United States and institutional racism in a country run by white people, which gave him no choice but to constantly fear for his life and deal drugs when he was blackballed from getting a decent job, and that his "grandmama" was a slave and that it still "gets to [him]". He also mentions the white community's hate for former president Barack Obama and his policies, which led to Trump's election. He then criticizes the white community for misusing black stereotypes and stealing black culture, such as fried chicken, barbecue, dance, Kool-Aid, and usage of the word "nigga" and other black slang. Regarding Tupac, the black man defends looking up to him as he carried the struggle of the black community up to his death and welcomes Eminem's freestyle against Trump as Eminem expressed his solidarity with blacks through it. The black man becomes so angry in the process that he flips the table and swats away his white counterpart's MAGA hat, telling him to stop "blaming the blacks and everyone except [his] own race" for the country's problems. At the end of his verse, the black man also claims he is "not racist" and that he wished they could trade shoes.

Following the argument, the two men embrace each other, having heard each other's point of view and desiring to reconcile despite their differences.

== Critical reception ==
The video for "I'm Not Racist" went viral within a few days of release. It has been characterized as "polarizing". Some critics have called the video necessary to spark conversation about race by tying in both extremes of the debate, while others criticized it as "clichéd" and "cheesy", and that it oversimplified the race debate by reinforcing stereotypes.

On December 7, 2018, the video was nominated for the Grammy Award for Best Music Video at the 61st Grammy Awards.

== Certifications ==
Region	Certification	Certified units/sales
United States (RIAA)	Gold	500,000^{‡}
^{‡} Sales+streaming figures based on certification alone.
