= Soap Seoul =

Music venue in Itaewon, South Korea

Soap Seoul is a music venue located in Itaewon, South Korea. The venue focuses on underground music, and invites local and overseas DJs. In 2019, they released a clothing brand and merchandising online store called 'Soap Seoul Store'. In 2020, they launched a label under the name 'Soap Records'.
