= Will (Joyner Lucas song) =

2020 single by Joyner Lucas

- Remix cover

Single by Joyner Lucas

from the album ADHD
- Released: March 25, 2020
- Genre: Hip hop
- Length: 3:21
- Label: Twenty Nine
- Songwriters: Gary Lucas, Jr.; Kevin Lingham
- Producer: Crank Lucas

Joyner Lucas singles chronology
"Lotto" (2020)	"Will" (2020)	"DOA" (2020)

Music video
- "Will" on YouTube

"Will" is a song by American rapper Joyner Lucas, and the ninth single from his debut studio album ADHD (2020). It was released on March 25, 2020 with an accompanying music video. The song is a tribute to actor and rapper Will Smith, one of Lucas's biggest influences. On May 15, 2020, a remix of the song with a guest appearance from Smith was released.

== Composition ==
In the song, Lucas raps about his great admiration for and influence from Will Smith's success throughout his career. Lucas references ten of Smith's most renowned works in his filmography, most notably The Fresh Prince of Bel-Air. Furthermore, he states that he hopes his son will one day become successful as Smith's children Willow and Jaden are, and also raps about the importance of paying homage to icons while they are still alive.

== Music video ==
The music video was directed by Joyner Lucas and Ben Proulx, and shows Lucas dressing as the iconic characters played by Will Smith in the films he mentions in the song, and parodies the movie scenes, shapeshifting from one to another. The ending of the visual features an audio clip of a quote by Will Smith.

=== Response ===
Will Smith responded on Instagram, saying that he was "humbled and honored", and that he hoped to meet Lucas one day. In April 2020, Smith hosted Lucas on his YouTube channel to thank him. Lucas called Smith his idol, and said that he grew up watching his movies and listening to his music.

== Remix ==
The official remix of the song has guest vocals from Will Smith, and was released on May 15, 2020. On his verse, Smith again thanks Lucas and discusses his inspirations as well.

== Charts ==
Chart performance of "Will"
Chart (2020)	Peak position
Australia (ARIA)	65
Canada Hot 100 (Billboard)	92
Ireland (IRMA)	72
New Zealand Hot Singles (RMNZ)	11
US Bubbling Under Hot 100 (Billboard)	2
US Hot R&B/Hip-Hop Songs (Billboard)	48
