= ADHD 2 =

Studio album by Joyner Lucas
- Released: July 18, 2025
- Recorded: 2024–2025
- Genre: Hip-hop
- Length: 57:14
- Labels: Twenty Nine; The Orchard
- Producers: A1lex Beats; ADHD Productions; Ayo; Christian King; Clay H; Freek van Workum; Garrett Raff; Gaxillic; GMP; HamdiBeats; ID Crysi; ItsNicklus; Josie Jack; Kevin Falconi; KitWheston; KXVI; Leo Son; Markmywords; MauriceMadeIt; Nox; NuxeCoward; Rysem; SadCG; Thida; Tythewifi; Young Lime; Young Taylor

Joyner Lucas chronology
Not Now, I'm Busy (2024)	ADHD 2 (2025)

Singles from ADHD 2
- 1. "One of Them" Released: June 5, 2025; 2. "White Noise" Released: June 27, 2025; 3. "Time Is Money" Released: July 11, 2025

ADHD 2 is the third studio album by American rapper Joyner Lucas and acts as a sequel to his debut album, ADHD (2020). It was released on July 18, 2025, by his self-owned label, Twenty Nine Music Group. The album features guest appearances from Ava Max, T-Pain, Blackbear, Ty Dolla Sign, Big Sean, J Balvin, DaBaby, Fireboy DML and Chris Brown. Kevin Hart and Denzel Washington both appear on skits. The Reloaded edition of the album was released on April 10, 2026 and added further guest appearances from Kodak Black, YoungBoy Never Broke Again and Lihtz.

== Background ==
On March 27, 2025 (the 5th anniversary of his debut album ADHD), Lucas announced, via Instagram, that a sequel album titled ADHD 2 was "98% done" and would be released "sooner than you think". On June 5, 2025, Lucas revealed the cover art and release date for the album, alongside the lead single.

== Singles ==
The lead single "One of Them" was released on June 5, 2025. The second single "White Noise" was released on June 27. The third single "Time Is Money", with J Balvin, DaBaby and Fireboy DML, was released on July 11.

Six other tracks from the album appeared as singles on DSPs on July 17, a day before its release. It is believed this was done as an ode to the original ADHD, having had nine official singles released prior to the album being released in March 2020.

== Track listing ==
ADHD 2 track listing
No.	Title	Writer(s)	Producer(s)	Length
1.	"Family Therapy (Skit)"	Gary Maurice Lucas Jr.	Young Taylor; Young Lime; Nuxe; Coward; Leo Son; ADHD Productions	3:23
2.	"I Wish I Knew"	Lucas	ADHD Productions; Clay H; Josie Jack; Kxvi; Leo Son	2:50
3.	"One of Them"	Lucas	HamdiBeats; Leo Son; KXVI	2:51
4.	"Tear Me Down" (featuring Ava Max)	Lucas; Amanda Koci; Kathleen Reegan	ADHD Productions; Leo Son; ID Crysi	3:58
5.	"Kevin (Skit)"	Lucas; Kevin Hart	ADHD Productions; Leo Son; Christian King	0:53
6.	"The Way That I Am"	Lucas	ADHD Productions; Leo Son; A1lex Beats	3:26
7.	"Riot"	Lucas	ADHD Productions; Leo Son; Kevin Falconi; Nox	3:44
8.	"Hate Me" (featuring T-Pain)	Lucas; Faheem Rashad Najm	ADHD Productions; Leo Son; Clay H	3:44
9.	"Denzel (Skit)"	Lucas; Denzel Washington	ADHD Productions; Leo Son	1:04
10.	"White Noise"	Lucas	Leo Son; Rysem; ADHD Productions	2:50
11.	"Butterfly Effect"	Lucas	ADHD Productions; Leo Son; Gaxillic	3:44
12.	"Anxiety Wins" (featuring Blackbear)	Lucas; Matthew Musto	ADHD Productions; Leo Son; Ayo; Tythewifi	3:25
13.	"New Sofas" (featuring Ty Dolla Sign)	Lucas; Tyrone Griffin Jr.	ADHD Productions; Leo Son; SadCG	3:31
14.	"Therapy Check Up (Skit)"	Lucas	ADHD Productions; Leo Son	1:36
15.	"Active" (featuring Big Sean)	Lucas; Sean Anderson	ADHD Productions; Leo Son; KitWheston; Kxvi; Thida	3:41
16.	"Time Is Money" (featuring J Balvin, DaBaby & Fireboy DML)	Lucas; José Balvín; Jonathan Kirk; Adedamola Adefolahan	Leo Son; ADHD Productions; GMP; Markmywords	3:18
17.	"Listen to My Demo"	Lucas	ADHD Productions; Leo Son	5:04
18.	"Momma" (featuring Chris Brown)	Lucas; Christopher Brown	ADHD Productions; Leo Son; Garrett Raff; ItsNicklus; Freek van Workum; MauriceMadeIt	4:03
Total length:				57:14

Reloaded edition track listing
No.	Title	Writer(s)	Producer(s)	Length
1.	"Family Therapy (Skit)"	Lucas	Young Taylor; Young Lime; Nuxe; Coward; Leo Son; ADHD Productions	3:23
2.	"I Wish I Knew"	Lucas	ADHD Productions; Clay H; Josie Jack; Kxvi; Leo Son	2:50
3.	"GTA 6"	Lucas	Leo Son	2:48
4.	"Tear Me Down" (featuring Ava Max)	Lucas; Koci; Reegan	ADHD Productions; Leo Son; ID Crysi	3:58
5.	"Kevin (Skit)"	Lucas; Hart	ADHD Productions; Leo Son; Christian King	0:53
6.	"The Way That I Am"	Lucas	ADHD Productions; Leo Son; A1lex Beats	3:26
7.	"One of Them"	Lucas	HamdiBeats; Leo Son; KXVI	2:51
8.	"Hate Me" (featuring T-Pain)	Lucas; Najm	ADHD Productions; Leo Son; Clay H	3:44
9.	"Time Is Money" (featuring J Balvin, DaBaby & Fireboy DML)	Lucas; Balvín; Kirk; Adefolahan	Leo Son; ADHD Productions; GMP; Markmywords	3:18
10.	"Enemies" (featuring Kodak Black)	Lucas; Bill Kahan Kapri	Leo Son; ADHD Productions; ItsNicklus; Freek van Workum	3:01
11.	"Denzel (Skit)"	Lucas; Washington	ADHD Productions; Leo Son	1:04
12.	"White Noise"	Lucas	Leo Son; Rysem; ADHD Productions	2:50
13.	"Deep End" (featuring YoungBoy Never Broke Again)	Lucas; Kentrell DeSean Gaulden	Leo Son; ADHD Productions; ALyX; Orsix; Chanté Marie; KXVI	2:47
14.	"Butterfly Effect"	Lucas	ADHD Productions; Leo Son; Gaxillic	3:44
15.	"Monsters"	Lucas; Reece Bullimore; Andrew Bullimore; Nick Gale; Matt Zara; David Saint Fleur; Eric Aukstikalnis	Digital Farm Animals; Matt Zara; Aukoustics; David Saint Fleur; Bullysongs; Reece Bullimore	3:12
16.	"New Sofas" (featuring Ty Dolla Sign)	Lucas; Griffin Jr.	ADHD Productions; Leo Son; SadCG	3:31
17.	"Letter to My Younger Self"	Lucas	Leo Son; ADHD Productions; MESIO メソ	3:25
18.	"Incognito"	Lucas	Leo Son; ADHD Productions; Ozi	3:25
19.	"Therapy Check (Skit)"	Lucas	ADHD Productions; Leo Son	1:36
20.	"Riot"	Lucas	ADHD Productions; Leo Son; Kevin Falconi; Nox	3:44
21.	"Active" (featuring Big Sean)	Lucas; Anderson	ADHD Productions; Leo Son; KitWheston; Kxvi; Thida	3:41
22.	"Set It Off" (featuring Lihtz)	Lucas; Andrew Christian Howard	TnTXD; I Project; Jay Boskie; Tahj Money	2:57
23.	"Anxiety Wins" (featuring Blackbear)	Lucas; Musto	ADHD Productions; Leo Son; Ayo; Tythewifi	3:25
24.	"Crashing Down"	Lucas	Leo Son; ADHD Productions; Young Taylor; Young Lime; Ayoley; autrioly	3:29
25.	"Momma" (featuring Chris Brown)	Lucas; Brown	ADHD Productions; Leo Son; Garrett Raff; ItsNicklus; Freek van Workum; MauriceMadeIt	4:03
26.	"Reconsider"	Lucas	Markmywords	3:37
27.	"Listen to My Demo"	Lucas	ADHD Productions; Leo Son	5:04
Total length:				85:46

== Charts ==
Chart performance for ADHD 2
Chart (2025)	Peak position
Australian Albums (ARIA)	100
Australian Hip Hop/R&B Albums (ARIA)	22
Canadian Albums (Billboard)	66
New Zealand Albums (RMNZ)	33
UK Album Downloads (Official Charts)	27
UK R&B Albums (Official Charts)	36
US Billboard 200	31
US Independent Albums (Billboard)	5
US Top R&B/Hip-Hop Albums (Billboard)	9
