= Joyner Lucas =

American rapper (born 1988)

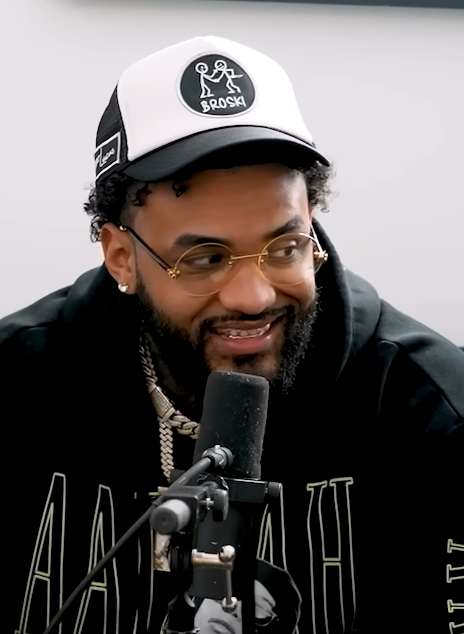
- Lucas in 2024

Background information
- Born: Gary Maurice Lucas; August 17, 1988 (age 38); Worcester, Massachusetts, U.S.
- Genres: East Coast hip-hop; conscious hip-hop
- Occupations: Rapper; songwriter; actor
- Years active: 2007–present
- Labels: Twenty Nine Music Group; Dead Silence; Atlantic
- Formerly of: Film Skool Rejekts
- Children: 2
- Website: joynerlucas.com

Gary Maurice "Joyner" Lucas Jr. (born August 17, 1988) is an American rapper. Lucas first gained exposure online with his 2015 single "Ross Capicchioni". After three self-released projects, he signed with Atlantic Records to release his fourth mixtape and major label debut, 508-507-2209 (2017). That same year, his political single, "I'm Not Racist", quickly went viral, received gold certification by the Recording Industry Association of America (RIAA), and was nominated Best Music Video at the 61st Grammy Awards. His remixes of then-popular SoundCloud rap songs, such as Lil Pump's "Gucci Gang", have also gained recognition.

His 2018 single, "Stranger Things" (with Chris Brown), marked his first entry on the Billboard Hot 100, and that same year, he guest appeared on Eminem's single "Lucky You", which peaked within the chart's top ten. He parted ways with Atlantic to self-release his debut studio album, ADHD (2020), which peaked at number ten on the Billboard 200. His second and third album, Not Now, I'm Busy (2023) and ADHD 2 (2025), both moderately entered the chart and witnessed overall critical declines.

Outside of music, Lucas co-founded the music technology platform Tully in 2015, with manager Dhruv Joshi.

== Early life and education ==
Gary Maurice Lucas Jr. was born on 17 August 1988, in Worcester, Massachusetts. He began rapping at the age of 10, and attended South High Community School in Worcester.

== Musical career ==
=== 2007–2017: Early beginnings, Along Came Joyner, 508-507-2209 and record deal ===
Joyner Lucas first started rapping under the name G-Storm, but by 2007 had changed his stage name to Future Joyner and started working with his cousin Cyrus tha Great, forming a group called Film Skool Rejekts. That year they released Workprint: The Greatest Mixtape of All Time. Lucas released his first solo mixtape, titled Listen to Me, in 2011. After rapper Future came to prominence, Lucas dropped the "Future" from his name and continued as Joyner Lucas. He released his first mixtape under this new moniker in 2013, titled LFO's (Low Frequency Oscillators). His next mixtape, Along Came Joyner, was released on April 1, 2015. This mixtape contained his critically acclaimed "Ross Capicchioni". Following the success of the song, Lucas was featured in the 2015 BET Hip-Hop Awards Cypher. Originally intended to appear in the online-only cypher, he was later promoted to rap as part of the live broadcast cyphers based on the strength of his initial performance.

Lucas signed to Atlantic Records on September 21, 2016. Lucas went on to release a project titled 508-507-2209 on June 16, 2017, with Atlantic Records. The mixtape charted at #7 on the Heatseekers Albums chart on Billboard and contained the singles "I'm Sorry", "Ultrasound", "Just Like You" and "Winter Blues". Since 2016, Lucas has also become known for remixing popular hip hop songs.

On November 28, 2017, Lucas released the single "I'm Not Racist" via his YouTube channel. The music video quickly went viral and gained critical acclaim. The controversial song is about race and society, and race relations from the perspectives of a white man and a black man. The video was nominated for the Grammy Award for Best Music Video at the 61st Grammy Awards, but lost to Childish Gambino's "This Is America". Lucas and Chris Brown announced a collaborative project titled Angels & Demons on February 25, 2018, with the project's first single "Stranger Things" releasing the following day. On April 1, 2018, Lucas released the single "Frozen", a song focused on different forms of reckless driving. The second single from the Angels and Demons collaborative mixtape, "I Don't Die", was released on May 2.

On December 24, 2018, it was announced that Lucas departed from Atlantic Records.

=== 2018–2020: ADHD and Evolution ===
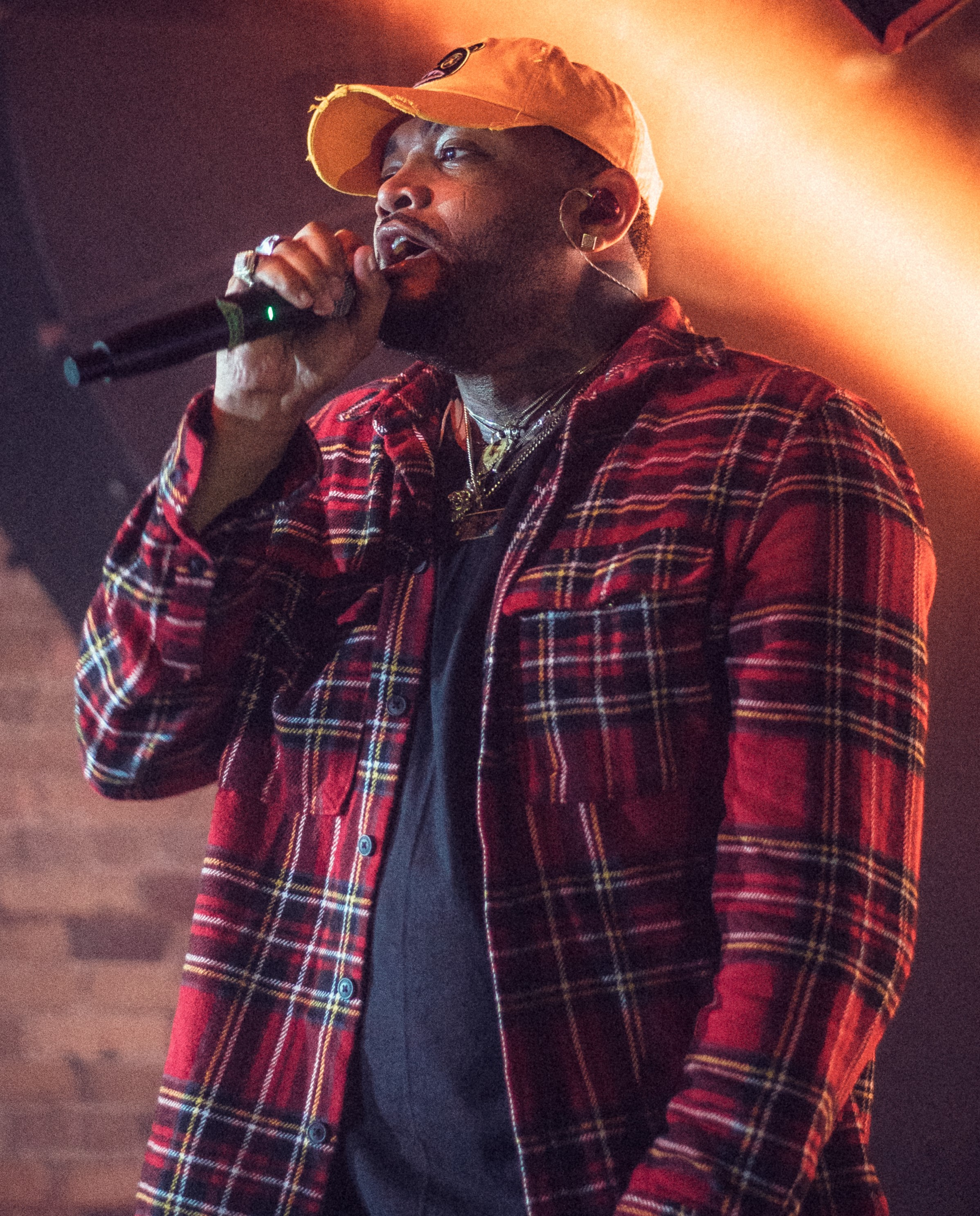
Lucas performing in 2018

On July 31, 2018, Lucas announced that he was forced to cancel appearances in the Australian and European legs of his I'm Kind of a Big Deal tour due to hoarseness and laryngitis. A month later, Lucas was featured on "Lucky You" from Eminem's tenth album, Kamikaze. The song debuted at number 6 on the Billboard Hot 100, marking Lucas' first top 10 entry on the chart. On October 12, 2018, Lucas announced that he would be releasing his debut studio album entitled ADHD. He also announced a single from the album that would be released the following Wednesday. The song, entitled "I Love", was released as the lead single from ADHD, which was released on March 27, 2020. It was preceded by nine singles from October 2018 to March 2020, the time before release. The album featured appearances from Logic, Young Thug, Chris Brown, Timbaland, Fabolous and King OSF as well as appearances from Chris Tucker and Kevin Hart who both appeared on skits.

On August 17, 2020, Lucas announced the release date of his debut EP, Evolution. It was released on October 23, 2020. It was preceded by two singles, "Fall Slowly" featuring Ashanti and "Snitch". The EP featured appearances from The Game, iyla, Ashanti, Rick Ross and Elijah James.

=== 2021–present: "Ramen & OJ", "Your Heart", The Family Plan, Not Now, I'm Busy, and ADHD 2 ===
On April 30, 2021, Lucas released the single "Ramen & OJ" with Lil Baby. It was accompanied by a music video. Lucas contributed a song titled "Shoot My Shot" to the Space Jam: A New Legacy soundtrack.

Throughout 2021, Lucas released a number of singles, most notably "Your Heart" with J. Cole, which was released on September 24, 2021, and accompanied by a music video. Lucas also collaborated with other notable rappers, including Lil Durk on the song "Rambo", released on December 3, 2021, Lil Tjay on the song "Dreams Unfold", released on August 25, 2021, and Ty Dolla $ign on the song "Late to the Party", released on October 8, 2021, and accompanied by a music video. Solo singles "Duck Duck Goose", released on October 29, 2021, and "My Escape", released on December 17, 2021, were also accompanied by music videos.

On April 1, 2022, Lucas released a tribute song to Kanye West entitled "Ye Not Crazy", similar to his earlier tribute song to Will Smith entitled "Will". However, due to the backlash of West making antisemitic remarks, Lucas removed it from streaming services months later.

On June 4, 2022, Lucas uploaded a photo to social media of him in the studio with the caption 'Working on new album....'. That was interrupted however by the announcement on October 29, 2022, that Lucas would be shooting a movie with good friend and fellow Boston native Mark Wahlberg. The film's title was later revealed to be The Family Plan, which was released by Apple TV+ on December 15, 2023. Lucas plays the role of Coogan in the movie.

On March 8, 2023, Lucas uploaded to social media, announcing that the cover art for his upcoming studio album would be released soon with a single released on March 10, 2023, called "Devil's Work 2", the sequel to the original song from his debut album ADHD. On March 9, the artwork was released, revealing the album's title to be Not Now, I'm Busy.

One month later on April 3, 2023, Lucas announced another single called "Blackout" featuring Future which was released on April 7, 2023. Both singles were accompanied by music videos. Lucas released a further five singles in 2023, those being "What's That?", released on May 9, "Cut U Off" featuring YoungBoy Never Broke Again, released on June 9, "Broski", released on June 23 and accompanied by a music video (starring Rotimi), "Seventeen", released on September 8 and "24 hours to live", released on October 27, both accompanied by music videos.

The album was to be released on August 18, 2023. However, it did not release on that date, and on November 1, 2023, Lucas announced that he was reworking it due to fan response and negative feedback on the previously released singles. On February 26, 2024, Lucas announced the album was complete, and on March 1, announced the album would be released on March 22, 2024. The album's sixth single, "Sticks & Stones" with American rapper Conway the Machine, was released the same day, accompanied by a music video. The album was pre-released by Apple Music on a single-by-single basis, which revealed that five of the original 2023 singles ("What's That?", "Cut U Off", "Broski", "Seventeen" and "24 Hours to Live") were included on the final version of the album. The album's seventh and final single, "Best for Me" with Jelly Roll, was released on March 18, 2024 with a corresponding music video. The album (Not Now, I'm Busy) was released on March 22.

Lucas announced his third studio album, ADHD 2, on March 27, 2025, the fifth anniversary of his first album ADHD. The announcement was made through Instagram. The album's first single, "One Of Them", was released on June 5. Two more singles, "White Noise", released on June 27 and accompanied by a music video, and "Time Is Money" featuring DaBaby, J Balvin and Fireboy DML, released on July 11, followed before the album was released on July 18, 2025. The album was released in the midst of a feud with Skepta.

== Artistry ==
Lucas has cited several artists as influences in his music, but he cites Eminem as his biggest musical influence. He also revealed he was influenced by Will Smith in his song "Will", which he would release a remix of featuring Will Smith himself on May 15, 2020. He also cites Jay-Z as one of his influences.

== Personal life ==
Joyner Lucas shares a son named Joyner Messiah Lucas (born February 20, 2016) with Carmen Julissa Ayala, with whom he had an off and on romantic relationship. Lucas tells the story of his son's conception in his song "Forever" on his mixtape 508-507-2209, as well as numerous other songs. Joyner Messiah has also made cameos in his father's music videos, such as the video for his 2020 single "Will".

Lucas has revealed that the title of his album ADHD comes from the fact that he was diagnosed with ADHD as a child. He explained that people surrounding him, including his own parents, made him feel like he was not normal and treated him differently as a result. Eventually, he would act out and be sent to an alternative school after expulsion.

== Feuds ==
=== Logic ===
According to Lucas, when he was on Tech N9ne's tour bus, he heard some records from Tech's album The Storm. Lucas expressed interest in collaborating with Logic on the song "Sriracha" and felt that he could add to the display of fast-flow rapping, and Tech acquiesced. Logic was originally slated to be the only feature on "Sriracha", but when he spent over six months to deliver his verse, Lucas hopped on the track to offer his own. Joyner stated that when they got the record back, he could tell that Logic was not "too happy" about him being on the track once he heard it. On his remix of Future's "Mask Off", Joyner, unhappy by the work Logic turned in after taking nearly half a year to edit his verse, directly addressed the disappointing display. Both he and Tech N9ne were upset with Logic for not emulating the style of quick flow on the song.

After Logic's hit song "1-800-273-8255" peaked at number three on the Billboard Hot 100, Joyner Lucas immediately took offense and argued that the track was named in order to bring direct competition to his song, "I'm Sorry" from his album 508-507-2209. In a later interview, he called Logic "corny" and in another incident, he said that he thinks that Logic "can rap" but feels like "he tries to prove that he's black too much for me." With both Logic's single and Lucas' mixtape dealing with the issue of mental health representation and resource allocation, Lucas was careful to not slam the track too hard.

When Logic dropped his song "Yuck" from his mixtape Bobby Tarantino II in March 2018, the veiled diss inside the song was quickly spotted by Lucas and his fans, despite Logic saying that there was no diss in the song. Seemingly nonplussed by the insult, Lucas dared Logic to call him out directly on Twitter. That same month, Joyner took aim at Logic's song "44 More" and his album Everybody on his remix of BlocBoy JB's "Look Alive".

In 2019, the two rappers ended their feud, which was revealed when Logic made a guest appearance on Joyner Lucas' song "ISIS", the third single from ADHD. Lucas kept the name of the collaborator a secret until he released the song.

=== Hopsin ===
In September 2018, when a fan asked rapper Hopsin on Twitter who would win in a rap battle between him and Joyner Lucas, Hopsin replied, "That's a dumb question that I'm sure you already know the answer to." Not long after, Lucas commented, "Hold up. @Hopsin wtf is that supposed to mean???" In his response, Hopsin stated that he would "b[r]eak his soul" and also dissed Logic in the comment. This dispute would prove to be short-lived, when in less than two days Hopsin shared a screenshot of a FaceTime call with Lucas, indicating that they finally made peace, but still wanted people to consider who would beat the other in a rap battle.

=== Tory Lanez ===
On November 19, 2018, Lanez claimed that he was a better rapper than Joyner Lucas on an Instagram Live session. Incredulous, Lucas immediately responded by inviting Lanez to a battle rapping challenge and telling him to let the public decide who is better. The next day, Lanez dropped a freestyle over Eminem's "Lucky You", of which Lucas made a guest appearance on. In less than 24 hours, Joyner responded with his freestyle over "Litty" by Meek Mill featuring Tory Lanez, also targeting rapper Trippie Redd, who joined Tory's Instagram Live and slandered Joyner's name as well. Shortly after, Lanez retaliated with his own freestyle of "Litty", titled "Litty Again", taking shots at Joyner's collaboration with Eminem. Lucas' answer song was a freestyle of Kodak Black's "Zeze". On the track, he mentions Tory's being accused of plagiarism in 2016, when listeners noticed that the ending of Lanez's song "4am Flex" was similar to Kendrick Lamar's "The Art of Peer Pressure". Joyner also accuses him of copying rapper Don Q's flow on his 2017 Funkmaster Flex freestyle. On November 23, Tory posted on Instagram a video of him declaring victory in the feud and celebrating. Displeased, Lucas reposted the video with his own comment, with a reference to Lanez as a singer.

The end of this rivalry was made public on August 8, 2019, when Joyner Lucas and Tory Lanez collaborated on their remix of "Suge" by DaBaby.

=== Skepta ===
On July 3, 2025, Skepta would take to X to announce he wanted to have a clash with an American rapper. Lucas would reply to his tweet saying "the moment i've been waiting for". This initiated a back-and-forth between the two rappers across X and Instagram. Skepta would then release "Friendly Fire", on July 11, taking digs at Lucas in the track. Lucas would reply to the diss with "say less my boy". Lucas would then release "Nobody Cares", on July 15, a full diss track against Skepta. On July 17, Skepta responded to Joyner with "Round 2". On July 25, Lucas replied with "Round 2 K.O". On July 29, Skepta released "Junior's Law".

== Awards and nominations ==
=== Grammy Awards ===
Joyner has two Grammy nominations altogether.

Year	Nominee / work	Award	Result
2019	"I'm Not Racist"	Best Music Video	Nominated
2019	"Lucky You"	Best Rap Song	Nominated

== Discography ==
Studio albums

- ADHD (2020)
- Not Now, I'm Busy (2024)
- ADHD 2 (2025)

== Filmography ==
Film
Year	Title	Role	Ref.
2023	The Family Plan	Coogan	
2024	Bad Boys: Ride or Die	Gang Leader	
