= Scott Pilgrim vs. the World (soundtrack) =

2010 soundtrack album by various artists

Scott Pilgrim vs. the World: Original Motion Picture Soundtrack

Soundtrack album by various artists
- Released: August 10, 2010
- Genres: Rock; alternative rock; indie rock; noise rock; garage rock revival; post-punk revival; soundtrack
- Length: 56:55; 65:59 (deluxe edition)
- Label: ABKCO
- Producers: Edgar Wright (exec.); Marc Platt (exec.); Nigel Godrich (exec.)

Nigel Godrich production chronology
Turn Ons (2010)	Scott Pilgrim vs. the World: Original Motion Picture Soundtrack (2010)	The King of Limbs (2011)

Scott Pilgrim vs. the World: Original Score

Film score by Nigel Godrich
- Released: August 10, 2010
- Genre: Score
- Length: 65:12
- Label: ABKCO
- Producers: Edgar Wright (exec.); Marc Platt (exec.); Nigel Godrich (exec.)

Nigel Godrich composition chronology
The Information (2006)	Scott Pilgrim vs. the World: Original Score (2010)

Two soundtrack albums were released for the motion picture Scott Pilgrim vs. the World: an original soundtrack and an original score. Co-writer, co-producer, and director Edgar Wright, co-producer Marc Platt, and music producer/composer Nigel Godrich, who also composed the original score, served as executive producers of both albums. The soundtrack includes music by Beck, Broken Social Scene, Metric, Black Lips, T. Rex, the Rolling Stones, Frank Black and Plumtree. They were released on August 10, 2010; the original score only on digital download. A 2021 re-release saw additional music by Brie Larson added to the soundtrack, and a physical version of the score.

The film follows a battle of the bands plot, with the fictional bands each based on a different real music act; production of the soundtrack began several years before the film's release. Though several of the film's actors (those in the fictional bands Sex Bob-Omb and Crash and the Boys) perform on the soundtrack, the film did not look to cast musicians, but lead actor Michael Cera could play bass guitar like his character. The actors for the fictional band the Clash at Demonhead recorded for their music, but were not included on the soundtrack album except as a bonus music video. A song performed by actor Satya Bhabha is included on the score, rather than the soundtrack.

Other songs included are mostly from Canadian and British acts, influenced by British producer and director Wright, and the Scott Pilgrim graphic novel's Canadian author Bryan Lee O'Malley. The soundtrack was released on ABKCO Records, which also allowed the team to use a song by the Rolling Stones for the film and album.

The soundtrack peaked at number 2 on the U.S. Billboard soundtrack chart, also charting in other countries. It received generally positive reviews; the original song "We Are Sex Bob-Omb" won a critics' award and was nominated for two others.

== Background and production ==
Music is an important element of the Scott Pilgrim story, with chord progressions for a song being performed by the characters first appearing on page 15 of the first graphic novel. Music producer Nigel Godrich oversaw the music for the film, which he was nervous about because of how bad bands in films usually look and sound, sentiments echoed by lead actor Michael Cera. While working on the film, Godrich said that he would have to ask himself "is this as good as Spinal Tap?" Godrich became involved with the soundtrack when Wright, who had been a friend for many years, called him asking for recommendations on a music producer who could handle both the soundtrack and score.

Interviewed by Den of Geek, Edgar Wright said that he and Godrich "worked on the soundtrack for about two years [with] this idea that each of the fictional bands within the film should have a different artist doing them. So, it was sort of like casting. [...] And we just, basically, cherry picked our ultimate fantasy list of bands to do it." Michael Cera, who plays Scott Pilgrim, said that he was excited to work with Godrich; actors Cera, Mark Webber, Alison Pill, and Johnny Simmons all recorded music for the soundtrack as their characters' band, Sex Bob-Omb. Cera could already play the bass guitar, Scott's instrument, but Webber, Pill, and Simmons had to learn their instruments and were coached by Sloan's Chris Murphy; Wright has said that the production's casting did not look for musicians in particular. Though Godrich had initially reached out to the Black Lips to become Sex Bob-Omb, and Times New Viking were also considered, the band's music was based on Beck, who wrote their original songs and contributed others to the soundtrack. Beck was also worried about his contributions, saying that "the problem you see in films about garage bands or fledgling bands is that you can tell how pro the music is, it doesn't feel genuine. All I had to go on was the comic book. When I was writing the songs, I was looking at frames from the comic book." In recording, Webber, who "had never played guitar or sung before in his life", had to record over Beck's vocals with his own. The fictional band Crash and the Boys, which has songs on the soundtrack, is based on Broken Social Scene, with Crash's actor Erik Knudsen also singing; another group in the film is the Clash at Demonhead, based on Metric and fronted by actress and singer Brie Larson as Envy Adams (herself based on Metric's front-woman Emily Haines), with only Metric on the soundtrack.

Godrich reflected on the soundtrack production and the involvement of these big acts, saying that "It's one of those things where it might be better to just not hear any music and to leave it to your imagination. Then it will be as good as it will ever be. But once a few inquiries were made, and it was clear that we could maybe get those people to contribute, it was an exciting prospect." Many of the cast recordings were made at the home studio of Metric's Jimmy Shaw; the band had become friends with Wright when he moved to Toronto for pre-production.

The second song on the soundtrack is "Scott Pilgrim" by Plumtree, the song that inspired the name of the title character. Bryan Lee O'Malley, the graphic novel author, was insistent on having the song included on the soundtrack; it is one of two Plumtree songs featured in the film, and though the band is obscure, they are a favorite of O'Malley's. Similarly, Wright chose to include a version of Frank Black's "I Heard Ramona Sing", one of his favorites, because of how much he used to listen to it when he was infatuated with a girl, long before production of the film, and the coincidence that it matched the main love interest's name. Another O'Malley selection is the Beachwood Sparks version of "By Your Side", which was on the list of songs he compiled to accompany the first Scott Pilgrim graphic novel; Wright also joked that he owed the original writers of the song, Sade, "some publishing money" after having had his characters in Shaun of the Dead use a Sade album to fend off zombies. In his graphic novel playlist, O'Malley describes "By Your Side" as "a swirly cosmic countrified cover of a Sade song. It's the ultimate Scott Pilgrim love song." Also on the playlist was "Sleazy Bed Track" by The Bluetones, which then inspired Wright to suggest including a song by Blood Red Shoes, a band with a similar sound. Both "Sleazy Bed Track" and Blood Red Shoes' "It's Getting Boring by the Sea" are used.

A rehearsal of the song that inspired "We Are Sex Bob-Omb" portrayed in Bryan Lee O'Malley's graphic novel (left). Lyrics, chord progressions and fingering charts are shown between the panels and in an inset box (right).

Beck and collaborator Brian LeBarton worked on all of the Sex Bob-Omb songs, of which six are included on the original soundtrack. They wrote and recorded all of the songs over a few days in 2008; in 2020, Wright said that "Beck wrote 32 Sex Bob-Omb songs in 32 hours". They were recorded just as quickly on 8-track tape, and left rough. Lyrics for the title track "We Are Sex Bob-Omb", sung by Webber, were only added later when the production decided to use it for the opening titles. "We Are Sex Bob-Omb", played at a band rehearsal in the film, parallels an original song that was written in the corresponding rehearsal scene in the first graphic novel, where O'Malley "not only lays out all the lyrics they're singing for the reader, but also provides chord progressions, charts for fingerings and even the time signature and feel" of the song.

The graphic novels noted that Crash and the Boys' songs are three seconds long, which Godrich took as defining precisely what kind of band and sound that makes them. Knudsen recorded the lyrics for their two songs (Broken Social Scene had written four, but two were not used); O'Malley recalled that Knudsen's favorite band is Broken Social Scene, and that the actor was thrilled to be working with Kevin Drew from the band for the film. Broken Social Scene were asked to create Crash and the Boys' songs "because they had become friends of [Wright and Godrich] in Toronto". The short and loud music style is different to Broken Social Scene, but Wright described the band as versatile and suggested that they had taken inspiration from Napalm Death and similar music they had listened to as teenagers.

The soundtrack features a version of the Metric song "Black Sheep" with Haines as lead singer, per the band's request, though it is sung by actress Larson, also a musician, as the Clash at Demonhead's singer Envy Adams in the film. Metric had performed the song in concert as early as 2007, but had not released it before this soundtrack. An instrumental was also done of the Clash at Demonhead's bass player Todd Ingram, portrayed by Brandon Routh, for the song, but this was not used in the film. Routh spent "three or four months" learning to play bass for the film.

For the Sex Bob-Omb song "Ramona", Wright gave Beck the prompt to "do an acoustic song that only uses the lyrics 'Ramona, oh my my Ramona'": Beck wrote numerous versions, of simple songs, with the one played by Cera in the film being one of the most complex.

The Rolling Stones' "Under My Thumb" was also used in the film and on the soundtrack; the rights to this song are owned by ABKCO Records, who learned about the film when the production were trying to use the song. Wright says that ABKCO then saw a cut of the film and wanted to let them use it, which was also influenced by Godrich using his friends' band The Hotrats to record a cover that they all agree was uncomfortably close to the original. ABKCO then joined the project to release the soundtracks. While it is used for narrative purposes in the film, it is also said to be Wright's favorite Rolling Stones song.

The original score contains some of the melodies written by O'Malley for the graphic novels, as well as songs by Dan the Automator and Cornelius. These include the Bollywood-inspired song performed by actor Satya Bhabha as Matthew Patel and the electronic number given to the Katayanagi Twins band for their fights against Scott.

== Music ==
The soundtrack contains a mix of classic rock, alternative rock, indie, garage and post-punk.

"We Are Sex Bob-Omb"
The song "We Are Sex Bob-Omb" won a critics' award and opens the film; it features the fictional band Sex Bob-Omb's scratchy sound and vocals.

Sex Bob-Omb's sound is that of a sloppy garage rock group, and Matt Burdick describes Webber's vocals as lead singer Stephen Stills to be "yelpy". The first song of the film and soundtrack is Sex Bob-Omb's title song, "We Are Sex Bob-Omb", which plays over the opening titles and is described as a "fuzzed-up, sloppy rocker" by Todd Martens of the Los Angeles Times and "raw, down and dirty" by The Playlist's Rodrigo Perez. The BBC's Mike Diver writes that the song "roars and swaggers". Wright said of that song that "you can hear [...] that the bass drops out. The drumming rhythms change constantly because they're just hammering away." Godrich explained that the song was given to them as a short instrumental, and that they chose to use and extend it because it is "riffy" – Beck was surprised that they wanted to use it.

The band's song "Garbage Truck" is described by Perez as a "simple, mid-tempo stompy punk-fuzz number" and by Martens as a "sludgy anthem [that] is a mix of self-deprecating humor and misfit pride". While considering it to have a critical role in the film, Martens notes that its distorted levels can strain home sound systems. Webber sings the lead vocals, with a version sung by Beck included as a bonus track on the deluxe soundtrack. Wright found that Webber and Beck contrasted sharply in their delivery of the lyrics, with Beck's blending into the mix, as he had intended. As with "We Are Sex Bob-Omb", Beck has said he was surprised that the song was chosen. "Summertime", however, has clear lyrics; Beck again expressed surprise, here because he felt the song most represented Sex Bob-Omb's sound, due to its looseness, but it was mainly used over the closing credits. Wright had explained that at different points in production, the song was going to be in different parts of the film, but those cuts did not work.

"Threshold"
The song "Threshold" uses sound produced by amplifying an acoustic guitar, distorting the instrument's sound.

"Threshold", which is used near the end of the film, is described by Martens as "one of the choppiest, roughest Sex Bob-Omb songs in the film" which accelerates into the chorus with an effects-laden acoustic-electric guitar. Perez notes its distortion and feedback, calling it "wobbly punk rock". The song comes from an idea of what O'Malley imagined Sex Bob-Omb to be, from an experience in a band with a friend whose heavily distorted acoustic guitar would "really upset [the sound guy; that's] what they were originally looking like." Beck worked from the comics while composing the songs, imagining Stephen Stills to be like Kim Deal, who uses feedback to amplify her acoustic guitar with The Breeders. Beck said of "Threshold" that he felt bad for giving such a rough song to the producers, but also "proud that some of the bad notes were left in there. I think things tend to get scrubbed for Hollywood films, but this was relatively less-polished." An 8-bit version of "Threshold" by Brian LeBarton is also included on the soundtrack.

The Sex Bob-Omb song "Ramona" is only included on the soundtrack as two original versions performed by Beck, described as "lovesick longing". An acoustic version of Beck improvising the song uses the same chord progression as the film version, but with a "bumble" 41 seconds in; the orchestral version is longer with a mellotron and strings and some extra lyrics that Beck added shortly before mastering.

In line with Sex Bob-Omb's sound, Wright had a remix of Frank Black's "I Heard Ramona Sing" recorded for the soundtrack. Martens explains that "its choppy opening overlaid with a lilting guitar solo instantly smooths out the frayed beginning [and feels] like a daydream" as it marks the beginning of Scott's obsession with Ramona. Similarly, the Black Lips' "O Katrina!", in the film and on the soundtrack, is described by the producers to have the feel of a Sex Bob-Omb song. Martens writes that "Sleazy Bed Track" has a "downbeat groove and depressed lyrics [that] hint that not all will be so sweet", and that the version of "It's Getting Boring By the Sea" used has a "sharp guitar opening [that] suits the fight-like atmospheres of the film". Perez calls "It's Getting Boring By the Sea" a "spunky track [with] the exact energy you might expect from this film".

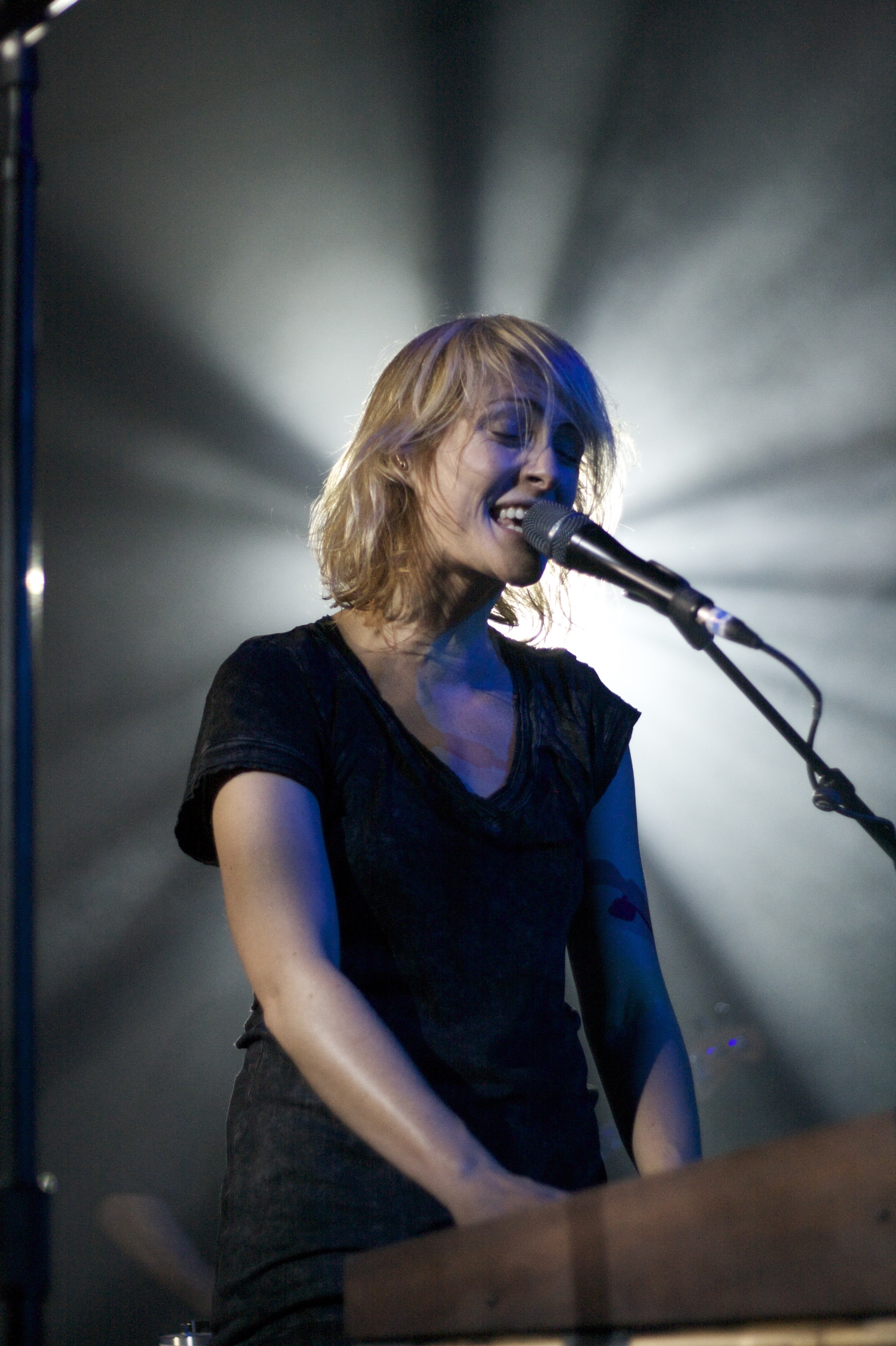
Emily Haines (pictured in 2010) sings on Metric and Broken Social Scene songs on the soundtrack.

Crash and the Boys have two songs on the soundtrack and are said to be "fast, angry and with a too-cool-for-you look" and a metal sound, with Mike Katzif calling their songs "brash, distorted, one-minute blasts". Glen Chapman said that Broken Social Scene's songs for Crash and the Boys "are almost unrecognisable from their epic pop sensibilities that typify their output". Broken Social Scene contributed some of their own songs as well, including their signature song "Anthems for a Seventeen-Year-Old Girl", which gradually adds instruments to the arrangement behind rounds of vocals by Haines. Martens found that it invites the listener to sing along, despite its "nostalgic tone". Haines told Martens that the song is "about the pains of growing up, and wanting and trying to simplify your life so you can enjoy what's valuable [...] it's about taking away all the distractions, that's the adult viewpoint."

Other previously released songs include "Scott Pilgrim", which barely features in the film; Martens notes it for an "alt-rock crust to the guitars, and a naive excitement to the vocals". "By Your Side" is described by Martens as a "lovesick slow dance of a tune, with bedside vocals and a romantically melancholic harmonica", and Perez called it an "atmospheric, harmonica-laden" song that "has that wistful and bittersweet feeling that [the soundtrack and film are] chasing in its introspective moments". Another established song on the soundtrack is T. Rex's "Teenage Dream". Wright chose to include the song, saying:

This is one of my favorite T-Rex songs. It's epic. It made me think of Knives. It sounds like a missing song from Grease. It's so lush and symphonic. I'm obviously a big T-Rex fan, but that song is so grand. It spoke to me as how we feel when we are 17 and have been dumped. You need a song that sounds like the end of the world.

"Black Sheep" (soundtrack)
Emily Haines and Metric recorded a version of "Black Sheep" for the soundtrack album, in the band's own style.

"Black Sheep" (film)
The film version of "Black Sheep" features Brie Larson and a different instrumental by Metric, designed to fit the character and story.

The Metric song "Black Sheep" included on the soundtrack is said by Haines to be like a caricature of Metric, that "aspects of the song, the electro aspects of the band, and the abstract lyrical visualizations, are extreme examples of certain aspects of [the band]". Godrich noted that because of this the song "was perfect for this film. It's not Metric. It's a shadow of Metric." Music writer Kirk Hamilton, of Kotaku, notes the differences in Larson and Haines's versions, saying that Larson's take is "sassier and a bit less rocking, and in that way, more appropriate to Envy's character"; Aoife Fealy for The Arcade wrote that Haines's vocals have a "star-gazy grunge edge", compared to Larson's "suave and sultry vocals" as Envy. The Metric instrumental for the track that is used in the film is also a different version to the soundtrack: in the film it is more sinister and has an extended intro with Larson singing "Oh yeah" on repeat to serve the story in the scene, while the soundtrack has a "heavier undertone".

James McMahon described the original score as "a more ethereal listen than the principal soundtrack", and Mike Katzif said that it "recalls the chiming ambient music of Brian Eno or the kinetic electro-rock of Daft Punk", as well as pulling tones from video games and using elements of chiptune music. Glen Chapman wrote of some of the score pieces that "there's a slow build with some beautiful tracks that sound like Sigur Rós' Untitled pieces and elements of Broken Social Scene's debut album, Feel Good Lost". The musical cues of Beck-composed Sex Bob-Omb song "Threshold" also appear within parts of the score, which Chapman found to reflect the anthemic nature of the song for the band.

== Release ==
Scott Pilgrim vs. the World: Original Motion Picture Soundtrack was released on August 10, 2010, by ABKCO Records on vinyl and compact disc. A deluxe version of the soundtrack was also released. People who pre-ordered the album on iTunes, or who purchased the deluxe version, received a bonus video of the film version of Metric's "Black Sheep" sung by Larson. A music video of Sex Bob-Omb performing "Summertime", intended to end the film but later removed, is included on the DVD, and some of Beck's original Sex Bob-Omb tracks were made available as iTunes downloads.

Scott Pilgrim vs. the World: Original Score Composed by Nigel Godrich was also released on August 10, exclusively to streaming, though Wright did suggest it would be a second disc included with the soundtrack. Wright said that he was "really pleased with the songs that we have in the film, and I'm really pleased with Nigel's score, because it's the first score that he's ever done. I think it sounds amazing."

In 2011, four unreleased Sex Bob-Omb songs were published online, including "Indefatigable", recorded by the actors and briefly used in the film, and Beck recordings of songs called "No Fun", "Disgusting Rainbow" and "Gasoline Eyes".

A new version of the album, including unreleased tracks, was announced on the film's 10th anniversary. On vinyl, the soundtrack would have "a whole new side". As well as adding songs to the soundtrack, the score would receive a physical release; in 2010 it had only been a digital download. Unreleased tracks on the re-release included more versions of the Beck song "Ramona", and Brie Larson's version of "Black Sheep". Wright tweeted that there would be 24 minutes of new songs. The expanded soundtrack and score were released as a box set of four picture discs on March 26, 2021, as the Seven Evil Exes Limited Edition; the score was also released on vinyl on the same date. A digital release, subtitled the expanded edition, was released on July 9, 2021.

== Reception ==
Professional ratings
Aggregate scores
Source	Rating
Metacritic	68/100
Review scores
Source	Rating
AllMusic	4/5 stars
Chicago Tribune	2/4 stars
Consequence of Sound	3/5 stars
Drowned in Sound	8/10
Entertainment Weekly	B
One Thirty BPM	79%
Pitchfork	6.7/10
PopMatters	6/10
PopSugar	Favorable
Punknews.org	4/5 stars
Rolling Stone	2.5/5 stars
Seattle P-I	5/5 stars

Online music database AllMusic gave the soundtrack a positive review, and Den of Geek said that the film has "one of the best soundtracks of the year". MTV shared this assessment and particularly praised the Sex Bob-Omb songs. Common Sense Media gave it a 3 out of 5 star rating, finding the soundtrack more child-appropriate than the film for its absurdist but non-explicit language, common to alt-rock.

The AllMusic review said that "soundtracks to movies adapted from comic books are often marketing free-for-alls", noting how promotional considerations often override the thematic coherence of the film, but that this "[could not] be further from the truth for Scott Pilgrim vs. the World's music." Drowned in Sound added that "with a soundtrack that captures the spirit of the comics with such fervency, conviction and discipline, Scott Pilgrim vs The World looks set to be a lot less dislikable than you might've hoped."

Matthew Perpetua for Pitchfork also noted the adaptation, saying that "for the most part, Wright and his collaborators nailed it". Perpetua felt that while Beck's songs may be a bit too good for Sex Bob-Omb, he successfully "captures the ramshackle energy implied in the comics", but notes that the movie versions are more enjoyable than the Beck versions on the soundtrack due to Beck sounding too professional for the "scrappy" songs. He comments more on the Crash and the Boys music, similarly saying that Broken Social Scene "hit their mark in terms of conveying the humor of frantic under-one-minute numbers" but that he finds the songs too plain for the fictional band "that ought to be far more weird and unreal" due to the musical superpowers they have in the graphic novel. Impact's Matt Burdick also thought the soundtrack would have been better had a Crash and the Boys song from the comics called "Last Song Kills The Audience" been included.

Den of Geek's Glen Chapman wrote that the Clash at Demonhead performing "Metric's 'Black Sheep' is the closest to what [he] imagined any of the bands would sound" like based on the comics; he said that he is disappointed that Larson's version was not on the soundtrack. He also expressed disappointment that a particular song from the film, Holy Fuck's "Latin", was not on the soundtrack.

Entertainment Weekly gave the album a B rating, praising the song "Garbage Truck", while Rolling Stone gave a more mixed review, stating that the contributions of Beck and Broken Social Scene were not strong and that "the charm of those songs fades outside the film". Perpetua also felt that they were unnecessary, but were nice songs and contributed to the design of the comic world in the music. However, Chapman noted that he listened to the soundtrack before he watched the film and that it works in isolation from the film where other soundtracks do not, adding that it "plays out like a very strong, near perfect mix tape". He found that the previously released songs were "excellent [and] absolutely appropriate for the scenes they accompany, both lyrically and musically [...] and, as such, none of the [soundtrack] inclusions are superfluous to requirements."

Writing for The Guardian, James McMahon noted Wright's care in curating his film soundtracks, and said that people going to see the film "[could] have a new favourite soundtrack to cherish", that the "soundtrack raises the bar for movie music". NPR's Mike Katzif discussed the soundtrack and concluded: "what makes this all so much fun to me is that it tries something a little different. Where most soundtracks fall into a standard, even boring format – the mixtape compilation – Scott Pilgrim's filmmakers score major bonus points for creating something that allows the music to be as crucial to the movie-watching experience as it is in the comics."

Regarding the score, Chapman said that it is as strong as the soundtrack and an equal accompaniment to the film, concluding that "the score is a work of genre-defying madness that utilises an assortment of musical styles to enhance the mood of the piece. From the aforementioned melancholic post rock to up-tempo dance pieces, this is a varied but highly effective debut score that's an interesting break from the orchestral scores that have accompanied much of the year's biggest pictures."

=== Accolades ===
The song "We Are Sex Bob-Omb" won the 2010 Houston Film Critics Society Award for Best Original Song, and was nominated for the 2010 Las Vegas Film Critics Society Sierra Award for Best Song and the 2011 Online Film & Television Association Award for Best Original Song.

It was listed as number 4 of the 40 greatest film soundtracks by The Independent, and was on AltPress's list of 16 fantastic soundtracks.

== Track listings ==
=== Soundtrack ===
Soundtrack listing
No.	Title	Writer(s)	Artist(s)	Length
1.	"We Are Sex Bob-Omb"	Beck Hansen	Sex Bob-Omb (Michael Cera, Alison Pill, Mark Webber, Beck and Brian LeBarton)	2:00
2.	"Scott Pilgrim"	Lynette Gillis; Catriona Sturton; Amanda Bidnall; Carla Gillis	Plumtree	3:02
3.	"I Heard Ramona Sing"	Charles Thompson	Frank Black	3:40
4.	"By Your Side"	Paul Denman; Andrew Hale; Sade; Stuart Matthewman	Beachwood Sparks	4:57
5.	"O Katrina!"	Ian St. Pe; Joe Bradley; Jared Swilley; Cole Alexander	Black Lips	2:51
6.	"I'm So Sad, So Very, Very Sad"	Ohad Benchetrit; Kevin Drew; Brendan Canning; Charles Spearin	Crash and the Boys (Broken Social Scene and Erik Knudsen)	0:13
7.	"We Hate You Please Die"	Ohad Benchetrit; Kevin Drew; Brendan Canning; Charles Spearin	Crash and the Boys	0:59
8.	"Garbage Truck"	Beck Hansen	Sex Bob-Omb	1:44
9.	"Teenage Dream"	Marc Bolan	T. Rex	5:45
10.	"Sleazy Bed Track"	Mark James Morriss; Scott Edward Morriss; Edward Daniel Chesters; Adam Patrick Devlin	The Bluetones	4:36
11.	"It's Getting Boring by the Sea"	Laura Carter; Steven Ansell	Blood Red Shoes	2:56
12.	"Black Sheep"	Emily Haines; James Shaw	Metric	4:56
13.	"Threshold"	Beck Hansen	Sex Bob-Omb	1:47
14.	"Anthems for a Seventeen Year-Old Girl"	Kevin Drew; Brendan Canning; Charles Spearin; James Shaw; Emily Haines; Justin Peroff; John Crossingham; Jessica Moss	Broken Social Scene	4:36
15.	"Under My Thumb"	Mick Jagger; Keith Richards	The Rolling Stones	3:41
16.	"Ramona" (acoustic version)	Beck Hansen	Beck	1:02
17.	"Ramona"	Beck Hansen	Beck	4:22
18.	"Summertime"	Beck Hansen	Sex Bob-Omb	2:10
19.	"Threshold" (8-bit version)	Beck Hansen	Brian LeBarton	1:48

Deluxe track listing
No.	Title	Writer(s)	Artist(s)	Length
20.	"Garbage Truck"	Beck Hansen	Beck	1:48
21.	"Threshold"	Beck Hansen	Beck	1:43
22.	"Summertime"	Beck Hansen	Beck	2:09

Expanded edition additional tracks
No.	Title	Writer(s)	Artist(s)	Length
20.	"Black Sheep" (Brie Larson vocal version)	Emily Haines; James Shaw	Metric featuring Brie Larson	4:54
21.	"No Fun"	Beck Hansen	Sex Bob-Omb	2:14
22.	"Garbage Truck"	Beck Hansen	Beck	1:48
23.	"Threshold"	Beck Hansen	Beck	1:43
24.	"Indefatigable"	Beck Hansen	Sex Bob-Omb	1:14
25.	"Go!"	Lynette Gillis; Carla Gillis; Catriona Sturton; Amanda Bidnall	Plumtree	2:32
26.	"Ramona" (acoustic demo idea 1)	Beck Hansen	Beck	0:53
27.	"Ramona" (acoustic demo idea 2)	Beck Hansen	Beck	1:12
28.	"Ramona" (acoustic demo idea 3)	Beck Hansen	Beck	1:07
29.	"Ramona" (Mellotron)	Beck Hansen	Beck	4:22
30.	"Summertime"	Beck Hansen	Beck	2:09
31.	"Enter Goddess"	Koji Kondo	Nigel Godrich	0:54

=== Score ===
All music is composed by Nigel Godrich, except as noted.

Score track listing
No.	Title	Writer(s)	Artist(s)	Length
1.	"Universal Theme"	Jerry Goldsmith (Note: The standard Universal fanfare was used during the film.)	Nigel Godrich	0:21
2.	"Hillcrest Park"			4:04
3.	"Fight!"			2:52
4.	"Slick (Patel's Song)" (featuring Satya Bhabha)	Dan the Automator; Bryan Lee O'Malley	Dan the Automator	1:39
5.	"Love Me Some Walking"			4:02
6.	"Talk to the Fist"			1:03
7.	"Rumble"			1:58
8.	"Feel the Wrath"			1:25
9.	"The Grind"			0:35
10.	"Hello Envy"			0:49
11.	"Mystery Attacker"			1:12
12.	"Second Cup"			1:50
13.	"The Vegan"			4:05
14.	"Bass Battle" (featuring Jason Falkner and Justin Meldal-Johnsen)			1:45
15.	"Sorry I Guess"			1:11
16.	"Roxy"			5:34
17.	"The Ninth Circle"			0:51
18.	"Katayanagi Twins vs. Sex Bob-Omb"	Beck; Cornelius	Beck & Cornelius	3:09
19.	"This Fight Is Over"			1:21
20.	"Gideon Calling"			1:02
21.	"Level 7"			0:40
22.	"Welcome to Chaos Theatre"			1:17
23.	"We Are Sex Bob-Omb" (fast)	Beck	Beck & Nigel Godrich	0:58
24.	"Fast Entrance Into Hell"			0:57
25.	"Chau Down"			1:10
26.	"Game Over"			0:52
27.	"So Alone"			2:00
28.	"Round 2"			1:25
29.	"Death to All Hipsters"	Beck	Beck & Nigel Godrich	0:41
30.	"A Different Guy"			1:05
31.	"Boss Battle"			2:46
32.	"Blowing Up Right Now"			0:46
33.	"Aftermath"			1:38
34.	"Bye and Stuff"			2:43
35.	"Love"	Osymyso	Osymyso	1:38
36.	"Ramona"	Osymyso	Osymyso	1:31
37.	"Prepare"	Osymyso	Osymyso	1:09
38.	"Ninja Ninja Revolution"	Dan the Automator	Dan the Automator	1:08

== Personnel ==
Credits adapted from Discogs:

- Art direction: Dale Voelker
- Music production coordinator for ABKCO Records: Teri Landi
- Executive producer: Edgar Wright, Marc Platt
- Executive music producer: Nigel Godrich
- Liner notes: Edgar Wright
- Mastering: Bob Ludwig
- Music executive for Universal Pictures: Mike Knobloch
- Music production for Universal Pictures: Harry Garfield
- Music supervisor: Kathy Nelson
- Thanks: Bryan Lee O'Malley

== Chart positions ==
Chart (2010)	Peak position
Australian Albums Chart	56
Canadian Albums Chart	20
Greek Albums (IFPI)	21
U.S. Billboard 200	24
U.S. Billboard Alternative Albums	4
U.S. Billboard Tastemakers	13
U.S. Billboard Top Soundtracks	2
