= ADHD (disambiguation) =

ADHD, or attention deficit hyperactivity disorder, is a neurodevelopmental disorder.

ADHD may also refer to:

- ADHD (band), an Icelandic band or their eponymous album, 2009
- ADHD (Joyner Lucas album), 2020
- A.D.H.D. (Master Shortie album), 2009
- "ADHD" (Blood Red Shoes song), 2006
- "ADHD" (Joyner Lucas song), 2019
- "A.D.H.D" (Kendrick Lamar song), 2012
- "ADHD", a song by Paris Hilton from Infinite Icon, 2024
- Animation Domination High-Def, a defunct American late-night programming block on Fox
