= Box of Secrets (Blood Red Shoes album) =

Studio album by Blood Red Shoes
- Released: 14 April 2008
- Recorded: 2007
- Genres: Indie rock, post-punk revival
- Length: 41:38
- Label: Mercury Records
- Producer: Mike Crossey + Blood Red Shoes

Blood Red Shoes chronology
I'll Be Your Eyes (2007)	Box of Secrets (2008)	Fire like This (2010)

Singles from Box of Secrets
- 1. "I Wish I Was Someone Better" Released: 29 October 2007; 2. "You Bring Me Down (re-release)" Released: 2008; 3. "Say Something, Say Anything" Released: 7 April 2008; 4. "This Is Not for You" Released: 7 July 2008

Professional ratings
Review scores
Source	Rating
Artrocker	Link
Gigwise	Link
The Guardian	Link
Drowned In Sound	(7/10) Link
NME	(7/10) Link
Q	(April '08)

Box of Secrets is the debut album by English rock band Blood Red Shoes, which was released on 14 April 2008 on the Mercury Records label. The album was leaked to the internet during November 2007.

Several of the tracks were previously released as limited edition singles by the band, including "I Wish I Was Someone Better", "ADHD", "It's Getting Boring By the Sea" and "You Bring Me Down". The latter single was re-recorded and re-issued prior to the album's release. "Try Harder" was a B-side on the original single release of "You Bring Me Down". All of the band's singles appear as re-recorded versions on Box of Secrets, with the exception of "I Wish I Was Someone Better". The single "Say Something, Say Anything" was released on 7 April 2008 to coincide with the album release.

The title track does not appear on the album. "Box of Secrets" was a B-side on the "It's Getting Boring by the Sea" single and is also featured on the compilation album I'll Be Your Eyes. The title is derived from a phrase between the two members to describe things that they can tell each other, but not anyone else.

The closing track, "Hope You're Holding Up", is the first recorded Blood Red Shoes song to feature someone other than the band themselves playing an instrument, with Harriet from Los Campesinos! playing the violin.

== Track listing ==
All tracks are written by Blood Red Shoes.

No.	Title	Length
1.	"Doesn't Matter Much"	3:25
2.	"You Bring Me Down"	3:42
3.	"Try Harder"	3:50
4.	"Say Something, Say Anything"	3:12
5.	"I Wish I Was Someone Better"	3:48
6.	"Take the Weight"	4:38
7.	"ADHD"	3:17
8.	"This Is Not for You"	4:32
9.	"It's Getting Boring by the Sea"	2:56
10.	"Forgive Nothing"	3:10
11.	"Hope You're Holding Up"	5:12
