= Al Tuck =

Canadian musician (born 1966)

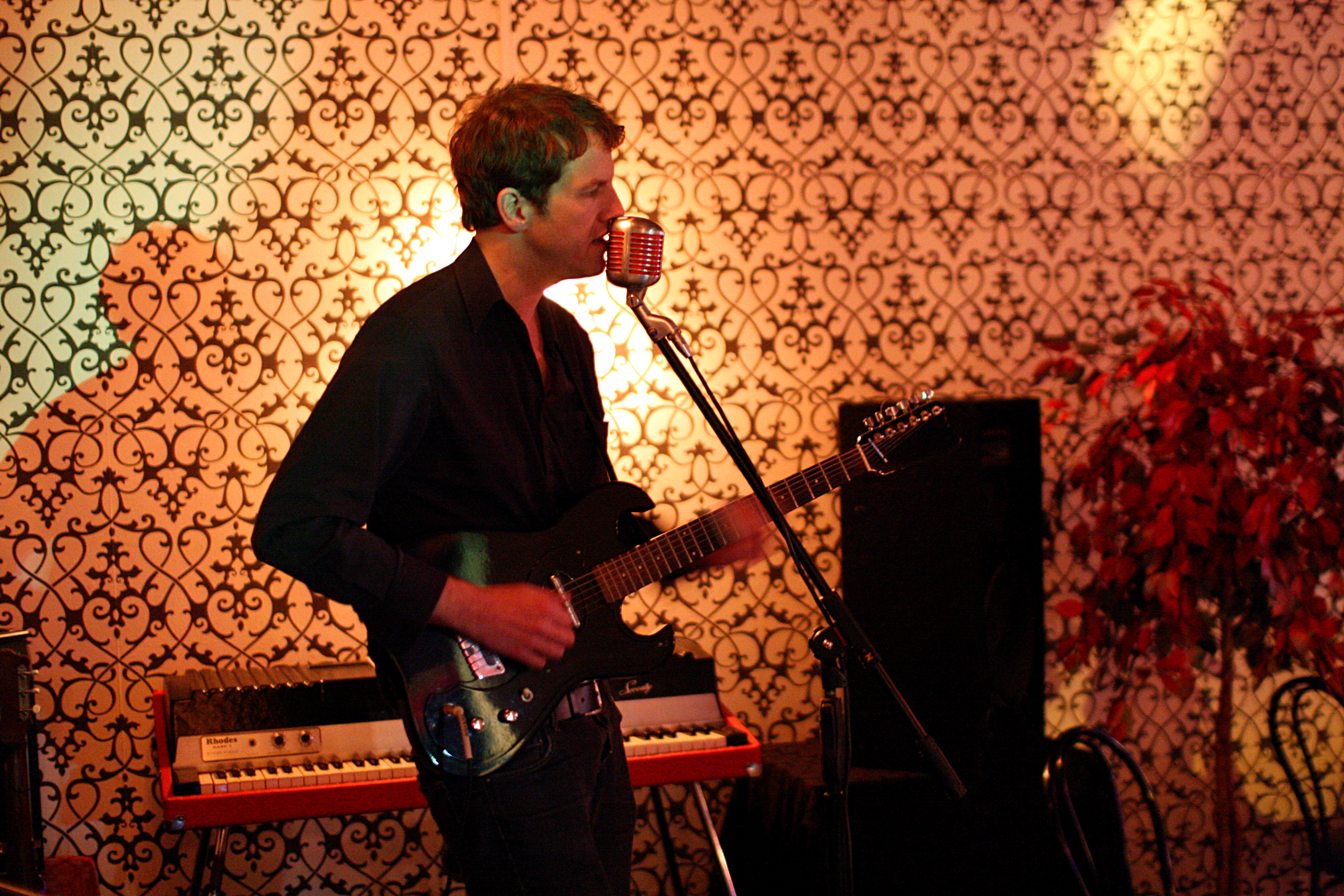

Background information
- Born: Alan Layton Tuck; December 21, 1966 (age 59); Summerside, Prince Edward Island, Canada
- Origin: Halifax, Nova Scotia, Canada
- Genres: Folk rock, indie rock
- Occupation: Singer-songwriter
- Instruments: Vocals, guitar
- Years active: 1984 – present
- Labels: Murderecords, Brobdingnagian, Youth Club
- Website: altuck.com

Al Tuck (born December 23, 1966), is a Canadian songwriter and folksinger from Prince Edward Island who has spent much of his career based in Halifax, Nova Scotia.

== Early life ==
Tuck was born in Summerside, Prince Edward Island, the son of editorial cartoonist and Anglican cleric Canon Robert Tuck. Tuck attended the University of King's College in Halifax, Nova Scotia.

== Career ==
Tuck's career started when he began appearing in Halifax coffeehouses and college pubs, either doing solo performances or with his first couple of bands, such as The Columbia Recording Artists, in the early-to-mid 80s, and then The Bluegrass Lawnmower, which existed from 1988 until 1992. Bluegrass Lawnmower received an East Coast Music Award nomination for "Unrecorded Artist Of The Year" in 1991.

Tucked formed the quartet of Al Tuck and No Action in 1993, with a "revolving cast of musicians", after the dissolution of Bluegrass Lawnmower, and with increased attention on the burgeoning Halifax independent music scene in the early 1990s.

By 1994, the band dropped down to a trio, with Tracy Stevens on bass, and Brock Caldwell on drums. This led Tuck to a recording deal with Sloan's Murderecords, which released his first two LPs: Arhoolie, and Brave Last Days, both in 1994. That same year he made an appearance at Edgefest. He also appeared on a festival bill with Soundgarden and Nine Inch Nails at Molson Park in Barrie, Ontario, playing on the CFNY-FM 'Nu Music Sidestage' alongside treble charger, The Killjoys and other acts.

During his tenure on Murderecords, a "documentary" short film was shot and produced by Colin MacKenzie (Murderecords, Cinnamon Toast Records) on Tuck, in 1995.

Tuck received another East Coast Music Award nomination for "Male Recording of the Year" in 1996.

Tuck released Food for the Moon in 2009. In a review, Now magazine wrote, "Tuck's voice – thin, rough-hewn, distinct – reaches out intimately, and his songwriting never drops beneath top-shelf."

In 2010, Tuck was the voice of Milkman Cat in the Spike Jonze-produced animated short, Higglety-Pigglety Pop!.

"Under Your Shadow" followed in 2011 under the Maple Music label. The album appeared on the !earshot Campus and Community National Top 50 Albums chart in January 2012.

In June 2013, Tuck's studio album Stranger at the Wake was longlisted for the 2013 Polaris Music Prize. Fair Country, which is a mix of original songs, co-written with poet Alex Rettie, and covers, was released digitally in 2015 and then in CD format in 2016.

December 2016 saw release of a tribute album, Behind That Big Red Curtain, featuring 15 of Tuck's songs, performed by 15 of his musical friends, and produced by Adam Gallant and Andrew Murray of Charlottetown, PEI.

Two of these songs, "In the Days When the People Were Small and Few" and "Behind that Big Red Curtain", were not previously recorded by Tuck.

Al Tuck My Blues Away, a documentary film about Tuck by Brian Harrington, was released in 2026.

== Personal life ==
Tuck previously dated Catriona Sturton, then of Plumtree, during the late 1990s, into the 2000s.

Tuck was formerly married to (and divorced from, in 2010) singer Catherine MacLellan, daughter of renowned P.E.I. songwriter Gene MacLellan. They have one daughter, Isabel.

== Discography ==
=== Albums ===
- Arhoolie (1994)
- Brave Last Days (1994)
- The New High Road of Song (2001)
- Live at the Rebecca Cohn (2002)
- My Blues Away (2005)
- 33 1/3 (2005)
- Food for the Moon (2009)
- All Time Favourites (2010 compilation)
- Under Your Shadow (2011)
- Stranger at the Wake (2013)
- Fair Country (2015)
- Days of the Looking Glass (Al Tuck Sings Gene MacLellan) (2019)
- Water, Blood & Whiskey (2023)

=== Compilations ===
- "Bone Of Contention" (live) – Cod Can't Hear – The Halifax Independent Music Festival (1992) (with Bluegrass Lawnmower)
- "Use Your Imagination" – Hear & Now ’92: The Best of the East Coast's Independent Bands (1992) (with Bluegrass Lawnmower)
- "25-12 Blues" – A Four Track Christmas (Cinnamon Toast Records, 1994)
- "Sleepyhead (Al's Lullaby)" – I'm Going Crazy in This Town (1996)
- "In The Days Where People Were Small And Few" – Sixty Second Songs (2002)
- "The Sky Is Too Blue" – Here Comes The Gold (2016)
