= In Time to Voices =

In Time To Voices

Studio album by Blood Red Shoes
- Released: 26 March 2012
- Recorded: October–December, 2011
- Studio: Motor Museum, Liverpool
- Genre: Alternative rock, indie rock, garage rock
- Length: 39:11
- Label: V2
- Producer: Mike Crossey & Blood Red Shoes

Blood Red Shoes chronology
Fire like This (2010)	In Time To Voices (2012)	Blood Red Shoes (2014)

Singles from In Time To Voices
- 1. "Cold" Released: 19 March 2012; 2. "In Time to Voices" Released: 23 August 2012

In Time To Voices is the third album by English rock band Blood Red Shoes, released on 26 March 2012 in the UK and Europe through V2 Records. The album was recorded and mixed in Autumn 2011 as a co-production with Mike Crossey, and was preceded by the singles "Cold" on 19 March 2012 and the title track "In Time to Voices" on 23 August 2012.

== Recording ==
The band spent most of 2011 writing new songs for the follow-up to Fire like This. After spending the summer playing various festivals, they played their last show of 2011 on 17 September and began recording the album a few weeks later at the Motor Museum studio in Liverpool, again with Mike Crossey, who also produced Box of Secrets and Fire Like This. Recording started on 18 October 2011. On 12 December 2011, the band revealed the first teaser from the album on their website, with a video from the studio, with three more videos to be revealed before the album's release. During early January 2012, the band recorded b-sides, bonus tracks and alternate versions of songs for the album's release.

In a press release, Carter described the album as follows: "With this album we totally threw out the rulebook of how we write and record. We decided we wanted to make a really ambitious record, not something which reflects our live show but something which is only limited by our imaginations and not by how many instruments we use onstage. We figured the best way to push ourselves forward was to write the best possible songs and melodies we could - once you have that as your foundation, you have the freedom to go anywhere with the sounds you use. We feel like a totally different band now. We feel like we're shooting for the stars."

== Reception ==
Professional ratings
Review scores
Source	Rating
AllMusic	3.5/5 stars
Alternative Press	3.5/5 stars
Artrocker	4/5 stars
Drowned In Sound	8/10
The Independent	4/5 stars
Kerrang!	4/5 stars
Loud and Quiet	8/10 stars
MusicOMH	4/5 stars
Sputnikmusic	3.5/5

At Metacritic, In Time to Voices received 70/100, based on 12 reviews, indicating "Generally favourable reviews". Jon O'Brien at AllMusic states "Foals producer Mike Crossey may remain the only real constant from their more ferocious first two albums, but that's not to say they've lost their edge." However, O'Brien criticizes the album for ending in a "whimper" rather than a "bang", due to the closing tracks. Simon Price of The Independent observes: "While they haven't quite justified their claim to have thrown away the rulebook, they're executing their spooked alt-rock with added poise and class". Price praises the album for the focus on the songwriting and hooks that "get under your skin". Sputnikmusic staff reviewer Davey Boy opined: "It is more than an admirable attempt at growth, since its expansively fuller sound IS growth. And yet, one cannot help but get the feeling that Blood Red Shoes are still capable of much better."

Jen Dan from Adequacy.net described the album as "[refining] their indie rock sound yet again", but compares it unfavourably to Box of Secrets, calling it "not as spectacularly primal" as that album. At Shields Gazette, it is considered as a "progression" of their style by "greater ambition complementing their garage roots".

== Track listing ==
All songs written and composed by Blood Red Shoes.

1. "In Time to Voices" - 3:44
2. "Lost Kids" - 3:45
3. "Cold" - 3:32
4. "Two Dead Minutes" - 3:41
5. "The Silence and the Drones" - 4:30
6. "Night Light" - 2:56
7. "Je Me Perds" - 1:28
8. "Stop Kicking" - 3:11
9. "Slip Into Blue" - 4:14
10. "Down Here in the Dark" - 3:22
11. "7 Years" - 4:48
12. "Sleepless" (bonus track) - 3:00
