= Not for You (disambiguation) =

"Not for You" is a song by Pearl Jam from the album Vitalogy. It may also refer to:

- "Not for You", a song by Natalie Bassingthwaighte from the album 1000 Stars
- "Not for You", a song by Red Fang from the album Only Ghosts
- Not for You, an album by the band Mower

== See also ==
- "This Is Not for You", a song by Blood Red Shoes
