= Strawberry (band) =

Canadian indie pop band

- Origin: Prince Edward Island
- Genres: Indie pop
- Years active: 1993–1998
- Labels: Cinnamon Toast, Janken Pon/Cargo Records, No
- Past members: Deirdre Smith; Scott Garratt; Brian Arsenault; Mike MacDougall; Pat Deighan; Craig MacPherson; Jon King; Roger Carter; Kieran Macnamara; Simon Moore

Strawberry was a Canadian indie pop group formed on Prince Edward Island in 1993. Vocalist Deirdre Smith, guitarist Scott Garratt, and bassist Brian Arsenault comprised the foundation of the band. Other members, at various times, included Mike MacDougall, Pat Deighan, Craig MacPherson, Jon King, Roger Carter, Kieran Macnamara and Simon Moore.

In 1994, they released a split-7" single with Plumtree on Cinnamon Toast Records. Two cassette-only albums were self-released, Strawberry (1993) and Beached (1995).

In 1996, the band signed to Janken Pon/Cargo Records. The label released Strawberry's "Into the Sky" 7-inch single that year.

No Records released the band's only full-length album, Brokeheart Audio, in 1998.

Deirdre Smith subsequently went on to perform and record with the post-rock group Valley of the Giants.

Brokeheart Audio was shortlisted for the Polaris Heritage Prize at the 2025 Polaris Music Prize.
