= I Love =

I Love may refer to:

- I Love (EP), by (G)I-dle, 2022
- "I Love" (Joyner Lucas song), 2018
- "I Love" (Tom T. Hall song), 1973
- I Love, an Indian TV channel owned by Pen India Limited
- I Love..., British album brand
