= Revenge (Joyner Lucas song) =

2020 single by Joyner Lucas

Single by Joyner Lucas

from the album ADHD
- Released: February 3, 2020
- Genre: Hip hop
- Length: 4:29
- Label: Twenty Nine
- Songwriters: Gary Lucas Jr.; Matthew Samuels; Jahaan Sweet; Kevin Deepnarine; Michał Suski
- Producers: Boi-1da; Sweet; Sonorous; DrtWrk

Joyner Lucas singles chronology
"ADHD" (2019)	"Revenge" (2020)	"Lotto" (2020)

Music video
- "ADHD with Revenge Intro" on YouTube
- "Revenge" on YouTube

"Revenge" is a song by American rapper Joyner Lucas, released on February 3, 2020 as the seventh single from his debut studio album ADHD (2020). It was produced by Boi-1da, Jahaan Sweet, Sonorous and DrtWrk.

== Background ==
The song premiered on Zane Lowe's Beats 1, in which Lucas stated he was in a bad mood when he wrote it.

== Composition ==
The production uses a "haunting" piano loop. Lyrically, the song centers on Joyner Lucas' diminishing returns of his own success and his toxic and destructive behavior. Lucas raps with aggression while in a reflective state.

== Critical reception ==
Mitch Findlay of HotNewHipHop praised Joyner Lucas' performance, commenting he "deftly controls his cadence to build anticipation for the inevitable drop. When the drums do hit, they add a new layer of urgency to his reflection." In addition, he stated "Of all the songs released thus far, 'Revenge' feels like a highlight in many ways. Easily the darkest fragment of the picture, Joyner's intensity and seemingly endless array of flows speak to the hunger within him." Victor D. Infante of Telegram & Gazette reacted favorably to the song as well as its music video, remarking that "'Revenge' makes good use of two of Lucas' greatest strengths as an artist: A gift for narrative storytelling in his music and videos, and an ability to tightly wind his rhymes, delivering them with control and precision."

== Music video ==
On December 13, 2019, the music video for Joyner Lucas' song "ADHD" was released with a preview of "Revenge" in the beginning. It sees Lucas standing outside a pharmaceutical facility with a bomb strapped to his chest and being confronted by a SWAT team. As the bomb explodes, the song ends and the video for "ADHD" starts.

An official music video was released in February 2020. Directed by Lucas and Ben Proulx, it begins with Lucas participating in a bank heist that ends with him being betrayed and left for dead by a partner. Lucas returns and takes revenge.

== Charts ==
Chart (2020)	Peak position
New Zealand Hot Singles (RMNZ)	27

== Certifications ==
Region	Certification	Certified units/sales
United States (RIAA)	Gold	500,000^{‡}
^{‡} Sales+streaming figures based on certification alone.
