= Air Traffic Control (band) =

Canadian power pop/rock band

- Origin: Lunenburg, Nova Scotia, Canada
- Genre: Rock
- Years active: 1993–present
- Labels: Third Side Music; No Records; Fontana North Distribution; Universal Music Canada
- Members: Kirk Comstock; Jordi Comstock; Luke Comstock
- Past members: Simon Reinhardt; Phillip Clark; Hugh Morse; Phil Zwicker
- Website: https://airtrafficcontrolband.com

Air Traffic Control is a power pop/rock band from Nova Scotia's South Shore.

== History ==
Brothers Kirk and Jordi Comstock made their first foray into music while in elementary school. By 1991, both were playing all-ages and bar shows in and around the Maritimes, under the name Madhat. In 1993, they released the independent EP Freak, produced and engineered by Len frontman Marc Costanzo and released on Halifax indie label No Records. This received the attention of local radio station CKBW, which would feature the trio prominently in local programming.

In 1995, they released their second EP Hardhitters. Full Length was released in 1998. This was Madhat's first full album and its success brought Madhat to a national audience. Madhat released two more albums, both of which included musician Simon Reinhardt: From the Outside in 2000 and To the World in 2002.

In 2005, Madhat added guitarist and keyboardist Phillip Clark to the band and changed their name to Air Traffic Control. On February 12, 2005, they released the album Air Traffic Control, and garnered a nomination for New Group of the Year at the Nova Scotia Music Week conference. The trio's opening track, "Feel Proud", was selected as the title song for the Electronic Arts game Rugby 2005 and was featured in the YTV series 15 Love.

In 2007, they released the album To Be Free. That was followed in the same year by S/T, Can't Kill Love in 2009 and Tear the House Down in 2012.

In 2011, they received a Rock Recording of the Year nomination from the East Coast Music Association. The band's music has appeared on Much Music, Satellite Radio, the television shows Degrassi: The Next Generation, Golden Boy, The Mysteries of Laura, Kingdom, and radio stations across Canada and the United States.

Following the release of Tear the House Down, the band went on hiatus; Jordi Comstock spent several years playing and producing with other bands. On November 1, 2021, the band released the album No Horse Kids

== Discography ==
- 1993 - Freak (as Madhat)
- 1995 - Hardhitters (as Madhat)
- 1998 - Full Length (as Madhat)
- 2000 - From the Outside (as Madhat)
- 2002 - To the World (as Madhat)
- 2005 - Air Traffic Control
- 2007 - To Be Free
- 2007 - S/T
- 2009 - Can't Kill Love
- 2012 - Tear the House Down
- 2021 - No Horse Kids
