= Blood Red Shoes (album) =

Studio album by Blood Red Shoes
- Released: 3 March 2014
- Recorded: 2013
- Genre: Alternative rock, stoner rock
- Length: 37:36
- Label: Jazz Life
- Producer: Blood Red Shoes

Blood Red Shoes chronology
In Time to Voices (2012)	Blood Red Shoes (2014)	Get Tragic (2019)

Singles from Blood Red Shoes
- 1. "The Perfect Mess" Released: 1 December 2013; 2. "An Animal" Released: 10 March 2014; 3. "Speech Coma" Released: 2 June 2014

Professional ratings
Aggregate scores
Source	Rating
Metacritic	64/100
Review scores
Source	Rating
NME	7/10 stars
musicOMH	3/5 stars
Drowned In Sound	8/10 stars
This Is Fake DIY	3/5 stars

Blood Red Shoes is the fourth album by Brighton-based rock band Blood Red Shoes, released on 3 March 2014 in the UK and Europe through Jazz Life Records. The album was recorded over a 6-month period in Berlin and was entirely self-produced and engineered by the band themselves. The first song from the album, "The Perfect Mess", was released on 1 December 2013, after 10 QR codes were found in different cities by the band's fans.

== Recording ==
After releasing the Water EP in January 2013 (the first new Blood Red Shoes material since their third album In Time to Voices), the band moved to Berlin for six months to write and record the new album. Entirely self-produced, it is the first Blood Red Shoes album to not be a co-production with usual collaborator Mike Crossey. The album was also the first release by the band to be released through their own imprint, Jazz Life. In a press release, drummer Steven Ansell stated: "For this album we packed up all our stuff, got in a van and drove to Berlin, where we lived for months in a rented studio space. No producer, no engineer, no A&R people, just us two in a big concrete room in Kreuzberg, jamming and recording our songs whenever we wanted, how we wanted with nobody to answer to except ourselves. It came out as our rawest, heaviest, sexiest and most confident sounding record so far".

== Release and promotion ==
On 20 November 2013, the band announced the release of a new single on 1 December 2013. The release of the single was dependent on the scanning of ten QR codes which were placed in ten different cities for fans of the band to find. QR codes were placed in Lisbon, New York City, Brussels, Moscow, Amsterdam, Jakarta, Mexico City, London, Paris and Berlin. Once all ten QR codes were scanned, "The Perfect Mess" was uploaded to the band's SoundCloud and embedded on their website, which crashed for a short while due to server overload from fans trying to hear the new song.

On 3 December 2013, the band announced details of the new album, self-titled to reflect the band's decision to produce and engineer the album themselves, as well as the release date and details on how to pre-order. The album was released on CD, LP, a deluxe 2-CD set and a deluxe bundle including the 2 CDs, a signed Vinyl LP, a T-shirt and a 12x12 art print. The deluxe CD includes a live album called 14 Photographs featuring 14 recordings from the band's European tour in late 2012.

The first official single was "An Animal", available as a limited edition 7" vinyl, with an exclusive song on the b-side, "Wretch" featuring Eoin Loveless from the band Drenge.

The album cover was designed by WeThreeClub, and the woman featured on the cover is guitarist Laura-Mary Carter's sister.

== Track listing ==
All songs written and composed by Blood Red Shoes.

1. "Welcome Home" - 1:50
2. "Everything All At Once" - 2:39
3. "An Animal" - 3:03
4. "Grey Smoke" - 3:24
5. "Far Away" - 3:22
6. "The Perfect Mess" - 3:29
7. "Behind A Wall" - 3:17
8. "Stranger" - 3:59
9. "Speech Coma" - 2:30
10. "Don't Get Caught" - 3:49
11. "Cigarettes in the Dark" - 3:28
12. "Tightwire" - 2:46

The iTunes edition features the exclusive track "Teufelzunge"

14 Photographs (live album available on deluxe edition)

1. "It's Getting Boring By The Sea" -2:51
2. "Don't Ask" - 3:05
3. "Heartsink" - 3:42
4. "Say Something, Say Anything" - 3:23
5. "Lost Kids" - 3:34
6. "Light It Up" - 3:54
7. "This Is Not For You" - 4:15
8. "Cold" - 3:43
9. "It Is Happening Again" - 3:30
10. "You Bring Me Down" - 3:48
11. "In Time To Voices" - 3:42
12. "Colours Fade" - 6:22
13. "I Wish I Was Someone Better" - 3:56
14. "Je Me Perds" - 3:52
