= ISIS (song) =

Single by Joyner Lucas featuring Logic

from the album ADHD
- Released: May 24, 2019
- Length: 3:56
- Label: Twenty Nine
- Songwriters: Gary Lucas, Jr.; Sir Robert Bryson Hall II; Matthew Samuels; Brian Eisner; Joel Puente
- Producers: Boi-1da; Nox Beatz; Rocktee

Joyner Lucas singles chronology
"Devil's Work" (2019)	"ISIS" (2019)	"Broke and Stupid" (2019)

Logic singles chronology
"Homicide" (2019)	"ISIS" (2019)	"These Days" (2019)

Music video
- "ISIS" on YouTube

"ISIS" is a song by American rapper Joyner Lucas featuring fellow American rapper Logic, released as the third single from Lucas' debut studio album ADHD (2020) on May 24, 2019. The music video was released the day before.

== Background ==
Before the release of "ISIS", Joyner Lucas and Logic were involved in an ongoing rivalry. As such, the song marks the end of the issues between the two rappers. In 2017, Lucas told Billboard magazine that his relationship with Logic started to sour during their 2016 Tech N9ne collaboration, "Sriracha". The two had since gone on to take multiple shots at each other, including an incident where Lucas claimed that Logic "can rap" but he "tries to prove that he's black too much for me". Billboard noted how, in "ISIS", Logic interpolates Notorious B.I.G.'s "What's Beef" into the chorus and "flips it into talking about the common ground he discovered with Joyner".

== Music video ==
The music video was released alongside the song on May 24, 2019, with Lucas and Logic rapping in uniforms at an army base.

== Commercial performance ==
"ISIS" debuted at number 59 on the US Billboard Hot 100, becoming Joyner Lucas's highest-charting song as a lead artist on the chart.

== Charts ==
Chart (2019)	Peak position
Australia (ARIA)	41
Canada Hot 100 (Billboard)	39
Greece International Digital Singles (IFPI)	17
Hungary (Stream Top 40)	37
Ireland (IRMA)	26
Lithuania (AGATA)	61
New Zealand (Recorded Music NZ)	28
Scottish Singles Sales (Official Charts)	53
Slovakia Singles Digital (ČNS IFPI)	87
Sweden (Sverigetopplistan)	73
Switzerland (Schweizer Hitparade)	62
UK Singles (Official Charts)	42
US Billboard Hot 100	59
US Hot R&B/Hip-Hop Songs (Billboard)	24

== Certifications ==
Region	Certification	Certified units/sales
Australia (ARIA)	Gold	35,000^{‡}
Norway (IFPI Norway)	Gold	30,000^{‡}
New Zealand (RMNZ)	Platinum	30,000^{‡}
United Kingdom (BPI)	Silver	200,000^{‡}
United States (RIAA)	2× Platinum	2,000,000^{‡}
^{‡} Sales+streaming figures based on certification alone.
