= Fire like This =

Studio album by Blood Red Shoes
- Released: 1 March 2010
- Recorded: 2009
- Studios: Motor Museum, Liverpool
- Genre: Alternative rock
- Length: 41:06
- Label: V2
- Producers: Mike Crossey & Blood Red Shoes

Blood Red Shoes chronology
| Box of Secrets (2008) | Fire like This (2010) | In Time to Voices (2012) |

Singles from Fire like This
- 1. "Colours Fade" Released: 25 November 2009; 2. "Light It Up" Released: 22 February 2010; 3. "Don't Ask" Released: 10 May 2010; 4. "Heartsink" Released: 16 August 2010

Professional ratings
Aggregate scores
| Source | Rating |
|---|---|
| Metacritic | 70/100 |
Review scores
| Source | Rating |
| Artrocker | 5/5 stars |
| BBC | (favourable) |
| Clash (magazine) | 8/10 stars |
| Drowned in Sound | 9/10 stars |
| Gigwise | 4/5 stars |
| The Music Fix | 8/10 stars |
| MusicOMH | 2/5 stars |
| NME | 8/10 stars |
| Pitchfork | (7.4/10) |
| Punktastic | 4/5 stars |
| Rock Sound | 7/10 stars |
| This Is Fake DIY | 9/10 stars |

Fire like This is the second album by Brighton-based rock band Blood Red Shoes, released on 1 March 2010 in the UK and Europe through V2 Records. The album was recorded and mixed in late summer 2009 as a co-production with Mike Crossey, and was preceded by the free download single "Colours Fade", which was released on their website on 25 November 2009, and "Light It Up", which was released on 7" vinyl and via download on 22 February 2010. In January 2010, Blood Red Shoes started putting songs on their website for streaming one by one. By 26 February, the entire album was available to listen to on the site. The album was released in the USA and Canada on 12 October 2010.

On two tracks of the recording, "When We Wake" and "Colours Fade", the Springtime is used, a custom guitar with multiple outputs especially built for Carter in 2008.

The song "When We Wake" was used in late 2010 on the TV Show Huge; "Colours Fade" appears in an episode of CSI: NY season 8.

== Track listing ==
All songs written and composed by Blood Red Shoes.

1. "Don't Ask" — 3:07
2. "Light It Up" — 3:59
3. "It Is Happening Again" - 3:40
4. "When We Wake" — 4:33
5. "Keeping It Close" — 3:21
6. "Count Me Out" — 3:39
7. "Heartsink" — 3:39
8. "Follow the Lines" — 3:35
9. "One More Empty Chair" — 4:23
10. "Colours Fade" — 7:08

=== Bonus tracks ===
11. "We Get Bored" — 3:44 (Japan-only Bonus Track)
12. "Sulphites" — 3:18 (iTunes Exclusive)

== Charts ==
| Chart (2010) | Peak position |
|---|---|
| UK Albums Chart | 95 |
