= Get Tragic =

Studio album by Blood Red Shoes
- Released: January 25, 2019
- Studios: Seymour Studio, Los Angeles; Brighton Electric, Brighton
- Length: 37:36
- Label: Jazz Life Records
- Producer: Nick Launay

Blood Red Shoes chronology
Blood Red Shoes (2014)	Get Tragic (2019)	Ghosts on Tape (2022)

Singles from Get Tragic
- 1. "Mexican Dress" Released: 18 September 2018

Professional ratings
Aggregate scores
Source	Rating
AnyDecentMusic?	7.7/10
Metacritic	82/100
Review scores
Source	Rating
Drowned in Sound	9/10
MusicOMH	4.5/5 stars
The Independent	3/5 stars

Get Tragic is the fifth studio album by British band Blood Red Shoes. It was released in January 2019 under Jazz Life Records.

== Background and composition ==
After the release of the band's fourth self-titled album, the members were considering a hiatus. During this period, singer Laura-Mary Carter moved to the US and collaborated with Natalie Chahal and together with drummer Jorma Vik they founded a one-off band Shit Girlfriend. They released one single, "Mummy's Boy / I Don't Want To Die", on 22 April 2017. During her stay in the US, Carter suffered a broken arm in a motorcycle accident. Because of the injury, her songwriting became more vocal-oriented and she started using keyboard instruments more often. Drummer Steven Ansell commented on this period: "[I] went out and took drugs and went clubbing for about half a year. I don’t remember a lot about it. Classic break-up move, right?” When the duo reunited again and started composing a new album, they decided to call it Get Tragic because of these circumstances.

In an interview with the Swiss music magazine Indiespect, Laura-Mary Carter commented on the different sound of the album: "I didn’t really sing that much on the other records, how I liked to sing. It gave me time to explore my voice which was really cool. That changed how the sound of the record is and it was the biggest thing that came out for me out of that." Ansell added: "This record is much more depressing than the one before. But that’s just where we were mentally. [...] Actually, forcing ourselves to try different things, that’s a really unpleasant process. You take away all the things that are comfortable, easy and you know and like. Then you’re making music and constantly throw it away. We were exploring so many things that weren’t good enough. It was like a constant process of failure. That was quite upsetting to go through, creatively."

== Critical reception ==
Get Tragic received generally positive reviews from critics. Metacritic, which assigns a normalised rating based on a range of reviews from several sources, aggregated the album's average review score to 82 out of 100, based on seven reviews. MusicOMH's Sam Shepherd stated that the band "have never sounded so focused and alive" a praised its "assertive guitars and pounding drum patterns". Drowned In Sound's Nicoletta Wylde concluded that "Get Tragic, quite candidly, is a virtually perfect record" because of its "catchy choruses, glam-rock guitars, electronic riffs that don’t leave your mind for days, mind-blowing lyrics", Josh Gray of Clash, however, felt that the album "lacks the untethered aggression of past efforts".

== Track listing ==
No.	Title	Length
1.	"Eye To Eye"	3:40
2.	"Mexican Dress"	3:59
3.	"Bangsar"	2:32
4.	"Nearer"	3:54
5.	"Beverly"	4:38
6.	"Find My Own Remorse"	4:07
7.	"Howl"	2:54
8.	"(Interlude)"	0:49
9.	"Anxiety"	3:05
10.	"Vertigo"	3:07
11.	"Elijah"	4:55
Total length:		37:36

Japan bonus track
No.	Title	Length
12.	"God Complex"	3:21
Total length:		41:09

== Charts ==
Chart	Peak position
Belgian Albums (Ultratop Flanders)	117
German Albums (Offizielle Top 100)	60
Scottish Albums (Official Charts)	57
UK Albums (Official Charts)	58
UK Independent Albums (Official Charts)	3
