= Devil's Work =

Single by Joyner Lucas

from the album ADHD
- Released: May 2, 2019
- Genre: Conscious hip hop
- Length: 4:45
- Label: Twenty Nine
- Songwriter(s): Gary Lucas, Jr.; Bartosz Welka; Marcin Gerik; Bob Foster
- Producer(s): SoSpecial

Joyner Lucas singles chronology
"Just Let Go" (2019)	"Devil's Work" (2019)	"ISIS" (2019)

Music video
- "Devil's Work" on YouTube

"Devil's Work" is a song by American rapper Joyner Lucas, released on May 2, 2019. It is the second single from his debut studio album ADHD (2020). The song was written by Lucas, Bartosz Jakub Welka, Marcin Gerek and Bob Foster, and produced by SoSpecial.

== Content ==
Lyrically, Joyner Lucas expresses a message to God, where he queries about why God has taken the lives of so many great people, instead keeping many wicked people. Lucas pays tribute to those who he believes did not deserve their deaths, such as Tupac Shakur, The Notorious B.I.G., Big Pun, XXXTentacion, Selena, Aaliyah, Martin Luther King Jr., Malcolm X, Lil Snupe, Eazy-E, Trayvon Martin, Nipsey Hussle, Emmett Till, Whitney Houston, Michael Jackson, and Sandra Bland. He asks God to resurrect them, and says he is willing to trade them with people who he believes deserve to die, such as Suge Knight, Donald Trump, Martin Shkreli, R. Kelly, Eric Holder (referring to Nipsey Hussle's murderer), George Zimmerman, Dylann Roof, James Holmes, Tomi Lahren, and Laura Ingraham.

== Music video ==
The official music video was released alongside the song on May 2, 2019. It was filmed in the St. Peters Catholic Church in Worcester, Massachusetts. In it, he drinks from a bottle of Hennessy while holding a bible. Around him, there are photos of people he mentioned on funereal easels. Lucas raps his questions about the deaths as if talking to God.

== Controversy ==
The lyrics, which discuss the people Joyner wants to return to life and the ones he does not, have stirred up a lot of controversy. Monsignor Francis Scollan, the priest of the church where Lucas shot the video, said that he would not have given the rapper permission to do so if he had known about what was going to be in it. However, according to Lucas, the church was really aware of it and got paid. Tomi Lahren tweeted in response to the video, "Truly disgusting. You don't have to like me or respect me but this is too far. This isn't "art" it's sick."

== Charts ==
Chart (2019)	Peak position
Ireland (IRMA)	72
New Zealand Hot Singles (RMNZ)	7
US Bubbling Under Hot 100 (Billboard)	5
US Hot R&B/Hip-Hop Songs (Billboard)	46

== Certifications ==
Region	Certification	Certified units/sales
United States (RIAA)	Gold	500,000^{‡}
^{‡} Sales+streaming figures based on certification alone.
