= I Wish I Was Someone Better =

Single by Blood Red Shoes

from the album Box of Secrets
- Released: 29 October 2007
- Label: V2 Records
- Songwriter(s): Laura-Mary Carter, Steven Ansell

Blood Red Shoes singles chronology
"It's Getting Boring By The Sea" (2007)	"I Wish I Was Someone Better" (2007)	"You Bring Me Down" (2008)

"I Wish I Was Someone Better" is the sixth single by English alternative rock band Blood Red Shoes. It was released on V2 Records on 29 October 2007, available on 7" vinyl or as a digital download via iTunes, and appears on the band's album Box of Secrets. Upon release, the single reached #186 in the UK Singles Chart.

The song's monochrome music video was directed by Ben Rollason. It is a prototypical example of the controlled, riff-based rock music that Blood Red Shoes are reputable for. In contrast, the B-Side for the single, "The Way It Goes", is a more sedate song that is based entirely on overlapping vocal tracks.

== Track listing ==
=== 7" ===
1. "I Wish I Was Someone Better"
2. "The Way It Goes"

== Personnel ==
Laura-Mary Carter – guitar, vocals
Steven Ansell – drums, vocals
