= Ghosts on Tape =

Studio album by Blood Red Shoes
- Released: 14 January 2022
- Studio: Echo Zoo Studios (Eastbourne); Jazz Life West
- Genre: Alternative rock
- Length: 38:27
- Label: Jazz Life
- Producer: Tom Dalgety

Blood Red Shoes chronology
| Get Tragic (2019) | Ghosts on Tape (2022) |

Ghosts on Tape is the sixth studio album by Brighton-based rock band Blood Red Shoes, released on 14 January 2022 in the UK and Europe via the band's label Jazz Life. Written and recorded in 2019, its release was postponed due to restrictions associated with the global COVID-19 pandemic.

== Background and composition ==
Soon after the release of their previous album Get Tragic on 25 January 2019, the band started writing new songs for another studio album. Guitarist Laura-Mary Carter described the writing process: "It was all in one month, but it wasn't like we were working every day, so it was probably about two weeks, maybe three."

Carter stated that when writing the lyrics: "We were listening to a lot of murder podcasts, and that's definitely come out on this record I think. Also because we were writing in the States and a lot of these crimes were based there, it all just sort of seeped onto the album somehow."

== Release ==
Drummer Steven Ansell expressed his frustration with not being able to properly support an album during COVID-19 restrictions: "We'd made the record and then put it on pause because of lockdown and everything going bonkers, because we were thinking we can't release the record until we can tour it, then in the meantime we got really bored and restless so we just started writing."

Six more songs were written and recorded and eventually released on the Ø EP on 18 June 2021. Three songs from the album were made available digitally, "Morbid Fascination" on 28 October 2021, "I Am Not You" on 25 November 2021 and "Murder Me" on 6 January 2022.

Ghosts on Tape was released on CD, vinyl and digitally in Europe on 14 January 2022. Three hundred signed clear vinyl copies were sold exclusively via Rough Trade UK, cassettes were also available in the UK.

== Critical reception ==
Professional ratings
Aggregate scores
| Source | Rating |
|---|---|
| AnyDecentMusic? | 7.2/10 |
| Metacritic | 69/100 |
Review scores
| Source | Rating |
| God Is in the TV | 90 |
| The Skinny | 3/5 stars |
| Under the Radar | 8/10 |

Ghosts on Tape received generally positive reviews from critics. AnyDecentMusic?, which assigns a normalised rating based on a range of reviews from several sources, aggregated the album's average review score to 7.2 out of 10, based on six reviews. Andy Von Pip from Under the Radar wrote that the band "have never sounded so vital" even after 17 years of playing together, The Skinny's Cheri Amour, however, noted "a surprising amount of solo songs". Several critics praised the album's mixture of genres, At the Barrier's John Barlass calling it "a hugely successful mélange of pop, rock, grunge, punk and electronica".

== Track listing ==
| No. | Title | Length |
|---|---|---|
| 1. | "COMPLY" | 3:39 |
| 2. | "MORBID FASCINATION" | 3:46 |
| 3. | "MURDER ME" | 3:34 |
| 4. | "(i've been watching you)" | 0:35 |
| 5. | "GIVE UP" | 4:11 |
| 6. | "SUCKER" | 3:32 |
| 7. | "BEGGING" | 3:18 |
| 8. | "(you claim to understand)" | 0:36 |
| 9. | "I AM NOT YOU" | 3:23 |
| 10. | "DIG A HOLE" | 3:30 |
| 11. | "I LOSE WHATEVER I OWN" | 4:07 |
| 12. | "(what have you been waiting for?)" | 0:36 |
| 13. | "FOUR TWO SEVEN" | 3:30 |
| Total length: | | 38:24 |
