= Say Something, Say Anything =

Single by Blood Red Shoes
- Released: 7 April 2008
- Label: V2 Records

Blood Red Shoes singles chronology
"You Bring Me Down" (2008)	"Say Something, Say Anything" (2008)	"This Is Not for You" (2008)

"Say Something, Say Anything" is a single by the English alternative rock band, Blood Red Shoes, released on 7 April 2008. Upon release, the single reached #79 in the UK Singles Chart. During the intro riff/chorus there is a use of poly-meter, with the guitar playing in four bars of 3/4 and the drums playing in three bars of 4/4 respectively. The single artwork was designed by band-member Laura-Mary Carter.

== Track listing ==
=== 7" #1 ===
1. "Say Something, Say Anything"
2. "Waiting for Signs"

=== 7" #2 ===
1. "Say Something, Say Anything"
2. "Say Something, Say Anything" (Demo)

=== CD ===
1. "Say Something, Say Anything"
2. "Surf Song"
3. "Try Harder" (Live)

=== Download ===
1. "Say Something, Say Anything"
2. "Say Something, Say Anything" (Live)
