= You Bring Me Down =

2006 single by Blood Red Shoes

Single by Blood Red Shoes
- Released: 20 November 2006
- Genre: Alternative rock, garage rock
- Length: 3:42
- Songwriters: Laura-Mary Carter, Steven Ansell

Blood Red Shoes singles chronology
"A.D.H.D." (2006)	"You Bring Me Down" (2006)	"It's Getting Boring by the Sea" (2007)

"You Bring Me Down - (Reissue)"

Single by Blood Red Shoes
- Released: 4 February 2008
- Genre: Alternative rock, garage rock
- Length: 3:42
- Label: V2 Records
- Songwriters: Laura-Mary Carter, Steven Ansell

Blood Red Shoes singles chronology
"I Wish I Was Someone Better" (2007)	"You Bring Me Down - (Reissue)" (2008)	"Say Something, Say Anything" (2008)

"You Bring Me Down" is a 2006 single by the English alternative rock band, Blood Red Shoes. It was later re-recorded and re-issued by the band as their first CD release in early 2008. The limited-edition vinyl release was the version that was featured on the band's I'll Be Your Eyes compilation.

The re-issued version was their first release available on CD and download and became their first single to chart, peaking at #64 on the UK Singles Chart.

== Track listing (2006) ==
=== 7" ===
1. "You Bring Me Down"
2. "Try Harder"

== Track listing (2008) ==
=== 7" #1 ===
1. "You Bring Me Down"
2. "Can't Find The Door"

=== 7" #2 ===
1. "You Bring Me Down"
2. "How To Pass The Time"

=== CD ===
1. "You Bring Me Down"
2. "Twelve Hours Late"
3. "I Wish I Was Someone Better" (Metal On Metal Remix)

=== Download ===
1. "You Bring Me Down"
2. "You Bring Me Down" (Live)

== Charts ==
Chart (2006)	Peak Position
UK Singles (Official Charts Company)	169
Chart (2008)	Peak Position
UK Singles (Official Charts)	64
