= This Is Not for You =

"This Is Not For You"

Single by Blood Red Shoes
- Released: 7 July 2008
- Genre: Alternative rock, garage rock
- Length: 4:32
- Label: V2 Records

Blood Red Shoes singles chronology
"Say Something, Say Anything" (2008)	"This Is Not For You" (2008)	"Light It Up" (2010)

"This Is Not for You" is the ninth single released by English rock band Blood Red Shoes, and the fourth from their debut album, Box of Secrets. The song was released on vinyl only, unlike the previous two releases which had also been available on CD. Only 1,000 copies of the vinyl were released.

The titular song on the single release has a slightly shortened introduction; the full-length song can be heard on the album. The instrumental b-side was self-produced by the band.

== Track listing ==
=== 7" ===
1. "This Is Not for You" (Single edit)
2. "Carry Knots"
