= Cinnamon Toast Records =

Canadian record label

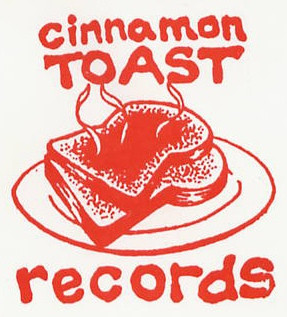
- Cinnamon Toast Records logo
- Founded: 1992
- Founder: Walter Forsythe; Lee Ann Gillan; Shawn Duggan; Colin MacKenzie; Robert Jeans; Miroslav Wiesner
- Country of origin: Canada
- Location: Halifax, Nova Scotia

Cinnamon Toast Records was a record label from Halifax, Nova Scotia. It was inspired by the American label Simple Machines and was run by Walter Forsyth, Lee Ann Gillan, Shawn Duggan, Colin MacKenzie, Robert Jeans and Miroslav Wiesner. Born out of an influx of local alternative music being created in Halifax during the early 1990s, Cinnamon Toast Records released a number of limited 7-inch singles, each in a different colour. Cinnamon Toast Records' first single was a 7-inch pressing of the Halifax band Bubaiskull in 1992. Other notable releases are the first Jale single and a split pressing of Sloan and Eric's Trip in 1993, a Rebecca West CD in 1995, as well as a number of full length Plumtree CDs.

== Halifax pop explosion ==
In the summer of 1993, the Halifax music scene had reached its “peak excitement.”. The city saw the launch of the weekly alternative arts and news publication, The Coast, providing a print platform and an accessible voice to the city's growing demographic of artists and performers. That summer there were more than thirty bands playing and competing for attention, compared to roughly ten bands the summer prior. The first Halifax Pop Explosion was held that September, and included a roster of bands on the Cinnamon Toast label, such as Jale, Plumtree, Strawberry, Eric's Trip, Bubiaskull, Thrush Hermit, Leonard Conan, Quahogs and Cheticamp as well as a number of acts associated to the Seattle based label, Sub Pop, including Velocity Girl and Sebadoh frontman Lou Barlow. Alternative super group Redd Kross also played the first annual year of the festival.

By the fall of 1994, Cinnamon Toast Records had released a wide array of singles, cassettes and other releases, Halifax Pop Explosion gained national notoriety, and its second annual lineup also included a variety of Sub Pop Records acts/bands such as, Sunny Day Real Estate, The Spinanes, Zumpano, and Six Finger Satellite. During that summer, Sub Pop had just released Eric's Trip's Gordon Street Haunting, a short EP that would bide time until their sophomore LP, Forever Again was released that fall. Jale's debut album Dreamcake would also be released on the label that year. Cinnamon Toast's Hardship Post would sign to Sub Pop during the 1994 Pop Explosion. All three of these bands had been releasing music on the local label, and within one year rose to the international stage with their respective signings to Sub Pop; “The trickle of scene releases had turned into a flood.” In a 1994 Much Music television special highlighting Halifax Pop Explosion 1994, members of the Toronto band Treble Charger can be quoted as saying “...if you can make it here (in Halifax) you can make it anywhere.”

In anticipation of the second Halifax Pop Explosion, Cinnamon Toast Records released their first compilation CD “Trim Crusts If Desired.” This CD featured fifteen tracks by eleven bands. Each track featured on the CD was a re-release from each of Cinnamon Toasts previous 7-inch releases, as well as one unreleased single and one track from the “Skreech '' flexi disc release. In 1995, this compilation was also released in an LP version as well as a cassette. The cover image of the compilation features an old fashioned toasting rack, “...one of those ones that held eight slices.” The inner sleeve of the CD included a listing of the band’s members, and featured illustrations depicting historical toasters. This CD release served the purpose of allowing a new generation of listeners to have access to these singles, as many younger fans did not own turntables to play 7-inches on. Capitalizing on the anticipation of the 1994 Halifax Pop Explosion, which had gained national recognition, allowed for the label to promote these local bands to a much wider, even global audience.

== Notable label productions ==
Cinnamon Toast Records became known in Halifax for mobilizing the local music scene. This included the release and promotion of local bands, but was not limited to that action. During the Halifax Pop Explosion music festival, the label held an annual brunch of cinnamon toast which accompanied shows at local cafes and venues. In the Much Music Canada coverage of Halifax Pop Explosion 1994, operators of the label can be seen serving plates of toast to the audience of the band Rebecca West at the restaurant Cafe Mokka. In addition to food and music the Cinnamon Toast Records' brunch featured the only act of protest against the 1995 Halifax Pop Explosion festival's sponsor, the Export A tobacco company. The label was widely known for their colourful 7-inch releases and widespread promotional materials of their artists. Much of the Cinnamon Toast Records promotional ephemera such as stickers and leaflets, posters and CD inserts featured personal language uncommon among larger labels. Cinnamon Toast Records followed a DIY approach, characteristic of local scene releases of the 1990s. Rob Benvie of Thrush Hermit is quoted in the Halifax Pop Explosion 1994 television special as saying

“...the important thing is not that... people from Geffen, or Capitol (records) are hanging around here, it's more important that Murderrecords, and Cinnamon Toast exists... Halifax is bound to self destruct once all this attention gets put on us, which it will.”

== Notable releases ==
Preceding the fall of 1994, when the Halifax Pop Explosion began to command national acclaim, Cinnamon Toast Records had released a small variety of 7-inch singles by Halifax bands. Notable bands signed to Cinnamon Toast Records include Jale, Thrush Hermit and The Quahogs. As well, Cinnamon Toast put out the music of bands in the Halifax scene known more for their live performances; such as Bubaiskull. Notable releases of the label include:

=== CT002: Jale, "Aunt Betty" 1992 ===
After forming a relationship during their studies at the Nova Scotia College of Art and Design University, Jale “...discovered they could all sing in key and harmonize, divided up who would play what, and Jale (an acronym of their first names) was born.” No member of the band had any previous musical experience except Jennifer, who sang on “Smeared”, the DGC record label debut by fellow Halifax band Sloan. Jale was not one, however, to simply revel in their charming lack of proficiency like so many other bands who float by on their good looks. They quickly became known as the hardest working band In Halifax, practicing sometimes seven nights a week and working days to pay off their equipment. This information comes from the label Sub Pop, who would eventually sign them to a contract after their initial success with Cinnamon Toast.

=== CT003: Quahogs, “Glaze” 1993 ===
Recorded by Terry Pulliam at Soundmarket Recording, the “Glaze” single is considered to be one of the “best Halifax singles of all time” by the Halifax newspaper The Coast. Quahogs guitarist Todd Calder describes the project:

“We saved the money we made from playing shows (mostly at the Double Deuce) and decided to record some songs. At some point the Cinnamon Toast people got in touch with us and asked if we'd put it out on their label. I think this was before the recording. They said, If you do the recording we'll do everything else including promotion.”

The release of the record was also performed at the Double Deuce venue. Calder describes the show;

“...I can't remember who we were playing with, but it was a good time. I remember that the Cinnamon Toast people were making cinnamon toast in the back of the bar and every time they pushed down the toaster the power went out. We didn't know what was going on for a while. It caused some chaos.”

The Coast also picked up on this technical glitch, citing it in their article on best Halifax singles as a key reason for their selection of this project for their list.

=== CT010: Eric's Trip / Sloan split single, 1993 ===
By far the best selling release of the Cinnamon Toast Label, this release attracted attention from UK based label Cargo Records which began a distribution relationship abroad. Colin Mackenzie, a founder of Cinnamon Toast recalls “The folks at Cargo records in the UK went nuts for it (and) ordered all sorts and we were stuck stuffing seven-inch singles late into the night…many, many nights.” Sloan frontman Chris Murphy describes the project as

“...a benefit for CKDU in Halifax. It was a co-production with Murder and Cinnamon Toast and Sappy and maybe even one more label. I forget now. Our version of ‘Smother’ was done with a drum loop that Jay made with reel-to-reel tape, which required that we hold a chopstick to keep it spinning. I think the drum loop was from the band Can. I don’t remember the song. I am happy this split seven-inch was made because Eric’s Trip is so legendary and great.”

This 7-inch featured each band covering one song of the other's catalogue. Eric's Trip covered Sloan's “Laying Blame” While Sloan covered the Eric's Trip song “Smother.”

=== CT015: Plumtree, “Water Had Leaked in my Suit” 1994, and CT017a/b: “Mass Teen Fainting” 1995. ===
Formed in 1993 when sisters Carla and Lynette Gillis met up with Amanda Braden, Plumtree quickly established themselves during their mid-teens as one of the most original young bands in Canada. With the addition of Nina Martin on bass, the band quickly developed a highly collaborative songwriting method which combined catchy melodies, a serious approach to writing music and solid instrumentation. Their first release on Cinnamon Toast was a split 7-inch with the Prince Edward Island-based band Strawberry (CT009) also in 1994. By the end of that year, Plumtree had released their debut record “Water Had Leaked in my Suit,” which debuted on the charts of the radio station CFRC-FM at number 2. The next week, the record reached the top of the CFRC-FM's chart where it stayed for four consecutive weeks. The band's debut album “Mass Teen Fainting” was recorded in Ottawa and released the following year, and they earned recognition from YTV network as the “Best Canadian Band Under 20” in 1996.

== Releases ==
All are 7" vinyl, except where noted.

CT001 Bubaiskull — Insex

CT002 - Jale — Aunt Betty

CT003 - Quahogs — Glaze EP

CT004 - Leonard Conan — Pub Slop

CT005 - Les Gluetones — Ugly FOURTYfive

CT006 - Thrush Hermit — Ammo

CT007 - Skreech — Skreech

CT007a - Skreech — Skreech

CT008 - Jale — Sort Of Grey (1st pressing/white vinyl)

CT009 - Plumtree / Strawberry - Green Mittens / Me split-release

CT010 - Sloan / Eric’s Trip — Eric’s Trip / Sloan split-release

CT011 - Randy Bachman / Hardship Post — That’s O.K. / Rock Is My Life split-release

CT-012 - Cheticamp - Coincidence

CT013A - Various — Trim Crusts If Desired (cass)

CT013B - Various — Trim Crusts If Desired (CD)

CT013C - Various — Trim Crusts If Desired (LP)

CT014A - Rebecca West — Burner’s On (cass)

CT014B - Rebecca West — Burner’s On (CD)

CT-014C - Rebecca West — Burner’s On (12” LP)

CT015 - Plumtree — Water Had Leaked Into My Suit

CT-016 - Furnaceface - Overcome

CT017 - Various - A Four Track Christmas (cass)

CT017A - Plumtree - Mass Teen Fainting (cass)

CT017B - Plumtree - Mass Teen Fainting (CD)

CT018 - Rebecca West - Six More Weeks Of Winter (CD)

CT020 - Plumtree — Plumtree Predicts The Future (CD)

CT-021 - Piggy - Calypsos To Please You

CT022 - Piggy — Don’t Stop The Calypso (CD)

CT022B - Urban Surf Kings — Get Instro-Mental! (CD)

CT023 - Urban Surf Kings — Play El Toro! And Other Favourites EP

CT024 - Piggy — Love Letter To Halifax (CD)

== Distributed Releases (CTD) ==
CTD01 - Horseshoes & Handgrenades — A Thousand Thousand Ways To Get Things Done (CD)

CTD02 - Leonard Conan — Bringin’ Home The Bacon Bits (cass)

CTD03 - Plumtree — Flutterboard EP (cass)

CTD04 - Suckerpunch — Carols… (12” LP)

== Promotional Releases (PRO) ==
PR001 - Various - Cinnamon Toast Sampler: Always Fresh, Never Stale (cass, promo)

== See also ==
- List of record labels
