= Stitch Me Back/Meet Me at Eight =

"Stitch Me Back / Meet Me at Eight"

Single by Blood Red Shoes
- Released: 20 February 2006
- Label: Try Harder Records

Blood Red Shoes singles chronology
"Victory for the Magpie" (2005)	"Stitch Me Back / Meet Me at Eight" (2006)	"A.D.H.D" (2006)

"Stitch Me Back" / "Meet Me at Eight" is the second release by the English band Blood Red Shoes, released on 20 February 2006 on the Try Harder label. The single was a double A-side release, however "Stitch Me Back" endured as the more prominent of the two songs, as it continued to be played live by the band during their album release tour in 2008.

== Critical reception ==
Colin Roberts of Drowned in Sound described "Stitch Me Back" as "essentially a three minute chorus that pounds and pounds until you're beaten into submission and the words 'stitch me back' are imprinted in the centre of your skull", calling it "a great, great song". A SoundsXP review called it "a loud and brutal snarl of spiky guitar pop". Mark Beaumont of NME suggested that "Stitch Me Back" when performed live sounded "like someone’s thrown a drumkit, 50 mallets and a naked and shaved bassist into a high security ward for psychopathic cannibals and recorded the result". Sam Shepherd of musicOMH was also impressed, stating "Stitch Me Back is hectic, it's shambolic and it is thoroughly exciting".

== Track listing ==
=== 7" ===
1. "Stitch Me Back"
2. "Meet Me At Eight"
