= ADHD (Joyner Lucas album) =

Studio album by Joyner Lucas
- Released: March 27, 2020
- Recorded: 2018–2020
- Genre: Hip-hop
- Length: 60:02
- Label: Twenty Nine; The Orchard
- Producer: Boi-1da; Bregma; Crank Lucas; CorMill; Darkboy Santana; DrtWork; Highself; Leo Son; Illmind; ISM; Jahaan Sweet; Mally Mall; NextLane Beats; Nick Papz; Nox Beats; Rocktee; Scorp Dezel; Sonorous; SoSpecial; TheSkyBeats; Timbaland; Xander

Joyner Lucas chronology
508-507-2209 (2017)	ADHD (2020)	Not Now, I'm Busy (2024)

Singles from ADHD
- 1. "I Love" Released: October 17, 2018; 2. "Devil's Work" Released: May 2, 2019; 3. "ISIS" Released: May 24, 2019; 4. "Broke and Stupid" Released: June 27, 2019; 5. "10 Bands" Released: July 11, 2019; 6. "ADHD" Released: September 12, 2019; 7. "Revenge" Released: February 3, 2020; 8. "Lotto" Released: March 12, 2020; 9. "Will" Released: March 25, 2020

Professional ratings
Review scores
Source	Rating
HipHopDX	2.8/5

ADHD is the debut studio album by American rapper Joyner Lucas. It was released on March 27, 2020, by his self-owned label, Twenty Nine Music Group. The album features four skits with music created for the album by Leo Son. The album features guest appearances by Logic, Young Thug, Chris Brown, Timbaland, Fabolous, and King OSF. Chris Tucker and Kevin Hart both appear on skits. Production was handled by Boi-1da, Timbaland, Highself, Jahaan Sweet, Illmind, Bregma among others. A sequel to the album, ADHD 2, was released on July 18, 2025.

== Background ==
The album was announced on October 12, 2018. Lucas has stated that his childhood diagnosis with attention deficit hyperactivity disorder was the inspiration for the album.

When I was a kid I was diagnosed with 'ADHD'.. they said I was aggressive, fidgety, hyperactive, impulsive, etc... they tried to put me on meds. Everyone around me including my own parents made me feel like I wasn’t normal. I had to constantly see a doctor who made me take tests and all that. They separated me from the regular kids in school and put me in these classes away from everyone [...] Creating music was and always has been my only therapy. It’s the only way I ever knew how to express myself. I was tired of being cut off every time I spoke or had an opinion.. I figured if I made music then you would have no choice but to listen to me and hear me out [...] The kid with 'ADHD' did it.

Lucas released the album's lead single, "I Love", on October 17, 2018. He continued to release singles from the album throughout 2019 and 2020. He unveiled the album's track listing on March 24, 2020.

== Commercial performance ==
ADHD debuted at number ten on the US Billboard 200 with 39,000 album-equivalent units, including 10,000 album sales in its first week. It is Lucas' first US top-10 album.

== Track listing ==
ADHD track listing
No.	Title	Writer(s)	Producer(s)	Length
1.	"Screening Evaluation (Skit)"	Gary Maurice Lucas Jr.; Leo Edward Son, Jr.	Leo Son	2:49
2.	"I Lied (Intro)"	Lucas; Nikolas Papamitrou; Jeremy Uribe; Donnell Stephens III; Dillan Bailard	Papamitrou; Bregma; Xander	4:11
3.	"ISIS" (featuring Logic)	Lucas; Sir Robert Hall II; Matthew Samuels; Brian Eisner; Joel Puente	NoxBeats; Boi-1da; Rocktee	3:56
4.	"The War" (featuring Young Thug)	Lucas; Jeffery Williams; Jamal Rashid; Oluwaseyi Agbeti	Mally Mall; Scorp Dezel	3:42
5.	"Chris (Skit)"	Lucas	Leo Son	0:58
6.	"I Love"	Lucas; Frederik Thrane	TheSkyBeats	3:30
7.	"Devil's Work"	Lucas; Bartosz Welka; Marcin Gerik; Bob Foster	SoSpecial	4:45
8.	"Lotto"	Lucas; Rashid; Ishmael Sadiq Montague	ISM; Mally Mall	3:50
9.	"Kevin (Skit)"	Lucas	Leo Son	0:54
10.	"Gold Mine"	Lucas; Corliss Waitman	CorMill	3:11
11.	"Finally" (featuring Chris Brown)	Lucas; Christopher Brown; Jahaan Sweet; Samuels; Ramon Ibanga, Jr.	Sweet; Boi-1da; Illmind	3:35
12.	"10 Bands" (featuring Timbaland)	Lucas; Timothy Mosley	Timbaland	3:34
13.	"Revenge"	Lucas; Samuels; Sweet; Kevin Deepnarine; Michał Suski	Boi-1da; Sweet; Sonorous; DrtWrk	4:29
14.	"Comprehensive Evaluation (Skit)"	Lucas	Leo Son	2:05
15.	"ADHD"	Lucas	Highself	3:25
16.	"Still Can't Love" (featuring Fabolous and King OSF)	Lucas; John Jackson; Bunyan Montiero	Darkboy Santana	3:57
17.	"Will"	Lucas; Kevin Lingham	Crank Lucas	3:21
18.	"Broke and Stupid"	Lucas; Don Blackman; Eisner; Frederik Gamst; Waitman	Nox Beats; NextLane Beats; CorMill	3:58
Total length:				60:02

== Charts ==
=== Weekly charts ===
Chart performance for ADHD
Chart (2020)	Peak position
Australian Albums (ARIA)	9
Austrian Albums (Ö3 Austria)	29
Belgian Albums (Ultratop Flanders)	25
Canadian Albums (Billboard)	9
Dutch Albums (Album Top 100)	43
Estonian Albums (Eesti Tipp-40)	28
French Albums (SNEP)	184
German Albums (Offizielle Top 100)	65
Irish Albums (OCC)	12
Lithuanian Albums (AGATA)	35
New Zealand Albums (RMNZ)	10
Norwegian Albums (VG-lista)	33
Scottish Albums (OCC)	40
Swiss Albums (Schweizer Hitparade)	23
UK Albums (OCC)	16
US Billboard 200	10
US Top R&B/Hip-Hop Albums (Billboard)	6

=== Year-end charts ===
Year-end chart performance for ADHD
Chart (2020)	Position
US Top R&B/Hip-Hop Albums (Billboard)	95

== Certifications ==
Region	Certification	Certified units/sales
United States (RIAA)	Gold	500,000^{‡}
^{‡} Sales+streaming figures based on certification alone.
