= I Love (Joyner Lucas song) =

Single by Joyner Lucas

from the album ADHD
- Released: October 17, 2018
- Genre: Hip hop
- Length: 3:30
- Label: Atlantic; Twenty Nine
- Songwriters: Gary Lucas, Jr.; Frederik Thrane
- Producer: TheSkyBeats

Joyner Lucas singles chronology
"I Don't Die" (2018)	"I Love" (2018)	"Lucky You" (2018)

Music video
- "I Love" on YouTube

"I Love" is a song by American rapper Joyner Lucas, released on October 17, 2018 alongside its music video. Written by Lucas and its producer TheSkyBeats, it served as the lead single of his debut studio album ADHD (2020).

== Background and composition ==
On October 17, 2018, Joyner Lucas premiered the song on Zane Lowe's Beats 1 show. On an "up-tempo instrumental", Lucas raps that he is not a person to be messed with on the track.

== Charts ==
Chart (2018)	Peak position
Canada Hot 100 (Billboard)	77
Ireland (IRMA)	78
New Zealand Hot Singles (RMNZ)	15
Romania (Airplay 100)	88
US Bubbling Under Hot 100 (Billboard)	10
US Bubbling Under R&B/Hip-Hop Singles (Billboard)	7

== Certifications ==
Region	Certification	Certified units/sales
New Zealand (RMNZ)	Gold	15,000^{‡}
United States (RIAA)	Platinum	1,000,000^{‡}
^{‡} Sales+streaming figures based on certification alone.
