= Blood Red Shoes =

English alternative rock band

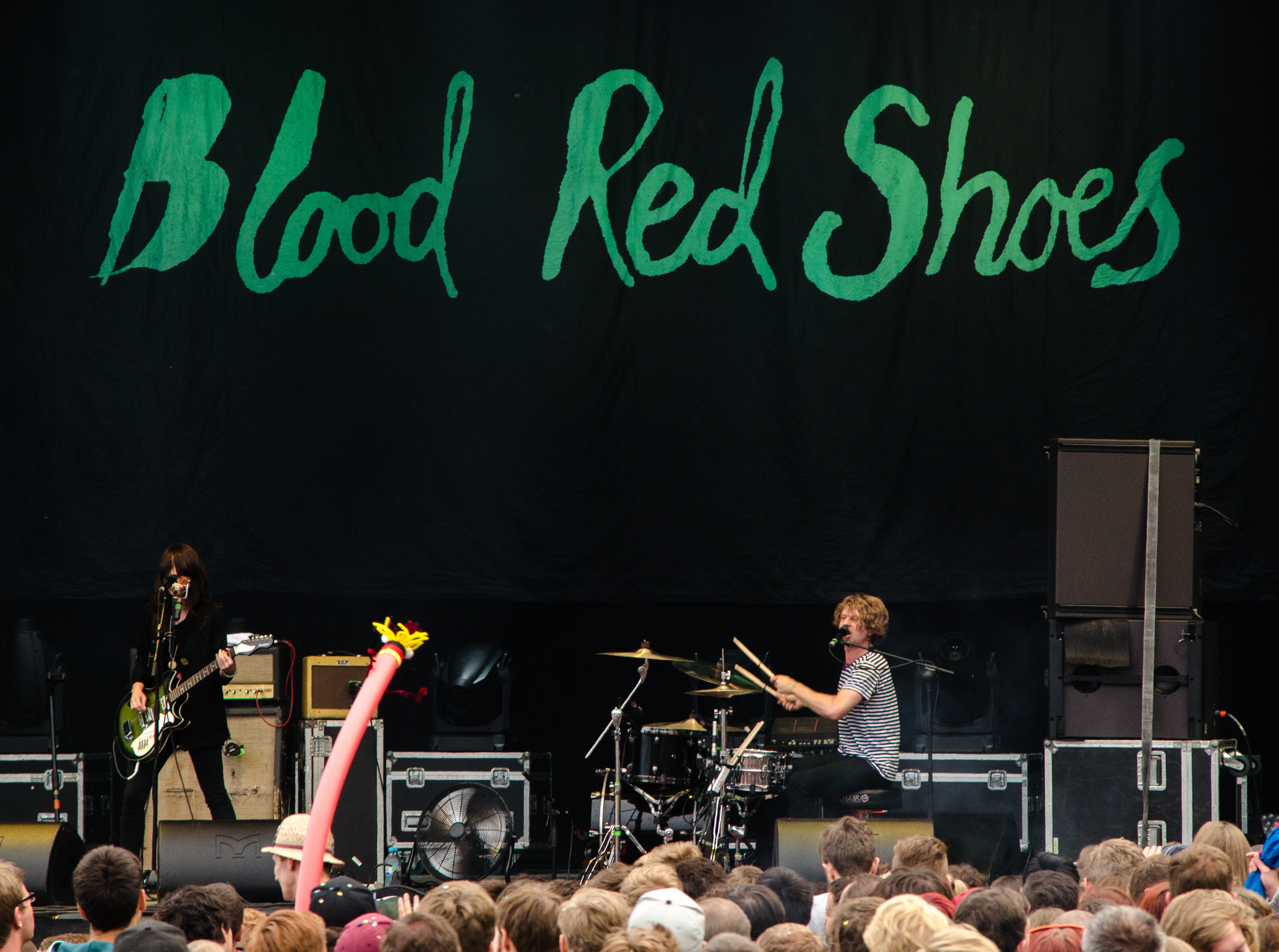

Background information
- Origin: Brighton, England
- Genres: Alternative rock; indie rock; garage rock; noise pop
- Years active: 2004–present
- Labels: V2 Cooperative Music, Jazz Life
- Members: Laura-Mary Carter; Steven Ansell

Blood Red Shoes are an English alternative rock duo from Brighton consisting of Laura-Mary Carter and Steven Ansell. They have released six full-length albums, Box of Secrets (2008), Fire Like This (2010), In Time to Voices (2012), Blood Red Shoes (2014), Get Tragic (2019), Ghosts on Tape (2022) and Stay Lonely (2026) as well as several EPs and a number of singles. In 2014, they founded their own label, Jazz Life.

== Overview ==
=== Formation and early singles ===
Blood Red Shoes emerged in late 2004 following the disbandment of Steven Ansell's Cat on Form and Laura-Mary Carter's Lady Muck. In an interview, Carter revealed that the band's name was inspired by a Ginger Rogers and Fred Astaire musical, in which Rogers famously bled into her white dancing shoes during intense rehearsals.

Blood Red Shoes released their debut single, “Victory for the Magpie”, on 18 July 2005. The following year in 2006, the duo released a string of 7" records through various independent labels. The singles included “Stitch Me Back / Meet Me at Eight”, released on 20 February 2006 via Try Harder Records, “A.D.H.D / Can't Find the Door”, released on 29 May 2006 via Try Harder Records, and “You Bring Me Down / Try Harder”, issued on 20 November 2006 by XL Recordings and Drowned in Sound. After performing more than 300 live shows across the United Kingdom, they signed with V2 Records where they released the singles “It’s Getting Boring by the Sea” on 11 June 2007, and “I Wish I Was Someone Better” on 29 October 2007. The duo also released a singles compilation album titled I’ll Be Your Eyes, issued on 22 June 2007 by Abeano/XL Recordings and Drowned in Sound.

The band featured on both days of the 2007 Camden Crawl, playing the Purple Turtle and the Earl of Camden respectively, and were one of four bands to play the NME New Music Tour 2007, with the Little Ones, Pull Tiger Tail and the Rumble Strips. The summer of 2007 saw the band playing several festival spots, including T in the Park, the inaugural Underage Festival, and the Electric Gardens festival. They also supported a wide range of bands, such as Biffy Clyro and Maxïmo Park.

=== Box of Secrets ===
Following the sale of V2 to Universal Music Group, the band's debut album Box of Secrets was released on Mercury Records/Universal on 14 April 2008. It was leaked to private torrent trackers in November 2007, several months before its retail release date. The band have commented that although they have no issue with file sharing and downloading free music, having their debut album become available outside of their control and without the intended artwork and lyric booklet was a disappointment. Laura-Mary Carter from the band has designed the record sleeve for every release by the band.

They played a nine-date tour of the UK, in support of the album, followed by dates across mainland Europe and Japan. They played major international festivals including Glastonbury festival, Reading and Leeds, Summer Sonic, Pukkelpop, Lowlands and Melt!.

=== Fire Like This ===
After their autumn-winter tour of 2008, which covered over 12 countries, the band took a performance stop in the first months of 2009 to write songs for their next record. They began touring again in March 2009, introducing new songs at every gig, sometimes including unfinished songs or those without lyrics. They opened for Foals in Brighton in 2009 to road-test some new material by playing all new songs except for "It's Getting Boring by the Sea" and "This Is Not For You". On 17 May 2009, the band played All Tomorrow's Parties (ATP festival), having been invited to play by the Breeders. The band recorded their second album with Mike Crossey at the Motor Museum recording studio in Liverpool. They also contributed an instrumental track called "Carry Knots" on a compilation CD for Audioscope, in aid of the homeless charity Shelter, which was released in October 2009.

On 25 November 2009, the band made a new track, "Colours Fade", available to download from their website. Independent music webzine The Music Magazine commented that the band's sound had been boosted. Author Jamie Smith wrote: "It takes the tried and tested BRS formula and as they say, turns it up to eleven. It’s seven minutes long. It pretty much defines epic. It sounds HUGE."

The album's first single "Light It Up" premiered on 5 January 2010 on Radio 1 by Huw Stephens filling in for Zane Lowe. The single was released on 22 February, one week before the release of their second album Fire Like This on 1 March 2010. Further singles "Don't Ask" and "Heartsink" were released in May and August respectively, which was followed by a European and North American tour in October. In September 2010, the band recorded a few new songs which they hope to release as an EP.

In 2010, the band's song "It's Getting Boring by the Sea" featured in the film Scott Pilgrim vs. the World. It is included on the film's official soundtrack and the band also attended the film's UK premiere in London. Director Edgar Wright is a fan of the band and decided to include it after seeing them live. The same song was also featured in an episode of Misfits, plus later in 2010 the song "When We Wake" was used in the TV show Huge and "Colours Fade" was used in CSI: NY in Season 8.

=== In Time To Voices ===
The band spent most of 2011 writing new songs. After spending the summer playing various festivals, they played their last show of 2011 on 17 September and began recording the album a few weeks later at The Motor Museum studio in Liverpool, again with Mike Crossey, who also produced Box of Secrets and Fire Like This. Recording started on 18 October 2011. On 12 December 2011, the band revealed the first teaser from the album on their website, with a video from the studio, with 3 more videos to be revealed before the album's release. During early January 2012, the band recorded b-sides, bonus tracks and alternate versions of songs for the album's release.

On 24 January 2012, the band's new single, "Cold" was premiered on BBC Radio 1 by Zane Lowe and their third album, In Time to Voices, was officially announced with a release date of 26 March 2012. The album's first single, "Cold", was released on 19 March.

In a press release, Carter described the album: ”With this album we totally threw out the rulebook of how we write and record. We decided we wanted to make a really ambitious record, not something which reflects our live show but something which is only limited by our imaginations and not by how many instruments we use onstage. We figured the best way to push ourselves forward was to write the best possible songs and melodies we could – once you have that as your foundation, you have the freedom to go anywhere with the sounds you use. We feel like a totally different band now.”

The band toured worldwide in support of the album and released it via Downtown Records in North America in July 2012.

An EP of new songs, entitled Water, was released on 21 January 2013 as a follow-up to In Time to Voices. It was released on limited edition red 10" vinyl and download and was recorded and produced by John Congleton during the band's USA leg of the tour.

=== Blood Red Shoes (self-titled album) ===
They released a new single from the album, "The Perfect Mess" on 1 December 2013. The first single was release via a system where 10 QR codes were hidden in 10 cities across the world, and only once all 10 codes had been found and scanned, the song was released online. Their website subsequently crashed from demand. Two days later, the band released the details of their fourth, self-titled album. Recorded over a 6-month period in Berlin, the album was entirely self-produced and engineered by the band themselves. The album was released on 3 March 2014 on CD and vinyl. The special edition includes a live album entitled 14 Photographs, with recordings taken from the band's European tour in late 2012.

=== Get Tragic ===
After an extensive touring schedule to support their fourth album, the band began writing new songs during Summer 2015. The band released a digital-only album of rarities called Tied at the Wrist on 27 November 2015. The compilation features ten songs from the first three years of the band, remixed and remastered from the original analogue tapes. This is intended as a lowkey stopgap release between the self-titled album and the band's fifth studio album, which is being written and recorded in Los Angeles during Winter 2015/16.

The band continued working on their fifth album during the remainder of 2016, while maintaining their label Jazz Life, releasing music by Tigercub, Raketkanon, MarthaGunn, Abattoir Blues and Our Girl. Carter started a side-project called Shit Girlfriend with Natalie Chahal and performed a series of solo shows. Shit Girlfriend released their debut single "Mummy's Boy" on Jazz Life on Valentine's Day 2017. In April 2017, the band announced that their first single in over two years "Eye To Eye" would be premiered on Zane Lowe's Beats 1 radio show. The song was released as a single immediately thereafter. On 19 May, they released a second single from their forthcoming album, "Bangsar", a day before their headline set at The Great Escape festival. The set was played in chronological order, with the new songs placed at the end, and was livestreamed on the band's Facebook page. For the new songs, the longtime duo were accompanied by members of Tigercub and electronic producer Clarence Clarity, marking a shift in approach.

In April 2018 the band released their first new single in nearly a year, "God Complex", followed by "Call Me Up Victoria" in July. In September 2018, Blood Red Shoes announced their forthcoming fifth album would be called Get Tragic and would be released on their label Jazz Life on 25 January 2019. They released a third single, "Mexican Dress", along with a full track list and hinted at the difficulties they experienced around the 5th album. The album was made in Los Angeles and produced by Nick Launay and Adam Greenspan (Arcade Fire, Nick Cave, Yeah Yeah Yeahs).

=== Ghosts On Tape ===
Immediately after the release of Get Tragic, the band started working on songs for another album. Despite the album being finished at the beginning of 2020, they decided to postpone its release due to restrictions associated with the global COVID-19 pandemic. Instead, they wrote six more songs which were released on the Ø EP on 18 June 2021. During that time, Carter and Carré Callaway started hosting a podcast, Never Meet Your Idols, interviewing other artists, while Ansell collaborated with other British musicians such as The Xcerts, Aiko, ARXX or Circe.

On 14 January 2022, the band's sixth studio album Ghosts on Tape was released via their own label Jazz Life. It was produced by Tom Dalgety and features a dark, synth-oriented sound, the band's members citing Depeche Mode and Tears for Fears as its main influences. It was supported by a tour in Europe in the summer and North America in autumn 2022.

=== 20th Anniversary ===
In September 2024, the band performs four event concerts to celebrate the band's twentieth year of activity. On this celebratory tour the duo is joined by Daniel Rumsey, The Wytches bassist, and James Allix, Tigercub drummer.

== Laura-Mary Carter solo project ==
In October 2021, Laura-Mary Carter announced her debut solo project was to be a mini-album called Town Called Nothing due out on 3 December 2021. The album's title track was produced by Ed Harcourt (who also plays bass and piano), with the song receiving airplay on BBC 6 Music.

== Musical style ==
Blood Red Shoes are labelled under genres such as alternative rock, indie rock, garage rock, and noise pop. According to their AllMusic biography, the band includes influences from punk rock and shoegazing.

== Line-up ==
In Autumn 2019, during the European tour, Savages bassist Ayse Hassan played in the band.

== Discography ==
=== Studio albums ===
| Title | Details | Peak chart positions | | | | | | | |
| Title | Details | UK | UK Indie | UK Rock | BEL (FL) | BEL (WA) | GER | NLD | SCO |
|---|---|---|---|---|---|---|---|---|---|
| Box of Secrets | Released: 14 April 2008; Label: Mercury | 47 | — | — | 58 | — | — | 73 | 62 |
| Fire like This | Released: 1 March 2010; Label: V2 | 95 | — | — | 42 | — | — | 48 | — |
| In Time to Voices | Released: 26 March 2012; Label: V2 | 61 | — | 5 | 63 | — | 75 | 78 | 83 |
| Blood Red Shoes | Released: 3 March 2014; Label: Jazz Life | 49 | 8 | — | 74 | 111 | 47 | 69 | 81 |
| Get Tragic | Released: 25 January 2019; Label: Jazz Life | 58 | 3 | — | 117 | — | 60 | — (Note: Get Tragic did not enter the Dutch Album Top 100, but peaked at number 15 on the Dutch Vinyl Albums Chart.) | 57 |
| Ghosts on Tape | Released: 14 January 2022; Label: Jazz Life | — (Note: Ghosts on Tape did not enter the UK Albums Chart, but peaked at number 30 on the UK Album Sales Chart Top 100.) | 9 | — | — | — | — | — | 95 |
| Stay Lonely | Released: 18 September 2026; Label: Jazz Life | — (Note: Stay Lonely did not enter the UK Albums Chart, but peaked at number 91 on the UK Album Downloads Chart Top 100.) | — | — | — | — | — | — | — |
"—" denotes a recording that did not chart.

=== Other Albums ===
- Live Online (6 November 2020), stripped down live album originally broadcast as a livestream during Covid-19 lockdown
- THE STONE TAPES (14 September 2023), featuring collaborations with Liars, Demob Happy, DZ Deathrays
- 20 Years Of Blood Red Shoes: Live In Paris (10 January 2024), live album recorded at La Gaîté Lyrique, Paris, France.

=== Extended plays ===
- Water (21 January 2013)
- Ø (18 June 2021)

=== Singles ===
| Single | Year | Peak chart positions | | | Album |
| Single | Year | UK | UK Indie | SCO | Album |
|---|---|---|---|---|---|
| "Victory for the Magpie" | 2005 | — | — | — | Non-album singles |
| "Stitch Me Back / Meet Me at Eight" | 2006 | — | — | — | Non-album singles |
| "ADHD / Can't Find the Door" | 2006 | — | — | — | Non-album singles |
| "You Bring Me Down / Try Harder" | 2006 | 169 | 12 | — | I'll Be Your Eyes |
| "It's Getting Boring by the Sea" | 2007 | — | — | — | I'll Be Your Eyes |
| "I Wish I Was Someone Better" | 2007 | 186 | — | 51 | Box of Secrets |
| "You Bring Me Down" (re-release) | 2008 | 64 | — | 27 | Box of Secrets |
| "Say Something, Say Anything" | 2008 | 79 | — | 26 | Box of Secrets |
| "This Is Not for You" | 2008 | — (Note: "This Is Not for You" did not enter the UK Singles Chart, but peaked at number 44 on the UK Physical Singles Chart Top 100.) | — | 44 | Box of Secrets |
| "Light It Up" | 2010 | — (Note: "Light It Up" did not enter the UK Singles Chart, but peaked at number 22 on the UK Physical Singles Chart Top 100.) | — | — | Fire Like This |
| "Don't Ask / We Get Bored" | 2010 | — (Note: "Don't Ask" did not enter the UK Singles Chart, but peaked at number 33 on the UK Physical Singles Chart Top 100.) | — | — | Fire Like This |
| "Heartsink / Into the Night" | 2010 | — (Note: "Heartsink" did not enter the UK Singles Chart, but peaked at number 18 on the UK Physical Singles Chart Top 100.) | — | — | Fire Like This |
| "Cold" | 2012 | — (Note: "Cold" did not enter the UK Singles Chart, but peaked at number 21 on the UK Physical Singles Chart Top 100.) | — | — | In Time To Voices |
| "In Time To Voices" | 2012 | — | — | — | In Time To Voices |
| "The Perfect Mess" | 2014 | — | — | — | Blood Red Shoes |
| "An Animal" | 2014 | — (Note: "An Animal" did not enter the UK Singles Chart, but peaked at number 16 on the UK Physical Singles Chart.) | — | — | Blood Red Shoes |
| "Speech Coma" | 2014 | — | — | — | Blood Red Shoes |
| "Eye To Eye" | 2017 | — | — | — | Get Tragic |
| "Bangsar" | 2017 | — | — | — | Get Tragic |
| "God Complex" | 2018 | — | — | — | Non-album singles |
| "Call Me Up Victoria" | 2018 | — | — | — | Non-album singles |
| "Mexican Dress" | 2018 | — | — | — | Get Tragic |
| "Howl" | 2018 | — | — | — | Get Tragic |
| "Find My Own Remorse" | 2018 | — | — | — | Get Tragic |
| "Morbid Fascination" | 2021 | — | — | — | Ghosts on Tape |
| "I Am Not You" | 2021 | — | — | — | Ghosts on Tape |
| "Murder Me" | 2022 | — | — | — | Ghosts on Tape |
"—" denotes singles that did not chart, have not charted yet, or were not released.

=== Compilations ===
- I'll Be Your Eyes – (V2 Records) 25 June 2007
- Tied at the Wrist – (Jazz Life) 26 November 2015

=== Other appearances ===
- The Gaslight Anthem – Halloween (fan-only 7") – Laura-Mary Carter sings guest vocals
- 1984, "Influenza" (album) – January 2013 – produced by Steven Ansell and Laura-Mary Carter
- Us Baby Bear Bones, "Usari" EP – May 2014 – produced by Steven Ansell
- Thumpers "Together" EP – 9 November 2014 – Laura-Mary Carter sings guest vocals on Parachute
