= Catriona Sturton =

Canadian blues and indie rock musician (born 1976)

- Born: June 8, 1976 (age 50)
- Origin: Ottawa, Ontario, Canada
- Genres: Indie rock, J-Pop, folk, blues
- Occupation: Singer-songwriter
- Instruments: Vocals, guitar, harmonica, shamisen, accordion
- Member of: Ginny
- Formerly of: Plumtree
- Website: http://catrionasturton.com/

Catriona Sturton (born June 8, 1976) is an Ottawa, Ontario–based singer, songwriter and multi-instrumentalist. She has had a prolific career, performing in bands such as Plumtree and collaborating with artists like Joel Plaskett, Al Tuck, the late Dutchy Mason, the Mighty Popo and members of Sloan and Blue Rodeo.

== History ==
Sturton got her start at an early age when her parents put her into classical violin lessons for eight years. In her teens, while shopping for some fiddle music, she saw a harmonica and bought it. This led to a passion for the Blues, and she quickly acquired proficiency with the instrument. Her adolescence was spent under the tutelage of local Ottawa harp legend Larry "The Bird" Mootham and performing in and around Ottawa at various blues bars such as The Whipping Post, The Rainbow, and Tucson's.

As a young adult Sturton left Ottawa to study History at Dalhousie University, in Halifax, Nova Scotia. While there she learned to play the bass guitar and joined the indie all-female band Plumtree. With the band she released and recorded two albums, won a YTV Achievement Award and toured extensively around Canada with others, like Thrush Hermit and the Weakerthans. Plumtree also inspired the comic series entitled Scott Pilgrim, named after their hit song. She claims that she used the experience to cut her teeth on the rigours of songwriting, traveling, marketing and other aspects of being a touring musician.

In 2000, Sturton moved to Japan to teach English. While there she met Sonnet Bingham from Arizona. Together with two locals they started The Secret, a bilingual J-Pop influenced Garage band, and toured Japan and Canada. The experience gave Sturton the confidence to write and sing her own songs. During her time in Japan she was greatly influenced by the shamisen.

=== Current musical projects ===
The first instrument Sturton studied seriously was the harmonica. During her teen years, she wanted to be a professional blues harp player and since then, has studied with Larry "The Bird" Mootham and Cuban-Canadian harmonica virtuoso Carlos del Junco. In 2013, Sturton quit her job with a non-profit literary foundation that required her to travel across Canada to focus on her solo music career and follow her passion for playing harmonica. To date she has performed on stage with Neko Case, Dutch Mason and Paul Oscher, and performs regularly with Ottawa blues singer and guitarist John Carroll. In addition to performing, Sturton frequently gives harmonica workshops and has also created instructional videos aimed at audiences curious about playing harmonica.

== Selected discography ==
- 2024: Night Bell - JMI Recordings
- 2006: Catriona Sturton and The Screaming Elks – Catriona Sturton and The Screaming Elks Demo (vocals, guitar, harmonica, songwriting) – Modern Soul Records
- 2006: Digger – (vocals, guitar, harmonica) Ladyfest Ottawa 2006 Compilation
- 2003: The Secret – Himitsu EP – (vocals, guitar) Himitsu records 002 – Japan
- 2001: Chikusen and Soken Danjo – Nembutsu – (chorus vocals on CD of healing music for hospice patients) Aikoto 05 Japan
- 2001: Al Tuck – (bass, harmonica) The New High Road of Song – Brobdingnagian Records
- 2000: Plumtree – (bass, harmonica, backup vocals, songwriting) This Day Won't Last at All – Endearing Records
- 1999: I Love You When You're Walking Away (with Plumtree) – Moshi Moshi: Pop International Style (Compilation) – March Records
- 1998: Plumtree – Predicts the Future (bass, backup vocals) – Cinnamon Toast Records
- 1996: Scott Pilgrim (with Plumtree/The Inbreds) – North Window Split 7" – PF Records

== See also ==
- Plumtree (band)
- Scott Pilgrim
