= ADHD (Blood Red Shoes song) =

Single by Blood Red Shoes
- Released: 15 May 2006
- Label: Try Harder Records

Blood Red Shoes singles chronology
"Stitch Me Back/Meet Me at Eight" (2006)	"ADHD" (2006)	"You Bring Me Down" (2006)

"ADHD" is a 2006 single by Blood Red Shoes, and was the first to feature an accompanying video featuring the band. Both the A-side and the B-side tracks continued to be played live by the band as late as 2008. As with their previous singles, the release was a limited edition vinyl only. "ADHD" was regularly used by the band to close their live shows, becoming a common encore song due to calls from the audience.

Drowned in Sound rated the single 9/10, describing it as "one of the brashest and best singles of two-zero-zero-six thus far", while musicOMH called it "a marvellous bloody, pop punk death frenzy".

== Track listing ==
=== 7" ===
1. "ADHD"
2. "Can't Find The Door"
