= It's Getting Boring by the Sea =

Single by Blood Red Shoes
- Released: 4 June 2007
- Genre: Punk rock, alternative rock
- Length: 2:56
- Label: V2 Records
- Songwriter(s): Laura-Mary Carter, Steven Ansell

Blood Red Shoes singles chronology
"You Bring Me Down" (2006)	"It's Getting Boring by the Sea" (2007)	"I Wish I Was Someone Better" (2007)

"It's Getting Boring by the Sea" is a single by the English band Blood Red Shoes released on 4 June 2007. The B-side's title was eventually used as the title for the band's debut album, released in 2008. The single was favourably received, getting an 8/10 rating from Drowned in Sound. "It's Getting Boring by the Sea" was described by Gigwise.com as "a homage to the band's love-hate relationship with Brighton". The NME described the lead track: "The small-town rage of ‘It’s Getting Boring By The Sea’ hurtles along like a renegade V2-rocket on an unstoppable arc that ends at Brighton Pier". The song was also featured in the Scott Pilgrim vs. the World movie soundtrack and Series 3 of the UK TV show Misfits, as well as the 2016 French-Belgian film Raw.

== Track listing ==
=== 7" ===
1. "It's Getting Boring by the Sea"
2. "Box of Secrets"
