= ADHD (Joyner Lucas song) =

2019 single by Joyner Lucas

Single by Joyner Lucas

from the album ADHD
- Released: September 12, 2019
- Genre: Conscious hip hop
- Length: 3:25
- Label: Twenty Nine
- Songwriter: Gary Lucas Jr.
- Producer: Highself

Joyner Lucas singles chronology
"10 Bands" (2019)	"ADHD" (2019)	"Revenge" (2020)

Music video
- "ADHD with Revenge Intro" on YouTube

"ADHD" is a song by American rapper Joyner Lucas, released on September 12, 2019 as the sixth single from his debut studio album of the same name (2020). It was produced by Highself. The music video was directed by Ben Proux and featured assistance from Jack Dawson.

== Content ==
The song finds Joyner Lucas detailing his internal struggles as a person with attention deficit hyperactivity disorder. and his refusal to medicate for his condition.

== Music video ==
In an interview with Rolling Stone, Joyner Lucas revealed details behind the filming of the music video:

I shot the video in Massachusetts at a huge warehouse building. I had the idea to be in multiple places at one time to mimic how my brain works. When I was younger my mind was all over the place. When I grew up I learned how to contain it but still find myself wandering off. I wanted to create a visual of what that may look like. If you pay attention you can see the video is filled with tons of people pressuring me to take prescription pills as I refused. In the end, I ended up taking the pill and falling asleep. My director Ben Proulx and our film company Project 2 really helped put it together. This video was shot in one take behind a green screen and a motion track that followed me in circles. I always wanted to do a one-take music video and this was the perfect opportunity.

The video was released on December 13, 2019 and includes a preview of Lucas's song "Revenge" in the beginning. As "ADHD" begins playing, Lucas wakes up for a day. He is shown engaging in daily activities that happen in various locations, such as going to school, eating dinner, going to the library, the hospital, playing basketball, and grocery shopping, which are challenged by his pressure to treat his ADHD with pills. He finds respite in performing at a concert near the end of the clip. In the end, he reluctantly takes his medication before going to sleep.

== Charts ==
Chart (2019)	Peak position
New Zealand Hot Singles (RMNZ)	17

== Certifications ==
Region	Certification	Certified units/sales
New Zealand (RMNZ)	Gold	15,000^{‡}
United States (RIAA)	Gold	500,000^{‡}
^{‡} Sales+streaming figures based on certification alone.
