= Charles Spearin =

Canadian multi-instrumentalist

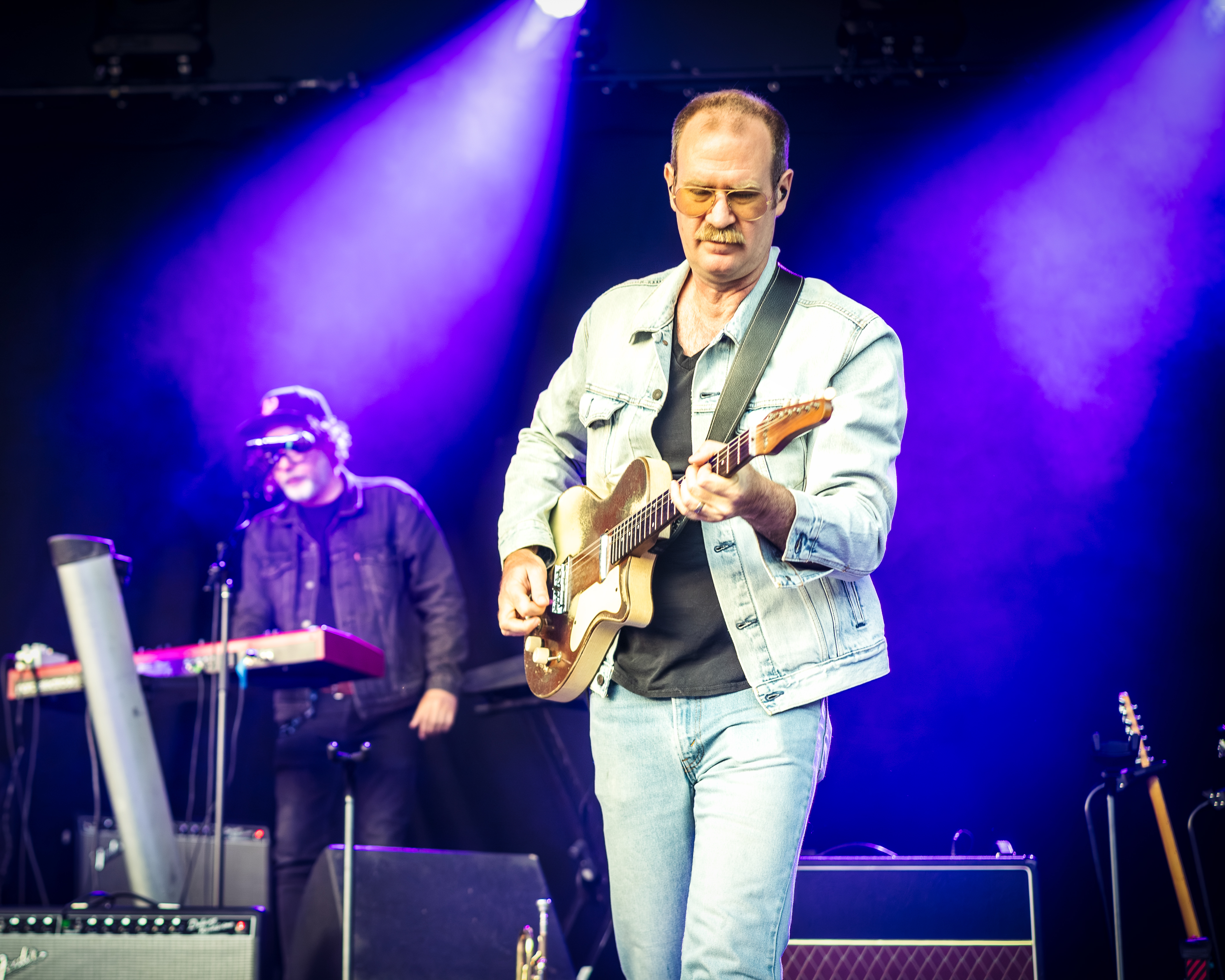
- Spearin at Ottawa Jazz Festival in 2025

Background information
- Origin: Toronto, Ontario, Canada
- Genres: Alternative, post-rock, instrumental, contemporary jazz, classical, punk, indie rock
- Occupations: Musical artist, Composer
- Years active: 1990–present
- Labels: Arts & Crafts, Constellation, Noise Factory

Charles Spearin is a Canadian multi-instrumentalist from Toronto, Ontario. He is primarily known as a founding member of indie rock bands Do Make Say Think and Broken Social Scene.

== Career ==
As a teen, Spearin studied at Etobicoke School of the Arts, a music-oriented high school. In the mid-1990s, he studied audio engineering at the Harris Institute for the Arts. During this time, he became friends with Kevin Drew over a mutual admiration of the post-rock band Tortoise. For a short time, they played in a band called Djula, but grew dissatisfied with performing. In 1998, they released their first album under the name KC Accidental. This collaboration grew to include many musicians who went on to form Broken Social Scene.

In 2002, Spearin teamed with members of Broken Social Scene, Godspeed You! Black Emperor, Silver Mt. Zion, Do Make Say Think, Shalabi Effect, and Strawberry, to make the supergroup Valley of the Giants. This project resulted in a self-titled album, released in 2004.

In addition to his collaborative work, Spearin has toured extensively as a part of Feist's band. He played bass for Gord Downie's Secret Path album and subsequent tour.

Spearin's debut solo album, The Happiness Project, was released on February 14, 2009, on the Arts & Crafts label. This album includes contributions from Do Make Say Think alumni Julie Penner, Kevin Drew, Ohad Benchetrit, and Broken Social Scene alumni Leon Kingstone and Evan Cranley. The concept for The Happiness Project, making music out of ordinary speech, is influenced by his early life with a blind father and his own Buddhist studies. On April 17, 2010, Spearin won a Juno Award for Best Contemporary Jazz Album for The Happiness Project.

On August 28, 2020, Spearin and Swedish violinist Josefin Runsteen released Thank God the Plague is Over. The album, titled just before the COVID-19 pandemic began, is a series of classical improvisations, featuring Runsteen on violin and Spearin on nyckelharpa. Spearin and Runsteen recorded this album in the Chiesa di San Vigilio, near Castel Campo, which experienced two waves of the Black Death that killed ninety percent of the local villagers. The title of the album is inspired by the interior walls of the chapel, which are covered in medieval graffiti pleading with God to rescue victims from the horrors of the disease. The most prominent graphic, a red X painted sometime after the end of the Plague, supposedly represents the cessation of suffering.

Spearin has achieved seven Juno Awards from his various collaborations, including Alternative Album of the Year 2003 (Broken Social Scene, You Forgot it in People), Alternative Album of the Year 2006 (Broken Social Scene, Broken Social Scene), Recording Package of the Year 2011 (Broken Social Scene, Forgiveness Rock Record), Adult Alternative Album of the Year 2017 (Gord Downie, Secret Path), and Instrumental Album of the Year 2018 (Do Make Say Think, Stubborn Persistent Illusions).

Spearin lives with his wife and children in the Toronto neighbourhood of Seaton Village, the inspiration for The Happiness Project.

== Discography ==
=== Solo ===
- The Happiness Project (2009)
- Thank God the Plague Is Over (2020), with Josefin Runsteen
- My City of Starlings (2021)

=== With Do Make Say Think ===
- Do Make Say Think (1999)
- Besides (EP) (1999)
- Goodbye Enemy Airship the Landlord Is Dead (2000)
- & Yet & Yet (2002)
- Winter Hymn Country Hymn Secret Hymn (2003)
- You, You're a History in Rust (2007)
- Other Truths (2009)
- Stubborn Persistent Illusions (2017)

=== With Broken Social Scene ===
- Feel Good Lost (2001)
- You Forgot It in People (2002)
- Bee Hives (2004)
- Broken Social Scene (2005)
- EP to Be You and Me (2005)
- Forgiveness Rock Record (2010)
- Lo-Fi for the Dividing Nights (2010)
- Hug of Thunder (2017)
- Let's Try the After (Vol. 1) & 2 (2019)

=== With K.C. Accidental ===
- Captured Anthems for an Empty Bathtub (1998)
- Anthems for the Could've Bin Pills (2000)

=== With Valley of the Giants ===
- Valley of the Giants (2004)

=== With Gord Downie ===
- Secret Path (2013)
