= Chinatown, Toronto =

Chinatown, Toronto 多倫多華埠 (Note: The neighbourhood is referred to by various names in Chinese. The Toronto Chinatown Business Improvement Area refers to the neighbourhood as 華埠, while 中區 and 唐人街 are also commonly used. These terms are broadly applied to describe Chinatowns around the world in the Chinese language.)
- Neighbourhood
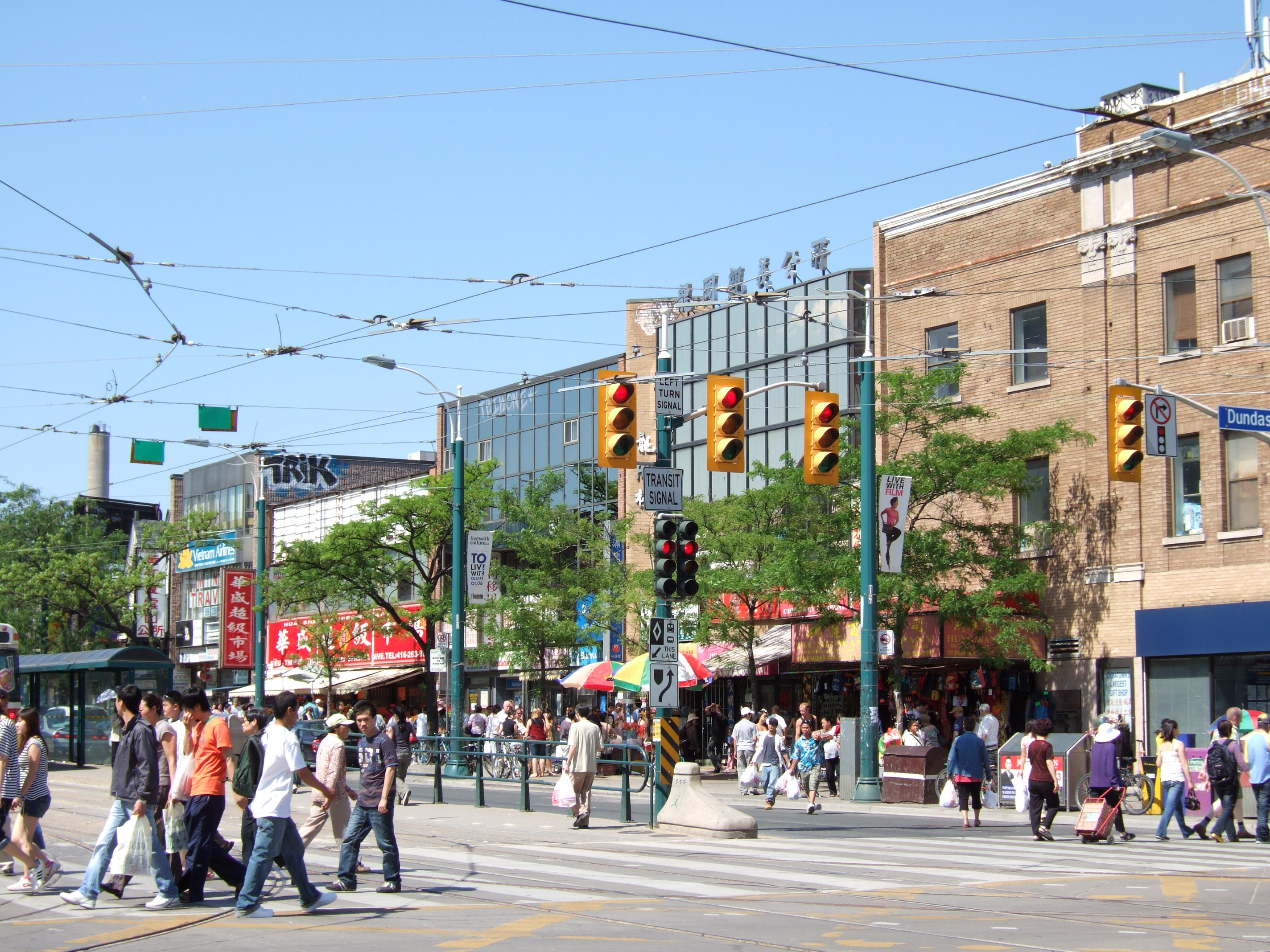
- Street level "downtown" Chinatown at the intersection of Dundas Street and Spadina Avenue

- Location within Toronto
- Coordinates: 43.6529°N 79.3980°W
- Country: Canada
- Province: Ontario
- City: Toronto

Chinatown, Toronto (also known as Downtown Chinatown or West Chinatown) is a Chinese ethnic enclave located in the city's downtown core of Toronto, Ontario, Canada. It is centred at the intersection of Spadina Avenue and Dundas Street West.

The present neighbourhood was the result of the government expropriating Toronto's first Chinatown in the late 1950s to make way for a new city hall and public square. As a result of the expropriations, a number of businesses and residents based in the city's first Chinatown moved west towards Spadina Avenue during the 1950s and 1960s, later joined by other Chinese immigrants during the 1960s. The neighbourhood is one of several Chinatowns in Toronto that developed during the latter half of the 20th century. This Chinatown is sometimes referred to as West Chinatown to differentiate from both the first Chinatown located more centrally and East Chinatown developed at the intersection of Broadview Avenue and Gerrard Street East.

== History ==
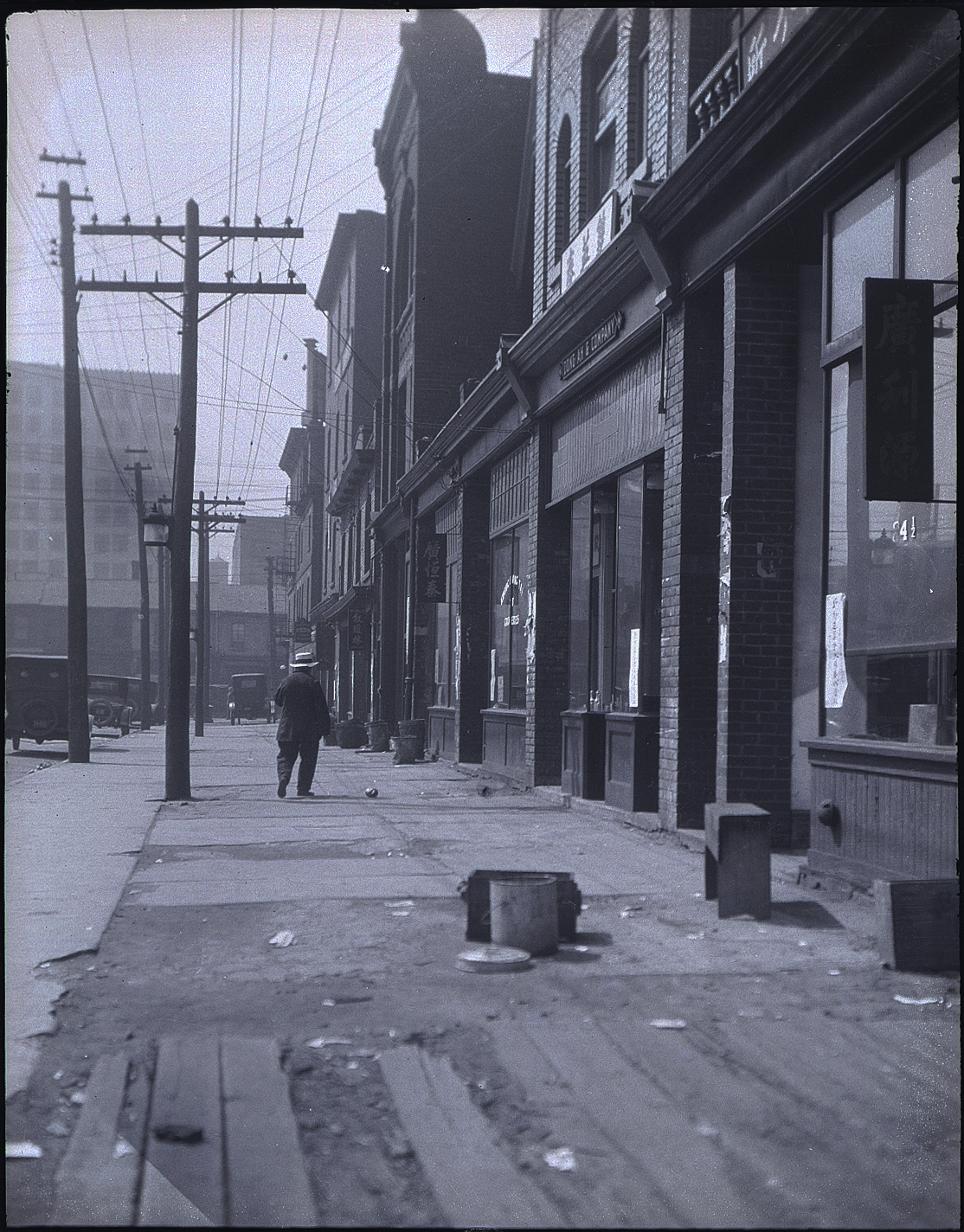
Empty street scene, First Chinatown, 1923

Toronto's present-day downtown Chinatown was formerly a Jewish district, although a small Chinese community was already present in this location prior to the 1950s.

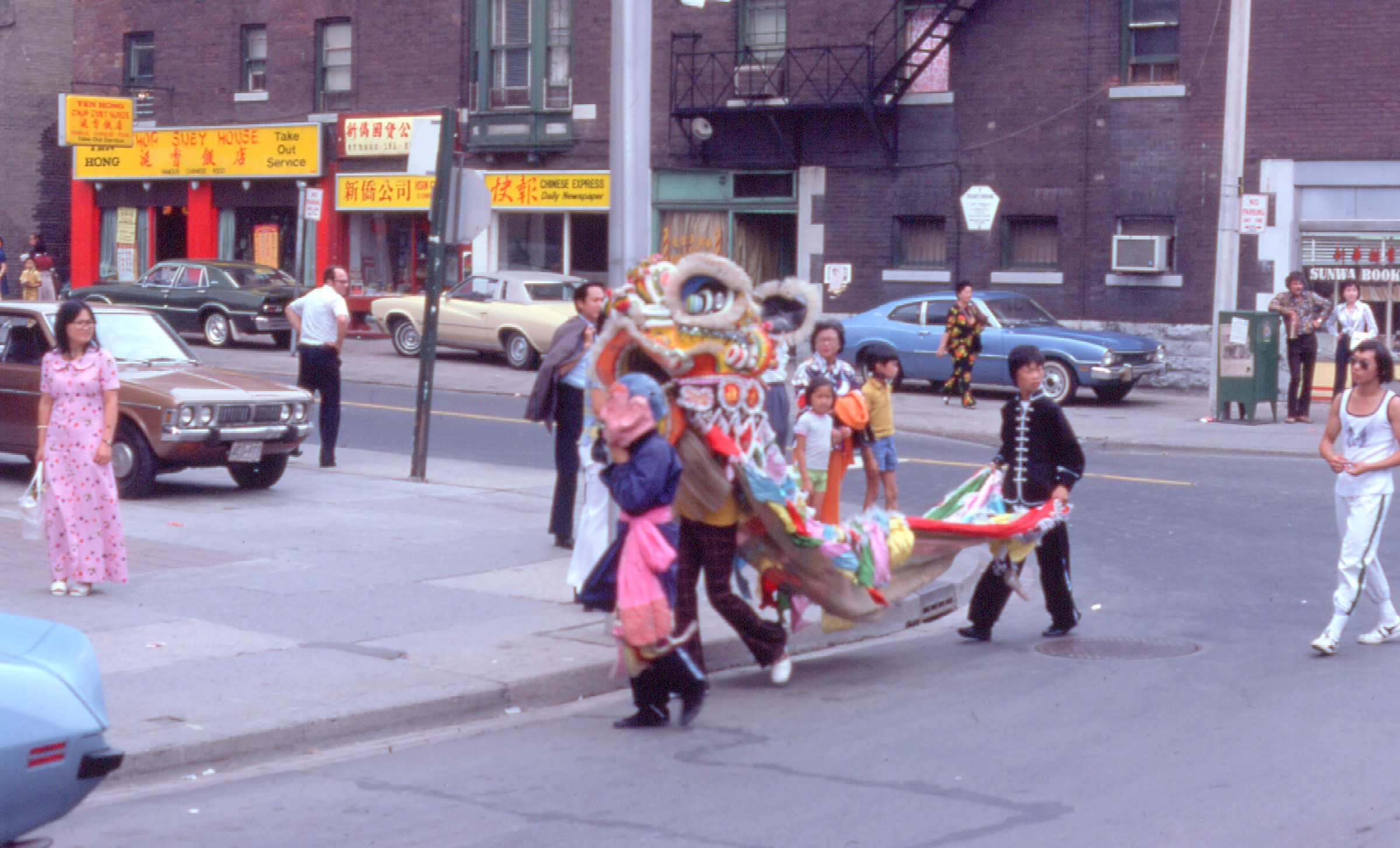
A lion dance in First Chinatown, 1975

The creation of this Chinatown was driven by the demolition of First Chinatown at Bay Street and Dundas Street West, from the 1950s to 1960s to make way for Toronto City Hall. While a handful of Chinese businesses still thrive there, much of the Chinese community have largely migrated west from there to the present Chinatown neighbourhood, thus its name, "West Chinatown". Chinatown continued to expand with the influx of Chinese immigrants during the 1960s, many of the wives and descendants of the Chinese men already in Canada due to the lifting of Canada's racial exclusion act. With much of Toronto's downtown Jewish population moving north along Bathurst Street, the businesses in this area became largely Chinese.

In the following decades, students and skilled workers arrived from Hong Kong, Guangdong province and Chinese communities in Southeast Asia and the Caribbean further increased the Chinese population, which led to the creation of additional Chinese communities east of Toronto. The neighbourhood has been noted as being a "near complete community" with housing, employment, and commerce, along with schools and social services all located within walking distance in the neighbourhood.

Today, the economic and social centre of Toronto's downtown Chinatown primarily runs north–south along Spadina Avenue from College Street to Sullivan Street and east–west along Dundas Street West from Augusta Avenue to Beverley Street. A mansion that is converted to the Italian Consulate is at the northwest corner of Dundas and Beverley.

Since the 2000s, the West Chinatown has been changing from the influx of new residents, businesses from immigrants and second generation Canadians. The neighbourhood has continued to serve as a vital market hub and services, to people from inside the neighbourhood and outside. The central location of the neighbourhood has also been a draw for property developers, changing the face of the neighbourhood.

Meanwhile, since the 2010s, the neighbourhood of the first Chinatown is sometimes referred to as Little Tokyo, due to the number of Japanese businesses that have popped up in the area.

== Economy ==
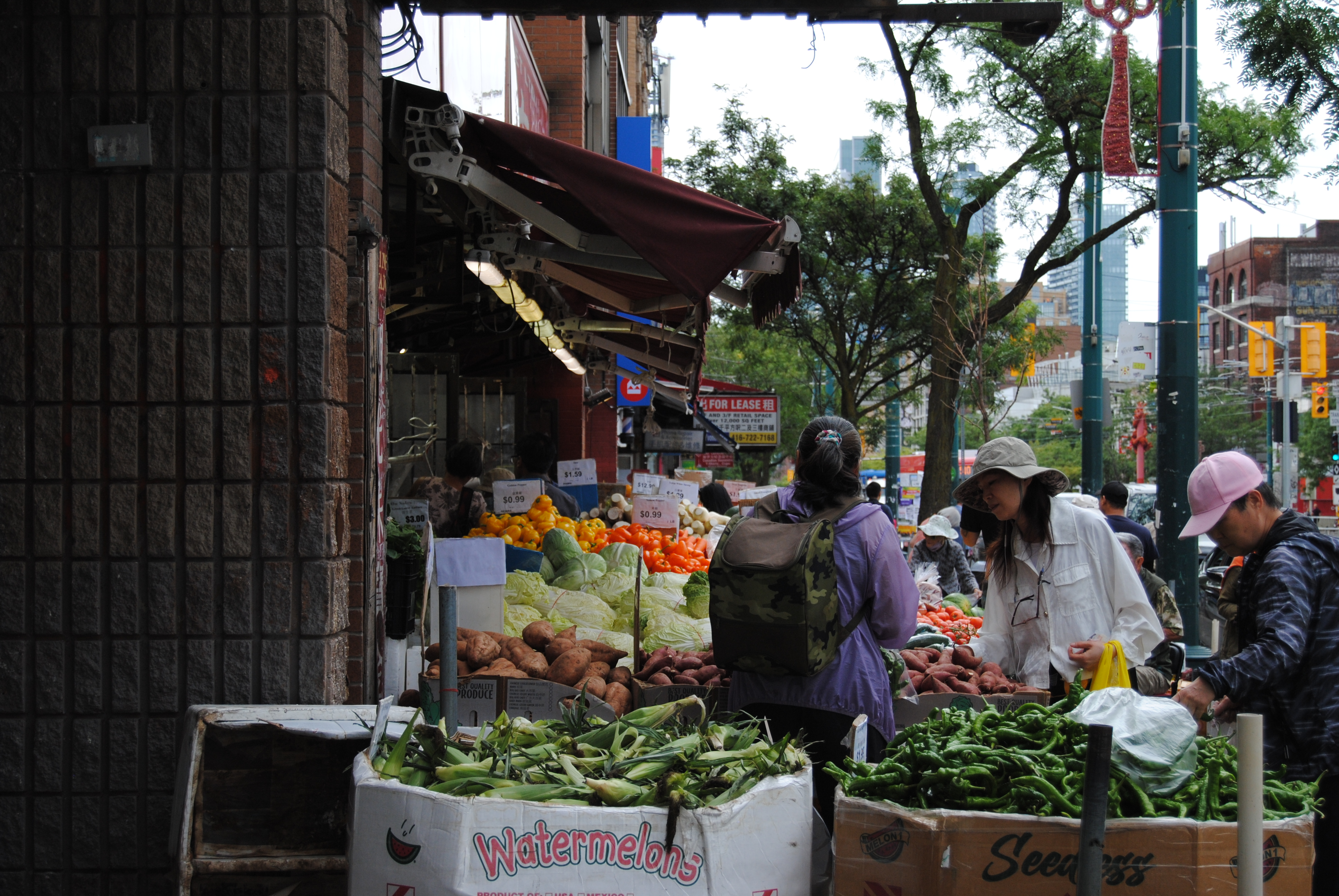
The area hosts a diverse set of East Asian cuisines, groceries, and shops.

Toronto's downtown Chinatown is one of the largest in North America. It is centred on the intersection of Dundas Street West and Spadina Avenue and extends outward from this point along both streets. With the population changes of recent decades, it has come to reflect a diverse set of East Asian cultures through its shops and restaurants, including Chinese and Vietnamese. The major Chinese malls in the area are Dragon City and Chinatown Centre.

Since the 1990s, downtown Chinatown has been redefining itself in the face of changing demographics and gentrification of the neighbourhood. As the aging population shrank, revenues of businesses in the neighbourhood also decreased. While the majority of the grocery stores and shops remain, most of the once-famed restaurants on Dundas Street West, especially the barbecue shops located below grade, have closed since 2000. Competition from commercial developments in suburban Chinese communities also drew wealth and professional immigrants away from downtown. Unlike those newer developments in the suburbs, Chinatown's economy relies heavily on tourism and Chinese seniors. As many younger, higher-income immigrants settled elsewhere in the city, those left in the district are typically from older generations who depend on downtown's dense concentration of services and accessibility to public transportation. With developers changing or resulting in the closure of well-regarded businesses, the Chinatown neighbourhood is facing the pressures of gentrification along with many other Toronto ethnic neighbourhoods and communities such as Greektown, Koreatown, Little Portugal, and Little Italy.

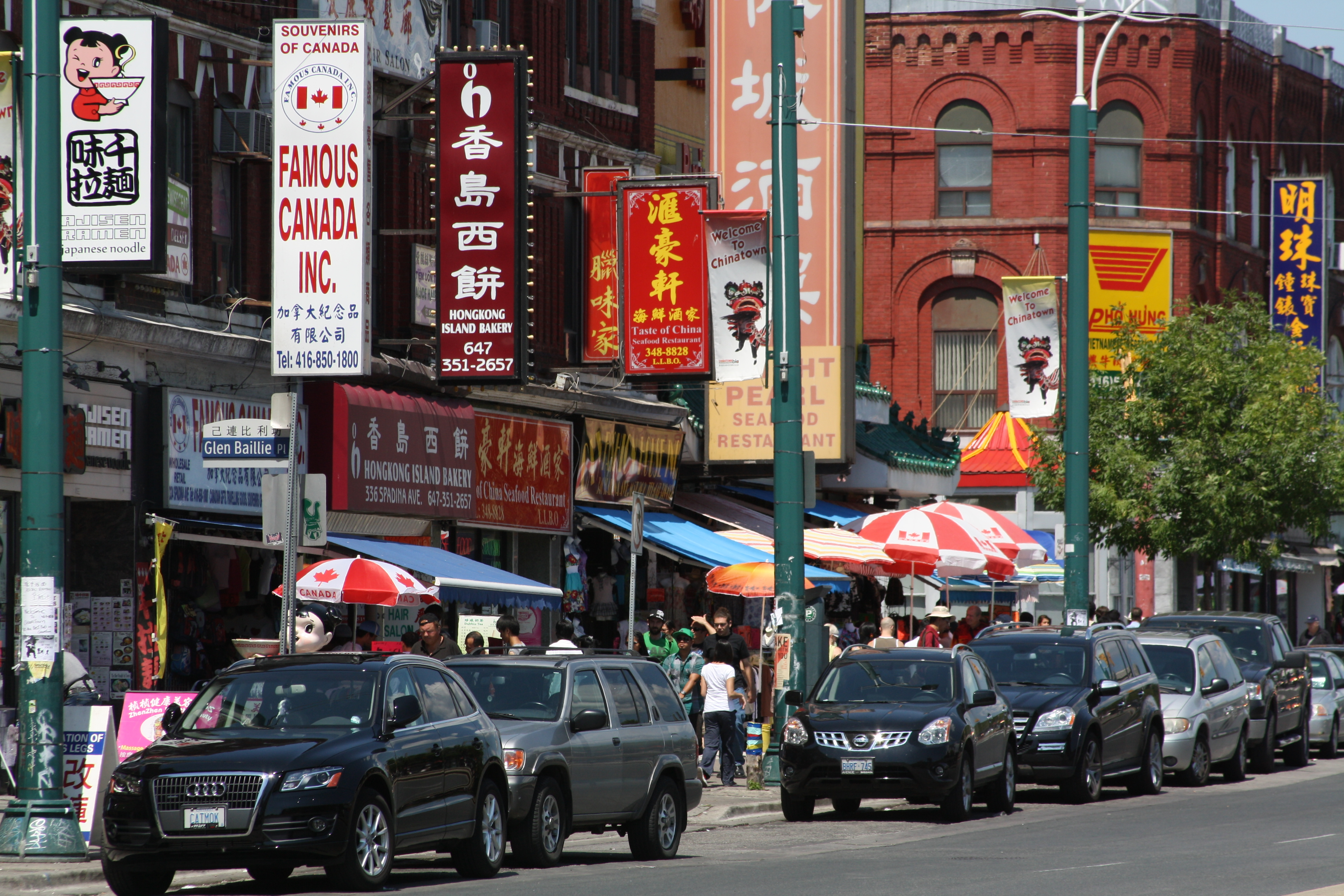
Spadina Avenue in 2011

In the early 21st century, downtown neighbourhoods became more attractive to urban professionals and young people who work in the Financial District, as well as its proximity to the University of Toronto and to OCAD University, leading to the gentrification of surrounding areas and potentially changing the face of West Chinatown.

A key representative of the neighbourhood and its interests is the Toronto Chinatown Business Improvement Area (多倫多華埠商業促進區), also known as the Chinatown BIA. A non-for-profit organization funded by the commercial property owners of the downtown Chinatown area, it was founded in 2007 and works closely with representatives of the federal, provincial, and city government, the police, as well as community stakeholders to promote and enhance the community as a commercial destination while maintaining its cultural character.

== Demographics ==
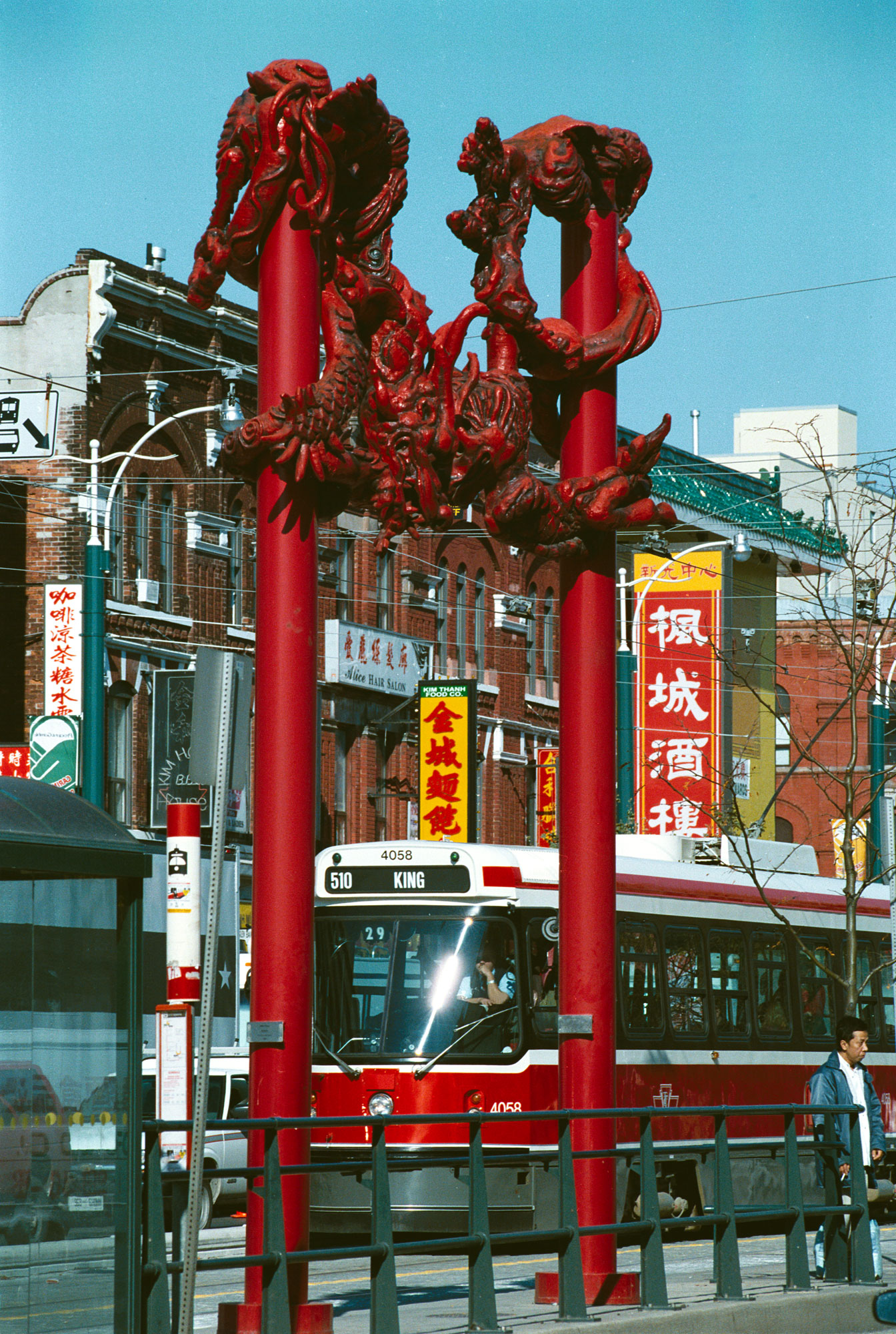
The present-day West Chinatown is located along Spadina Avenue, emerging with the influx of Chinese immigrants in the 1960s.

Historically, Toronto's Downtown Chinatown has been represented by immigrants and families from southern China and Hong Kong. Since the transfer of Hong Kong's sovereignty to the People's Republic of China in 1997, immigrants from mainland China have greatly exceeded those from Hong Kong. However, at present Cantonese remains the primary language used by businesses and restaurants in Chinatown.

To the east of Spadina Avenue, numerous university students attending the University of Toronto, OCAD University, and Toronto Metropolitan University live in many of the small houses built as workers' housing.

== Neighbourhood features ==
Both the 505 Dundas and 510 Spadina streetcar routes run through Chinatown, with the latter line being dedicated the right-of-way.

The El Mocambo live music venue is in the northern end of Chinatown, although this 1940s establishment was there before the neighbourhood became Chinatown.

=== Schools ===
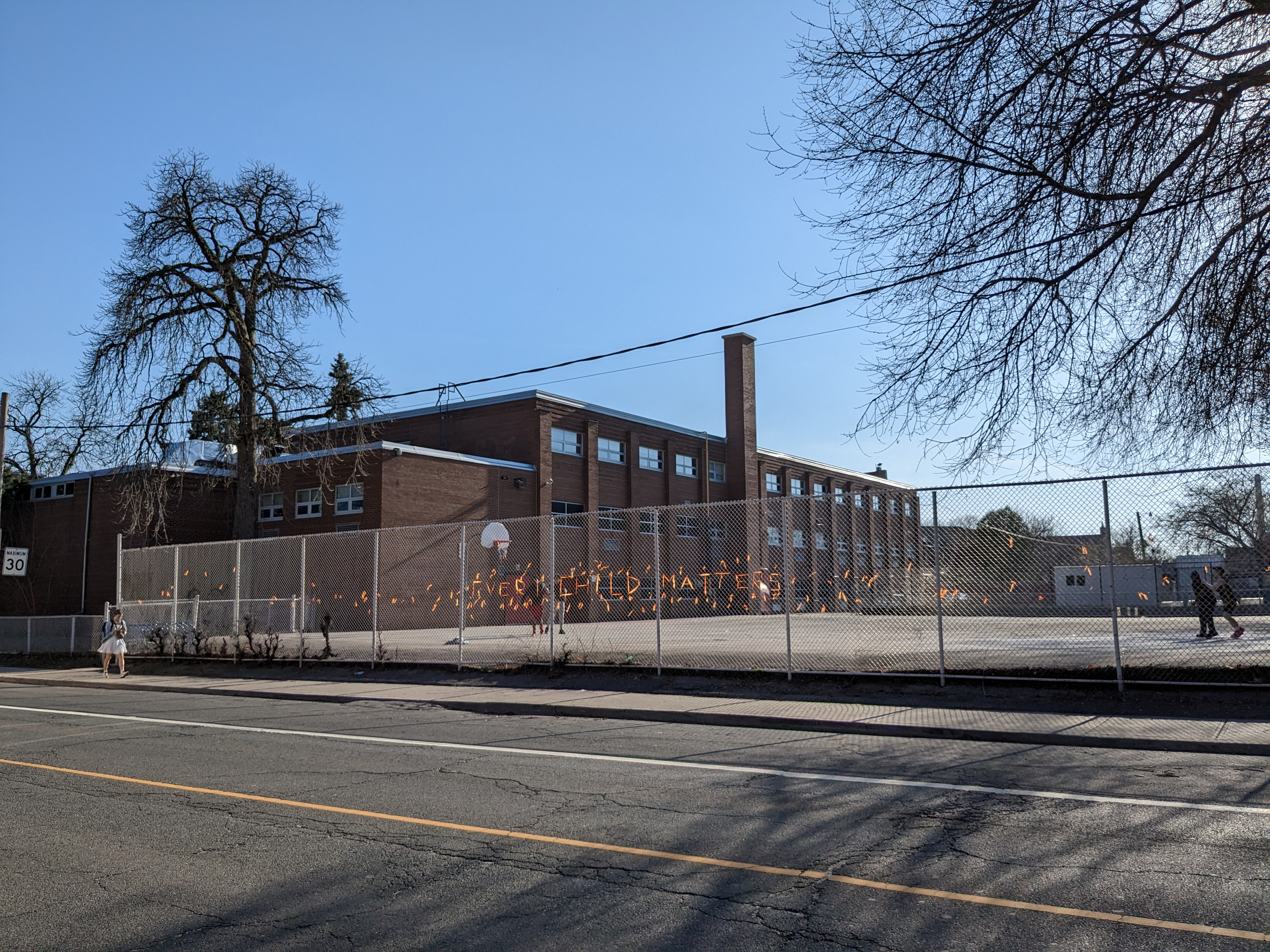
Heydon Park Secondary School is an all-girls high school in the Toronto District School Board located on D'Arcy Street since 2000. This building was originally built in 1967 as St. Patrick Catholic School as an elementary school which became a high school in 1986.

- Heydon Park Secondary School is located on 70 D'Arcy Street as the Toronto District School Board's only girls' high school in the city. This school was founded in 1923 as Edith L. Groves Vocational School for Girls when at Huron Street Public School. In 1926 the school moved to the Anglican Orphans Home on Dovercourt; It was named after a former school board trustee who had a passion for helping young females with exceptionalities. In 1962, the school was rebuilt and renamed Heydon Park Secondary School. It moved to its current D’Arcy St. location near the Art Gallery of Ontario in 2000 when the Dovercourt site closed. The current location was built in 1967 as St. Patrick Catholic School when the Metropolitan Separate School Board (now the Toronto Catholic District School Board) relocated this school to the former site of Eitz Chaim Schools which acquired the Italian Club in 1917, but the school was rebuilt in 1927 in the same site after the fire but remained there before relocating from that location in 1966. The campus opened in 1968 and was used as an elementary school until 1983. The school was reopened in 1986 as a high school; but the school was relocated to the former Lakeview Secondary School in 1989, while the Toronto Board of Education (later merged into the TDSB) used the building for administrative purposes prior to Heydon Park's arrival. Since then, Heydon Park has been a safe haven for young female pupils who needed an alternative to the regular school setting with a future that envisions a more inclusive education system for female, transgender and gender non-binary students from all backgrounds and cultures, and with diverse strengths and interests.

=== Bilingual street names ===
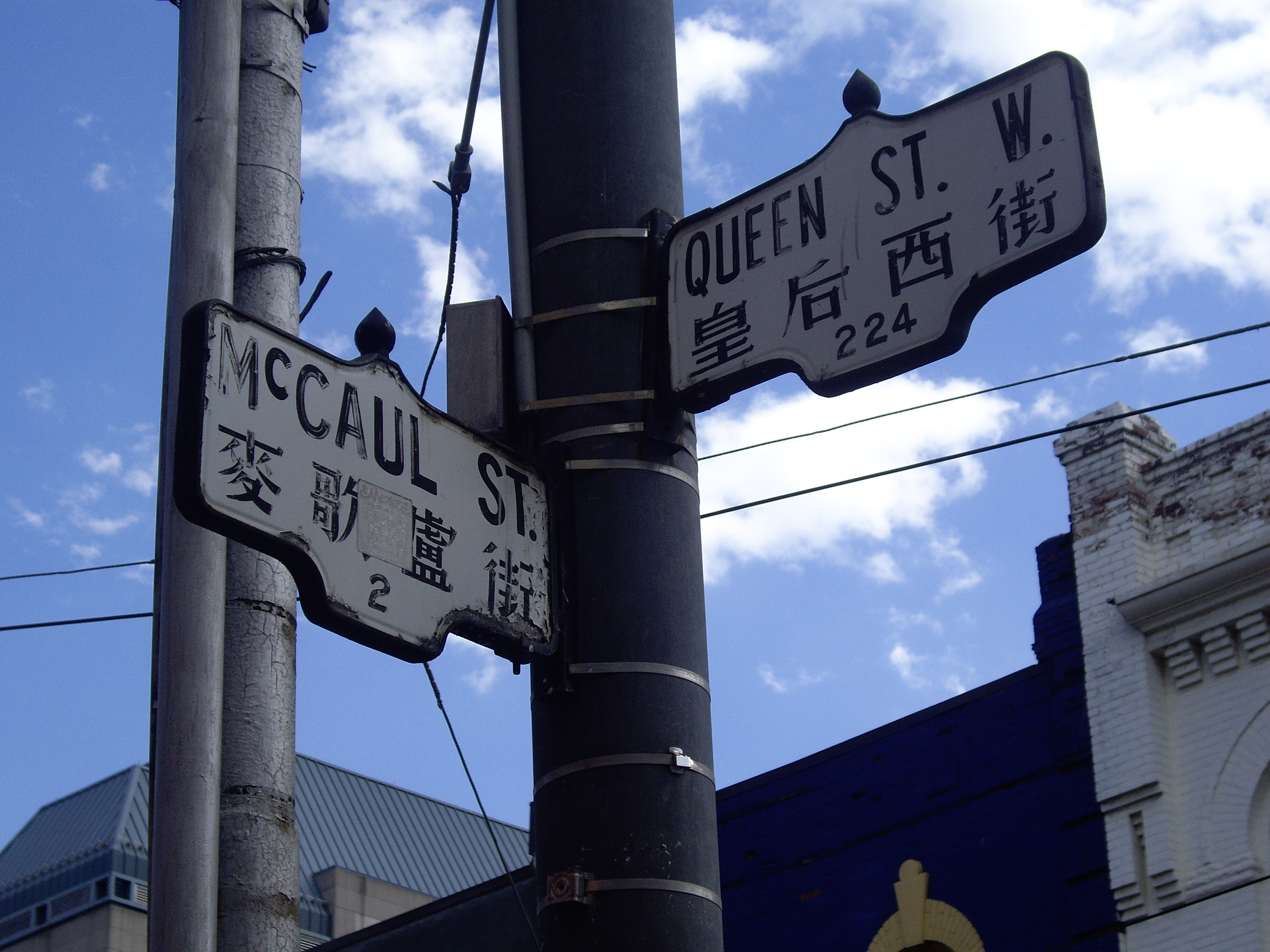
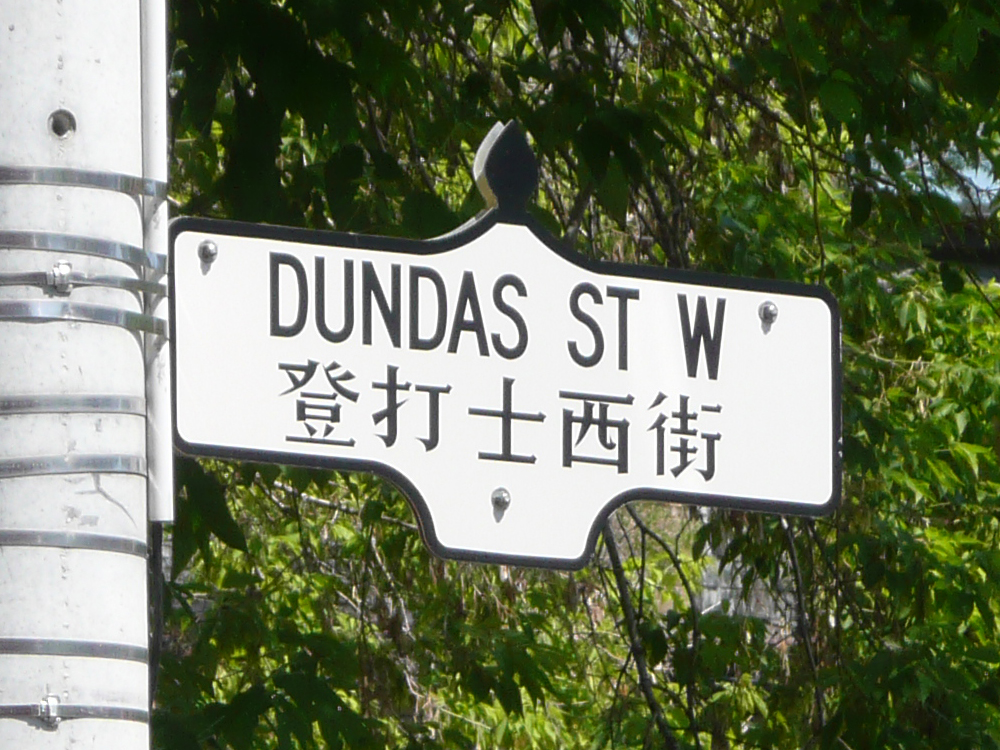
Examples of street name signs in Chinatown. The bilingual signs (in Chinese and English) were first introduced in the 1970s.

A number of streets in Downtown Chinatown are bilingual, a feature first introduced in the 1970s. The majority of these name are phonetic transliterations through Cantonese or Taishanese pronunciations into Chinese characters, while streets such as College and Queen streets are literally translated:

- Augusta Avenue - 澳吉士打道 (Jyutping: ou3 gat1 si6 daa2 dou6)
- Baldwin Street - 寶雲街 (Jyutping: bou2 wan4 gaai1)
- Beverley Street - 比華利街 (Jyutping: bei2 waa4 lei6 gaai1)
- Bulwer Street - 寶華街 (Jyutping: bou2 waa4 gaai1)
- Cameron Street - 卡梅隆街 (Jyutping: kaa1 mui4 lung4 gaai1)
- Cecil Street - 施素街 (Jyutping: si1 sou3 gaai1)
- College Street - 書院街 (Jyutping: syu1 jyun2 gaai1)
- D'Arcy Street - 達士街 (Jyutping: daat6 si6 gaai1)
- Dundas Street West - 登打士西街 (Jyutping: dang1 daa2 si6 sai1 gaai1)
- Glasgow Street - 嘉士高街 (Jyutping: gaa1 si1 gou1 gaai1)
- Grange Avenue - 固連治道 (Jyutping gu3 lin4 zi6 dou6)
- Grange Place - 固連治坊 (Jyutping: gu3 lin4 zi6 fong1)
- Grange Road - 固連治路 (Jyutping: gu3 lin4 zi6 lou6)
- Henry Street - 亨利街 (Jyutping hang1 lei6 gaai1)
- Huron Street - 曉倫街 (Jyutping: hiu2 leon4 gaai1)
- John Street - 約翰街 (Jyutping: joek3 hon6 gaai1)
- Kensington Avenue - 京士頓道 (Jyutping: ging1 si6 deon6 dou6)
- McCaul Street - 麥歌盧街 (Jyutping: mak6 go1 lou4 gaai1)
- Nassau Street - 拿素街 (Jyutping: naa1 sou3 gaai1)
- Oxford Street - 牛津街 (Jyutping: ngau4 zeon1 gaai1)
- Phoebe Street - 菲比街 (Jyutping: fei1 bei2 gaai1)
- Queen Street West - 皇后西街 (Jyutping: wong4 hau6 sai1 gaai1)
- Renfrew Place - 温富坊 (Jyutping: wan1 fu3 fong1)
- Ross Street - 羅士街 (Jyutping: lo4 si6 gaai1)
- Saint Andrew Street - 聖安德魯街 (Jyutping: sing3 on1 dak1 lou5 gaai1)
- Soho Street - 蘇豪街 (Jyutping; sou1 hou4 gaai1)
- Spadina Avenue - 士巴丹拿道 (Jyutping: si6 baa1 daan1 naa4 dou6)
- Stephanie Street - 史蒂芬尼街 (Jyutping: si2 dai3 fan1 nei4 gaai1)
- Sullivan Street - 蘇利雲街 (Jyutping: sou1 lei6 wan4 gaai1)

== Other Chinatowns in Greater Toronto ==
Although the present downtown Chinatown is one of the more well known Chinese ethnic enclaves in Toronto, the city has a number of other neighbourhoods that have a high concentration of Chinese businesses, and people. Other Chinese ethnic enclaves in Toronto, and the Greater Toronto Area include:

- East Chinatown, Toronto (1970s–present): Centred at Broadview Avenue and Gerrard Street East (43.666614°N 79.347295°W). Formed during the expropriation of First Chinatown and the increase of property prices in downtown/west Chinatown. The Chinese community from this neighbourhood originates from overseas communities from the Caribbean, and Southeast Asia, with some of Toisanese Chinese.
- Agincourt, Toronto, in (1980s–present): Centred on Sheppard Avenue between Midland Avenue and Brimley Road (43.7870089°N 79.2761871°W). The first suburban Chinatown in Toronto with its Chinese residents originating from Hong Kong and Taiwan.
- Milliken, Markham, and Toronto (1990s–present): Centred near Steeles Avenue and Kennedy Road (43.8236427°N 79.3113689°W). One of the first Chinese ethnic enclaves to extend into Greater Toronto, largely developed during the 1990s. The Chinese residents of the city originating from China, Hong Kong, and Taiwan.
- Thornhill, Markham, and Richmond Hill (1990s–present): Straddling the municipal boundary near Leslie Street and Highway 7 (43.8445585°N 79.3823033°W). One of the first Chinese ethnic enclaves to develop in Greater Toronto, largely developed during the 1990s. The Chinese residents of the Richmond Hill originating from China, Hong Kong, and Taiwan.

== In popular culture ==
The 1999 Chow Yun-fat film The Corruptor was set in the New York City Chinatown, with scenes filmed in the Chinatowns of New York and Toronto.

The television series Kung Fu: The Legend Continues was filmed in Chinatown at Spadina Avenue and Dundas Street West for many episodes of its 1993–97 run. Filmed in Toronto, it portrays the Chinatown of an unidentified major U.S. city.

On an episode of the 1990s series Due South entitled "Chinatown" (Season 1, episode 6), Toronto's Dundas and Spadina Chinatown stood in for Chicago's Chinatown.

Toronto's Chinatown is featured prominently in the 2008 collection of short stories The Chinese Knot and Other Stories by Lien Chao.

Toronto band Do Make Say Think have a song titled "Chinatown" on their 2002 album & Yet & Yet.

The film Suite Suite Chinatown, directed by Aram Siu Wai Collier, was screened at the 14th Toronto Reel Asian International Film Festival.

The Pixar animated short Bao was set in Toronto and included scenes from Toronto's Chinatown, as was the Pixar animated film Turning Red, which also included scenes from Toronto's Chinatown.

== See also ==
- Chinatowns in Toronto
- Chinese Canadians
- List of Chinatowns
- Chinese Canadians in the Greater Toronto Area
- Standard Theatre
