= Goodbye Enemy Airship the Landlord Is Dead =

Goodbye Enemy Airship, the Landlord Is Dead

Studio album by Do Make Say Think
- Released: March 13, 2000 (Europe); March 27, 2000 (World)
- Recorded: December 1998; August 1999
- Studio: Rural barn (Port Hope); CIUT Radio (Toronto)
- Genre: Post-rock
- Length: 48:34
- Label: Constellation CST010
- Producer: Do Make Say Think

Do Make Say Think chronology
Do Make Say Think (1999)	Goodbye Enemy Airship, the Landlord Is Dead (2000)	& Yet & Yet (2002)

Professional ratings
Review scores
Source	Rating
Allmusic	4/5 stars
Pitchfork	7.9/10

Goodbye Enemy Airship the Landlord Is Dead is the second studio album by the Canadian post-rock band Do Make Say Think. It was released on March 13, 2000 in Europe and March 23, 2000 worldwide. The record was published through the influential Montreal-based record label, Constellation Records.

"The Apartment Song" and "Goodbye Enemy Airship", were recorded in 1998 at CIUT-FM studios at the University of Toronto, the same place where the group's eponymous debut album was recorded. The remaining songs were recorded in 1999 at a barn near Port Hope, Ontario owned by keyboardist Jason McKenzie's grandparents. The venue imbued the record with a lofty, nighttime ambiance complete with crickets chirping.

The album was shortlisted for the Polaris Heritage Prize at the 2025 Polaris Music Prize.

== Track listing ==
No.	Title	Length
1.	"When Day Chokes the Night"	6:38
2.	"Minmin"	8:23
3.	"The Landlord Is Dead"	5:39
4.	"The Apartment Song"	3:52
5.	"All of This Is True"	7:46
6.	"Bruce E Kinesis"	3:39
7.	"Goodbye Enemy Airship"	12:37

== Personnel ==
=== Do Make Say Think ===
- Ohad Benchetrit – guitar, bass, saxophone, flute
- Jason McKenzie – keyboards, effects
- Dave Mitchel – drums
- James Payment – drums
- Justin Small – guitar
- Charles Spearin – guitar, bass, trumpet

=== Production ===
- Do Make Say Think – producer
- Ohad Benchetrit – mixing, mastering
- Charles Spearin – mixing, mastering
- Stephanie Small – cover photograph
- Aaron Pocock – insert and sleeve photography
