= Do Make Say Think (album) =

Studio album by Do Make Say Think
- Released: November 3, 1998 March 8, 1999 (Re-release)
- Recorded: September 1996; July 1997
- Studios: CIUT Radio (Toronto); Harris Institute for the Arts (Toronto)
- Genres: Post-rock; space rock; dub; electronic; experimental
- Length: 72:44
- Label: Constellation CST005
- Producer: Do Make Say Think

Do Make Say Think chronology
Do Make Say Think (1998)	Goodbye Enemy Airship the Landlord Is Dead (2000)

Professional ratings
Review scores
Source	Rating
Almost Cool	(7.2/10)
Allmusic	4/5 stars

Do Make Say Think is the self-titled debut album of Do Make Say Think. It was released in March 1999 by Constellation Records.

The album was originally self-released and distributed on November 3, 1998 by the band members. However, it was later delivered to Constellation Records, where it was formally released by the record label. This marked the first time that Constellation had released material by a band outside of Quebec.

The recording took place in the CIUT-FM radio studios of the University of Toronto and at the Harris Institute for the Arts.

The packaging includes a window in the front through which one of three provided pieces of card can be displayed, each bearing a design on both sides.

== Track listing ==
No.	Title	Length
1.	"1978"	10:29
2.	"Le'espalace"	7:53
3.	"If I Only…"	7:23
4.	"Highway 420"	8:55
5.	"Dr. Hooch"	7:48
6.	"Disco & Haze"	9:08
7.	"Onions"	1:31
8.	"The Fare to Get There"	19:32

== Personnel ==
=== Do Make Say Think ===
- Ohad Benchetrit – guitar, bass, saxophone, flute
- Jason McKenzie – keyboards, effects
- Dave Mitchell – drums
- James Payment – drums
- Justin Small – guitar
- Charles Spearin – guitar, bass, trumpet

=== Technical ===
- Do Make Say Think – producer
