= Valley of the Giants =

Valley of the Giants may refer to:

== Places ==
- Valley of the Giants (Oregon), a forest preserve
- Valley of the Giants (Michigan), a stand of virgin Old Growth cedar on South Manitou Island
- Valley of the Giants, Western Australia, Denmark, Western Australia

== Music ==
- Valley of the Giants (band)
- Valley of the Giants (album), self-titled debut album

== Films ==
- The Valley of the Giants (1919 film), a silent drama directed by James Cruze
- The Valley of the Giants (1927 film), directed by Charles Brabin
- Valley of the Giants (film), a 1938 film directed by William Keighley

== Other ==
- Valley of the Giants, a 2004 book by Bob Brown.
