= Years (disambiguation) =

Years is the plural of year, a unit of time based on how long it takes the Earth to orbit the Sun.

Years may also refer to:

- Ohad Benchetrit or Years, Canadian musician
- Years (Years album), 2009
- Years (John Anderson album), 2020
- "Years" (song), a 1979 song by Barbara Mandrell

== See also ==
- Years (by One Thousand Fingertips), a 2009 album by Attack in Black
