= Other Truths =

2009 studio album by Do Make Say Think

Studio album by Do Make Say Think
- Released: 19 October 2009 (Europe); 20 October 2009 (World)
- Recorded: 2009
- Studios: Giant Studios (Toronto); Th'Schvitz (Toronto)
- Genre: Post-rock
- Length: 43:44
- Label: Constellation CST062
- Producer: Do Make Say Think

Do Make Say Think chronology
You, You're a History in Rust (2007)	Other Truths (2009)	Stubborn Persistent Illusions (2017)

Professional ratings
Aggregate scores
Source	Rating
Metacritic	71/100
Review scores
Source	Rating
AllMusic	3.5/5 stars
BBC	(favourable)
Drowned In Sound	(9/10)
Sputnikmusic	4/5 stars
Pitchfork Media	7.2/10

Other Truths is the sixth album from Do Make Say Think. It was released on 19 October 2009, in Europe and 20 October 2009, in the rest of the world.

== Track listing ==
No.	Title	Length
1.	"Do"	10:40
2.	"Make"	12:10
3.	"Say"	12:44
4.	"Think"	8:09

== Personnel ==
=== Do Make Say Think ===
- Ohad Benchetrit – guitar, keyboard, horns
- Dave Mitchell – drums
- James Payment – drums
- Justin Small – guitar, keyboard
- Charles Spearin – guitar, bass, keyboard, horns

=== Other musicians ===
- Julie Penner – violin
- Michael Barth – trumpet
- Akron/Family & Lullabye Arkestra – vocals

=== Technical ===
- Do Make Say Think – producer
- Phil Demetro – mastering
