= Years (Years album) =

Studio album by Years
- Released: May 5, 2009
- Recorded: 2008
- Genres: Instrumental, post-rock
- Label: Arts & Crafts
- Producer: Ohad Benchetrit

Professional ratings
Review scores
Source	Rating
Chart	4/5 stars
Drowned in Sound	(9/10)
NME	(8/10)

Years is the debut solo album by Years, a solo project by Ohad Benchetrit of Do Make Say Think and Broken Social Scene.

Years was born from the wealth of music that Benchetrit had been gathering, but did not belong with his other projects. "I basically just wanted to use all of this material that I'd compiled on my hard drive," he says, "songs that got started and never finished, or that were parts of other projects and never really got off the ground. So I started trying to finish that [unfinished] record. But in the process, I kept replacing the older songs, one song at a time. About a year later, I'd replaced them all. Years was the album I was left with."

Years has been described as "the best parts of Bell Orchestre, I Am Robot And Proud and The Hylozoists, and combines them into a sweeping flurry of instruments" Years was recently named "record of the year" by Jude Rogers of The Guardian, and was described as "quite simply a triumph" by Paul Brown of Drowned in Sound.

== Guest appearances ==
Performers on the album include fellow Do Make Say Think members Justin Small, and Dave Mitchell, as well as frequent Broken Social Scene contributors Evan Cranley and Julie Penner.

== Track listing ==
1. "Kids Toy Love Affair"
2. "Don't Let the Blind Go Deaf"
3. "Are You Unloved?"
4. "Hey Cancer... Fuck You!"
5. "Binary Blues"
6. "A Thousand Times a Day (Someone Is Flying)"
7. "The Assassination of Dow Jones"
8. "Lasantha Wickrematunge"
9. "September 5. October 21. 2007."
10. "The Fall of Winter"
11. "The Major Lift"
12. "44"
