= Stubborn Persistent Illusions =

Studio album by Do Make Say Think
- Released: 19 May 2017
- Recorded: 2014–2016
- Studio: Th'Schvitz (Toronto); Bathouse Recording Studio (Bath)
- Genre: Post-rock
- Length: 60:50
- Label: Constellation CST120
- Producer: Do Make Say Think

Do Make Say Think chronology
Other Truths (2009)	Stubborn Persistent Illusions (2017)

Professional ratings
Aggregate scores
Source	Rating
Metacritic	82/100
Review scores
Source	Rating
Pitchfork Media	7.8/10
Exclaim!	9/10

Stubborn Persistent Illusions is the seventh album from Canadian band Do Make Say Think. It was released on 19 May 2017. The album was in part inspired by Modest Mussorgsky's Pictures at an Exhibition suite.

== Track listing ==
No.	Title	Length
1.	"War on Torpor"	5:24
2.	"Horripilation"	10:27
3.	"A Murder of Thoughts"	5:52
4.	"Bound"	4:49
5.	"And Boundless"	7:13
6.	"Her Eyes on the Horizon"	8:20
7.	"d=3.57√h (As Far as the Eye Can See)"	7:52
8.	"Shlomo's Son"	3:45
9.	"Return, Return Again"	7:08

== Personnel ==
=== Do Make Say Think ===
- Ohad Benchetrit – guitar, keyboard, horns
- David Mitchell – drums
- James Payment – drums
- Justin Small – guitar, keyboard
- Charles Spearin – guitar, bass, keyboard, horns

=== Other musicians ===
- Julie Penner – violin
- Michael Barth – trumpet
- Leon Kingstone – baritone saxophone
- Adam Marvy – trumpet

=== Technical ===
- Myles Spencer — engineer on “War On Torpor”, “Bound", "And Boundless”, and “Her Eyes On The Horizon”
- Marianne Collins — artwork
