= Besides (EP) =

EP by Do Make Say Think
- Released: December 8, 1999
- Recorded: Self-recorded
- Genre: Post-rock
- Length: 29:38
- Label: Resonant resonant 001

Besides is an EP by Do Make Say Think. It was released in December 1999 by Resonant Records in a vinyl-only format.

The songs on this EP were recorded by the band on an 8 track and mixed at Dave Audio in Toronto. They were selected from over 20 hours of music that the band both collectively and individually recorded over the first three years of their career. The only exception to this is the song "Bobby Zincone", which was recorded live at the Mockingbird Toronto.

== Track listing ==
1. "I Love You (La La La)" – 8:01
2. "Bobby Zincone" – 5:45
3. "Our Man in Havana" – 5:31
4. "A Week in the Dark" – 10:11

== Personnel ==
=== Do Make Say Think ===
- Ohad Benchetrit
- Jason McKenzie
- Dave Mitchell
- James Payment
- Justin Small
- Charles Spearin

== Album notes ==
Theres not much to do in Toronto on Tuesday night. Mabie yer friends and their problems have got the best of you and if its February on top of that, yer doomed. The highest of praise for the 8-track comes at these moments. The songs recorded are the purest of inspiration. Not intended for anyone elses ears but your own at the time. They are "the undeniable truths". Because after the stolen bikes, stoned Sunday afternoons, bounced rent cheques, awkward conversations with x-girlfriends, sunsets, pet deaths, first kisses and last goodbyes itsa good idea to hit play & record. Yes.
