= You, You're a History in Rust =

Studio album by Do Make Say Think
- Released: February 12, 2007
- Recorded: April and September 2005; March and May 2006
- Studios: Mitchell family cottage (Parry Sound); Howard family barn (Delta); Th' Schvitz (Toronto); Room 8 (Toronto)
- Genre: Post-rock
- Label: Constellation CST045
- Producer: Do Make Say Think

Do Make Say Think chronology
Winter Hymn Country Hymn Secret Hymn (2003)	You, You're a History in Rust (2007)	Other Truths (2009)

Professional ratings
Aggregate scores
Source	Rating
Metacritic	77/100
Review scores
Source	Rating
AllMusic	4.5/5 stars
No Ripcord	(8/10)
Sonic Frontiers	(8.7/10)

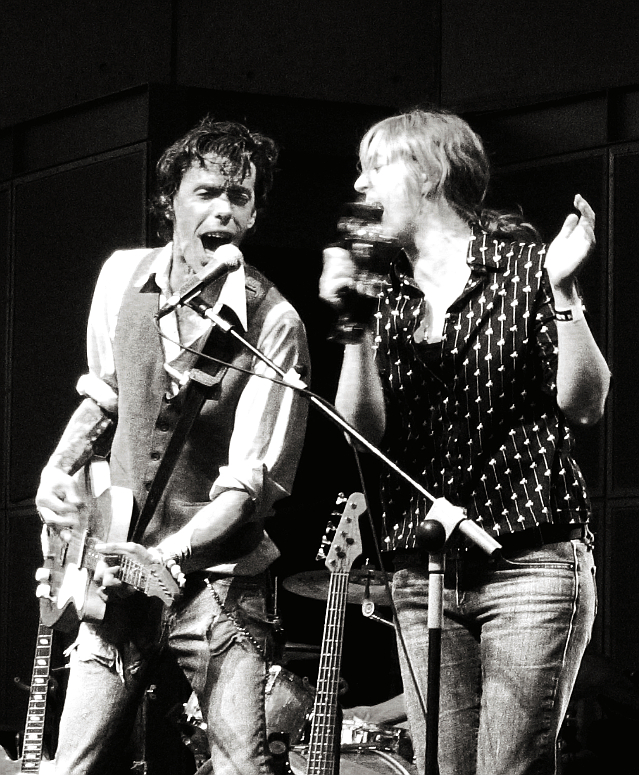
Justin Small and Julie Penner singing live during a live performance of Do Make Say Think at the Canada Day show in 2007.

You, You're a History in Rust is the fifth album from Do Make Say Think. It was released on February 12, 2007 in Europe and internationally on February 26, 2007. The album features vocals on two tracks, "A with Living" and "In Mind," a first for the band.

Kerrang! ranked it as one of the 16 greatest post-rock releases of all-time.

== Track listing ==
No.	Title	Length
1.	"Bound to Be That Way"	7:36
2.	"A with Living"	9:08
3.	"The Universe!"	5:03
4.	"A Tender History in Rust"	5:07
5.	"Herstory of Glory"	5:18
6.	"You, You're Awesome"	3:36
7.	"Executioner Blues"	8:38
8.	"In Mind"	4:00

== Personnel ==
=== Do Make Say Think ===
- Ohad Benchetrit – guitar, keyboard, horns
- Dave Mitchell – drums
- James Payment – drums
- Justin Small – guitar, keyboard
- Charles Spearin – guitar, bass, keyboard, horns

=== Other musicians ===
- Brian Cram – horns
- Mr. Jay Baird – horns
- Julie Penner – violin
- Jason Tait – vibraphone
- Deekus – marimba
- Alex Lukashevsky – vocals
- Tony Dekker – vocals
- Jimmy Anderson – musical saw
- Liyat Benchetrit – piano
- Akron/Family (Seth, Ryan, Dana, Miles) – vocals on track 2

=== Technical ===
- Do Make Say Think – producer
- Katia Taylor – front and back photographs
- James Payment – "Bike" photograph
- Eleanor Kure – "Buddy" (dog) photograph
- Yochana Benchetrit – painting
- Ananuku Kolar – artwork layout
