= The Happiness Project =

Studio album by Charles Spearin
- Released: February 10, 2009
- Recorded: 2007–2008
- Genres: Avant-garde, jazz fusion
- Length: 37:45
- Label: Arts & Crafts
- Producer: Charles Spearin

Professional ratings
Review scores
Source	Rating
Drowned in Sound	link
Pitchfork	6.8/10 link

The Happiness Project is the title of Charles Spearin's debut album. Best known for his work with Toronto-based bands Do Make Say Think and Broken Social Scene, Charles Spearin began performing samples of The Happiness Project live during Broken Social Scene concerts, offering insight into the inspiration and concept of the album, which was long-listed for the 2009 Polaris Music Prize. On April 17, 2010, Spearin won a Juno Award for the Best Contemporary Jazz Album for The Happiness Project.

== Concept ==
The project sprang from casual interviews with people in Spearin's neighbourhood on the subject of happiness.

After each interview I would listen back to the recording for moments that were interesting in both meaning and melody. By meaning I mean the thoughts expressed, by melody I mean the cadence and inflection that give the voice a sing-song quality. It has always been interesting to me how we use sounds to convey concepts. Normally, we don’t pay any attention to the movement of our lips and tongue, and the rising and falling of our voices as we toss our thoughts back and forth to each other. We just talk and listen. The only time we pay attention to these qualities is in song. (Just as when we read we don’t pay attention to the curl and swing of the letters as though they were little drawings.)

Meaning seems to be our hunger but we should still try to taste our food. I wanted to see if I could blur the line between speaking and singing - life and art? - and write music based on these accidental melodies. So I had some musician friends play, as close as they could, these neighbourhood melodies on different instruments (Mrs. Morris on the tenor saxophone, Marisa on the harp, my daughter Ondine on the violin, etc.) and then I arranged them as though they were songs.

–Charles Spearin, on The Happiness Project

== Guest appearances ==
Performers on the album include fellow Broken Social Scene members Kevin Drew and Evan Cranley as well as fellow Do Make Say Think member Justin Small.

== Track listing ==
1. "Mrs. Morris"
2. "Anna"
3. "Vittoria"
4. "Vanessa"
5. "Marisa"
6. "Ondine"
7. "Mr. Gowrie"
8. "Mrs. Morris (reprise)"
