= Makura-Nage =

Japanese children's game

A Makura-Nage (Japanese: 枕投げ, まくらなげ) is a game from Japan in which children throw pillows at each other. A typical occasion to play it is after the futon are prepared (especially after the official lights-off time) in summer camp.

While a pillow fight mainly takes the form of beating each other with pillows, Japanese Makura-Nage is a game in which players mainly throw pillows to each other. The word "makura" means "pillow", "nage" means "throwing".

There were no rules for Makura-Nage, but today some Japanese ryokan hold Makura-Nage Games (まくら投げ大会) for advertisement.

In many anime and manga, a Makura-Nage scene creates a nostalgic atmosphere when describing children.

== See also ==
- Pillow fight
