= Pillow Fight Championship =

Sports organization

Pillow Fight Championship (PFC)
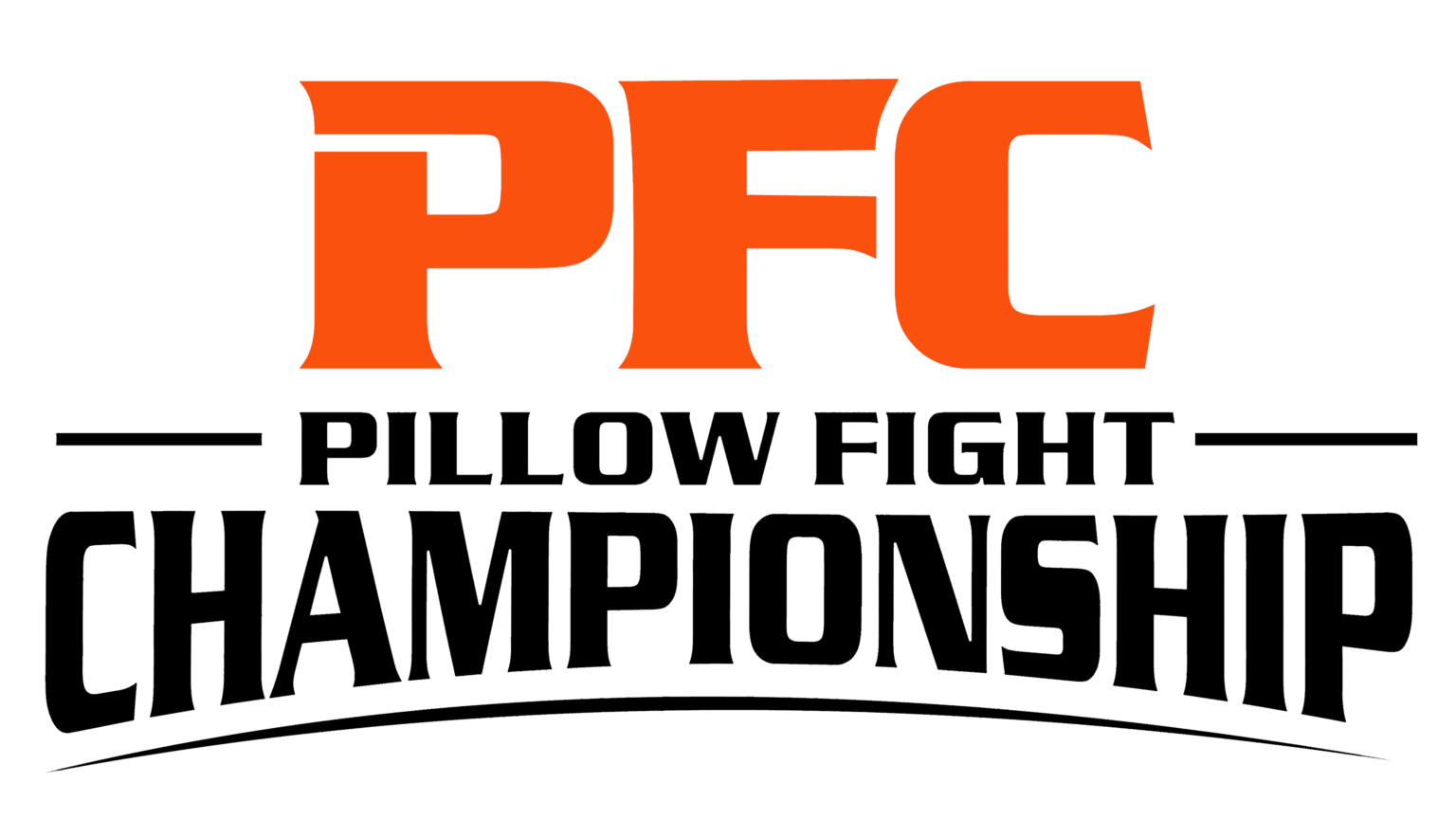
- Formation: 2021; 5 years ago
- Founder: Steve Williams (CEO); Paul Williams
- Website: fightpfc.com

The Pillow Fight Championship (PFC) is a professional sports organization that arranges competitive pillow fighting matches. It was founded by brothers Steve and Paul Williams in 2021.

The PFC is combat sport that combines elements of boxing and mixed martial arts (MMA) with competitors using specialized pillows.

== History ==
The concept for Pillow Fight Championship originated during the COVID-19 pandemic. Paul Williams initially created the concept and presented it to Steve Williams, who was hesitant about supporting the idea. Steve Williams was eventually convinced that pillow fighting would succeed over other, more traditional combat sports concepts due to factors including MMA market oversaturation and sponsorship issues. The intention was to create a combat sport that was more advertiser- and family-friendly. Steve Williams stated in 2022 that "the only difference between our fights and MMA fights is that nobody gets hurt," and that PFC was for "people who don't want to see the blood."

The first event staged by the PFC took place in August 2021.

On January 29, 2022, the inaugural Pillow Fight Championship took place in Florida. The event featured 16 men and 8 women for a total of 24 competitors. Participants engaged in strategic pillow fights using specialized pillows weighing 2 pounds (0.91 kg). The tournament followed a bracket-style format and was accessible to viewers as a pay-per-view event on FITE. Istela Nunes claimed the women's championship title by defeating Kendahl Voelker in the final match, while Hauley Tillman emerged as the men's division champion after prevailing over UFC fighter Marcus Brimage.

The 2023 Wogbejeke Pillow Fighting Championship took place on January 7, 2023 in Chorkor, Ghana. It was approved and sanctioned by Steve Williams.

In November 2024, Steve Williams stated that PFC had secured a deal for television broadcasting of pillow fights. Previously, PFC had aired or streamed on The Ocho, YouTube, SFT Combat, DAZN and Brazilian national television.

== Pillows ==
The pillows used for the championship are specially designed for combat; they feature unique handles and straps that can be used to maximize centrifugal force, shape-holding foam, and compression density. The pillowcase is made from sail cloth and features a waterproof and airproof polymer on one side.

Steve Williams began the championship with regular down feather pillows weighing 3.5 lb (1.6 kg), though found that fighters struggled to complete the initial 3 rounds of 2 minutes each due to their weight. Thus, he cut the 3 rounds to 90 seconds each and tried almost 100 different samples over the course of a year to find a suitable pillow for combat, settling on a 2 lb (0.91 kg) pillow.

Fans are given the pillows at the end of each event in an attempt to grow popularity for the sport.

== See also ==
- Pillow Fight League
