= Valley of the Giants (band) =

Canadian post-rock band

- Origin: Lanark Highlands, Ontario, Canada
- Genres: Post-rock; Dream pop
- Years active: 2002–2004
- Labels: Arts & Crafts
- Members: Brendan Canning; Charles Spearin; Deirdre Smith; Anthony Seck; Sophie Trudeau; Raoul Tangeuy
- Website: www.arts-crafts.ca/valleyofthegiants

Valley of the Giants is a Canadian post-rock supergroup composed of members from Broken Social Scene, Godspeed You! Black Emperor, Silver Mt. Zion, Do Make Say Think, Shalabi Effect, and Strawberry. Stylistically, Valley of the Giants blends rock with elements of folk and world music.

== History ==
Valley of the Giants formed in Lanark Highlands, Ontario, Canada, in early 2002, and included instrumentalists Brendan Canning, Charles Spearin and Anthony Seck, singer Deirdre Smith, violinist Sophie Trudeau and Raoul Tanguay. In 2004, the band released an album, Valley of the Giants: Westworld. which received relatively positive reviews. The album was produced by Seck and mixed by John Dooher.

== Members ==
- Brendan Canning (Broken Social Scene, hHead)
- Charles Spearin (Broken Social Scene, Do Make Say Think)
- Deirdre Smith (Strawberry)
- Anthony Seck (Shalabi Effect)
- Sophie Trudeau (Thee Silver Mt. Zion Memorial Orchestra & Tra-La-La Band, Godspeed You! Black Emperor)
- Raoul Tangeuy

== Discography ==
- Valley of the Giants (CD, 2004)
