= & Yet & Yet =

Studio album by Do Make Say Think
- Released: March 25, 2002
- Recorded: Home of bandmember Justin Small (Toronto); Manta DSP (Toronto)
- Genre: Post-rock
- Length: 48:44
- Label: Constellation CST020
- Producer: Do Make Say Think

Do Make Say Think chronology
Goodbye Enemy Airship the Landlord Is Dead (2000)	& Yet & Yet (2002)	Winter Hymn Country Hymn Secret Hymn (2003)

Professional ratings
Review scores
Source	Rating
Allmusic	2.5/5 stars
Pitchfork	8.1/10

& Yet & Yet is the third album by Canadian post-rock band Do Make Say Think. It was released on March 18, 2002 by Constellation Records.

"Chinatown" was featured on the soundtrack for Stephen Gaghan's Syriana.

== Track listing ==
All tracks written by Do Make Say Think

No.	Title	Length
1.	"Classic Noodlanding"	5:26
2.	"End of Music"	6:51
3.	"White Light Of"	6:56
4.	"Chinatown"	5:33
5.	"Reitschule"	9:15
6.	"Soul and Onward"	5:29
7.	"Anything for Now"	9:14

== Personnel ==
=== Do Make Say Think ===
- Ohad Benchetrit – writer, performer, producer, engineer, mixer
- Brian Cram – horns
- Dave Mitchell – writer, performer, producer
- James Payment – writer, performer, producer
- Justin Small – writer, performer, producer
- Charles Spearin – writer, performer, producer, engineer, mixer

=== Additional musicians ===
- Brian Cram – horns
- Tamara Williamson – vocals
