= Pillow fight flash mob =

Social phenomenon of pillow fighting

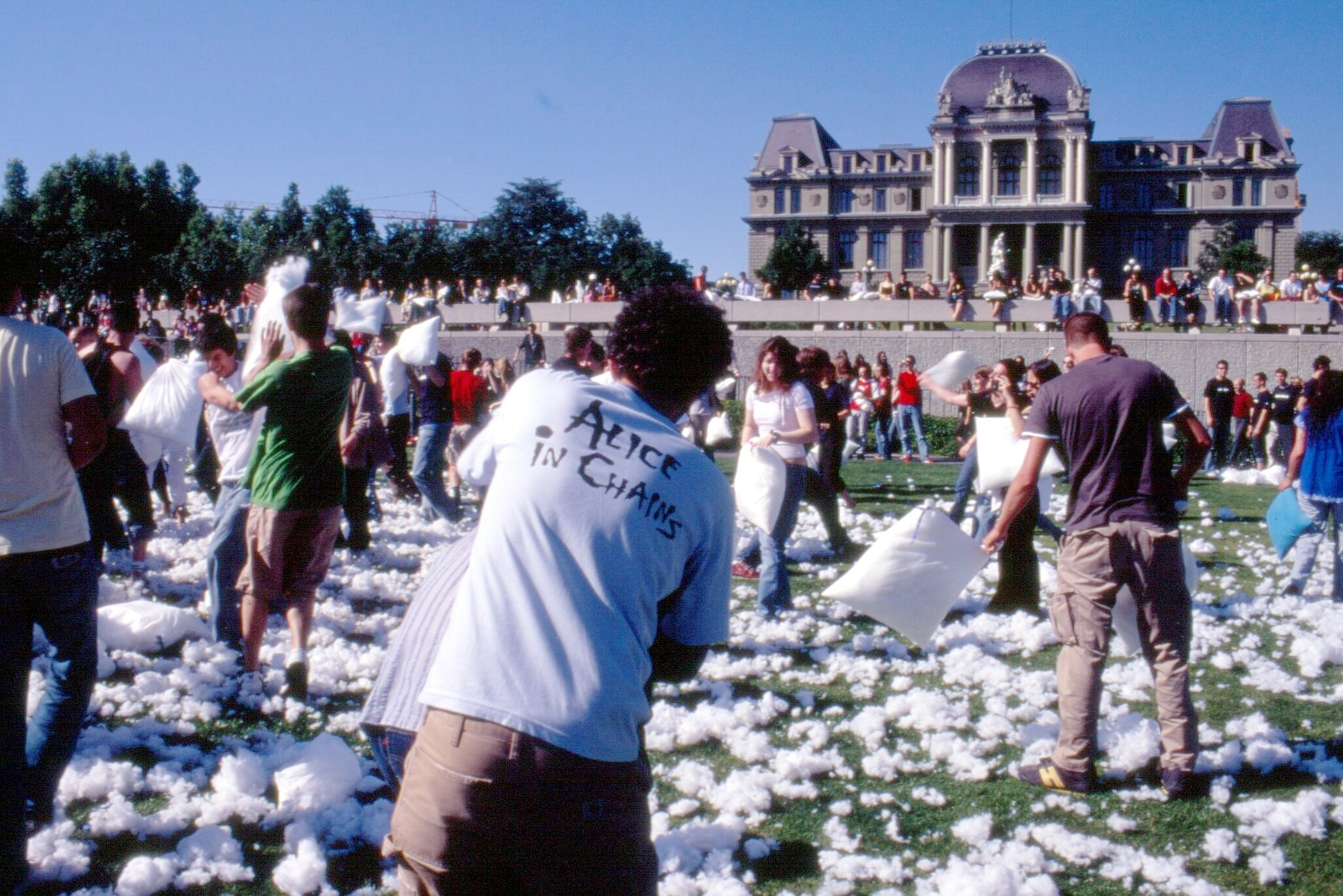
A pillow fight that took place in Lausanne, Switzerland, in front of the courthouse

A pillow fight flash mob is a social phenomenon of flash mobbing and shares many characteristics of a culture jam.

The flash mob version of massive pillow fights is distinguished by the fact that nearly all of the promotion is Internet-based. These events occur around the world, some taking the name Pillow Fight Club, a reference to Fight Club by Chuck Palahniuk in which anyone could join and fight as long as they fought by the rules. Both the London and Vancouver Pillow Fight Club's rules reflect that described in the book and feature film.

The trend owes much to uses of modern communications technologies, including decentralised personal networking, known as smartmobbing. Word of the events spreads primarily via digital means, usually on the internet via email, chat rooms and text messaging which result in seemingly spontaneous mass gatherings. Pillows are sometimes hidden and at the exact pre-arranged time or the sound of a whistle, the pillow fighters pull out their pillows and commence pillow fighting. The pillow fights can last from a few minutes to several hours.

== International Pillow Fight Day ==
The largest pillow fight flash mob was the Worldwide Pillow Fight Day (or International Pillow Fight Day) that took place on 22 March 2008. Over 25 cities around the globe participated in the first "international flash mob", which was the world's largest flash mob to date. According to The Wall Street Journal, more than 5,000 participated in New York City, overtaking London's 2006 Silent Disco gathering as the largest recorded flash mob. Word spread via social networking sites, including Facebook, Myspace, private blogs, public forums, personal websites, as well as by word of mouth, text messaging, and email. Participating cities included Atlanta, Beirut, Boston, Budapest, Chicago, Copenhagen, Dublin, Houston, Huntsville, London, Los Angeles, Melbourne, New York City, Paris, Pécs, San Francisco, Shanghai, Stockholm, Sydney, Székesfehérvár, Szombathely, Vancouver, Washington, D.C., and Zurich.

International Pillow Fight Day 2014

== Origins ==
While ordinary pillow fights have existed for a long time, these events are massive in scale, occur in public and are promoted primarily via the internet. Many massive pillow fights have been organized in an effort to break Guinness World Records, but the current record is a pillow fight among 7,861 people achieved by MyPillow, Inc. (USA) in Minneapolis, Minnesota, USA, on 18 May 2018.
