= Pillow Fight League =

Toronto-based semi-professional sports league

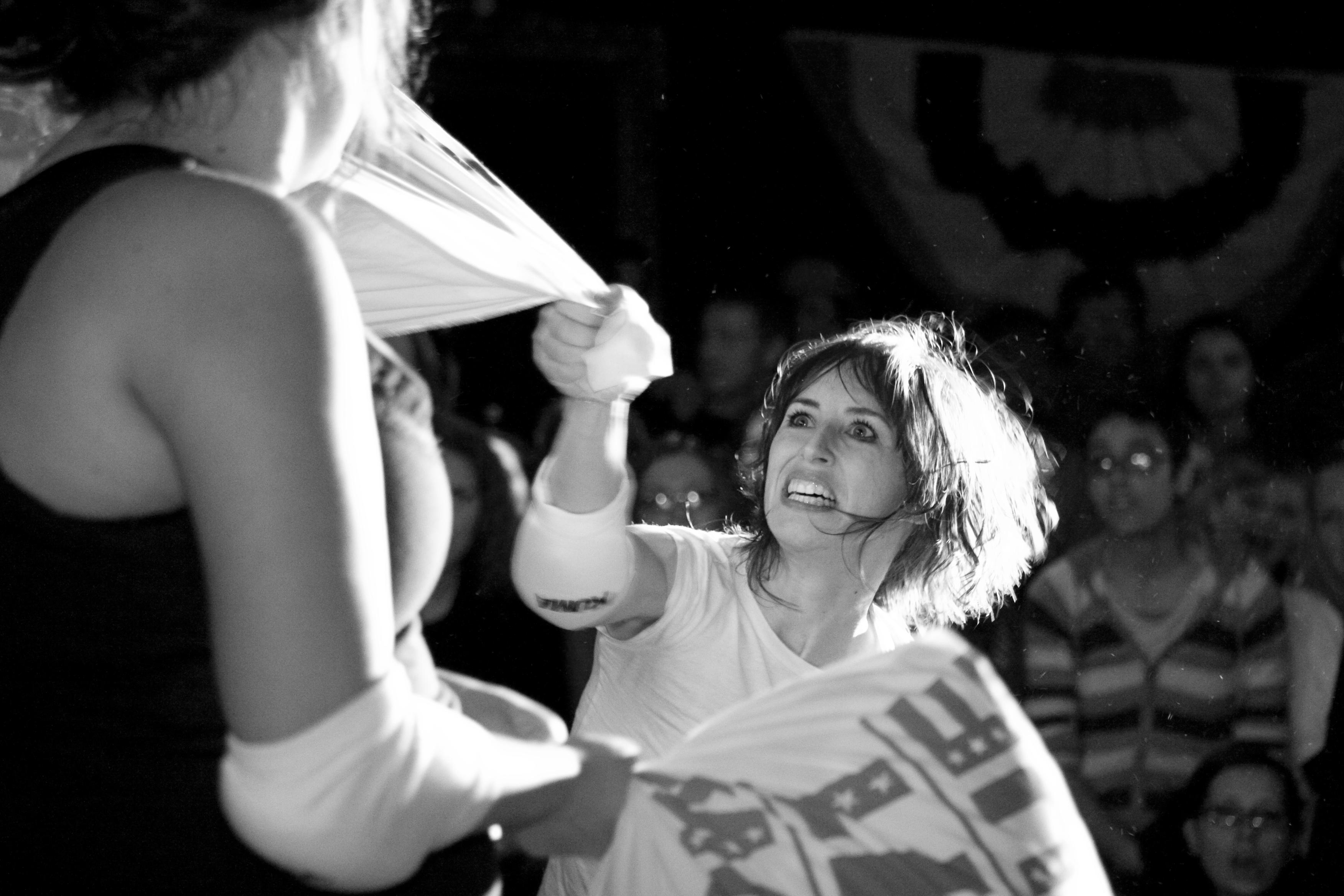
Athletes in the League pillow fights could hit hard enough to cause injury.

The Pillow Fight League (PFL) was a Toronto-based semi-professional sports league centred on public pillow fights. The tongue-in-cheek women's sport was hosted in a fighting arena, much like a boxing or wrestling match.

The League was founded by PFL Commissioner Stacey P. Case, and Honorary PFL Commissioner Craig Daniels in February 2004. The formal league launched at a Canadian goth bar called The Vatikan in downtown Toronto. Events were hosted in both Montreal, Quebec and New York City, but the primary seat of the League remained in Toronto, Ontario.

Fights within the League featured either two or three girls, the latter referred to as a damage à trois, and a codified set of rules. Fighters frequently incurred cuts, scrapes and bruises. There were also more serious injuries, including concussions, black eyes, lost teeth, split lips, torn muscles, and bruised kidneys.

The League grew out of a pair of live events held by performers from Canadian burlesque troupe "Skin Tight Outta Sight" at a performance of Mr. Case's band (named for tijuana bibles) at New Year's Eve 2004 and 2005. The latter featured the first instance of live tryouts for members of the audience. The events that followed in 2006 at the Vatikan launched the new League-sponsored series of events primarily focused around the pillow fighting bouts. A potential moneymaker for its founders, the League saw television rights snapped up in 2007 by reality television and sitcom producers Eddie October (executive producer of Tommy Lee Goes to College and The Roseanne Show) and Al Berman (executive producer of The Biggest Loser and Survivor).

The league ceased operation in 2011 with hopes of a revitalization in 2015. However, the league is still being talked about favourably by past PFL fighters.

== See also ==
- Pillow Fighting Championship
- Chess boxing
- USA Rock Paper Scissors League
