= Winter Hymn Country Hymn Secret Hymn =

Studio album by Do Make Say Think
- Released: October 6, 2003
- Recorded: January–May 2003
- Studio: Rockwood 2 Farmhouse (Rockwood); Th' Schvitz (Toronto); Black Sheep Inn (Wakefield)
- Genre: Post-rock
- Length: 51:59
- Label: Constellation CST025
- Producer: Do Make Say Think

Do Make Say Think chronology
& Yet & Yet (2002)	Winter Hymn Country Hymn Secret Hymn (2003)	You, You're a History in Rust (2007)

Professional ratings
Aggregate scores
Source	Rating
Metacritic	84/100
Review scores
Source	Rating
AllMusic	4.5/5 stars
Drowned in Sound	8/10
Pitchfork	8.1/10
Q	3/5 stars
Stylus Magazine	B+

Winter Hymn Country Hymn Secret Hymn is the fourth album by Canadian post-rock band Do Make Say Think. It was released on October 6, 2003, by Constellation Records.

== Track listing ==
No.	Title	Length
1.	"Fredericia"	9:37
2.	"War on Want"	1:55
3.	"Auberge le Mouton Noir"	7:04
4.	"Outer Inner & Secret"	10:13
5.	"107 Reasons Why"	3:01
6.	"Ontario Plates"	7:02
7.	"Horns of a Rabbit"	4:01
8.	"It's Gonna Rain"	2:09
9.	"Hooray! Hooray! Hooray!"	6:57
Total length:		51:59

- "Outer Inner & Secret", "Horns of a Rabbit", "Fredericia" and "Ontario Plates" recorded January 2003 at the Rockwood 2 Farmhouse in Rockwood, Ontario.
- "Hooray! Hooray! Hooray!", "107 Reasons Why", "War on Want" and "It's Gonna Rain" recorded March–May 2003 at th' Schvitz in Toronto, Ontario.
- "Auberge le Mouton Noir" recorded March 2003 at the Black Sheep Inn in Wakefield, Quebec.

== Personnel ==
=== Do Make Say Think ===
- Ohad Benchetrit — guitar, horns, keys
- Dave Mitchell — drums
- James Payment — drums
- Justin Small — guitar, keys
- Charles Spearin — guitar, bass, horns, keys

=== Additional musicians ===
- Brian Cairn — horns
- Jay Baird — horns
