= Pillow fight =

Mock conflict using pillows as weapons

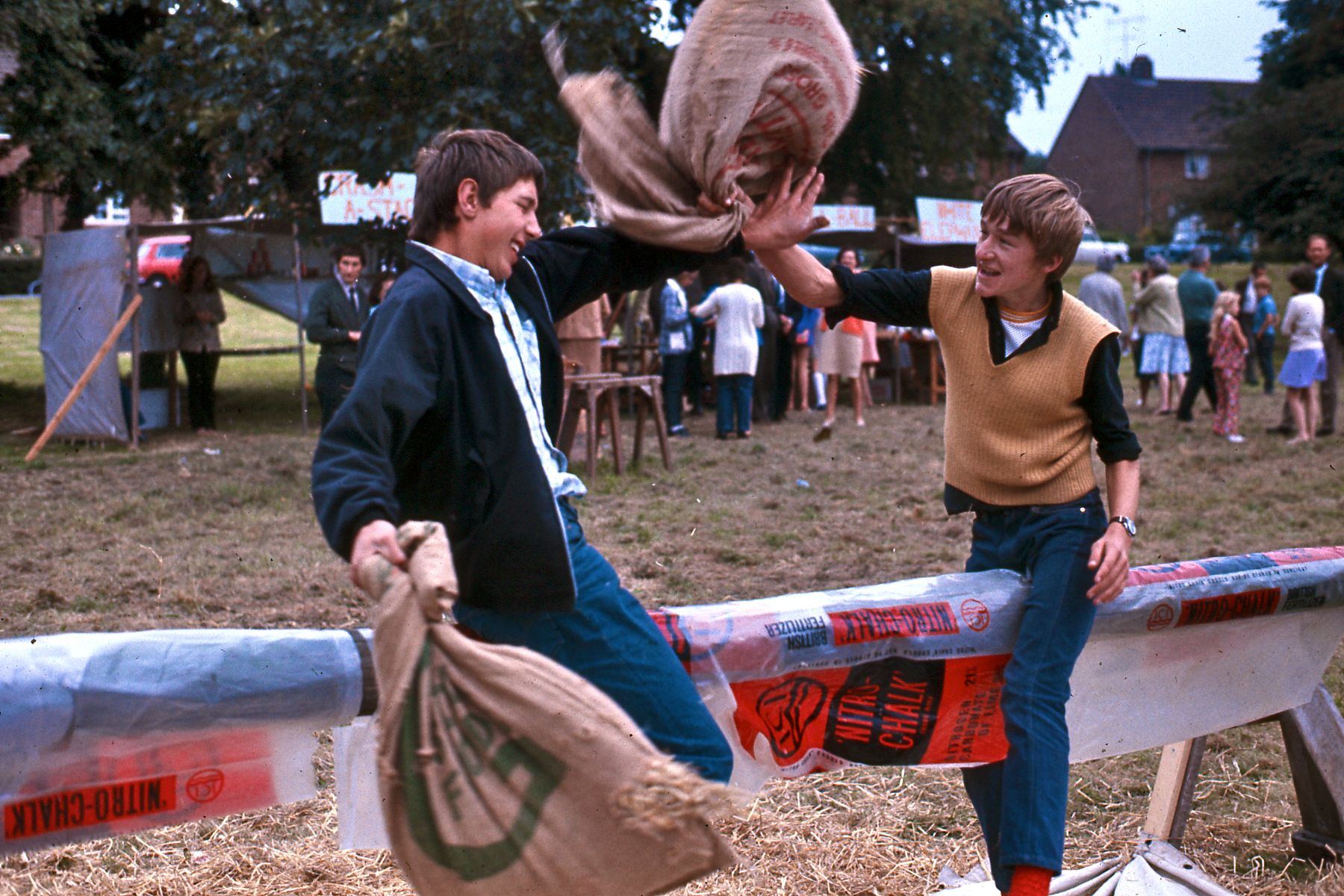
Pillow fight at an English country fair, 1971

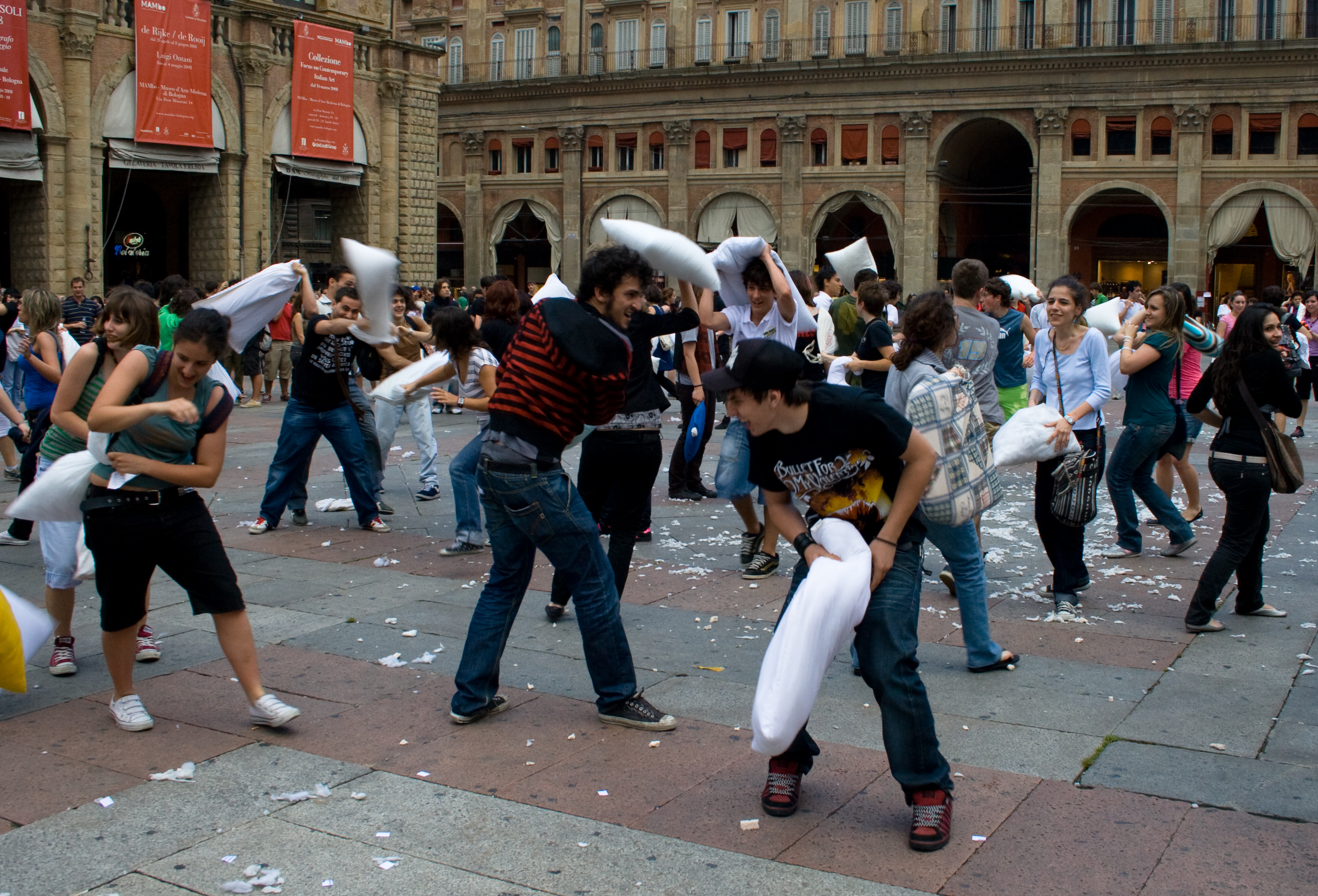
A public pillow fight in Bologna, Italy

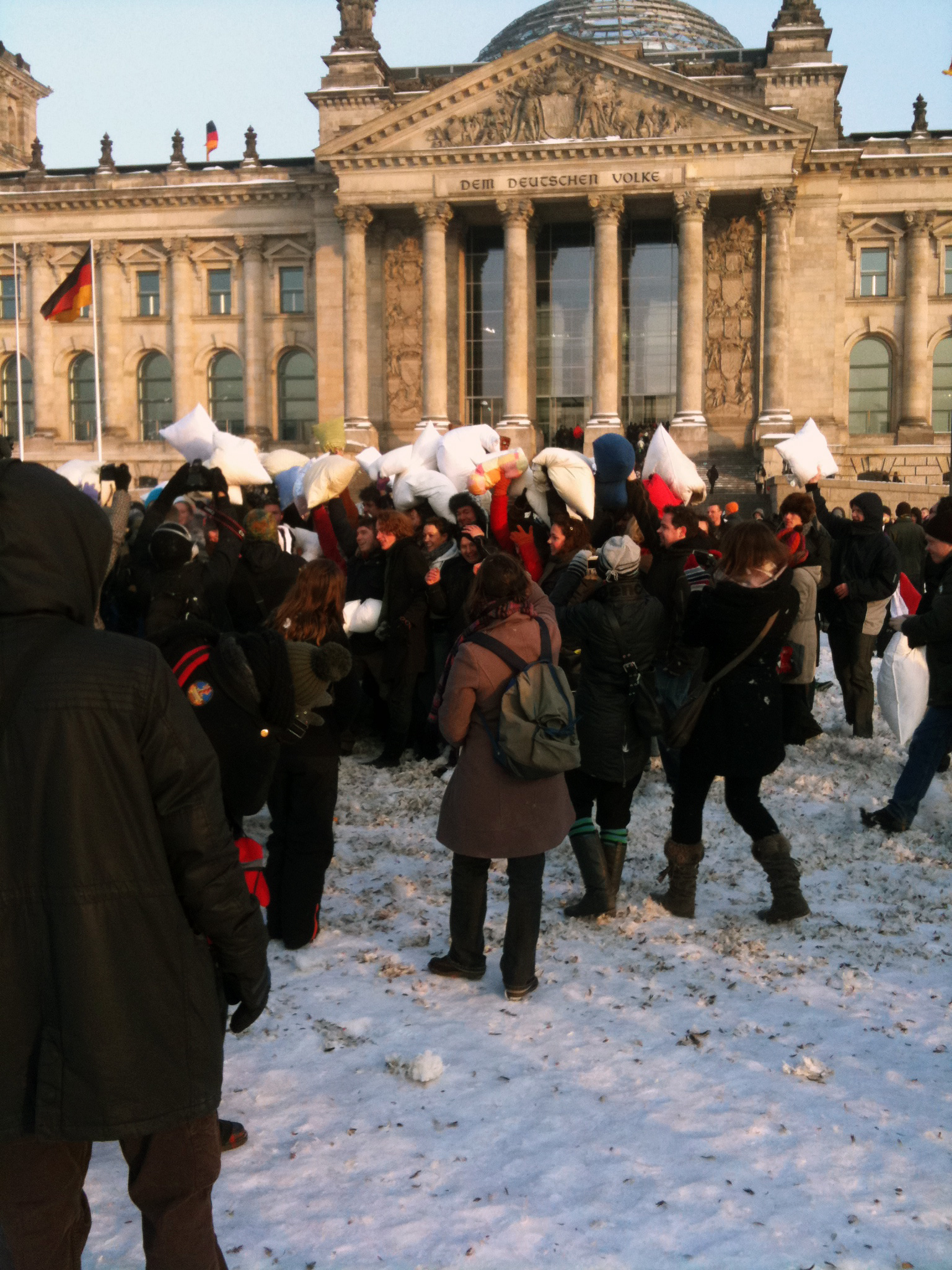
A pillow fight flashmob in Berlin, Germany

A pillow fight is a common game mostly played by young children (but also by teens and adults) in which they engage in mock physical conflict, using pillows as weapons.

Pillow fights often occur during children's sleepovers. Since pillows are usually soft, injuries rarely occur. The heft of a pillow can still knock a young person off balance, especially on a soft surface such as a bed, which is a common venue. In earlier eras, pillows would often break, shedding feathers throughout a room. Modern pillows tend to be stronger and are often filled with a solid block of artificial filling, so breakage occurs far less frequently.

== Organized pillow fights ==
Pillow fighting has become a part of flash mob culture, with pillow fight flash mobs popping up in cities around the world. Social media is frequently used to initiate and advertise public pillow fight events.

World Wrestling Entertainment (WWE), occasionally staged "pillow fight matches" between female wrestlers, then known as Divas, during the early 2000s. These were often booked as Lingerie Pillow Fights, in which women "compete" in lingerie or pajamas, with little or no actual wrestling taking place. The final match of this type was held in 2008.

In January 2007, Reuters reported on a Pillow Fight League that was operating in bars in Toronto. Pre-selected female "fighters" with stage personalities were paid small amounts to stage regular, unscripted fights. The rules called for "no lewd behavior, and moves such as leg drops or tickling or submission holds are allowed as long as a pillow is used." The league ceased operations in 2011, and a crowdfunding campaign created to facilitate its return was unsuccessful.

March 22, 2008, was the first World Pillow Fight Day, a day organized in the United States by Newmindspace, a group created by two University of Toronto students. The Wall Street Journal estimated that 5,000 people participated in a New York event coinciding with the day.

The Guinness World Record for the largest pillow fight was set in July 2015 at a St. Paul Saints baseball game, where 6,261 participated in an event sponsored by local manufacturer My Pillow. The record was later broken in May 2018 at an evangelical Christian concert. 7,861 people participated in the Minneapolis, Minnesota event, which was also sponsored by My Pillow.

September 25, 2021, Gladiatrix LLC, DBA FightPFC.com, Pillow Fight Championships, live streamed their second full card professional pillow fight event. The company announced plans to expand the franchise internationally and to develop pillow fighting as a national sport with standardized rules scoring and equipment. Sports Writer Joe Capozzi reported the event as a "Fierce but wholesome combat sport".

October 5, 2021, NYPost reports that MMA (Mixed Martial Arts) fighters were enjoying the new sport of professional pillow fighting.

== In Japan ==
In Makura-Nage, a Japanese pillow fight variation, players throw pillows instead of swinging them.

== In film ==
The 25-second-long Pillow Fight From Edison Studios

Pillow fights were a popular theme in early cinematography. 1897 saw the release of A Pillow Fight by the American Mutoscope and Biograph Company followed by Pillow Fight from Edison Studios. In the same year Siegmund Lubin released New Pillow Fight. Lubin returned to the subject in 1903 with the film Pillow Fight, Reversed.
