= Valley of the Giants (album) =

Studio album by Valley of the Giants
- Released: February 2004
- Genres: Post-rock, dream pop
- Length: 65:28
- Label: Arts & Crafts
- Producer: Anthony Seck

Professional ratings
Review scores
Source	Rating
AllMusic	link
Pitchfork	5.0/10

Valley of the Giants is the only album by Canadian indie rock supergroup Valley of the Giants. It was released in February 2004 on the record label Arts & Crafts.

== Track listing ==
1. "Claudia & Klaus" – 5:49
2. "Westworld" – 6:26
3. "Cantara Sin Guitara" – 8:05
4. "Beyond the Valley" – 9:59
5. "Waiting to Catch a Bullet" – 10:00
6. "Whaling Tale" – 8:57
7. "Back to God's Country" – 9:16
8. "Bala Bay Inn" – 7:00
