= CIUT-FM =

Radio station at the University of Toronto

Coordinates: 43.66450°N 79.39834°W

- Toronto, Ontario; Canada
- Frequency: 89.5 MHz

Programming
- Format: Campus and community programming

Ownership
- Owner: University of Toronto Community Radio Inc. (registered charity)

History
- First air date: 1966
- Call sign meaning: CI University of Toronto

Technical information
- Class: B
- ERP: 15 kW
- HAAT: 270 metres (890 ft)

Links
- Webcast: Listen Live
- Website: ciut.fm

CIUT-FM is a campus and community radio station owned and operated by the University of Toronto. The station broadcasts live and continuously from the St. George campus in Toronto on the 89.5 FM frequency. Programming can also be heard nationally via channel 826 on Shaw Direct, and over the internet via the CIUT website. The station is financially supported by donations and an undergraduate student levy. CIUT-FM also broadcasts a Punjabi and Urdu language station, Sur Sagar Radio on a Subsidiary Communications Multiplex Operation frequency.

CIUT's studios are located on Tower Road on the St. George campus, while its transmitter is located atop First Canadian Place in Toronto's Financial District.

== History ==
The station began as a closed-circuit broadcaster called Radio Varsity in 1966, later becoming Input Radio, UTR and then CJUT. All these versions of the station were only heard within the confines of the St. George campus of the University of Toronto, thanks to an extensive network of loudspeakers, amplifiers, and cables strung through the extensive underground network of steam tunnels beneath the campus. The station was granted a broadcast license and became CIUT-FM in 1986, and on January 15, 1987, the station's FM broadcasts began to reach a considerably wider range across southern Ontario.

In 1999, CIUT was $150,000 in debt resulting in the student union taking over management, firing two employees, dismissing five volunteers, shortening time slots for other programs and selling late-night time slots to an internet broadcaster.

The next year, the station was sued by one of the dismissed programmers, Eddy Brake, who challenged his dismissal as well as the restructuring. The lawsuit was settled out of court in 2005.

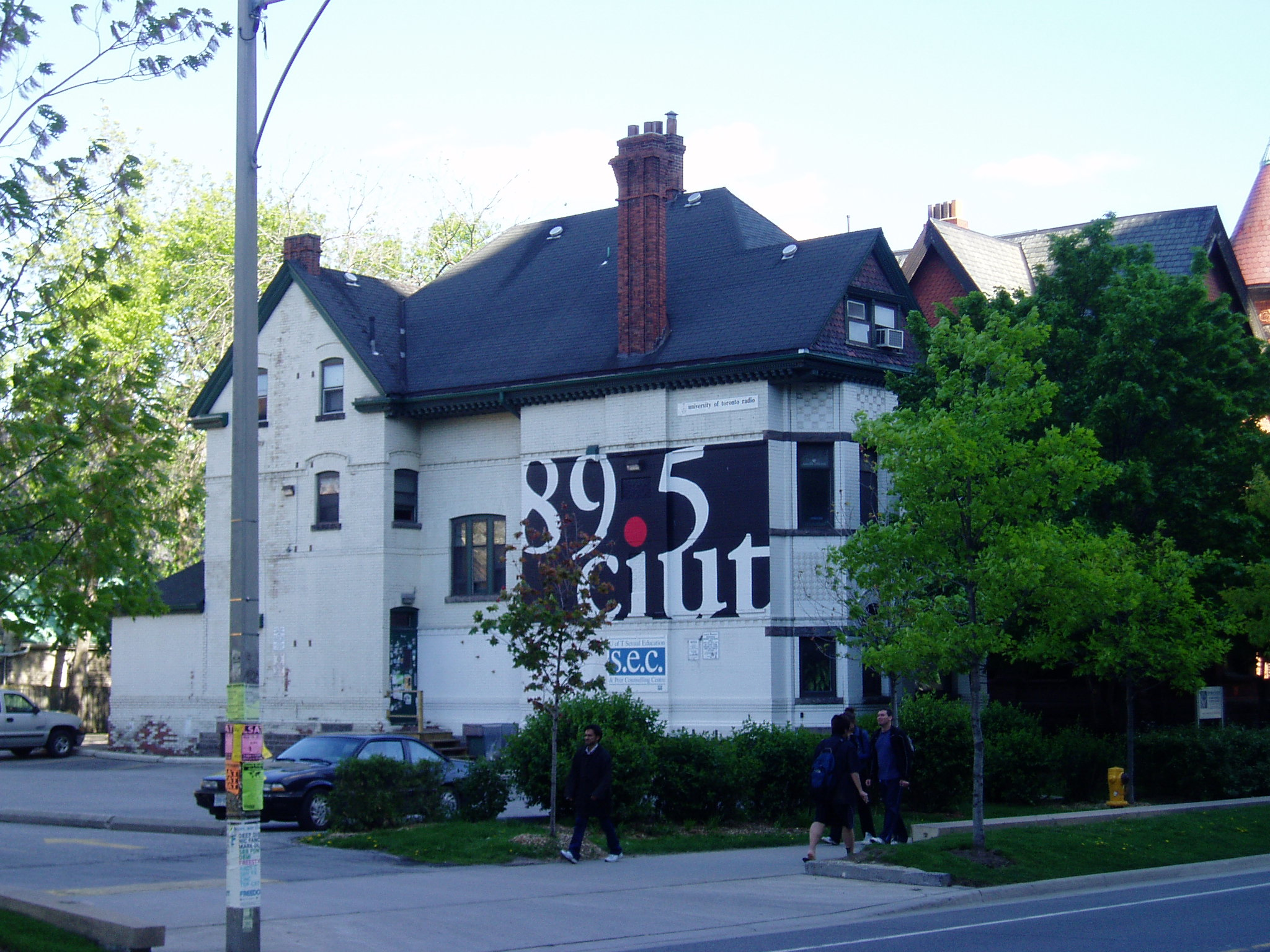
The old headquarters of CIUT-FM at 91 St. George Street, opposite Robarts Library

Today, CIUT broadcasts at 15 kilowatts from a transmitter on the top of First Canadian Place in Downtown Toronto. With greater signal power than generally found at other community radio stations, CIUT's broadcast reaches as far as Barrie to the north, Buffalo to the south, Kitchener to the west and Cobourg to the east.

In 2009, CIUT moved from 91 St. George Street, the Victorian house it had occupied for 40 years, to new studios in Hart House. The old location was demolished in order to make way for the expansion of the Rotman School of Management.

In the fall of 2010, CIUT's board of directors cancelled station manager Brian Burchell's contract due to financial irregularities. As a result, program director Ken Stowar was appointed to the additional role of station manager.

In 2012, CIUT filed a lawsuit against Burchell seeking damages of $162,193.68 for what The Varsity newspaper described as "alleged long-term embezzlement" prior to his firing in October 2010.

In 2014, the CIUT transmitter of 27 years died, shutting the station off the air for a couple of days until a backup transmitter could be shipped to Toronto from Nova Scotia. In the ensuing fundraising drive, money was raised and a new transmitter was installed and operating by August.

== Programming ==
Programs in the spoken word (talk radio) format include: local politics, current events and news; as well as programs focused on Indigenous Peoples, Women in Politics, African Canadian Families, Community Activism, and Health Care.

Musical programming includes many different genres such as folk, classical, Latino, world music, indie, rock, and electronic music. CIUT is the home of The Prophecy, the longest running drum and bass radio show in North America.

Aside from being home to two of the longest running Hip Hop shows in Canada; The Drill Squad & The Masterplan Show, 6 Degrees has been recognized as one of the most influential Hip Hop radio shows in Toronto today. As of July 2025, the Generation Next Radio (The Masterplan Show) has been removed from the lineup by station Manager Ken Stowar.

== Alumni ==
Former Radio Varsity/CIUT talent includes:

- Paul Shaffer; 7T1, well-known musical director, producer, performer, and David Letterman sidekick.
- Jeff Healey; blues guitarist
- Mopa Dean; singer for hardcore punk band Armed and Hammered
- Stacy Case; founder of the Pillow Fight League and amateur film maker
- Lise Waxer; musicologist, professor and author of works about Latin Jazz
- Dave O Rama; Original member of the CIUT FM Music Programming Committee and former member of the Board Of Directors. Former host and producer of the CIUT FM programs The Dream Consortium, Headstrokes and Alligator Wine. Current host and producer of The Lovecast, broadcasting on Saturdays at 4pm on CIUT FM.
- Cheri DiNovo; hosted The Radical Reverend before being elected to the Ontario legislature for the New Democratic Party of Ontario in 2006. Show resumed after she left office in 2017.
- Mike Sullivan; former CBC master control radio operator, elected to Parliament of Canada as New Democratic Party of Canada in 2011.
- Dominic LeBlanc; member of Board Of Directors, later Liberal Party of Canada Member of Parliament since 2000.
- Michelle Marin; DJ, Producer and Host of Ultra Latino radio; Since January 2015
- Jonathan Culp; filmmaker, musician, media artist, and writer

== See also ==
- CKC455
- List of campus radio stations in Canada
- List of radio stations in Ontario
