= Julie Penner =

Canadian violinist (born 1976)

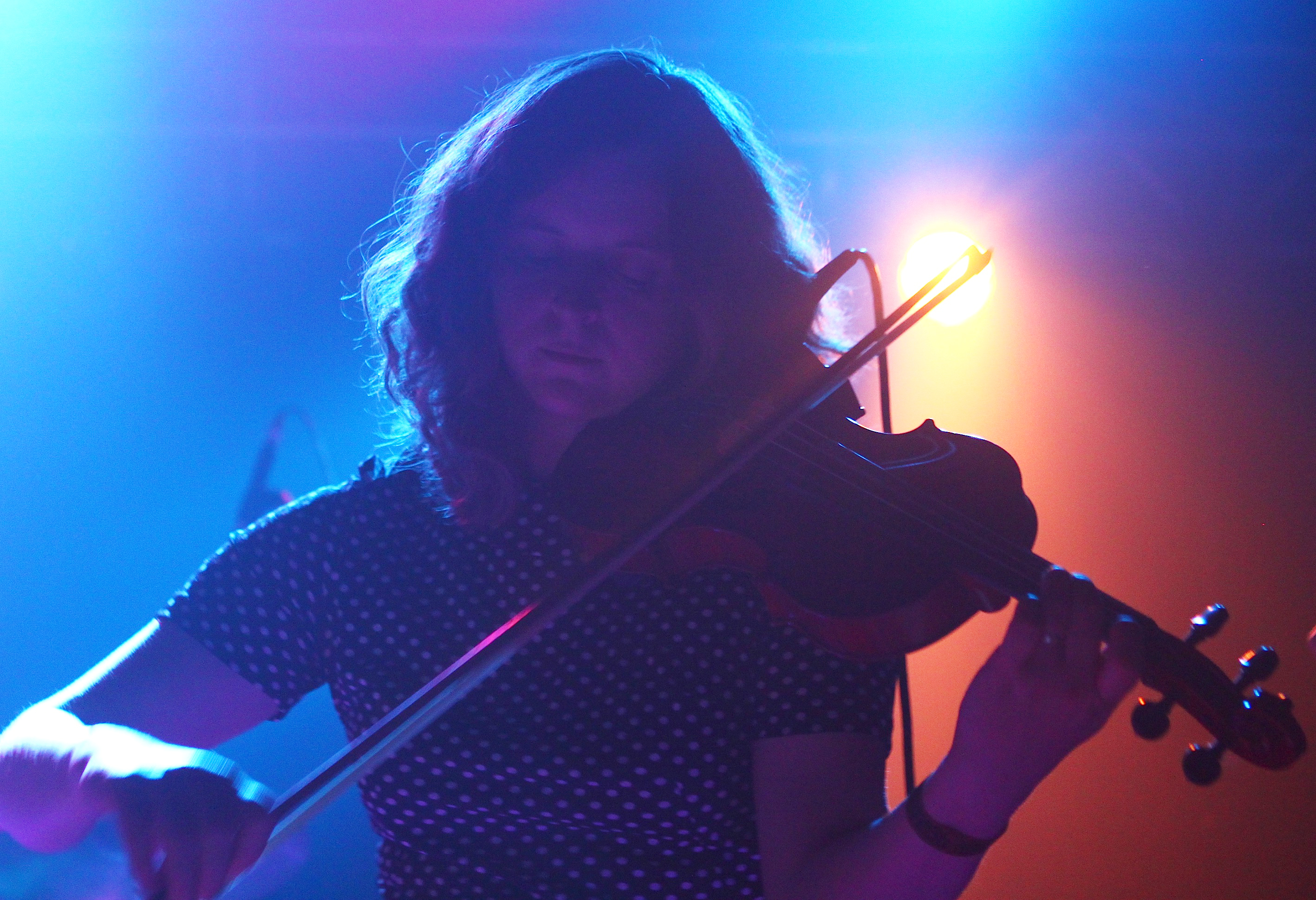
- The Opera House / Toronto, ON / December 7, 2012

Background information
- Born: 1976 (age 49–50); Winnipeg, Manitoba, Canada
- Genre: Indie rock
- Occupation: Violinist
- Instrument: Violin

Julie Penner (born 1976) is a Canadian violinist who has played with The FemBots, Broken Social Scene, Do Make Say Think, Hylozoists, The Lowest of the Low and The Weakerthans. She also worked as the music producer for Stuart McLean's The Vinyl Cafe on CBC Radio until it went on hiatus in 2015.

== History ==
Born in Winnipeg, Manitoba, Penner began classical violin lessons as a preschooler. She quickly showed an aptitude for the instrument and continued improving her skills. At the age of 15, she quit playing the violin for a couple of years, but then took it up again to start a band with her friends. Since then, she estimates she has recorded or performed live with more than 40 different groups.
