= Do Make Say Think =

Canadian post-rock band

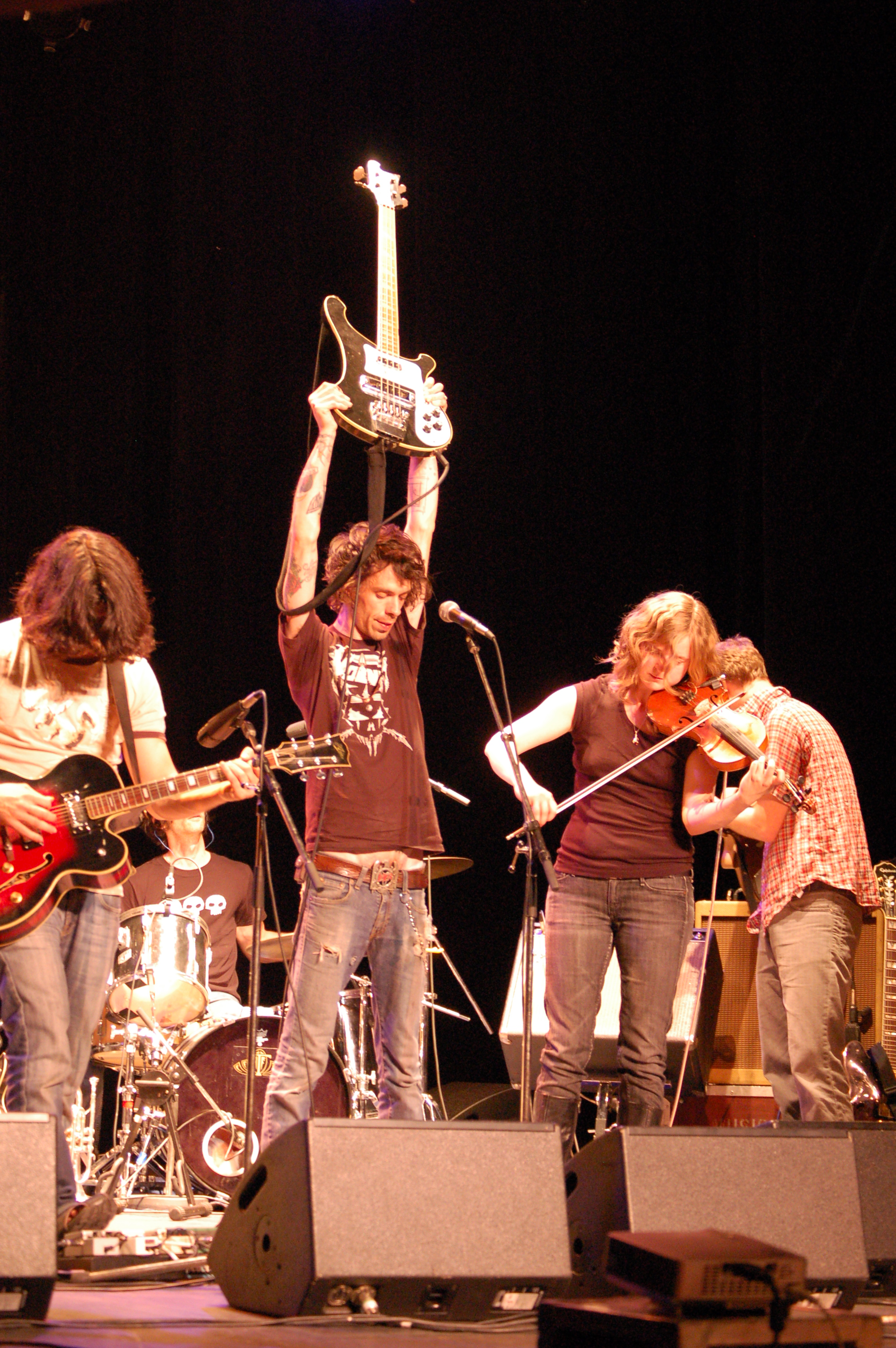
- Do Make Say Think in concert at Art Rock in Saint-Brieuc, Brittany in 2007. From left to right: Ohad Benchetrit, Justin Small, Julie Penner, and Charles Spearin.

Background information
- Origin: Toronto, Ontario, Canada
- Genre: Post-rock
- Years active: 1995–present
- Label: Constellation
- Members: Ohad Benchetrit; David Mitchell; James Payment; Justin Small; Charles Spearin; Julie Penner; Jay Baird
- Past members: Jason Mackenzie; Brian Cram
- Website: www.domakesaythink.com

Do Make Say Think is a Canadian instrumental band formed in Toronto, Ontario in 1995. Their music combines jazz-style drumming, distorted guitars and wind instruments, and prominent bass guitar.

== Biography ==
The band formed in 1995 as a recording project for a Canadian youth dramatic production. They rehearsed for the production in an empty elementary school room. The four simple verbs 'Do', 'Make', 'Say' and 'Think' were painted on walls of the room, and the band adopted them as their name. In 1996, the band progressed as they practiced in the rehearsal room in the basement of the University of Toronto radio station CIUT.

The song "Chinatown" from 2002's & Yet & Yet is featured in the films Syriana, The Corporation, and A Simple Curve.

The band's fifth full-length album, entitled You, You're a History in Rust, was released on Constellation Records in February 2007. The band toured North America and Europe to promote the release of the album, and released a tour EP, The Whole Story of Glory, to promote the Japanese leg of their tour.

In June 2009 at Luminato, Toronto's annual festival of arts and creativity, the band provided part of the live soundtrack for the outdoor screening (at Yonge-Dundas Square (now Sankofa Square) of the 1919 silent German horror film Tales Of The Uncanny (Unheimliche Geschichten), alongside Canadian violinist Owen Pallett and electronica music artist Robert Lippok from Berlin, Germany.

Constellation Records released Do Make Say Think's sixth album, titled Other Truths, in October 2009. Their seventh album, titled Stubborn Persistent Illusions, was released on May 19, 2017. The album won the 2018 Juno Awards for Best Instrumental Album, and Best Artwork.

== Influences ==
Do Make Say Think have cited Talk Talk's Spirit of Eden and Laughing Stock and Mercury Rev, particularly their song "Chasing a Bee", as influences.

== Members ==
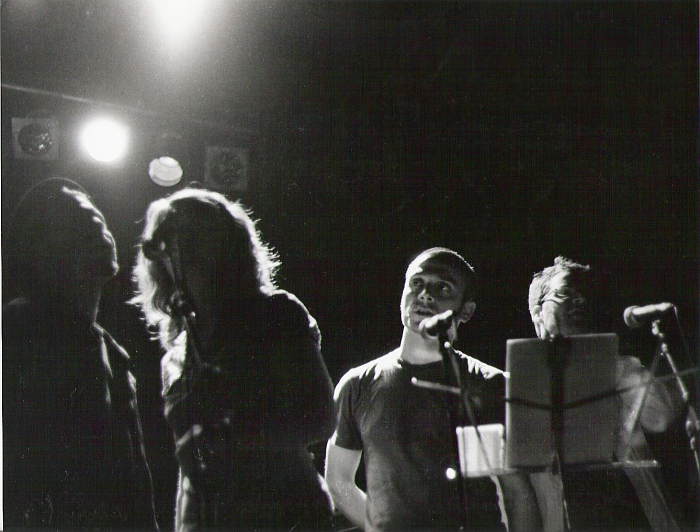
Do Make Say Think performing live at the Phoenix Concert Theatre in Toronto, Ontario, Canada in October 2007.

=== Current members ===
- Ohad Benchetrit – guitar, bass guitar, saxophone, flute
- David Mitchell – drums
- James Payment – drums
- Justin Small – guitar, bass guitar, keyboard
- Charles Spearin – bass guitar, guitar, trumpet, cornet
- Julie Penner – violin, trumpet
- Michael Barth - trumpet
- Adam Marvy - trumpet

=== Previous members ===
- Jason Mackenzie – keyboard, effects (departed after Goodbye Enemy Airship the Landlord Is Dead)
- Jay Baird – saxophone
- Brian Cram – trumpet

== Side projects ==
- Justin Small is also involved in a side project called Lullabye Arkestra as a drummer with his partner and bassist Katia Taylor. They have been produced by Benchetrit who, along with Spearin, records and tours with the Toronto group Broken Social Scene.
- Spearin, Mitchell, and Benchetrit recorded an album together in 1997 under the moniker Microgroove, which put out a limited number of presses of their synthesizer and acoustic drum and bass beat working of jazz forms.
- Benchetrit and Mitchell were also involved in a side project called Sphyr, who released one album, A Poem for M, in 2003. This album is on Fire Records.
- Benchetrit's current solo project is called Years and released a self-titled album under that moniker in 2009.
- Spearin released The Happiness Project in 2009, a collection of interviews with his neighbors set to music. The album was long-listed for the Polaris Prize.
- Benchetrit and Small scored the soundtrack to the 2018 film Braven.

== Discography ==
=== LPs ===
- Do Make Say Think (1999)
- Goodbye Enemy Airship the Landlord Is Dead (2000)
- & Yet & Yet (2002)
- Winter Hymn Country Hymn Secret Hymn (2003)
- You, You're a History in Rust (2007)
- Other Truths (2009)
- Stubborn Persistent Illusions (2017)

=== EPs ===
- Besides (1999)
- The Whole Story of Glory (2008) (Japan-only)

== See also ==
- List of post-rock bands
