= Ohad Benchetrit =

Canadian musician

- Also known as: Years
- Genres: Instrumental rock, post-rock
- Instruments: Guitar, Bass, Saxophone, Flute
- Years active: 1998–present
- Label: Arts & Crafts
- Website: Years

Ohad Benchetrit is a Canadian musician. He plays guitar, bass, saxophone and flute for the post-rock band Do Make Say Think, and has also contributed to albums by Broken Social Scene, Feist, The Hidden Cameras, and Charles Spearin.

He collaborated in a project called Sphyr, which released one album, A Poem for M, in 2003.

Ohad released his first solo record on May 5, 2009 on the Arts & Crafts label under the name Years. Ohad shares score credit for the movie Braven (2018).

== Discography ==
- Years (2009)
