= Choice Cuts: The Capricorn Years 1991–1999 =

Compilation album by Widespread Panic
- Released: July 3, 2007
- Recorded: 1991–1999
- Genre: Rock, Southern rock, jam
- Label: Widespread Records
- Producer: John Keane; Widespread Panic; Johnny Sandlin

Widespread Panic chronology
Earth to America (2006)	Choice Cuts: The Capricorn Years 1991–1999 (2007)	Free Somehow (2008)

Choice Cuts: The Capricorn Years 1991–1999 is a 14-song compilation by American rock band Widespread Panic. Song selections originated from the albums Space Wrangler, Widespread Panic, Everyday, Ain't Life Grand, Bombs & Butterflies, 'Til the Medicine Takes, and the live album Light Fuse, Get Away. Each album was released on Capricorn Records.

== Track listing ==
All tracks by Widespread Panic except where noted.

1. "Travelin' Light" (J. J. Cale) – 3:36
2. "Chilly Water" – 5:40
3. "Love Tractor" – 5:09
4. "Weight of the World" – 4:50
5. "Papa's Home" – 6:40
6. "Ain't Life Grand" – 4:48
7. "Blackout Blues" – 5:17
8. "Rebirtha" – 7:19
9. "Aunt Avis" (Vic Chesnutt) – 3:26
10. "Blue Indian" – 4:52
11. "Climb to Safety" (Music, Jerry Joseph and Glen Esparza Lyrics, Jerry Joseph) – 4:42
12. "Surprise Valley" – 6:15
13. "Pickin' Up the Pieces" – 5:30
14. "Pigeons" – 8:58

== Personnel ==
=== Widespread Panic ===
- John "JB" Bell – vocals, guitar
- Michael Houser – guitar, vocals
- David Schools – bass, vocals
- Todd Nance – drums
- Domingo "Sunny" Ortiz – percussion
- John "JoJo" Hermann – keyboards, vocals
- Tim White – keyboards
- T. Lavitz – keyboards

=== Technical ===
- Producer – John Keane & Widespread Panic (Tracks 1, 2, 13, 14)
- Producer – John Keane (Tracks 6–12)
- Producer – Johnny Sandlin for Duck Tape Music (Tracks 3–5)
- Compilation Producer – Widespread Panic and Darren Salmieri
- Mastered by Mark Wilder at Sony Studios, New York (April 2007)
- Art and Package Design – Chris Bilheimer
- Band Photo – Johnny Buzzerio
- Project Direction – Adam Farber

=== Management ===
- Sam Lanier, Buck Williams (PGA) and Brown Cat – Gomer, Garrie, Ellie, Crumpy, Chris, Larry, Greta and Matt
