= Another Joyous Occasion =

Live album by Widespread Panic
- Released: June 6, 2000
- Recorded: Summer–fall 1999
- Genres: Rock, Southern rock, jam
- Length: 77:11
- Label: Widespread
- Producer: John Keane

Widespread Panic chronology
'Til the Medicine Takes (1999)	Another Joyous Occasion (2000)	Don't Tell the Band (2001)

Professional ratings
Review scores
Source	Rating
AllMusic	2/5 stars

Another Joyous Occasion is the second live album released by the Athens, GA based band Widespread Panic. It was recorded over the summer and fall of 1999, when the band performed shows accompanied by the Dirty Dozen Brass Band. It was the first release on the band's own label, Widespread Records, after leaving Capricorn Records. It was released on June 6, 2000.

The album peaked at No. 161 on the Billboard 200.

== Track listing ==
All songs by Widespread Panic unless otherwise noted.

No.	Title	Writer(s)	Length
1.	"Fishwater"		5:52
2.	"Superstition"	Stevie Wonder	5:41
3.	"Fishwater (Reprise)"		5:57
4.	"Christmas Katie"		6:16
5.	"Behive Jam"		11:37
6.	"Big Chief"	Earl King	7:27
7.	"Drums"		4:09
8.	"Weight Of The World"		7:22
9.	"I Walk On Guilded Splinters"	Dr. John	9:52
10.	"Coconuts"		8:05
11.	"Arleen"	Winston Riley	4:46
Total length:			77:11

== Personnel ==
Widespread Panic

- John Bell – guitar, vocals
- Michael Houser – guitar, vocals
- Todd Nance – percussion, drums, vocals
- Domingo S. Ortiz – percussion
- Dave Schools – bass, percussion, vocals
- John Hermann – keyboards

Other contributors

- John Keane – banjo, pedal steel, keyboards, producer, engineer, mixing
- The Dirty Dozen Brass Band
- Brad Blettenberg – assistant engineer
- Billy Field – mixing
- Dan Friedman – assistant engineer
- Richard Knox – keyboards
- Ken Love – mastering
- Michael Sheehan – photography
- Thomas G. Smith – photography
