= Live in the Classic City =

Live album by Widespread Panic
- Released: June 11, 2002
- Recorded: April 1–3, 2000
- Genre: Rock, Southern rock, jam
- Length: 209:28
- Label: Widespread, Sanctuary
- Producer: Widespread Panic, John Keane

Widespread Panic chronology
Don't Tell the Band (2001)	Live in the Classic City (2002)	Ball (2003)

Professional ratings
Review scores
Source	Rating
AllMusic	4.5/5 stars

Live in the Classic City is the third live album released by American rock band Widespread Panic. The album was recorded over an April 2000 three-night run in their hometown of Athens, Georgia. It was released in June 2002 and features a mix of originals and cover songs, studded with guest performances from other star performers, including Derek Trucks, Bruce Hampton, and former R.E.M. drummer Bill Berry.

The collection revealed the full range of musical styles heard at a Widespread Panic show, from tight hook-laden songs to extended improvisational jams, with seven tracks breaking the ten-minute mark.

The album peaked at No. 99 on both the Billboard 200 and the Top Internet Albums chart. It is one of 10 "live jam releases of this century", according to the August issue of Guitar One.

== Track listing ==
=== Disc one ===
1. "Action Man" (Widespread Panic) – 4:34
2. "Chilly Water" (Widespread Panic) – 4:02
3. "Pleas > Chilly Water" (Widespread Panic) – 12:05
4. "C Brown" (Widespread Panic) – 5:41
5. "Little Lilly" (Widespread Panic) – 8:22
6. "I'm Not Alone" (Widespread Panic) – 6:09
7. "One Arm Steve" (Widespread Panic) – 3:33
8. "Flat Foot Flewzy" (Ferguson) – 5:43
9. "Surprise Valley" (Widespread Panic) – 7:08
10. "Blight" (Schools/Bell/Houser/Chesnutt) – 6:58
11. "Walkin" (Widespread Panic) – 4:56

=== Disc two ===
1. "All Time Low" (Widespread Panic) – 5:00
2. "Mercy" (Widespread Panic) – 9:07
3. "Ride Me High" (Cale) – 16:21
4. "Drums" (Widespread Panic) – 16:35
5. "Time Is Free" (Hampton/Johnson) – 11:39
6. "Climb to Safety" (Joseph) – 8:16
7. "Blue Indian" (Widespread Panic) – 5:39

=== Disc three ===
1. "Bear's Gone Fishin'" (Widespread Panic) – 6:21
2. "Waker" (Widespread Panic) – 3:57
3. "Dyin' Man" (Widespread Panic) – 4:29
4. "Stop and Go" (Widespread Panic) – 10:32
5. "Hatfield" (Widespread Panic) – 12:07
6. "Tall Boy" (Widespread Panic) – 6:01
7. "Red Hot Mama" (Clinton) – 5:48
8. "Worry" (Widespread Panic) – 10:51
9. "Let's Get the Show on the Road" (Stanley) – 7:34

== Personnel ==
Widespread Panic

- John Bell - Guitar, vocals
- John Hermann - Keyboards, vocals
- Michael Houser - Guitar, vocals
- Todd Nance - Drums, vocals
- Domingo S. Ortiz - Percussion
- Dave Schools - Bass

Guest performers

- Randall Bramblett - Saxophone
- Anne Richmond Boston - Vocals
- Col. Bruce Hampton - Vocals
- Pete Jackson - Percussion
- John Keane - Banjo, pedal Steel guitar
- Chuck Leavell - Keyboards
- Count Mbutu - Percussion
- Yonrico Scott - Drums
- Derek Trucks - Guitar
- Charlie Pruet - Percussion
- Bill Berry - Percussion
- Dr. Arvin Scott - Percussion
- Garrie Vereen - Percussion

Production

- John Keane - Producer, mixing
- Billy Field - Engineer, mixing assistant
- Ken Love - Mastering
- Michael K. Sheehan - Photography
