= The Earth Will Swallow You =

Video by Widespread Panic
- Released: April 6, 2002
- Genre: Rock, Southern rock, Jam
- Length: 104 minutes
- Label: Landslide (1988); Capricorn/Warner Bros. (1992, 1994); Zomba/Legacy (2001)
- Producer: Geoffrey Hanson; Christopher Hanson

The Earth Will Swallow You is a film by brothers Geoffrey and Christopher Hanson detailing the summer 2000 tour of Athens, Georgia-based jam band Widespread Panic, though a substantial portion of the film is behind-the-scenes footage of studio sessions, travelling, and interviews.

It includes footage from their performances at larger venues such as the Red Rocks Amphitheatre and San Francisco's Warfield Theater. There are also several clips from smaller venues and impromptu settings (New York City's Central Park). Much of the concert footage highlights their appearances with other artists, including Taj Mahal, the Dirty Dozen Brass Band, Jorma Kaukonen, Merl Saunders, and Cecil "P-Nut" Daniels. Most of these artists are given a brief interview segment as well. Perhaps the real highlights of the film are the rare glimpses into the band's life off the road. Much attention is given to their recording in various studios (John Keane's studio, where many of their albums were recorded, bassist Dave Schools's house), time spent with artists close to the band (Vic Chesnutt, Col. Bruce Hampton), and, more importantly, one-on-one interviews with each member of the group.

== Chapter Index ==
1. Opening Titles
2. TEWSY I
3. Col. Bruce
4. Chilly Water
5. Oade Brother
6. Dave
7. Walking with Tom
8. Driving I
9. TEWSY II
10. Rolling
11. Mikey
12. Rehearsing with Jorma
13. Vermont Radio
14. Arleen
15. North
16. Master Set List
17. Keep on Trekking
18. Dirty Dozen
19. TEWSY III
20. Driving II
21. Set Break
22. Cooking with Taj
23. Genesis
24. Action Man
25. P-Nut
26. Todd
27. Drums
28. Sunny
29. JoJo
30. Merl
31. End of the Show
32. My Last Act
33. Surprise Valley
34. Closing Credits

== Personnel ==
=== Widespread Panic ===
- John Bell
- John "JoJo" Hermann
- Todd Nance
- Domingo S. Ortiz
- Dave Schools
- Michael Houser

=== Guest appearances ===
- David Blackmon
- Eric Carter
- Vic Chesnutt
- Cecil "P-Nut" Daniels
- Dirty Dozen Brass Band
- Col. Bruce Hampton
- Daniel Hutchins
- Jerry Joseph
- Jorma Kaukonen
- Taj Mahal
- Merl Saunders

=== Production ===
- Director – Christopher Hanson
- Producer – Geoffrey Hanson
- Executive producer – Jud Blount
- Co-executive producer – Peter Couhig
- Co-producer – Mitchell Stein
- Associate producers – William Blount, Drew Hamilton, Chris Wilson
- Editor – David Frankel
- Sound mix – John Keane and Andy Kris
- Production manager and marketing coordinator – David Dean
- DVD producers – Geoffrey Hanson and Christopher Hanson
- DVD menus – Sean Sutton and Chicago Recording Company
- Package photography – Garrett Hacking
- Poster art – Jason Clements
- Package design – Mark Berger/Madison House Design
