= Street Dogs (Widespread Panic album) =

Studio album by Widespread Panic
- Released: September 25, 2015
- Recorded: Echo Mountain, Asheville, North Carolina
- Genre: Rock, Southern rock, jam
- Length: 58:42
- Label: Vanguard
- Producer: John Keane, Widespread Panic

Widespread Panic chronology
Wood (2012)	Street Dogs (2015)

Professional ratings
Review scores
Source	Rating
AllMusic	4/5 stars

Street Dogs is the twelfth studio album released by American band Widespread Panic. Recorded at Echo Mountain Recording Studio in Asheville, North Carolina, it was released on September 25, 2015.

This marks the first album by the band without drummer, and founding member, Todd Nance although he does receive co-writing credit on every song. It features Duane Trucks on drums. He was not an official member of the band at the time of its recording but had been performing live with them since late 2014. He joined the band as a full member in February 2016.

Lead singer and guitarist John Bell has said in interviews that much of the album was recorded live in studio, with as little overdubbing as possible.

== Track listing ==
All tracks written by John Bell, John Hermann, Jimmy Herring, Domingo S. Ortiz, Dave Schools, Todd Nance and Duane Trucks except where noted.

1. "Sell Sell" (Alan Price) 6:24
2. "Steven’s Cat" 4:28
3. "Cease Fire" 7:51
4. "Jamais Vu (The World Has Changed)" 7:15
5. "Angels Don’t Sing the Blues" 5:54
6. "Honky Red" (Murray McLauchlan) 6:27
7. "The Poorhouse of Positive Thinking" 5:11
8. "Welcome to My World" (John Keane) 5:52
9. "Tail Dragger" (Willie Dixon) 4:50
10. "Street Dogs for Breakfast" 4:30

== Personnel ==
Widespread Panic

- John Bell – lead vocals, guitar
- Jimmy Herring – guitar
- Domingo S. Ortiz – percussion
- Dave Schools – bass, vocals
- John Hermann – keyboards, vocals

Additional musicians

- Duane Trucks – drums
- John Keane – guitar, vocals

Production

- John Keane – producer, engineer, mixing
- Widespread Panic – producer
- Julian Dreyer – assistant engineer
- Jim Georgeson – assistant engineer
- Clay Miller – assistant engineer
- Glenn Schick – mastering
- Ellie MacKnight – package coordinator
- Andy Tennille – photography
