= Earth to Atlanta =

Video by Widespread Panic
- Released: November 14, 2006
- Genre: Rock, Southern rock, Jam
- Length: 182 minutes
- Label: Landslide (1988); Capricorn/Warner Bros. (1992, 1994); Zomba/Legacy (2001)
- Producer: Blake W. Morrison; Buck Williams; Casey Bennett; Darren Chuckry

Earth to Atlanta is a live DVD concert of the band Widespread Panic filmed at the Fabulous Fox Theater in Atlanta, GA on May 9, 2006. This 2 DVD set features the performance of the band's nationwide simulcast to 115 Regal/Edwards/United Artists cinemas nationwide. This was a companion piece to the 2006 CD release Earth To America. The DVDs were filmed in High Definition/ 5.1 surround sound. The collection features 26 songs, including live versions of “Tall Boy”, “Travelin’ Man”, “Pigeons”, “Time Zones” and “Second Skin.”

== Track listing ==
=== Disc one ===
1. From The Cradle
2. Pigeons
3. Solid Rock
4. Ribs And Whiskey*
5. Crazy
6. Travelin' Man*
7. Vacation*
8. Gradle**
9. Bust It Big**
10. Don't Wanna Lose You*
11. Chainsaw City*

=== Disc two ===
1. Let's Get Down To Business
2. Barstools and Dreamers
3. Driving Song
4. Second Skin***
5. Driving Song
6. May Your Glass Be Filled***
7. Time Zones***
8. Greta**
9. Drums
10. You Should Be Glad**
11. Goodpeople**
12. Tall Boy**

=== Extras/Encore ===
1. None of Us Are Free*
2. City of Dreams*
3. Walkin' (For Your Love)*

Note:
John Keane* – Guitar, Pedal Steel
Randall Bramblett** – Saxophone, Vocals
Karen Freer*** – Cello

All songs are written by Widespread Panic and published by Brian Delay or Widespread Music/BMI
Except:

- "From the Cradle" – written by WP and William Tonks; published by Brian Delay LLC/BMI
- "Solid Rock" – written by Bob Dylan; published by Special Rider Music/ASCAP
- "Travelin' Man" – written by Michael Houser; published by Door Harp Music/BMI
- "Chainsaw City" – written by Jerry Joseph; published by Pampoon Publishing/BMI
- "Let's Get Down to Business" – written by Vic Chesnutt; published by Ghetto Bells Music/BMI
- "Second Skin" and "Time Zones" – written by WP and Jerry Joseph; published by Brian Delay
- "None of Us Are Free" – written by Brenda Russell, and Cynthia Weil, Barry Mann; published by Wixen Music/Dyad Music Ltd. and Universal-Geffen Music and Rutland Road Music
- "City of Dreams" – written by David Byrne; published by RZO/Index Music

== Personnel ==
=== Widespread Panic ===
- John Bell – vocals, guitar
- John "JoJo" Hermann – keyboards, vocal
- John Keane – guitar, pedal steel
- George McConnell – guitar, vocals
- Todd Nance – drums, vocals
- Domingo S. Ortiz – percussion, vocals
- David Schools – bass, vocals

=== Special guests ===
- Randall Bramblett** – saxophone, vocals (Courtesy of New West Records)
- Kevin Hyde – trombone
- Wayne Postell – trumpet
- Tom Ryan – baritone sax
- Karen Freer*** – cello
- Reid Harris – viola
- Jun-Ching Lin – violin
- Elizabeth Murphy – cello
- Paul Murphy – viola
- Sou-Chun Su – violin

=== Technical ===
- Eric Cochran – director
- Blake W. Morrison – producer
- Buck Williams – executive producer
- Casey Bennett – executive producer
- Darren Chuckry – executive producer
- Bryan Walters – line producer
- Chris Osterhus – editors
- Don Pollard – editors
- Audio Produced by Terry Manning & Widespread Panic
- Music Recorded and Mix in 5.1 Surround Sound & Stereo by Gary Lux (Bennett Music Studios)
- Assisted by Michael Jesmer & Jason Kemp
- Mastered by Gary Lux
