= Live Wood (Widespread Panic album) =

Live album by Widespread Panic
- Released: April 21, 2012
- Genre: Rock, southern rock, jam
- Label: Widespread Records
- Producer: Widespread Panic

Widespread Panic chronology
Live in the Classic City II (2010)	Live Wood (2012)	Wood (2012)

Live Wood is the twentieth album by the Athens, Georgia-based band Widespread Panic. It is their ninth official live album release and was released on the band's Widespread Records imprint on vinyl only for Record Store Day, April 21, 2012.

== Track listing ==
1. "Blue Indian" (Widespread Panic)
2. "Degenerate" (Vic Chesnutt)
3. "Tall Boy" (Widespread Panic)
4. "The Ballad of John and Yoko" (John Lennon, Paul McCartney)
5. "Tail Dragger" (Willie Dixon)
6. "Fishing" (Widespread Panic)
7. "Many Rivers to Cross" (James E. Chambers)

== Personnel ==
- John Bell – Guitar (Acoustic), Guitar (Resonator), Vocals
- Jimmy Herring – Guitar (Acoustic)
- Todd Nance – Drums, Vocals
- Domingo S. Ortiz – Percussion
- Dave Schools – Bass (Acoustic), Vocals
- John Hermann – Harmonium, Melodica, Piano, Pump Organ, Toy Piano, Vocals

John Keane – Guitar (Acoustic), Guitar (Pedal Steel)
