= Don't Tell the Band =

Studio album by Widespread Panic
- Released: June 19, 2001
- Recorded: 2000
- Genre: Rock, Southern rock, jam
- Length: 82:33
- Label: Widespread, Sanctuary
- Producer: John Keane, Widespread Panic

Widespread Panic chronology
Another Joyous Occasion (2000)	Don't Tell the Band (2001)	Live in the Classic City (2002)

Professional ratings
Review scores
Source	Rating
AllMusic	4/5 stars
Rolling Stone	(Not Rated)

Don't Tell the Band, is the seventh studio album released by the Athens, GA based band Widespread Panic. It was released on June 19, 2001, in two forms, a single disc and a double disc release. It was the second release through the band's own label, Widespread Records, in conjunction with UK-based label Sanctuary Records. The album covered a wide variety of styles, from rock to Latin and grunge to soul, yet did not depart from this jam band's signature sound.

Randall Bramblett, a solo musician and member of Steve Winwood's touring band, joined Widespread Panic on the tenor saxophone for a cover of Firehose's "Sometimes". "Big Wooly Mammoth", a long-time crowd favorite sung by John "JoJo" Herman, was finally brought to the studio for this release. Unknown at the time, this would be Michael Houser's last studio album with Widespread Panic, before his cancer-related death in 2002.

Songs from disc two comprise the first five tracks of the band's June 2002 release Live in the Classic City and are from the opening of the band's April 1, 2000, performance at the Classic Center Theater in Athens, GA. Track 1, "Action Man," appears in its original instrumental form unlike the album version, which contains lyrics. The songs "Action Man" and "Give" appeared in the EA Sports video game NASCAR 2001.

The album peaked at No. 57 on the Billboard 200. It peaked at No. 12 on the Top Internet Albums chart.

== Track listing ==
All songs by Widespread Panic unless otherwise noted.

Disc one
No.	Title	Writer(s)	Length
1.	"Little Lilly"		05:07
2.	"Give"		03:29
3.	"Imitation Leather Shoes"		04:15
4.	"This Part of Town"		05:20
5.	"Sometimes"	Ed Crawford	03:32
6.	"Thought Sausage"		04:39
7.	"Down"		03:52
8.	"Big Wolly Mammoth/Tears of a Woman"		06:45
9.	"Casa del Grillo"		06:30
10.	"Old Joe"		03:50
11.	"Action Man"		04:30
12.	"Don't Tell the Band"		04:11
Total length:			56:06

Disc two
No.	Title	Guest	Length
1.	"Action Man"		04:25
2.	"Chilly Water, Part I"		04:02
3.	"Pleas"		09:34
4.	"Chilly Water, Part II"		02:29
5.	"C. Brown"	John Keane, Pedal Steel Guitar	05:55
Total length:			26:27

== Personnel ==
Widespread Panic

- John Bell – guitar, vocals
- John Hermann – keyboards, vocals
- Michael Houser – guitars, vocals
- Todd Nance – drums, vocals
- Domingo S. Ortiz – percussion
- Dave Schools – bass

Guest Performers

- Randall Bramblett – tenor sax on "Sometimes"
- John Keane – pedal steel guitar on "This Part of Town", additional guitar noises on "Casa Del Grillo"

Production

- John Keane – engineer, Mixing
- Ken Love – mastering
- Doug Trantow – engineer, Mixing
- Flournoy Holmes – artwork, Design
