= Everyday (Widespread Panic album) =

Studio album by Widespread Panic
- Released: March 9, 1993
- Recorded: November 1992
- Genre: Rock, southern rock, jam
- Length: 59:42
- Label: Capricorn/Warner Bros. (1993,1994); Zomba (2001)
- Producer: John Keane; Johnny Sandlin

Widespread Panic chronology
Widespread Panic (1991)	Everyday (1993)	Ain't Life Grand (1994)

Professional ratings
Review scores
Source	Rating
AllMusic	3/5 stars

Everyday is the third studio album by the Athens, GA based band Widespread Panic. It was released by Capricorn Records and Warner Bros. Records on March 3, 1993. It would later be re-released in 2001 by Zomba Music Group. On July 3, 2014, the band announced that Everyday would be reissued on vinyl on August, 2014. The reissue will be distributed via ThinkIndie distribution and sold only at participating independent record stores.

Beginning on November 5, 1992, the band recorded the album at Muscle Shoals Sound Studio in Sheffield, AL. They were in the studio for roughly 5 weeks.

The album reached a peak position of No. 184 on the Billboard 200 chart and No. 10 on the Heatseekers chart.

The album was the group's first to feature bandmate John Hermann. The album cover features the then-unknown actress and model Angelina Jolie.

== Track listing ==
All tracks written by Widespread Panic, except where noted.

1. "Pleas" – 5:07
2. "Hatfield" – 6:50
3. "Wondering" – 3:56
4. "Papa's Home" – 6:42
5. "Diner" – 7:25
6. "Better Off" (T Lavitz, Widespread Panic) – 5:05
7. "Pickin' Up the Pieces" – 4:26
8. "Henry Parsons Died" (comp. Eric Carter, Daniel Hutchens) – 4:36
9. "Pilgrims" – 6:30
10. "Postcard" (comp. Thomas Guenther & Widespread Panic) – 4:27
11. "Dream Song" – 4:50

== Personnel ==
Widespread Panic

- John Bell – vocals, guitar
- John Hermann – keyboards, chicken
- Michael Houser – guitar, vocals
- Todd Nance – drums
- Domingo S. Ortiz – percussion
- Dave Schools – bass, vocals

Additional musicians

- Hampton Dempster – accompanying vocal on "Pleas"
- Matt Mundy – mandolin on "Pickin' up the Pieces"
- Daniel Hutchens – accompanying vocal on "Henry Parsons Died"

Production

- Johnny Sandlin – producer, engineer, mixing
- Jim Bickerstaff – engineer, mixing
- Alan Schulman – engineer
- Johnny Walls – assistant engineer
- Kent Bruce – assistant engineer, mixing assistant
- Benny Quinn – mastering
- Deborah Norcross – artwork
- Alastair Thain – photography
- Angelina Jolie – album cover and CD model

== See also ==
- Muscle Shoals, Alabama
- Muscle Shoals Sound Studios
