= Über Cobra =

Live album by Widespread Panic
- Released: July 13, 2004
- Recorded: November 2003
- Genre: Rock, Southern rock, jam
- Label: Widespread, Sanctuary
- Producer: Widespread Panic, John Keane

Widespread Panic chronology
Night of Joy (2004)	Über Cobra (2004)	Jackassolantern (2004)

Professional ratings
Review scores
Source	Rating
AllMusic	link
Rolling Stone	link

Über Cobra is the fifth live album released by the Athens, GA based band Widespread Panic. The album was recorded during a show in November 2003 in Myrtle Beach. It was released on July 12, 2004, and was the second of three live releases in 2004 by the band. The album is almost exclusively acoustic, with four guest tracks by John Keane on pedal steel. The album presents the entire first set performed at the House of Blues in Myrtle Beach, SC on November 8, 2003, in sequence. It can be paired with the second set that would subsequently be released as their album Live at Myrtle Beach to complete the full concert.

The album peaked at No. 158 on both the Billboard 200 and the Top Internet Albums chart.

== Track listing ==
1. "Walk On" (Young) – 5:59
2. "Wonderin'" (Widespread Panic) – 4:34
3. "Can't Get High" (Hutchens, Carter) – 3:58
4. "Party at Your Mama's House" (Widespread Panic) – 6:01
5. "Nobody's Loss" (Widespread Panic) – 5:44
6. "City of Dreams" (Byrne) – 6:23
7. "Geraldine & the Honey Bee" (Ramsey) – 3:43
8. "Expiration Day" (Chesnutt) – 5:25
9. "Mercy" (Widespread Panic) – 5:42
10. "Imitation Leather Shoes" (Widespread Panic) – 4:36
11. "Can't Find My Way Home" (Winwood) – 5:18
12. "Papa Johnny Road" (Widespread Panic) – 5:36

== Personnel ==
Widespread Panic

- John Bell – guitar, vocals
- John Hermann – keyboards, vocals
- George McConnell – guitar, vocals
- Todd Nance – drums, vocals
- Domingo S. Ortiz – percussion
- Dave Schools – bass

Guest Performers

- John Keane – pedal steel

Production

- John Keane – producer, mixing
- Billy Field – engineer
- Ken Love – mastering
- Brad Blettenberg – assistant
- Flournoy Holmes – artwork, design, photography
- Ellie MacKnight – package coordinator
- Oade Brothers – assistant
- Chris Rabold – assistant

== Charts ==
Chart (2008)	Peak position
US Billboard 200	158
