= 'Til the Medicine Takes =

Studio album by Widespread Panic
- Released: July 27, 1999
- Recorded: January 1999
- Genres: Rock, Southern rock, jam
- Length: 54:59
- Labels: Capricorn (1998); Zomba (2001)
- Producer: John Keane

Widespread Panic chronology
Light Fuse, Get Away (1998)	'Til the Medicine Takes (1999)	Another Joyous Occasion (2000)

Professional ratings
Review scores
Source	Rating
AllMusic	4/5 stars
Rolling Stone	3/5 stars

'Til the Medicine Takes is the sixth studio album by the Athens, GA-based band Widespread Panic. The album's name refers to a line in the chorus of the fourth track, "Blue Indian". It was released by Capricorn Records on July 27, 1999. It was re-released in 2001 by Zomba Music Group.

The band once again recorded at John Keane's studio in Athens. The guests included the Dirty Dozen Brass Band, the gospel singer Dottie Peoples, and the vocalist Anne Richmond Boston. It was the band's last record as part of the six-album deal with Capricorn.

The album reached a peak position of No. 68 on the Billboard 200.

== Track listing ==
All songs by Widespread Panic unless otherwise noted.

No.	Title	Writer(s)	Length
1.	"Surprise Valley"		6:15
2.	"Bear's Gone Fishin'"		4:23
3.	"Climb to Safety"	Jerry Joseph, Glen Esparanza	4:41
4.	"Blue Indian"		4:54
5.	"The Waker"		3:43
6.	"Party at Your Mama's House"		5:01
7.	"Dyin' Man"		4:34
8.	"You'll Be Fine"		3:17
9.	"One Arm Steve"		3:26
10.	"Christmas Katie"		5:29
11.	"All Time Low"		4:13
12.	"Nobody's Loss"		4:58
Total length:			54:59

== Personnel ==
- John Bell – Vocals, Guitar
- John Hermann – Keyboards, Vocals
- Michael Houser – Guitar, Vocals
- Todd Nance – Drums, Vocals
- Domingo S. Ortiz – Percussion
- Dave Schools – Basses, Acid Loop

Guest musicians

- Anne Richmond Boston – Background Vocals
- Colin Butler – Turntables
- Efrem Towns, Kevin Harris, Roger Lewis, Julius McKee, Gregory Davis, Corey Henry – Horns
- Josh Hauser – Trombone
- Dave Henry. Ned Henry – Strings
- John Keane – Pedal Steel Guitar, Banjo, Keyboards
- Dottie Peoples – Vocals

Production

- John Keane – producer, engineer, mixing
- Matt Coby – assistant engineer
- David Farrell – engineer
- Rob Haddock – assistant engineer
- Flournoy Holmes – artwork, art direction, design, photography
- Ted Jensen – mastering
- Bradshaw Leigh – engineer
- Joel Morris – sheet music
- Jim Scott – mixing
