= Bombs & Butterflies =

Studio album by Widespread Panic
- Released: February 4, 1997
- Recorded: July – August 1996
- Genre: Rock, Southern rock, jam
- Length: 49:20
- Label: Capricorn (1997); Zomba (2001)
- Producer: John Keane

Widespread Panic chronology
Ain't Life Grand (1994)	Bombs & Butterflies (1997)	Light Fuse, Get Away (1998)

Professional ratings
Review scores
Source	Rating
AllMusic	2.5/5 stars

Bombs & Butterflies is the fifth studio album by the Athens, Georgia-based band Widespread Panic. The band started recording the album in July 1996 at John Keane's studio in Athens. The band held a CD release party at Morton Theatre in Athens, one day prior to their Fox Theatre New Year's Eve run on December 28, 1996. It was first released by Capricorn Records on February 4, 1997. It would be re-released in 2001 by Zomba Music Group.

On June 19, 1997, the band performed "Aunt Avis" on Late Night with Conan O'Brien. On June 21, the music video for "Aunt Avis", directed by Billy Bob Thornton, premiered on VH1. The video had been filmed in April 1997 and featured Athens singer-songwriter Vic Chesnutt, who wrote the song.

The album reached a peak position of #50 on the Billboard 200 chart. The track "Hope in a Hopeless World" was a hit on rock radio, charting at #13 on the Billboard Mainstream Rock Tracks in 1997. It is the band's biggest hit to date.

== Track listing ==
All tracks by Widespread Panic

1. "Radio Child" – 4:21
2. "Aunt Avis" (Vic Chesnutt) – 3:26
3. "Tall Boy" – 4:24
4. "Gradle" – 4:23
5. "Glory" – 3:45
6. "Rebirtha" – 7:19
7. "You Got Yours" – 5:25
8. "Hope in a Hopeless World" (Bob Thiele Jr. / Phil Roy) – 5:15
9. "Happy" – 4:56
10. "Greta" – 6:06

== Personnel ==
- John Bell - guitar, vocals
- Michael Houser - guitar, vocals
- Todd Nance - percussion, drums, vocals
- Domingo S. Ortiz - percussion
- Dave Schools - bass, percussion, vocals
- John Hermann - keyboards, vocals

=== Production ===
- Chad Brown - mixing assistant
- Vic Chesnutt - vocals
- John Keane - guitar, pedal steel, producer, engineer, mixing
- Clif Norrell - mixing
- Diane Painter - art direction, design
- John Ritter - design, illustrations
- Nitin Vakukul - photography
