= Night of Joy =

Live album by Widespread Panic
- Released: March 23, 2004
- Recorded: 2003
- Genre: Rock, Southern rock, jam, neo-psychedelia
- Length: 1:18:27
- Label: Widespread, Sanctuary
- Producer: Widespread Panic, John Keane

Widespread Panic chronology
Ball (2003)	Night of Joy (2004)	Über Cobra (2004)

Professional ratings
Review scores
Source	Rating
AllMusic	3/5 stars

Night of Joy is the fourth live album released by the Athens, GA-based band Widespread Panic. The album was recorded during a show in 2003 at the House of Blues in South Carolina. It was released on March 23, 2004, and features the Dirty Dozen Brass Band.

The album peaked at No. 157 on both the Billboard 200 and the Top Internet Albums chart.

== Track listing ==
1. "Thought Sausage" (Widespread Panic) – 5:31
2. "Thin Air" (Widespread Panic) – 7:50
3. "Use Me" (Withers) – 8:27
4. "Bayou Lena" (Widespread Panic) – 6:41
5. "Old Neighborhood" (Widespread Panic) – 6:20
6. "Bust It Big" (Widespread Panic) – 9:05
7. "Arleen" (Riley) – 10:22
8. "I Wish" (Wonder) – 6:56
9. "Rebirtha" (Widespread Panic) – 17:15

== Personnel ==
Widespread Panic

- John Bell – guitar, vocals
- John Hermann – keyboards, vocals
- George McConnell – guitar, vocals
- Todd Nance – drums, vocals
- Domingo S. Ortiz – percussion
- Dave Schools – bass

Guest Performers

- Revert Andrews – trombone
- Kevin Bruce Harris – sax (tenor)
- Terence Higgins – percussion, drums
- Roger Lewis – sax (baritone, soprano)
- Julius McKee – sousaphone
- Efrem Towns – trumpet, flugelhorn

Production

- John Keane – producer, mixing
- Billy Field – engineer
- Ken Love – mastering
- Brad Blettenberg – assistant
- Flournoy Holmes – artwork, design, photography
- Ellie MacKnight – package coordinator
- Oade Brothers – assistant
- Chris Rabold – assistant
- Tom L. Smith – photography
