= Live in the Classic City II =

Live album by Widespread Panic
- Released: September 28, 2010
- Genre: Rock, southern rock, jam
- Label: Widespread; ATO Records
- Producer: Widespread Panic; John Keane

Widespread Panic chronology
Dirty Side Down (2010)	Live in the Classic City II (2010)	Live Wood (2012)

Professional ratings
Review scores
Source	Rating
Allmusic	link

Live in the Classic City II is the eighth live album released by the Athens, GA based band Widespread Panic. The album was recorded during a three-night run that took place April 1–3, 2000 at The Classic Center in Athens, GA. It was released on September 28, 2010.

== Track listing ==
=== Disc one ===
1. "Travelin' Light" (J.J. Cale) – 6:16
2. "Machine" (Widespread Panic) – 3:15
3. "Barstools and Dreamers" (Widespread Panic) – 11:45
4. "This Part of Town" (Widespread Panic) – 5:17
5. "Sleeping Man" (Vic Chesnutt) – 6:37
6. "Radio Child" (Widespread Panic) – 5:32
7. "Imitation Leather Shoes" (Widespread Panic) – 4:48

=== Disc two ===
1. "Disco" (Widespread Panic) – 4:47
2. "Rebirtha" (Widespread Panic) – 12:43
3. "Greta" (Widespread Panic) – 10:22
4. "E on a G" (Widespread Panic) – 6:18
5. "You'll Be Fine" (Widespread Panic) – 3:35
6. "Big Wooly Mammoth" (Widespread Panic) – 6:15
7. "Fishwater" (Widespread Panic) – 11:24
8. "Success Yourself" (Daniel Hutchens) – 5:37
9. "End of the Show" (Daniel Hutchens & Eric Carter) – 6:44

== Personnel ==
Widespread Panic

- John Bell – guitar, vocals
- John Hermann – keyboards, vocals
- Michael Houser – guitar
- Todd Nance – drums, vocals
- Domingo S. Ortiz – percussion
- Dave Schools – bass

Guest performers

- John Keane – pedal steel
- Dr. Arvin Scott – percussion
- Anne Richmond Boston – vocals
- Daniel Hutchens – vocals
- Eric Carter – guitar
- Mike Mills – keyboard
- Wade Hester – guitar

Production

- John Keane – producer, mixing
- Billy Field – engineer
- Ken Love – mastering
- Danny Friedman – assistant engineer
- Brad Blettenberg – assistant engineer
- Chris Bilheimer – art direction
- Michael Sherhan – photography
- Eve Kakassy – photography
- Ellie MacKnight – package coordinator

== Charts ==
Chart (2008)	Peak position
US Independent Albums (Billboard)	37
