= Jackassolantern =

Live album by Widespread Panic

Live album by Widespread Panic
- Released: September 28, 2004
- Genre: Rock, jam, Southern rock
- Label: Widespread, Sanctuary
- Producer: Widespread Panic, John Keane

Widespread Panic chronology
Über Cobra (2004)	Jackassolantern (2004)	Live at Myrtle Beach (2005)

Professional ratings
Review scores
Source	Rating
AllMusic	3/5 stars

Jackassolantern is the sixth live album released by the Athens, GA-based band Widespread Panic. The album was recorded during various Halloween shows on which the band has performed. It was released on September 28, 2004, and was the third of the three live releases in 2004 by the band. The album is composed of cover songs that the band has performed. The album was released both on CD and as a limited-edition vinyl record.

The album peaked at No. 169 on the Billboard 200.

== Track listing ==
1. "Sweet Leaf" (Black Sabbath) – 6:51
2. "Sympathy for the Devil" (Jagger, Richards) – 5:59
3. "Sex Machine" (Brown) – 8:35
4. "Hot in Herre" (Nelly) – 8:02
5. "Peace Frog/Blue Sunday" (The Doors) – 5:30
6. "Slippin' into Darkness" (War) – 10:09
7. "The Wind Cries Mary" (Hendrix) – 3:40
8. "Ball of Confusion (That's What the World Is Today)" (The Temptations) – 16:48
9. "Godzilla" (Blue Öyster Cult) – 5:02

== Personnel ==
Widespread Panic

- John Bell – guitar, vocals
- John Hermann – keyboards, vocals
- George McConnell – guitar, vocals
- Todd Nance – drums, vocals
- Domingo S. Ortiz – percussion
- Dave Schools – bass
- Michael Houser – guitar, vocals

Guest Performers

- Randall Bramblett – saxophone
- The Dirty Dozen Brass Band

Production

- John Keane – producer, mixing
- Billy Field – engineer
- Ken Love – mastering
- Brad Blettenberg – engineer
- Flournoy Holmes – artwork, design, photography
- Ellie MacKnight – package coordinator
- Oade Brothers – assistant
- Chris Rabold – assistant
