= Live from the Backyard =

Video by Widespread Panic
- Released: February 4, 2003
- Genre: Rock, Southern rock, Jam
- Length: 157 minutes
- Label: Landslide (1988); Capricorn/Warner Bros. (1992, 1994); Zomba/Legacy (2001)
- Producer: Michael Drumm; Dan Russo; Meg Harkins; Buck Williams

Live from the Backyard is a live DVD concert by American rock group Widespread Panic, which was recorded live in Austin, Texas on July 20, 2002. The DVD features over two hours of music as well as backstage footage and interviews with the band. The DVD was recorded less than a month after the final performance of lead guitarist Michael Houser, who would shortly die from pancreatic cancer. George McConnell, who would later officially succeed Houser, plays lead guitar throughout the performance but is credited on the DVD as a "special guest."

Exclaim! noted, "The content is primarily documentary in nature, featuring the band and their pastimes outside of the group."

== Track listing ==
=== Disc One ===
Set One

1. Weight of the World
2. Down
3. Tall Boy
4. Rock
5. Little Lily
6. Sleeping Man
7. Trouble
8. Doreatha
9. Sometimes

Set Two

1. Bayou Lena
2. Give
3. Old Neighborhood
4. Get In Get Out
5. Stop Breakin' Down Blues
6. Jam
7. Drums
8. Pickin' Up the Pieces
9. Christmas Katie
10. Action Man

Encore

1. Old Joe
2. Blue Indian
3. Imitation Leather Shoes

=== Disc Two ===
- Movie/Behind the Scenes Collage
- Exclusive Band Interview
- Panic Pastimes
- Meet the Crew
- Photo Gallery

== Personnel ==
=== Widespread Panic ===
- John Bell – Vocals, guitar
- John "JoJo" Hermann – Keyboards, vocals
- Todd Nance – Drums, vocals
- Domingo S. Ortiz – Percussion, vocals
- David Schools – Bass, vocals

=== Guest musicians ===
- Randall Bramblett** – Saxophone, vocals (Courtesy of New West Records)
- George McConnell – Guitar, vocals

Sitting in

- Cody Dickinson – Percussion
- Luther Dickinson – Guitar

Note: Cody and Luther Dickinson of North Mississippi Allstars appear courtesy of Tone-Cool Records

=== Production ===
- Michael Drumm – Director and Producer
- Jon Obenchain & Amy Weller – Editors
- Dan Russo & Meg Harkins – Producers for Sanctuary Records
- Buck Williams – Producer for Widespread Panic
- John Keane (at John Keane Studios) – Audio Mixer
  - Assisted by Chris Byron
- Mark Waldrep, AIX Media Group – Audio Editing and Mastering, Authored
- Sam Lanier & Brown Cat, Inc., Buck Williams – Management
- Billy Perkins – Cover Design
- Smay Vision – Package Design
- Jackie Jasper – Photo
