= Free Somehow =

Studio album by Widespread Panic
- Released: February 12, 2008
- Recorded: May 2007
- Genres: Rock, Southern rock, jam
- Label: Widespread
- Producers: Terry Manning, Widespread Panic

Widespread Panic chronology
| Earth to America (2006) | Free Somehow (2008) | Dirty Side Down (2010) |

Professional ratings
Review scores
| Source | Rating |
|---|---|
| AllMusic | 3/5 stars |
| PopMatters | link |

Free Somehow is the tenth studio album by the Athens, Georgia-based band Widespread Panic. It was recorded in May 2007 with Terry Manning producing in Nassau, Bahamas at the Compass Point Studios. It was the band's first studio album featuring guitarist Jimmy Herring, who joined in 2006.

== Track listing ==
1. "Boom Boom Boom" (Jerry Joseph / Widespread Panic) 4:25
2. "Walk on the Flood" (Widespread Panic) 6:53
3. "Angels on High" (Terry Manning / Widespread Panic) 7:13
4. "Three Candles" (Widespread Panic) 5:00
5. "Tickle the Truth" (Widespread Panic) 5:15
6. "Free Somehow" (Widespread Panic) 4:43
7. "Flicker" (Jerry Joseph / Widespread Panic) 4:57
8. "Dark Day Program" (Jerry Joseph / Widespread Panic) 5:57
9. "Her Dance Needs No Body" (Terry Manning / Widespread Panic) 8:19
10. "Already Fried" (Widespread Panic) 3:36
11. "Up All Night" (Widespread Panic) 3:46

== Personnel ==
Widespread Panic

- John Bell – guitar, vocals
- John Hermann – keyboards
- Jimmy Herring – guitars
- Todd Nance – drums
- Domingo S. Ortiz – percussion
- Dave Schools – bass

Guest performers

- Horns on "Angels on High", "Dark Day Program", "Her Dance Needs No Body" – The Compass Point Horns:
  - Trumpet & Flugelhorn – Jawara Adams
  - Saxophone – Tino Richardson
  - Valve Trombone – Terry Manning
- Horns on "Up All Night":
  - Trumpet – Rookie Fisher
  - Baritone Sax – Joel Johanson
  - Tenor Sax – Charlie Chalmers
  - Valve Trombone – Terry Manning
- Orchestral strings and woodwinds – The Compass Point Orchestra
- Horn and string arrangements, additional harmony vocals, cello and harmonica – Terry Manning
- Fiddle on "Free Somehow" – Bruce Hoffman
- Backing vocals on "Up All Night" and "Free Somehow" – Sandra Rhodes, Brenda Barnett, Charlie Chalmers
- Backing vocals on "Boom Boom Boom" – Everybody

Personnel

- Terry Manning – Producer, Engineer, Mastering
- Chris Bilheimer – Art Direction & Design

== Equipment ==
- Sabian cymbals
- Vic Firth sticks and mallets
- Goff Professional Hammond organ
- Evans & Remo drumheads
- D'Addario strings
- Jimmy plays PRS guitars
- Dave plays Modulus Graphite basses equipped GHS strings through Ampeg cabinets and amplifiers
- Domingo uses Latin Percussion instruments
- Todd uses DW drums, pedals & hardware
- John bends Washburn guitars

== Charts ==
| Chart (2008) | Peak position |
|---|---|
| US Billboard 200 | 78 |
| US Independent Albums (Billboard) | 8 |
| US Top Rock Albums (Billboard) | 21 |
| US Indie Store Album Sales (Billboard) | 11 |
