= Ball (Widespread Panic album) =

Studio album by Widespread Panic
- Released: April 15, 2003
- Genre: Rock, Southern rock
- Length: 73:27
- Label: Widespread, Sanctuary
- Producer: John Keane, Widespread Panic

Widespread Panic chronology
Live in the Classic City (2002)	Ball (2003)	Night of Joy (2004)

Professional ratings
Review scores
Source	Rating
AllMusic	4.5/5 stars
Rolling Stone	link

Ball is the eighth studio album released by the Athens, GA-based band Widespread Panic. It was released on April 15, 2003, and it was the band's first studio album with George McConnell on lead guitar. McConnell joined the band in 2002 after the death of founding member Michael Houser.

This process of recording the album departed from the band's usual methodology. Widespread Panic's previous studio albums had included mostly songs already familiar to the band's fans. Ball, however, included 12 never-before-heard songs written specifically for the album, along with one song, "Time Waits", previously performed only by singer/guitarist John Bell in solo appearances. It was also the first Widespread Panic album which did not feature at least one cover song.

The album peaked at No. 61 on the Billboard 200.

== Track listing ==
All songs by Widespread Panic unless otherwise noted.

No.	Title	Writer(s)	Length
1.	"Fishing"		4:58
2.	"Thin Air (Smells Like Mississippi)"		5:14
3.	"Tortured Artist"		5:16
4.	"Papa Johnny Road"		4:57
5.	"Sparks Fly"		2:26
6.	"Counting Train Cars"		2:53
7.	"Don't Wanna Lose You"		4:56
8.	"Longer Look"		4:02
9.	"Meeting of the Waters"		6:01
10.	"Nebulous"		8:13
11.	"Monstrosity"		4:20
12.	"Time Waits"		3:56
13.	"Travelin' Man"	Michael Houser	16:10
Total length:			73:27

== Personnel ==
Widespread Panic

- John Bell – guitar, vocals
- John Hermann – keyboards, vocals
- Todd Nance – drums, Vocals
- Domingo S. Ortiz – percussion
- Dave Schools – bass, vocals
- George McConnell – guitar, vocals

Production

- John Keane – production, mixing, recording
- Billy Field – assistant
- Danny Michael Hilley – engineer
- Ted Jansen – mastering
