= Dirty Side Down =

Studio album by Widespread Panic
- Released: May 25, 2010
- Label: ATO/Widespread Records
- Producers: John Keane; Widespread Panic

Widespread Panic chronology
Free Somehow (2008)	Dirty Side Down (2010)	Live in the Classic City II (2010)

Professional ratings
Review scores
Source	Rating
AllMusic	4/5 stars

Dirty Side Down is the eleventh studio album by American band Widespread Panic. The album signaled the return of John Keane as producer and was recorded in the band's hometown of Athens, Georgia, in contrast to the previous two albums produced by Terry Manning at Compass Point Studios in the Bahamas. It is the fourth album released after the death of Michael Houser and the first for ATO Records.

Songs on the album range from road-tested classics like Jerry Joseph's classic North, Clinic Cynic, one of the few songs where Todd Nance sings lead vocals, and Visiting Day to new originals like Saint Ex, Shut Up and Drive and Cotton Was King. Also included is This Cruel Thing the latest of several Vic Chesnutt covers released by the band, and True to My Nature a collaboration with Daniel Hutchens of Bloodkin.

Widespread Panic’s John Bell on “Saint Ex”:

My wife Laura and I are great fans of The Little Prince by Antoine de Saint-Exupéry. It's thought of as a children’s book but conveys some pretty heavy messages on many levels. A couple of years ago, my father sent me a New York Times article about an eighty-five-year-old German World War II pilot who realized he was the guy that shot down Saint Ex (a French pilot) in 1944. The plane Saint-Exupéry was flying had been identified in 2004, ending the sixty-year-old mystery surrounding the author’s disappearance. Both pilots were on simple reconnaissance missions, and it was kind of a fluke that they happened upon each other. What I found intriguing about the situation is that the German pilot said Saint-Exupéry was one of his favorite authors, and claimed if he was aware of who was flying the French aircraft, he wouldn't have opened fire. I began reading more of Saint-Exupéry's works, and even though they're translations, his insights about “Life During Wartime” are really profound and heartfelt – simultaneously caring about all humanity, while feeling compelled to fight for his country.

This is the last Widespread Panic album to feature their original drummer Todd Nance.

== Commercial performance ==
Dirty Side Down debuted at No. 27 on the Billboard 200, and No. 6 on Top Rock Albums, selling 13,000 copies on the first week of its release. The album has sold 72,000 copies in the United States as of September 2015.

== Track listing ==
1. "Saint Ex" (Widespread Panic) 6:47
2. "North" (Jerry Joseph) 5:42
3. "Dirty Side Down" (Widespread Panic) 3:57
4. "This Cruel Thing" (Vic Chesnutt) 4:30
5. "Visiting Day" (Widespread Panic) 5:27
6. "Clinic Cynic" (Widespread Panic) 4:35
7. "St. Louis" (Widespread Panic) 2:52
8. "Shut Up and Drive" (Widespread Panic) 6:44
9. "True to My Nature" (Daniel Hutchens / Widespread Panic) 4:54
10. "When You Coming Home" (Widespread Panic) 5:37
11. "Jaded Tourist" (Bill Elder / Widespread Panic) 4:28
12. "Cotton Was King" (Widespread Panic) 5:52

== Personnel ==
Widespread Panic

- John Bell – vocals, guitar
- John Hermann – keyboards, vocals
- Jimmy Herring – lead guitar
- Todd Nance – drums, vocals
- Domingo S. Ortiz – percussion
- Dave Schools – bass, vocals

Guest performers

- John Keane – pedal steel and acoustic guitar

Personnel

- John Keane – Producer, Engineer, Mastering

== Charts ==
Chart (2010)	Peak position
US Billboard 200	27
US Independent Albums (Billboard)	2
US Top Rock Albums (Billboard)	6
US Indie Store Album Sales (Billboard)	7
