= Widespread Panic (album) =

Studio album by Widespread Panic
- Released: July 30, 1991
- Genres: Rock, southern rock, jam rock
- Length: 72:57
- Label: Capricorn/Warner Bros.
- Producer: Johnny Sandlin

Widespread Panic chronology
Space Wrangler (1988)	Widespread Panic (1991)	Everyday (1993)

Professional ratings
Review scores
Source	Rating
AllMusic	4.5/5 stars
Metal Hammer	5/5 stars

Widespread Panic is the second studio album by the Athens, Georgia-based band Widespread Panic. It was released by Capricorn Records and Warner Bros. Records on July 30, 1991. It was re-released in 2001 by Zomba Music Group. The album was issued on vinyl for the first time ever on July 29, 2014.

The band had originally recorded material in September 1990 at producer/collaborator/friend John Keane's studio in Athens, Georgia. This session, called Mom's Kitchen, featured the majority of the songs that would eventually be recorded for Widespread Panic, along with other tracks like "A of D", "Impossible", "Machine", "Liza's Apartment (L.A.)", "Conrad", "Contentment Blues", and "Holden Oversoul", of which the latter two were included on the reissues of Space Wrangler (1988). Mom's Kitchen, however, was never released because the band signed a six-album deal with Capricorn Records in January 1991.

Recording of the album proper took place at Emerald Sound Studios (Nashville, Tennessee), Kiva Studios (Memphis, Tennessee), and Duck Tape Music Studio (Decatur, Alabama). The album features T Lavitz on keyboards and was produced by Johnny Sandlin.

For many years after the album’s release, rumors swirled that Track 7, C. Brown, was included on the album as a tribute to Camden, Alabama native Cliff Brown Jr., former singer for Tuscaloosa’s The Ecchoing Green. These rumors were thought to have been put to rest when Brown, along with Green bass player Keith Ferguson, described their adventure during a 2004 interview with The Tuscaloosa News. However, the rumors have not completely died and are still currently debated.

The band played the album in its entirety at the Charter One Pavilion in Chicago on September 2, 2009.

== Track listing ==
All tracks written by Widespread Panic, except where noted.

1. "Send Your Mind" (Van Morrison) – 3:00
2. "Walkin' (For Your Love)" – 4:32
3. "Pigeons" – 6:24
4. "Mercy" – 6:51
5. "Rock" – 5:10
6. "Makes Sense to Me" (Daniel Hutchens) – 3:13
7. "C. Brown" (Widespread Panic, Jeff Riley) – 5:55
8. "Love Tractor" – 5:09
9. "Weight of the World" – 4:50
10. "I'm Not Alone" – 6:29
11. "Barstools and Dreamers" – 9:53
12. "Proving Ground" – 6:50
13. "The Last Straw" – 4:41

== Personnel ==
Widespread Panic

- John Bell – Vocals, Guitar
- Michael Houser – Guitar, Vocals
- Todd Nance – Drums
- Domingo S. Ortiz – Percussion
- Dave Schools – Bass, Vocals

Additional musicians

- T Lavitz – Keyboards
- Samantha Woods – Background Vocals on "Mercy"
- Wayne Jackson – Trumpet, Trombone
- Andrew Love – Saxophone

Additional personnel

- Johnny Sandlin – producer, engineer, mixing
- Jeff Coppage – engineer, remixing
- Steve Tillisch – engineer
- Alan Schulman – engineer
- Jim Bickerstaff – assistant engineer, mixing
- Greg Archilla – assistant engineer
- Johnny Walls – assistant engineer
- Andrew Kautz – assistant engineer
- Russ Martin – mixing assistant
- Glenn Meadows – mastering
- Bonnie Koloc – illustrations
- William Claxton – photography
- Deborah Norcross – artwork
