= Live at Myrtle Beach =

Live album by Widespread Panic
- Released: February 22, 2005
- Genre: Rock, Southern rock, jam
- Label: Widespread, Sanctuary
- Producer: Widespread Panic, John Keane

Widespread Panic chronology
| Jackassolantern (2004) | Live at Myrtle Beach (2005) | Earth to America (2006) |

Professional ratings
Review scores
| Source | Rating |
|---|---|
| AllMusic | 2.5/5 stars |
| Rolling Stone | 3/5 stars |

Live at Myrtle Beach is the seventh live album released by the Athens, GA-based band Widespread Panic. The album presents the entire second set performed at the House of Blues in Myrtle Beach, SC on November 8, 2003, in sequence. It can be paired with their previous release, Uber Cobra, to complete the full concert that was performed on this date. It was released on February 22, 2005.

== Track listing ==
Disc one

1. "Ain't Life Grand" (Widespread Panic) – 5:31
2. "Conrad the Caterpillar" (Widespread Panic) – 9:25
3. "Don't Wanna Lose You" (Widespread Panic) – 17:10
4. "Dirty Business" (Dalton) – 12:37
5. "Stop Breakin' Down Blues" (Johnson) – 7:37

Disc two

1. "Papa's Home" (Widespread Panic) – 23:55
2. "Henry Parsons Died" (Hutchens, Carter) – 6:44
3. "Action Man" (Widespread Panic) – 4:42
4. "Postcard" (Guenther/Widespread Panic) – 4:26
5. "Bowlegged Woman" (Carter, Rush) – 13:24
6. "Chilly Water" (Widespread Panic) – 9:42

== Personnel ==
Widespread Panic

- John Bell – guitar, vocals
- John Hermann – keyboards, vocals
- George McConnell – guitar, vocals
- Todd Nance – drums, vocals
- Domingo S. Ortiz – percussion
- Dave Schools – bass

Guest Performers

- John Keane – pedal steel

Production

- John Keane – producer, mixing
- Billy Field – engineer
- Ken Love – mastering
- Brad Blettenberg – assistant engineer
- Flournoy Holmes – artwork, design, photography
- Ellie MacKnight – package coordinator
- Oade Brothers – assistant engineer
- Chris Rabold – assistant engineer
- Thomas Smith – photography
