= Panic in the Streets (album) =

Video by Widespread Panic
- Released: November 19, 2002
- Recorded: April 18, 1998
- Genre: Southern rock, jam band
- Length: 118 minutes
- Label: Landslide (1988); Capricorn/Warner Bros. (1992, 1994); Zomba/Legacy (2001)

Panic in the Streets is a filmed document of Widespread Panic's April 18, 1998 concert/release party for the band's first live album Light Fuse Get Away (which would contain 19 tracks from various performances in 1997). Filmed in the band's hometown of Athens, GA the 1998 concert marked one of the world's biggest CD release parties with an estimated 100,000 "Spreadheads" in attendance. The DVD "Panic in the Streets" includes footage from the downtown concert as well as classic footage from 1991 (filmed at another Athens venue) entitled Live from the Georgia Theatre. The DVD also includes the Billy Bob Thornton-directed video of the song "Aunt Avis" featuring Vic Chesnutt and Laura Dern.

The audio from Panic in the Streets was also released on CD.

== DVD/CD track listing ==
1. "Disco" (John Bell, John Hermann, Michael Houser, Todd Nance, Domingo Ortiz, David Schools) – 4:58
2. "Tall Boy" (Bell, Hermann, Houser, Nance, Ortiz, Schools) – 7:56
3. "Love Tractor" (Bell, Houser, Nance, Ortiz, Schools) – 5:54
4. "Aunt Avis" (Vic Chesnutt) – 7:22
5. "Chilly Water" (Bell, Houser, Nance, Schools, Ortiz) – 9:01
6. "Porch Song" (Bell, Houser, Nance, Schools, Ortiz) – 7:38
7. "Pilgrims" (Bell, Hermann, Houser, Nance, Schools, Ortiz) – 8:03
8. "Fishwater" (Bell, Hermann, Houser, Nance, Schools, Ortiz) – 9:01
9. "Space Wrangler" (Bell, Houser, Nance, Schools, Ortiz) – 10:54
10. "Ain't Life Grand" (Bell, Hermann, Houser, Nance, Ortiz, Schools) – 5:27
11. "Aunt Avis" (Video Clip) (DVD release only)

Bonus: Live from the Georgia Theatre

1. "Send Your Mind" (Van Morrison) – 2:55
2. "Pigeons" (Bell, Houser, Nance, Ortiz, Schools) – 6:46
3. "Walkin' (For Your Love)" (Bell, Houser, Nance, Ortiz, Schools) – 4:47
4. "Mercy" (Bell, Houser, Nance, Ortiz, Schools) – 1:11
5. "Makes Sense to Me" (Daniel Hutchens) – 3:39
6. "Mercy (Reprise)" (Bell, Houser, Nance, Ortiz, Schools) – 1:14
7. "Rock" (DVD release only)

== Personnel ==
=== Panic in the Streets ===
- John Bell
- John "JoJo" Hermann
- Michael Houser
- Todd Nance
- Domingo S. Ortiz
- David Schools

=== Live from the Georgia Theatre ===
- John Bell
- Michael Houser
- Todd Nance
- Domingo S. Ortiz
- David Schools
- T Lavitz
- Samantha Woods - additional vocals on "Mercy"
