= Wood (Widespread Panic album) =

Live album by Widespread Panic
- Released: October 16, 2012
- Genre: Rock, southern rock, jam
- Length: 1:50:34
- Label: Widespread Records
- Producer: Widespread Panic

Widespread Panic chronology
Live Wood (2012)	Wood (2012)	Street Dogs (2015)

Professional ratings
Review scores
Source	Rating
Allmusic	3.5/5 stars

Wood is the twenty-first album by the Athens, Georgia-based band Widespread Panic. It is their tenth official live album release. It was released on the band's Widespread Records imprint on October 16, 2012. Initially released on 2-CD, 2-LP and digitally, it features material recorded from the band's 25th anniversary Wood Tour in 2012. This is also the last album featuring Todd Nance on drums.

Another release, Live Wood was also culled from the 2012 Wood Tour and was released on Record Store Day, April 21, 2012.

== Track listing ==
=== Disc 1 ===
1. "The Ballad of John and Yoko" (John Lennon, Paul McCartney) 4:12
2. "Mercy" (Widespread Panic) 7:31
3. "Imitation Leather Shoes" (Widespread Panic) 5:43
4. "Clinic Cynic" (Widespread Panic) 4:46
5. "Tall Boy" (Widespread Panic) 7:04
6. "Many Rivers to Cross" (James E. Chambers) 4:53
7. "Good Morning Little School Girl" (Sonny Boy Williamson I) 8:42
8. "Pickin' Up the Pieces" (Widespread Panic) 6:19
9. "Ain't Life Grand" (Widespread Panic) 4:41

=== Disc 2 ===
1. "St. Louis" (Widespread Panic) 4:24
2. "Time Waits" (Widespread Panic) 3:44
3. "Sell Sell" (Alan Price) 5:23
4. "Tail Dragger" (Willie Dixon) 5:19
5. "Tickle the Truth" (Widespread Panic) 5:32
6. "Fixin' to Die" (Bukka White) 6:44
7. "Climb to Safety" (Jerry Joseph, Glen Esparanza) 6:11
8. "Counting Train Cars" (Widespread Panic) 3:32
9. "C Brown" (Widespread Panic) 5:57
10. "Blight" (Vic Chesnutt, Michael Houser, Todd Nance, David A. Schools) 4:59
11. "End of the Show" (Daniel Hutchens) 4:58 * CD Only bonus track

== Personnel ==
- John Bell - Guitar (Acoustic), Guitar (Resonator), Vocals
- Jimmy Herring - Guitar (Acoustic)
- Todd Nance - Drums, Vocals
- Domingo S. Ortiz - Percussion
- Dave Schools - Bass (Acoustic), Vocals
- John Hermann - Harmonium, Melodica, Piano, Pump Organ, Toy Piano, Vocals
- Col. Bruce Hampton - Vocals
