= Ain't Life Grand (Widespread Panic album) =

Studio album by Widespread Panic
- Released: September 6, 1994
- Genre: Jam rock, Southern rock
- Length: 57:38
- Label: Capricorn
- Producer: John Keane

Widespread Panic chronology
Everyday (1993)	Ain't Life Grand (1994)	Bombs & Butterflies (1997)

Professional ratings
Review scores
Source	Rating
AllMusic	3/5 stars
The Encyclopedia of Popular Music	3/5 stars
MusicHound Rock: The Essential Album Guide	4/5 stars

Ain't Life Grand is the fourth studio album by the Athens, GA-based band Widespread Panic. It was released by Capricorn Records and Warner Bros. Records on September 6, 1994. It was re-released in 2001 by Zomba Music Group. On July 3, 2014, the band announced that Ain't Life Grand would be reissued on vinyl in August 2014.

The band got minor airplay for their cover of Bloodkin's "Can't Get High," as well as their own "Airplane." They performed the song '"Ain't Life Grand'" at Morehouse College for Good Morning America.

The band began rehearsing for the album by recording pre-recording sessions at John Keane's home studio like their first album, Space Wrangler. They were so pleased with the results that they decided to use the sessions for Ain't Life Grand instead of going into the studio on a future date with their producer Johnny Sandlin.

The album peaked at No. 84 on the Billboard 200.

== Critical reception ==
Trouser Press wrote that "although the chorus comes straight from the Bon Jovi cliché book, 'Heroes' musters a milder version of Pearl Jam’s taut emotional ambience."

== Track listing ==
All songs by Widespread Panic except where otherwise noted.

1. "Little Kin" – 5:04
2. "Ain't Life Grand" – 4:48
3. "Airplane" – 4:11
4. "Can't Get High" (Carter, Hutchens) – 3:49
5. "Heroes" – 5:06
6. "Raise the Roof" – 4:44
7. "Junior" (Junior Kimbrough, Spring) – 4:34
8. "L.A." – 4:12
9. "Blackout Blues" – 5:17
10. "Jack" – 7:06
11. "Fishwater" – 6:10
12. Hidden Track "Waiting for the Wind to Blow Down the Tree in My Back Yard" – 1:47

== Personnel ==
Widespread Panic

- John Bell – guitar, mandolin, vocals
- John Hermann – keyboards, vocals
- Michael Houser – guitar, vocals
- Todd Nance – drums, vocals
- Domingo S. Ortiz – percussion
- Dave Schools – bass guitar

Guest performers

- David Blackmon – fiddle
- Eric Carter – vocals
- Adriene Fishe – vocals
- John Keane – guitar, pedal steel, vocals
- Dwight Manning – oboe

Production

- David Barbe – assistant engineering
- Marcia Beverley – art direction
- Caram Costanzo – mixing
- Jackie Jasper – photography
- John Keane – production, engineering, mixing
- James Mitchell (Michalopoulos) – artwork
- Clif Norrell – mixing
- Benny Quinn – mastering
