= Light Fuse, Get Away =

Live album by Widespread Panic
- Released: April 21, 1998
- Recorded: 1997
- Genre: Rock, Southern rock
- Length: 149:40
- Label: Capricorn (1998); Zomba (2001)
- Producer: John Keane

Widespread Panic chronology
Bombs & Butterflies (1997)	Light Fuse, Get Away (1998)	'Til the Medicine Takes (1999)

Professional ratings
Review scores
Source	Rating
AllMusic	4/5 stars

Light Fuse, Get Away is the first live album released by the Georgia-based band Widespread Panic. It was first released by Capricorn Records on April 21, 1998. It would later be re-released in 2001 by Zomba Music Group. The album was recorded over various concerts by the band in 1997. "Pickin' Up the Pieces" featured Branford Marsalis on saxophone and was recorded on September 7, 1997, in Boston.

On April 18, 1998, the band played a free live show in downtown Athens as part of their CD release party. The concert was filmed and released on DVD and CD as Panic in the Streets According to the band, attendance was estimated at around 100,000 people. This in turn broke a previous record by Metallica for "largest record release party".

The album reached a peak position of No. 67 on the Billboard 200 chart.

Widespread Panic in the Streets of Athens, Georgia was released in April 2018 by University of Georgia Press. Marking the 20th anniversary of the concert, the book explores the history and legacy of the gig.

== Track listing ==
=== Disc one ===
1. "Porch Song" – 7:42
2. "Disco" – 4:23
3. "Diner" – 14:04
4. "Wondering" – 4:24
5. "Love Tractor" – 5:52
6. "Pilgrims" – 8:35
7. "Space Wrangler" – 9:00
8. "Travelin' Light" (Cale) – 5:51
9. "Pickin' Up the Pieces" – 5:30
10. "Conrad" – 9:01

=== Disc two ===
1. "Papa Legba" (Byrne) – 7:10
2. "Rebirtha" – 7:51
3. "Rock" – 6:33
4. "Greta" – 10:44
5. "Barstools & Dreamers" – 10:53
6. "Impossible/Jam" – 10:51
7. "Drums" – 6:25
8. "Gimme" – 6:01
9. "Pigeons" – 8:56

== Personnel ==
Widespread Panic

- John Bell – guitar, vocals
- Michael Houser – guitar, vocals
- Todd Nance – percussion, drums, vocals
- Domingo S. Ortiz – percussion
- Dave Schools – bass, percussion, vocals
- John Hermann – keyboards

Technical

- John Keane – producer, mixing
- Brad Blettenburg – assistant engineer
- Billy Fields – assistant
- Frank Gargiulo – art direction
- Eve Kakassy – photography
- Ken Love – mastering
- Branford Marsalis – horn
- Thomas G. Smith – photography
- Jeremy Stein – photography
- Oade Brothers Audio – live audience tracks
