= Panic in the Streets =

Panic in the Streets may refer to:

- Panic in the Streets (film), a 1950 film directed by Elia Kazan
- Panic in the Streets (album), a 2002 video album by Widespread Panic
- "Panic in the Streets", a song by Praying Mantis
- "Panic in the Streets", a song by Zebrahead from Call Your Friends
