= Ain't Life Grand =

Ain't Life Grand may refer to:

- Ain't Life Grand (Slash's Snakepit album), or the title song
- Ain't Life Grand (Widespread Panic album), or the title song
- Ain't Life Grand (Black Oak Arkansas album), by Black Oak Arkansas
