= Choice Cuts =

Choice Cuts may refer to:

- Choice Cuts (Jackyl album), a 1998 compilation album by the southern metal band Jackyl
- Choice Cuts (Carcass album), a 2004 compilation album by the death metal band Carcass
- Choice Cuts: The Capricorn Years 1991–1999, a 2007 compilation album by the southern rock band Widespread Panic
- Choice Cuts, a 2012 short-story collection by Joe Clifford
