= Earth to America =

Earth to America may refer to:

- Earth to America (album), 2006 album by Widespread Panic
- Earth to America (film), a 2005 TV show to raise awareness of environmental issues
