= Duane Trucks =

American musician (born 1988)

- Born: December 28, 1988 (age 37); Jacksonville, Florida, United States
- Genres: Blues rock, Southern rock, Jam rock
- Occupation: Musician
- Instrument: Drums
- Years active: 2000s–present

Duane Trucks (born December 28, 1988) is an American musician best known as the current drummer for Widespread Panic and Hard Working Americans.

== Life and career ==
Duane Trucks was born on December 28, 1988, in Jacksonville, Florida. He began learning to play drums at the age of two and was given his first drum kit on his third birthday.

His first foray into being a professional musician was with bands led by Col. Bruce Hampton. He performed with Hampton in the Pharaoh Gummit beginning in the mid-2000s and became a founding member of one of Hampton's backup bands, The Quark Alliance, in 2007. He became a founding member of Flannel Church, a band that includes fellow Hampton collaborator A. J. Ghent, in 2010. They played a number of festivals including the 2013 Wanee Music Festival.

In 2013 Duane Trucks became a founding member of the supergroup Hard Working Americans which also features Dave Schools, Todd Snider and Neal Casal. He began filling in for founding Widespread Panic drummer Todd Nance in late 2014 when Nance stepped away from the band to deal with personal matters. He continued performing with the band as a fill-in musician until February 2016 when it was announced that he would be replacing Nance as the band's official drummer. Despite not having been an official member of the band at the time, Trucks recorded all of the drum parts on Widespread Panic's 2015 album Street Dogs.

== Personal life ==
Trucks comes from a musical family; his uncle was Allman Brothers Band drummer Butch Trucks and his older brother is Derek Trucks who is a former member of the Allman Brothers Band and currently performs with the Tedeschi Trucks Band. He is the great nephew of Major League Baseball pitcher Virgil Trucks.

He is married to Cameron Herring, the daughter of his Widespread Panic bandmate Jimmy Herring.
