= Trucks family =

American family

The Trucks family is an American family that, including marriages, includes five professional musicians and one professional baseball player.

== First generation ==
- Virgil Trucks (1917–2013), professional baseball player

== Second generation ==
- Butch Trucks (1947–2017), drummer and founding member of the Allman Brothers Band, nephew of Virgil Trucks

== Third generation ==
- Derek Trucks (born 1979), guitarist and member of the Allman Brothers Band and Tedeschi Trucks Band, nephew of Butch Trucks and brother of Duane Trucks
- Duane Trucks (born 1988), drummer and member of Widespread Panic and Hard Working Americans, nephew of Butch Trucks and brother of Derek Trucks
- Vaylor Trucks, guitarist and member of The Yeti Trio, son of Butch Trucks and cousin of Derek Trucks and Duane Trucks
- Melody Trucks, percussion and vocalist for the Melody Trucks Band, daughter of Butch Trucks, sister of Vaylor Trucks, and cousin of Derek Trucks and Duane Trucks

=== Spouse ===
- Susan Tedeschi (born 1970), vocalist/guitarist and member of the Tedeschi Trucks Band, wife of Derek Trucks
