= Earth to America (album) =

Studio album by Widespread Panic
- Released: June 13, 2006
- Recorded: January 2006
- Genre: Rock, Southern rock, jam
- Length: 61:18
- Label: Widespread, Sanctuary
- Producer: Terry Manning, Widespread Panic

Widespread Panic chronology
Live at Myrtle Beach (2005)	Earth to America (2006)	Free Somehow (2008)

Professional ratings
Review scores
Source	Rating
AllMusic	3.5/5 stars

Earth to America is the ninth studio album by the Athens, Georgia-based band Widespread Panic. It was recorded in January 2006 with Terry Manning producing in Nassau, Bahamas, at the Compass Point Studios. The album is being offered in three variations; a regular CD release, a digipak release, and a vinyl record release. The digipak release includes free song downloads through the band's concert album web page, Live Widespread Panic.com. The vinyl release includes two extra bonus tracks not found on the regular CD release.

== Track listing ==
1. "Second Skin" (Widespread Panic, Joseph) – 11:18
2. "Goodpeople" (Widespread Panic) – 6:04
3. "From the Cradle" (Widespread Panic, Tonks) – 4:22
4. "Solid Rock" (Dylan) – 5:02
5. "Time Zones" (Widespread Panic, Joseph) – 5:15
6. "When the Clowns Come Home" (Widespread Panic) – 4:26
7. "Ribs and Whiskey" (Widespread Panic) – 4:53
8. "Crazy" (Widespread Panic) – 4:19
9. "You Should Be Glad" (Widespread Panic) – 10:11
10. "May Your Glass Be Filled" (Widespread Panic) – 6:08

== Personnel ==
Widespread Panic

- John Bell - guitar, vocals
- George McConnell - guitar, vocals
- Todd Nance - percussion, drums, vocals
- Domingo S. Ortiz - percussion
- Dave Schools - bass, percussion, vocals
- John Hermann - keyboards

Guest performers

- Jawara Adams - The Compass Point Horns
- Tino Richardson - The Compass Point Horns
- The Phuket Chamber Orchestra
  - Chris Melchior - conductor and first chair violin

Personnel

- Terry Manning - Producer, Engineer, Mastering
- Billy Field - recording assistant
- Osie Bowe - assistant engineer
- Alex Dixon - assistant engineer
- Chris Bilheimer - art and package design

== Charts ==
Chart (2006)	Peak position
US Billboard 200	48
US Top Rock Albums (Billboard)	19
US Top Tastemaker Albums (Billboard)	8
