= Space Wrangler =

Studio album by Widespread Panic
- Released: February 4, 1988
- Studios: John Keane, Athens, GA
- Genres: Rock, Southern rock, jam rock
- Length: 64:36
- Labels: Landslide (1988); Capricorn/Warner Bros. (1992, 1994); Zomba/Legacy (2001)
- Producers: John Keane, Widespread Panic, Johnny Sandlin

Widespread Panic chronology
Space Wrangler (1988)	Widespread Panic (1991)

Professional ratings
Review scores
Source	Rating
AllMusic	4.5/5 stars
The Encyclopedia of Popular Music	2/5 stars

Space Wrangler is the first studio album by the Athens, Georgia-based band Widespread Panic. It was first released by a small Atlanta label, Landslide Records, on February 4, 1988. It was later reissued four times, the first two times by Capricorn Records/Warner Bros. Records, and, in 2001, by Zomba Music Group. Space Wrangler was reissued for the fourth time on vinyl for one day, July 15, 2014, as a special reissue through Think Indie distribution, that was sold only at independent record stores.

Due to time restraints on the original issue, concert staple "Conrad" was not included in the 1988 release. The reissues featured three extra tracks not found on the original release. "Holden Oversoul" and "Contentment Blues" were both from a John Keane studio session in September 1990. "Holden Oversoul" features Phish keyboardist Page McConnell on organ. "Me and The Devil Blues / Heaven" was recorded in one take and was taken from "try-out" sessions with Capricorn Records that would result in the Widespread Panic album.

Space Wrangler has been released on vinyl, cassette and CD.

The band played the original Landslide release in its entirety during the first set on December 31, 2008. This show was held at the Pepsi Center in Denver, Colorado. Nearly two years later, at their annual 'Tunes For Tots' Benefit concert on September 23, 2010, Widespread again used the first set to play through Space Wrangler in its entirety. However, for this concert, they used the track listing from the re-released Capricorn Records version of the album: adding the four additional songs (three studio tracks) included with the reissues to the setlist. For the second set of this benefit concert, which took place at the Center Stage Theatre in Atlanta, GA, the band performed the entirety of their self-titled, second studio album.

== Track listing ==
All tracks are written by John Bell, Michael Houser, Todd Nance, Domingo Sunny Ortiz and Dave Schools unless otherwise stated.

No.	Title	Writer(s)	Length
1.	"Chilly Water"		5:40
2.	"Travelin' Light"	J. J. Cale	3:36
3.	"Space Wrangler"		6:49
4.	"Coconut"		5:04
5.	"The Take Out"		2:16
6.	"Porch Song"		2:52
7.	"Stop-Go"		4:50
8.	"Driving Song"		8:29
9.	"Holden Oversoul"		3:32
10.	"Contentment Blues"		5:06
11.	"Gomero Blanco"		1:11
12.	"Me and the Devil Blues^{[b]}/Heaven^{[a]}^{[c]}"		15:11

a Produced by Johnny Sandlin
b "Me and the Devil Blues" written by Robert Johnson
c "Heaven" written by David Byrne and Jerry Harrison

== Personnel ==
Widespread Panic

- John Bell – Vocals, Guitar
- Michael Houser – Guitar, Vocals
- Todd Nance – Drums, Percussion, Vocals
- Dave Schools – Bass, Percussion, Vocals

Additional musicians

- Domingo Sunny Ortiz – Percussion
- Tim White – Keyboards
- John Keane – Vocals
- Alberto Salazarte – Rap
- David Blackmon – Fiddle
- Bill Jordan – Laughter
- Page McConnell (and Phish crew) – Organ on "Holden Oversoul"
- T Lavitz – Organ on "Me and the Devil Blues"/"Heaven"
- David Schools, John Keane and John Bell – Background Vocals on "Holden Oversoul"

Production and design

- John Keane – Producer, Engineer
- Benny Quinn – Mastering
- Heather Laurie – 1992 package design
- James Flournoy – Original Package Design/Cover Artwork
- Jeff Corbett – Original Package Logo Design
- Patricia McEachern – Original Package Photography
- Johnny Sandlin – Producer, Remixing (Track 12 only)
- Steve Tillisch – Engineer (Track 12 only)
- Jeff Coppage – Engineer, Remixing (Track 12 only)
- Jim Bickerstaff – Remixing (Track 12 only)
