= Charlie Mars =

American singer-songwriter

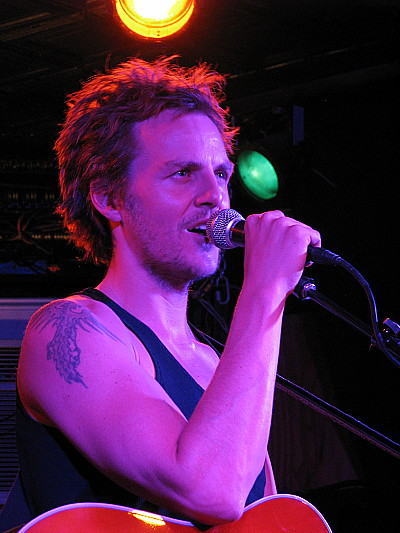
- Charlie Mars performing at The Saint in Asbury Park, New Jersey on August 25, 2012.

Background information
- Born: 1974 (age 51–52); Laurel, Mississippi
- Origin: Oxford, Mississippi
- Genres: Folk rock, Indie, acoustic
- Occupations: Singer-songwriter, musician
- Instruments: Vocals, guitar
- Years active: 1990s–present
- Labels: Rockingham Records, Thirty Tigers, V2 North America, Dualtone Music
- Website: charliemars.com

Charlie Mars is a vocalist, guitarist, and singer-songwriter from Mississippi. Mars has performed at Austin City Limits and South by Southwest. Mars was featured in Esquire Magazine's Songwriting Challenge which he says was his brainchild.

== Early life and education ==
Mars was born in Laurel, Mississippi and grew up in Oxford and Jackson, Mississippi. Mars' parents are David and Sylvia. Mars has two brothers, Sam and Chad. Mars was transformed to a musician at age 15 or 16, when he heard "Thriller" and "Slippery When Wet". The first Violent Femmes record also figured significantly into his development as a musician. He bought everything that had a similar sound. Mars' family moved to Jackson, Mississippi when he was a senior in high school. He graduated from Jackson Preparatory School in 1992. He was lead singer and guitarist in a band called Adley Madidafus in high school. Mars attended Southern Methodist University in Dallas, Texas.

== Career ==
Mars started playing for Jack Ingram in 1992 ("The Charlie Mars Band").

Mars has a floating, mellow croon combined with sensual soul-rock arrangements. Mars has been compared to Jason Mraz and Josh Rouse, and described as a tougher edged version of Jeff Buckley. Mars says that songs come to him spontaneously, and that he relies on the quality and memorability of the material to remember what he creates. Mars says "...the stuff that's any good I remember, and the crap I just forget. I'm a firm believer in the hypothesis that the good shit sticks."

== Personal life ==
In 2010 Mars said he would like to live in Austin, Texas if not for his then-girlfriend Mary-Louise Parker, actress on West Wing, Fried Green Tomatoes, and Weeds. As of 2012, he was living in Brooklyn, New York. He currently owns a home in Yalobusha County, Mississippi.

== Discography ==
- Broken Arrow (1995)
- Born & Razed (1997)
- End of Romance (1999)
- Charlie Mars (2004)
- EP (2009)
- Like a Bird Like a Plane (Dig) (2009)
- Blackberry Light (2012)
- The Money (2014)
- Beach Town (2018)
- Times Have Changed (2023)
