= John Keane (record producer) =

American record producer, audio mixer, and recording engineer (b. 1959)

- Born: January 21, 1959 (age 67); Athens, Georgia, U.S.
- Occupations: Record producer; musician
- Years active: 1981–present
- Website: www.johnkeanestudios.com/index.html

John Denison Keane (born January 21, 1959) is an American record producer and musician based in Athens, Georgia, who has worked extensively with R.E.M., Indigo Girls and Widespread Panic. He owns and operates John Keane Studios in Athens, his hometown, which opened in 1981.

== Early life ==
Keane began playing guitar at age 8 and developed an interest in recording music after receiving a cassette recorder on his 12th birthday. In a 2005 interview, he recalled: "Later I got another one and figured out how to overdub by bouncing tracks from one machine to the other while playing along. I'd do stuff like play both lead guitar parts to Allman Brothers songs, and layer vocal harmonies. When I got a four-track, I thought I'd died and gone to heaven."

== Professional career ==
Keane started in 1981 with an assortment of road-worn PA gear that belonged to Phil and the Blanks, a local band he was playing with at the time. He bought a TEAC reel-to-reel four-track tape machine which he mounted in a shopping cart and started making demos for local bands and taking them to the local college radio station for airplay.

Gradually the hobby evolved into a profession, and in 1985 Keane decided to attend The Recording Workshop in Chillicothe, Ohio. Shortly after that he bought an Amek Matchless console and an Otari 16-track tape machine and began to produce records for acts in the burgeoning Athens music scene such as the Indigo Girls, Widespread Panic, Vic Chesnutt, The Barbecue Killers and many others. His neighbor Peter Buck of R.E.M. began to bring many artists into the studio for collaboration, such as Warren Zevon, Robyn Hitchcock, Nicki Sudden, Billy Bragg, The Troggs, Richard Butler, and Nanci Griffith, to name a few. The other members or R.E.M.—Mike Mills, Michael Stipe, and Bill Berry—all brought bands into the studio, at 165 Hillcrest Avenue, to make records.

By the early 1990s, John Keane Studios had upgraded to an Otari 24-track, a Pro Tools rig and a Trident 80-B console.

His studio is still in operation today. In the early 21st century, he undertook recording projects with R.E.M., Randall Bramblett, and Widespread Panic's Dirty Side Down album, for which he received a Grammy nomination in 2011.

== Association with Pro Tools ==
Keane has participated in many music conference panels as an expert on subjects such as record production, home recording, and Pro Tools. These include South by Southwest in Austin, Texas; The Tape Op conference in Portland, Oregon; Athfest in Athens; and the Cutting Edge in New Orleans. He has taught a Pro Tools course for the University of Georgia's Music Business Program, and is the author of the popular Pro Tools book, The Musician's Guide to Pro Tools (McGraw-Hill). He has also created Online Pro Tools, a series of Pro Tools instructional videos.

== Record production discography ==
Project	Artist	Credit	Release Date
"No One Needs Help Anymore"	Polar Waves	Producer	3/3/2017
"Lil' Bear"	Ugly Cousin	Producer, Engineer, Mixing	10/30/2015
Hard Working Americans	Hard Working Americans	Mixing	1/21/2014
"Before The Feast"	Grassland String Band	Mastering	2014
The Essential Indigo Girls	Indigo Girls	Producer	2013
Wood	Widespread Panic	Mixing	10/16/2012
Subject to Change Without Notice	Jimmy Herring	Producer, Engineer, Mixing	8/21/2012
Where It Hits You	Jim White	Mastering, Mixing	2/21/2012
Apollo	Stockholm Syndrome	Producer, Engineer, Mixing	2011
That Other Mile/Light of the Night	Randall Bramblett	Remastering	2011
Live in the Classic City II	Widespread Panic	Producer, Mixing	9/28/2010
Dirty Side Down	Widespread Panic	Producer, Engineer, Mixing, Mastering	5/25/2010
Love Is a War	The Corduroy Road	Producer, Engineer	2009
Balm In Gilead	Rickie Lee Jones	Engineer	11/3/2009
Just One Drop	The Corduroy Road	Producer, Engineer	4/16/2009
Valdosta 1989	Widespread Panic	Mastering	2/24/2009
New Day	Jimmy Landry	Engineer	2/17/2009
Bar Band Americanus	Charlie Pickett	Producer, Engineer	10/7/2008
Carbondale 2000	Widespread Panic	Mixing	6/10/2008
Angel Songs	Tim Prince	Producer	2007
East of the Sun	Tuatara	Engineer	7/12/2007
Intermission	Robert Forster	Producer, Engineer, Mixing	6/18/2007
Chest Fever	Widespread Panic	Producer, Engineer	1/30/2007
ShadowBoxing	Blue Flashing Light	Engineer	2006
Volume 2	Billy Bragg	Engineer	10/17/2006
Rich Someday	Randall Bramblett	Mixing	7/11/2006
Green Winter	Love Tractor	Mixing	4/11/2006
The Workhorses of the Entertainment/Recreational Industry	The Workhorses of the Entertainment/Recreational Industry	Mastering	4/11/2006
Sandbox	Michael Houser	Producer, Engineer, Mixing, Mastering, Graphic Design	1/24/2006
Dog Days	BR5-49	Producer, Engineer, Mixing, Mastering	1/10/2006
Friendly Fire	Bill Mallonee	Mastering, Mixing	2005
Rarities	Indigo Girls	Engineer	6/14/2005
Live at Myrtle Beach	Widespread Panic	Producer, Mixing	2/22/2005
Wear N' Tear	Tishamingo	Engineer, Mixing, Mastering	2/1/2005
Mouthfeel	Magnapop	Mastering	1/25/2005
Need	James Evans	Engineer, Mixing, Mastering	2004
Jackassolantern	Widespread Panic	Producer, Mixing	9/28/2004
Dear Life	Bill Mallonee	Producer, Mastering, Mixing	9/21/2004
In the Mood	Corey Smith	Mastering	9/15/2004
Über Cobra	Widespread Panic	Producer, Mixing	7/13/2004
Holy Happy Hour	Stockholm Syndrome	Mixing	6/29/2004
Night of Joy	Widespread Panic	Producer, Mixing	3/23/2004
Ain't No Horse	Widespread Panic	Producer, Engineer, Mixing	3/9/2004
Tishamingo	Tishamingo	Producer, Engineer, Mixing	2/17/2004
Must I Paint You a Picture? The Essential Billy Bragg	Billy Bragg	Engineer	10/28/2003
Bad Day	R.E.M.	Engineer, Mixing	10/1/2003
Ball	Widespread Panic	Producer, Engineer, Mixing	4/15/2003
Defector	John Hermann	Mixing	2/11/2003
Live from the Backyard	Widespread Panic	Mixing	2/4/2003
To Understand: The Early Recordings of Matthew Sweet	Matthew Sweet	Producer	10/1/2002
Door Harp	Michael Houser	Producer, Engineer, Mixing	9/24/2002
Coast to Coast	The Cowslingers	Producer, Engineer	7/30/2002
Live in the Classic City	Widespread Panic	Producer	6/11/2002
Co-Balt	brute.	Producer, Engineer, Mixing	4/9/2002
89/93: An Anthology	Uncle Tupelo	Producer, Engineer, Mixing	3/19/2002
Visiting Normal Town	Big Wooden Radio	Engineer, Mixing, Mastering	9/25/2001
No More Mr. Lucky	Randall Bramblett	Producer, Engineer, Mixing	7/10/2001
Don't Tell the Band	Widespread Panic	Producer, Engineer, Mixing	6/19/2001
Reveal (R.E.M. album)	R.E.M.	Engineer, Musician	5/14/2001
Imitation of Life	R.E.M.	Engineer, Mixing	4/30/2001
Set the Record Straight	ID-X	Producer, Mixing, Composer	4/10/2001
Smiling Assassin	John Hermann	Mixing, Percussion	4/10/2001
Insulation	Something 5	Producer	2000
Another Joyous Occasion	Widespread Panic	Producer, Mixing	6/6/2000
Draggin' The Line	R.E.M.	Engineer	10/26/1999
End of Romance	Charlie Mars	Producer, Engineer, Mixing	10/12/1999
Kulanjan	Taj Mahal	Engineer	8/3/1999
'Til the Medicine Takes	Widespread Panic	Producer, Engineer, Mixing	7/27/1999
Straight Away	John Keane	Producer	6/15/1999
Who Died & Made You King?	Doubting Thomas	Producer, Engineer	10/26/1998
Up	R.E.M.	Engineer, Mixing	10/26/1998
Let's Kill Saturday Night	Robbie Fulks	Engineer	9/15/1998
See Through Me	Randall Bramblett	Mixing, Mastering	8/4/1998
Calling	Sara Lovell	Engineer	6/30/1998
Light Fuse, Get Away	Widespread Panic	Producer, Mixing	4/12/1998
Barrel Chested	Slobberbone	Mixing	8/12/1997
Help Wanted Love Needed Caretaker	Mount Pilot	Producer, Engineer, Mixing	8/12/1997
Love Among the Ruins	10,000 Maniacs	Producer, Engineer	6/17/1997
Fantastic Distraction	Dime Store Prophets	Producer, Engineer	5/19/1997
The Lonesome Death of Buck McCoy	The Minus 5	Engineer	5/5/1997
More than This	10,000 Maniacs	Producer, Engineer	5/5/1997
Picnic	Robert Earl Keen	Producer, Engineer	4/29/1997
Bombs & Butterflies	Widespread Panic	Producer, Engineer, Mixing	2/4/1997
Albino Alligator	Michael Brook	Engineer	1/17/1997
About to Choke	Vic Chesnutt	Producer, Mixing	1996
Hip	Hazel Virtue	Producer, Engineer	1996
New Adventures in Hi-Fi	R.E.M.	Engineer, Mixing	9/9/1996
E-Bow the Letter	R.E.M.	Engineer, Mixing	8/27/1996
Lay It Down (Cowboy Junkies album)	Cowboy Junkies	Producer, Engineer	2/27/1996
Blister Soul	Vigilantes of Love	Producer, Engineer	1995
Horsebreaker Star	Grant McLennan	Producer, Engineer	1995
Tornado Alley	Terry Lee Hale	Producer, Engineer, Mixing	1995
At the Hands of Our Intercessors	Buzz Hungry	Engineer	10/30/1995
Nine High a Pallet	Brute.	Producer	9/12/1995
Is the Actor Happy?	Vic Chesnutt	Producer, Mixing	5/23/1995
Private Stock	The Grapes	Producer	3/14/1995
Beautiful Light	The Fleshtones	Engineer	1994
Spillage	Mercyland	Engineer	1994
Normaltown	Catfish Jenkins	Engineer	11/15/1994
Flyer	Nanci Griffith	Engineer	9/13/1994
Ain't Life Grand	Widespread Panic	Producer, Engineer, Mixing	9/6/1994
Drunk	Vic Chesnutt	Producer, Engineer	1993
Bottle Rockets	The Bottle Rockets	Engineer	9/18/1993
Swim	Madder Rose	Engineer	9/6/1993
Happiness	Lisa Germano	Engineer	7/27/1993
the Lion Sleeps Tonight	R.E.M.	Producer, Engineer, Mixing	2/5/1993
Don't You Know	The Troggs	Engineer	1992
Killing Floor	Vigilantes of Love	Engineer	1992
Out There	Original Sins	Engineer	1992
The Survivors Parade	Ellen James Society	Engineer	1992
Automatic for the People	R.E.M.	Engineer	10/5/1992
March 16–20, 1992	Uncle Tupelo	Engineer	8/3/1992
Kitty	Dashboard Saviors	Engineer	7/20/1992
Rites of Passage	Indigo Girls	Engineer	5/12/1992
Lefty's Deceiver	The Jody Grind	Engineer	4/3/1992
Athens Andover	The Troggs	Engineer	3/1/1992
First We Take Manhattan	R.E.M.	Engineer	1991
8 Track Stomp	Chickasaw Mudd Puppies	Engineer	1991
A Green Little Pill	Insane Jane	Mixing	1991
Country Boy's Dream	Normaltown Flyers	Engineer	1991
Don't Try This at Home	Billy Bragg	Engineer	9/17/1991
Perspex Island	Robyn Hitchcock	Engineer	8/6/1991
Out Of Time	R.E.M.	Engineer	3/12/1991
Green Cat Island	Run Westy Run	Engineer	1990
I Belong to You	Nikki Sudden	Engineer	1990
Little	Vic Chesnutt	Engineer	1990
One Man's Trash Is Another Man's Treasure	The Jody Grind	Producer, Engineer	1990
Reluctantly We	Ellen James Society	Engineer	1990
White Dirt	Chickasaw Mudd Puppies	Producer, Engineer	1990
I Walked With A Zombie	R.E.M.	Producer, Engineer, Mixing	1991
Chain	Pylon	Engineer	10/4/1990
Nomads Indians Saints	Indigo Girls	Engineer	9/21/1990
MacDougal Blues	Kevn Kinney	Engineer, Mixing	1/21/1990
Indigo Girls	Indigo Girls	Engineer	2/28/1989
Drum	Hugo Largo	Engineer	1988
New Experience	Michelle Malone	Producer, Engineer, Mixing	1988
No Time	The Squalls	Producer, Engineer	1988
Green	R.E.M.	Mixing	11/7/1988
Space Wrangler	Widespread Panic	Producer, Engineer	2/4/1988
Strange Fire	Indigo Girls	Producer	7/28/1986
Lifes Rich Pageant	R.E.M.	Engineer	7/28/1986
Fables of the Reconstruction	R.E.M.	Mixing	6/10/1985
The Normaltown Flyers	The Normaltown Flyers	Engineer	1981

== Musician discography ==
Project	Artist	Credit	Release Date
Subject To Change without Notice	Jimmy Herring	Pedal Steel	8/21/2012
Where It Hits You	Jim White	Guitar, Pedal Steel, Vocals	2/21/2012
Apollo	Stockholm Syndrome	Guitar, Pedal Steel, Vocals	2011
Live in the Classic City II	Widespread Panic	Guitar, Pedal Steel	9/28/2010
Love Is a War	The Corduroy Road	Dobro, Guitar, Mandolin, Pedal Steel, Vocals	2009
Just One Drop	The Corduroy Road	Dobro, Guitar, Mandolin, Pedal Steel, Vocals	4/16/2009
Intermission	Robert Forster	Guitar, Bass, Keyboards	6/18/2007
Chest Fever	Widespread Panic	Guitar, Vocals	1/30/2007
Earth to Atlanta	Widespread Panic	Guitar, Pedal Steel	11/14/2006
Sandbox	Michael Houser	Bass, Guitar, Pedal Steel, Vocals, Piano	1/24/2006
Dog Days	BR5-49	Member of Attributed Artist, Sound Effects	1/10/2006
Live at Myrtle Beach	Widespread Panic	Guitar	2/22/2005
Dear Life	Bill Mallonee	Guitar, Pedal Steel, Vocals	9/21/2004
Tishamingo	Tishamingo	Banjo, Pedal Steel	2/17/2004
Über Cobra	Widespread Panic	Pedal Steel	7/13/2004
Must I Paint You a Picture? The Essential Billy Bragg	Billy Bragg	Guest Artist, Musician	10/28/2003
Coast to Coast	The Cowslingers	Pedal Steel	7/30/2002
Door Harp	Michael Houser	Guitar, Pedal Steel, Keyboards	9/24/2002
Conscious Contact	Jerry Joseph & The Jackmormons	Keyboards, Pedal Steel, Primary Artist	4/23/2002
Co-Balt	brute.	Guitar, Pedal Steel, Vocals	4/9/2002
89/93: An Anthology	Uncle Tupelo	Guitar, Bass, Pedal Steel	3/19/2002
Visiting Normal Town	Big Wooden Radio	Pedal Steel	9/25/2001
No More Mr. Lucky	Randall Bramblett	Guitar, Horn Arrangements, Loop Programming, Percussion, Programming, Shaker, Vocals	7/10/2001
Don't Tell the Band	Widespread Panic	Guitar, Guitar Effects, Noise, Pedal Steel	6/19/2001
Reveal (R.E.M. album)	R.E.M.	Musician	5/14/2001
Set the Record Straight	IDX	Composer	4/10/2001
Smiling Assassin	John Hermann	Percussion	4/10/2001
End of Romance	Charlie Mars	Guitar, Vocals	10/12/1999
'Til the Medicine Takes	Widespread Panic	Banjo, Keyboards, Pedal Steel	7/27/1999
Straight Away	John Keane	Primary Artist	6/15/1999
Who Died & Made You King?	Doubting Thomas	Bass, Guitar, Organ, Percussion, Vocals	10/26/1998
Up	R.E.M.	Musician	10/26/1998
Calling	Sara Lovell	Drum Programming, Keyboards	6/30/1998
Help Wanted Love Needed Caretaker	Mount Pilot	Vocals	8/12/1997
Love Among the Ruins	10,000 Maniacs	Guitar	6/17/1997
The Lonesome Death of Buck McCoy	The Minus 5	Vocals	5/5/1997
Picnic	Robert Earl Keen	Vocals, Mandolin, Guitar, Pedal Steel, Bass	4/29/1997
Bombs & Butterflies	Widespread Panic	Guitar, Pedal Steel	2/4/1997
About to Choke	Vic Chesnutt	Guitar	1996
Lay It Down (Cowboy Junkies album)	Cowboy Junkies	Guitar, Pedal Steel	2/27/1996
Blister Soul	Vigilantes of Love	Guitar, 12 String Guitar, Pedal Steel, Vocals, Percussion	1995
Tornado Alley	Terry Lee Hale	Guitar, Bass, Pedal Steel	1995
Horsebreaker Star	Grant McLennan	Banjo, Bass, Guitar, Keyboards, Percussion, Vocals, Xylophone	1995
At the Hands of Our Intercessors	Buzz Hungry	Sonic Assistance	10/30/1995
Nine High a Pallet	Brute.	Pedal Steel	9/12/1995
Is the Actor Happy?	Vic Chesnutt	Guitar, 12 String Guitar, Pedal Steel	5/23/1995
Private Stock	The Grapes	Guitar, Vocals	3/14/1995
Beautiful Light	The Fleshtones	Guitar	1994
Spillage	Mercyland	Pedal Steel	1994
Normaltown	Catfish Jenkins	Guitar	11/15/1994
Flyer	Nanci Griffith	Guitar, Pedal Steel, Vocals	9/13/1994
Ain't Life Grand	Widespread Panic	Guitar, Pedal Steel, Vocals	9/6/1994
Drunk	Vic Chesnutt	Slide Guitar	1993
Bottle Rockets	The Bottle Rockets	Pedal Steel, Vocals	9/18/1993
Happiness	Lisa Germano	Guitar, Pedal Steel	7/27/1993
Killing Floor	Vigilantes of Love	Pedal Steel, Slide Guitar	1992
Lefty's Deceiver	The Jody Grind	Guitar, Pedal Steel	1992
March 16–20, 1992	Uncle Tupelo	Banjo, Bass, Guitar, Pedal Steel	8/3/1992
Kitty	Dashboard Saviors	Pedal Steel	7/20/1992
8 Track Stomp	Chickasaw Mudd Puppies	Bass, Guitar, Lap Steel Guitar	1991
A Green Little Pill	Insane Jane	Pedal Steel, Piano, Tambourine, Vocal Harmony	1991
Country Boy's Dream	Normaltown Flyers	Guitar, Pedal Steel, Percussion	1991
Don't Try This at Home	Billy Bragg	Bass, Guitar, Pedal Steel	9/17/1991
Out Of Time	R.E.M.	Guitar, Pedal Steel	3/12/1991
One Man's Trash Is Another Man's Treasure	The Jody Grind	Bass	1990
I Walked With A Zombie	R.E.M.	Musician	1991
MacDougal Blues	Kevn Kinney	Banjo, Bass, Guitar, Percussion, Slide Guitar	1/21/1990
Indigo Girls	Indigo Girls	Bass, Drums, Guitar, 12 String Guitar, Shaker, Slide Guitar	2/28/1989
Space Wrangler	Widespread Panic	Vocals	2/4/1988
The Normaltown Flyers	The Normaltown Flyers	Guitar, Percussion	1981
The Boy From Nowhere, Who Fell Out of the Sky	Nikki Sudden	Pedal Steel	
