= Widespread Panic =

American rock band

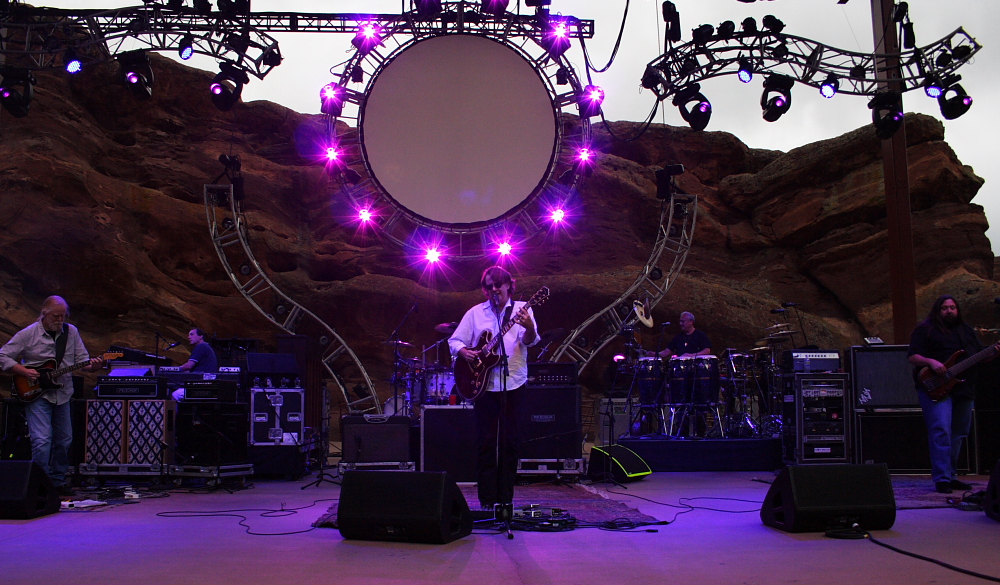
- Widespread Panic in 2010

Background information
- Origin: Athens, Georgia, U.S.
- Genres: Southern rock; blues rock; hard rock; jazz-rock; jam rock
- Years active: 1986–present
- Labels: Widespread Records, ATO, Capricorn, Sanctuary, Landslide Records, Vanguard
- Spinoffs: Brute., Slang, Hard Working Americans
- Members: John Bell; Dave Schools; Domingo S. Ortiz; John "JoJo" Hermann; Jimmy Herring; Duane Trucks
- Past members: Todd Nance; Michael Houser; T Lavitz; George McConnell
- Website: widespreadpanic.com

Widespread Panic is an American rock band from Athens, Georgia. The current lineup includes guitarist/singer John Bell, bassist Dave Schools, drummer Duane Trucks, percussionist Domingo "Sunny" Ortiz, keyboardist John "JoJo" Hermann, and guitarist Jimmy Herring. The band's original guitarist and sometime songwriter, Michael Houser, died of pancreatic cancer in 2002, and the original drummer, Todd Nance, left in 2016 and died in 2020.

The band was formed in Athens in 1986, and is influenced by southern rock, blues rock, progressive rock, funk and hard rock genres. They have been compared to other jam bands including the Grateful Dead and Phish. Widely renowned for their live performances, they have held the record for number of sold-out performances at Red Rocks Amphitheatre and State Farm Arena in Atlanta.

== Band history ==
=== 1981–1995: early years and rise to national attention ===
John Bell and Michael Houser met in 1981 in their dorm at the University of Georgia in Athens. Bell had been playing guitar as a solo act and invited his new friend Houser, also a guitarist, to join him. They later performed as a duet under the name “Severe Driving Problems.” They roomed together and collaborated on music in 1981, writing still-popular songs such as "Driving Song" and "Chilly Water" together. Bassist Dave Schools met Bell and Houser in 1984 and first played with them on February 24, 1985, at an A-Frame house on Weymanda Court in Athens. On February 6, 1986, Houser called Todd Nance, a drummer and his childhood friend, to sit in with Houser, Bell, and Schools for a charity event in Athens. It was their first show as "Widespread Panic." The band was named for Houser's once frequent panic attacks. Texan percussionist Domingo S. Ortiz ("Sunny") began sitting in with the band regularly later that year.

The band played in fraternities and bars regularly before Widespread Panic signed a contract with Landslide Records in 1987. In February 1987 the band played the now-legendary series of one dollar Monday night shows at the Uptown Lounge in Athens and the crucial local press began to take notice. Shan Clark, a Flagpole and Athens Observer art columnist emphasized Widespread Panic's musical virtuosity, songwriting, and professionalism. In September 1987, they recorded their first album, Space Wrangler, at John Keane's studio in Athens. Col. Bruce Hampton is rumored to have delivered the first pressing to the band. Songs on the album include "Chilly Water", "Travelin' Light", "Space Wrangler", "Coconut Image, originally, which ended up as ‘Coconuts", "The Take Out", "Porch Song", "Stop-Go", and "Driving Song." After Space Wrangler, touring expanded to include additional northeastern dates, along with Texas, Colorado, the west coast, and Vancouver, Canada. About this time (late 1988 or early 1989) Domingo Ortiz joined the band full-time. They played their first show in Colorado in March 1990, opening for Jerry Joseph's band Little Women. Jerry would later introduce them, at an after show at The New Sheridan Opera House in Telluride, Co., and on the heels of a big splash performance at the [Bill Graham] Mid Summer Music Fest that same day, as “The Best Band In America.”

Widespread Panic signed with Capricorn Records in January 1991. Later that year, they released their major label debut, Widespread Panic (a.k.a. Mom's Kitchen). In the same year, Billy Bob Thornton directed the movie Widespread Panic: Live from the Georgia Theatre which was recorded over two nights in Athens. As the band began touring more often, John Hermann ("JoJo") joined the band as a keyboardist in March 1992 replacing Dixie Dregs keyboardist T. Lavitz who had been with the band a year. The band continued to tour throughout the entire US in 1992 joining the famous H.O.R.D.E. tour with Blues Traveler, Phish, and the Aquarium Rescue Unit, among others. They released Everyday in March 1993 and Ain't Life Grand in September 1994. Widespread Panic marked their rise playing on network television for the first time in November 1994.

=== 1996–2002: peak touring years and Houser's death ===
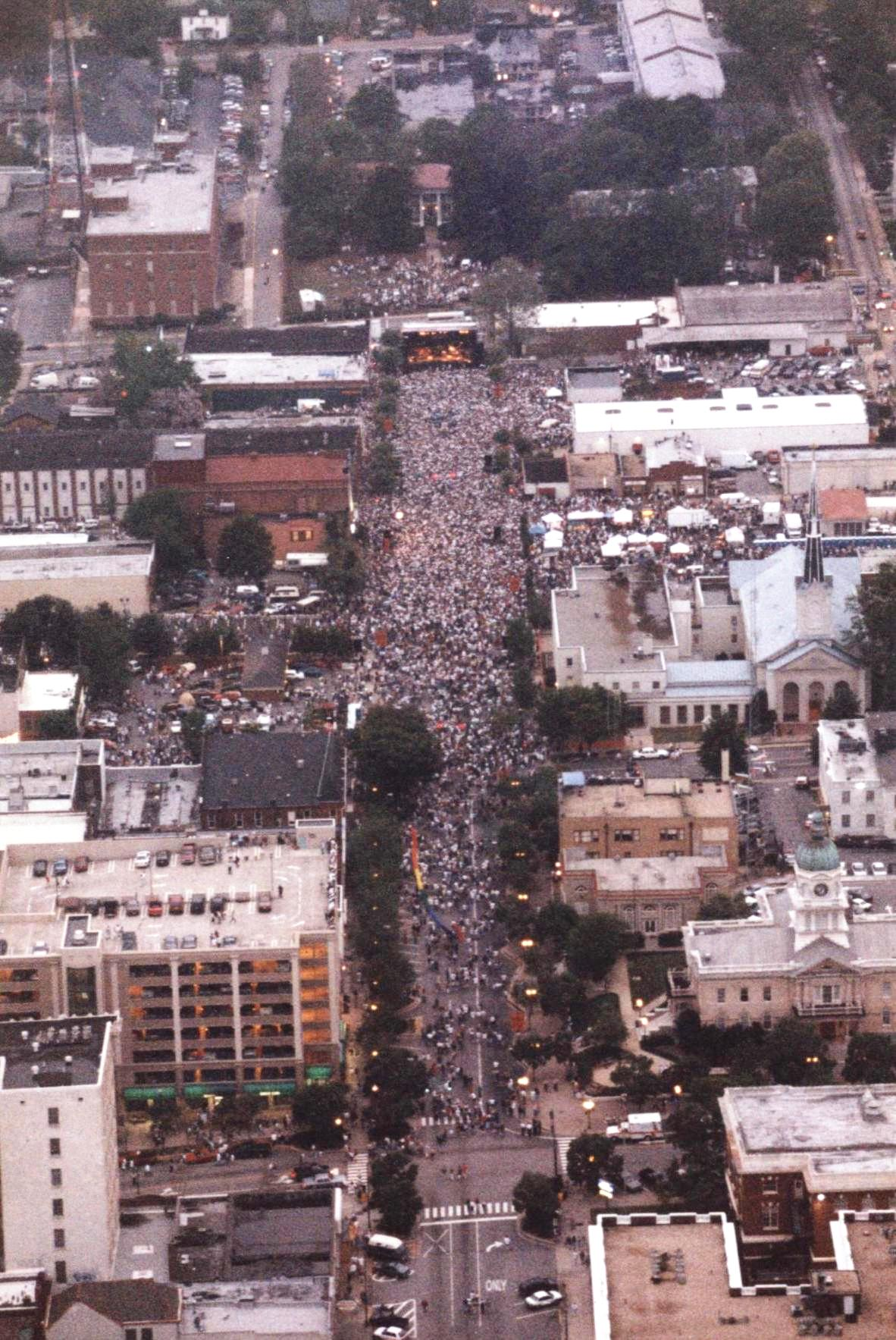
Aerial view of crowd at Light Fuse, Get Away CD release party, April 18, 1998

On April 18, 1998, to celebrate the release of their first live album, Light Fuse, Get Away, Widespread Panic offered a free "CD release party" concert in Athens. An estimated 80,000–100,000 fans descended on the city, transforming it into one of the largest CD release parties in history. In 2002, the band received gold certification for their concert DVD Live at Oak Mountain. They headlined two nights of the first annual Bonnaroo Music Festival which drew a crowd upwards of 70,000 people.

In early 2002, guitarist Michael Houser was diagnosed with pancreatic cancer. Houser continued to perform with the band into the middle of that year, but after a performance on July 2, 2002, in Cedar Rapids, Iowa he left the tour because of declining health. Guitarist George McConnell, a former bandmate of JoJo Hermann's in Beanland, took over as lead guitarist for the remainder of the band's scheduled dates. Houser died on August 10, 2002.

=== 2003–2006: George McConnell joins ===
In 2003, the band released Ball, the first studio album with McConnell as the guitarist. The album was unique among the band's offerings in that none of the songs included had been performed live by the band prior to the recording. All of the material included was written specifically for the album with the exception of "Time Waits", a song which John Bell had performed in solo appearances, and "Don't Wanna Lose You", a song John Hermann had performed with his side-project Smiling Assassins. Late in 2003, the band announced that they would be taking a hiatus from both recording and performing in 2004. However, they released three live albums in 2004, engineered by Billy Field: Night of Joy and Über Cobra—both of which were recorded during a November 2003 three-night run of shows at the House of Blues in Myrtle Beach, South Carolina—as well as Jackassolantern, a compilation of cover songs performed during the band's Halloween shows over the years. A third release from the Myrtle Beach shows, Live at Myrtle Beach was released in early 2005.

In January 2006, the band recorded their 9th studio album, Earth to America, in Nassau, The Bahamas at Compass Point Studios, with Terry Manning producing. It was released June 13, 2006. Their May 9 show at Atlanta's Fox Theatre was simulcast in Live HD, via satellite, in select movie theatres nationwide. Over 60,000 fans across the country watched it live in the theatres. The show was also released in DVD format on November 14, 2006, entitled Earth to Atlanta. On August 2, 2006, near the end of the summer tour, the band announced that George McConnell had left the band, making July 30, 2006 at the Fox Theatre in St. Louis, his last show. Producer John Keane and former guitar technician Sam Holt filled in on guitar for the remaining two weeks of the tour.

=== 2006–2014: Jimmy Herring joins ===
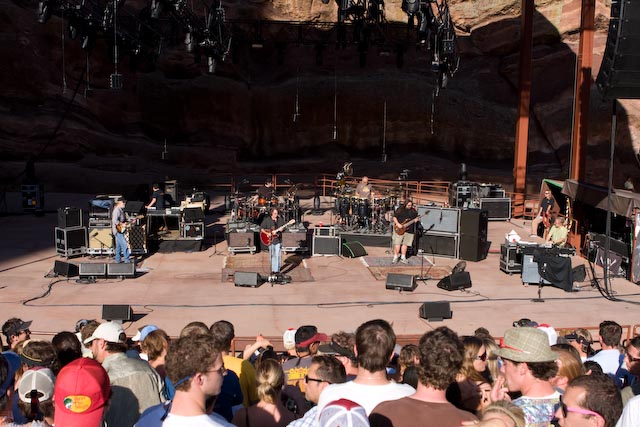
Widespread Panic performs their 32nd consecutive sold-out show at Red Rocks Amphitheatre, June 2008

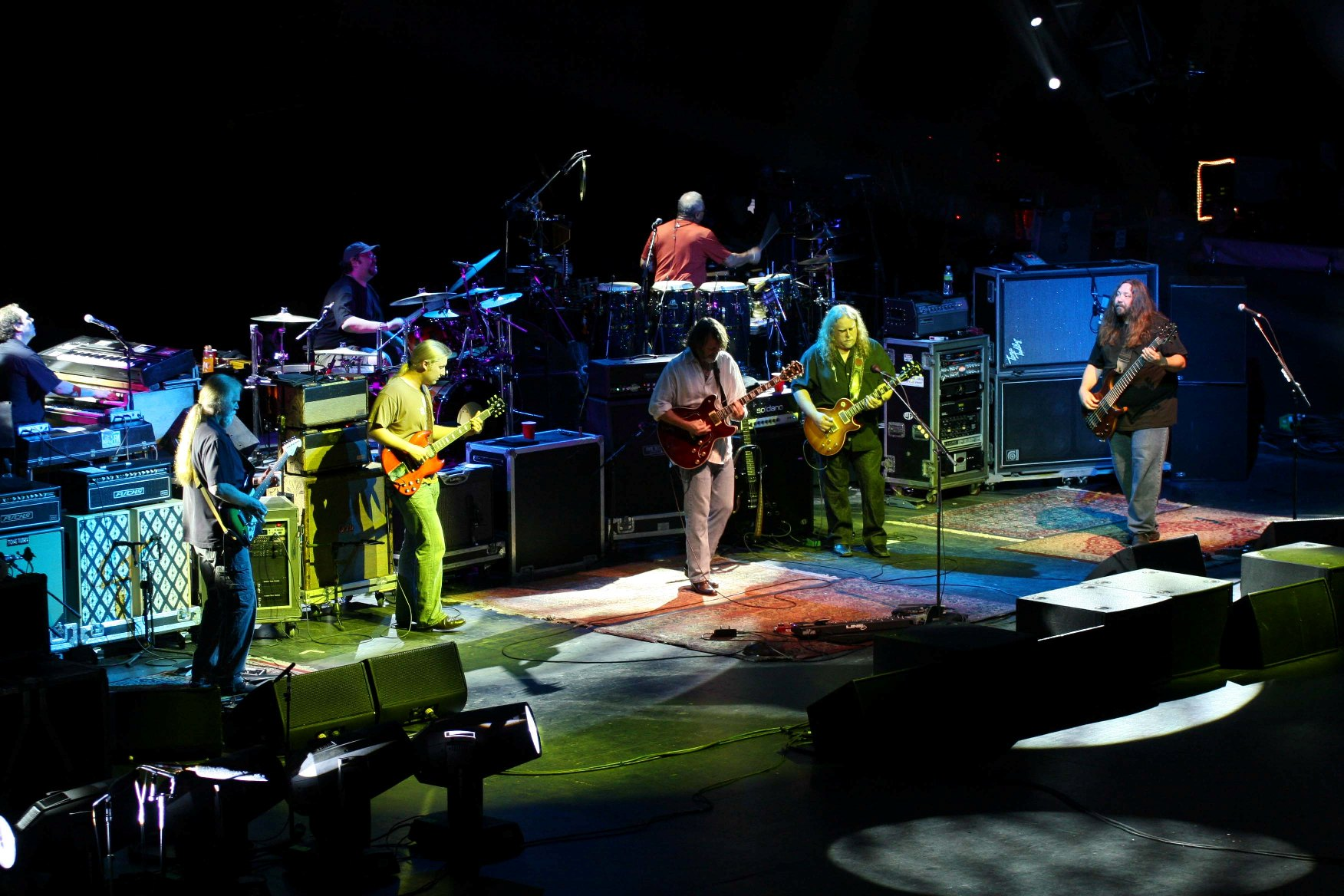
Members of the Allman Brothers join Widespread Panic on stage in Canandaigua, New York southeast of Rochester, August 2009

In late 2006, Jimmy Herring from Fayetteville, North Carolina, joined the band as lead guitarist. His began a fall tour with three nights at Radio City Music Hall in New York City. Widespread Panic's 7th annual New Year's shows on December 30 and 31, 2007, marked their 15th and 16th sellout performance at Philips Arena. The band released their 10th album, Free Somehow, on February 12, 2008. It, too, was recorded with producer Terry Manning at Compass Point Studios.

After the release of the new studio album, Widespread Panic began to release vintage concert performances from the Widespread Panic Archives. Carbondale 2000 was released on June 10, 2008, followed by Valdosta 1989 released on February 24, 2009, and Huntsville 1996 which came out on June 23, 2009. The band plans to continue to dig into their show archives and release songs from the shows as multi-track recordings. June 27, 2008, marked the band's 32nd sold-out show at Red Rocks Amphitheatre. The audience was larger than that for any other band in the venue's history. Mayor John Hickenlooper proclaimed Friday, June 27 "Widespread Panic Day" in the city and county of Denver. In the same year, the band was inducted into the Georgia Music Hall of Fame on September 20.

They toured for the rest of 2008 and the spring of 2009. In the summer of 2009, Widespread Panic teamed with fellow southern rockers, The Allman Brothers on a summer and fall co-headlining tour. In March 2010, it was announced that Widespread Panic would be releasing a new album entitled Dirty Side Down on May 25, 2010. Live in the Classic City II, containing music from its 2000 shows, came out in 2010. On September 29, 2010, Widespread Panic keyboardist Jojo Herman announced that the band would be going on hiatus in 2012. In an interview with The Vanderbilt Hustler, Herman said, "Next year will be our 25th anniversary. After that, we're probably going to call it (quits) for a while... we're looking forward to next year and going out on a high note."

The band toured steadily throughout 2011, ending the year with their first show at Time Warner Cable Arena in Charlotte, North Carolina. In early 2012, the band played a limited number of shows. From January to February they went on their first completely acoustic tour. Dubbed the Wood Tour, it began in January at the Fillmore in downtown Silver Spring, Maryland and ended at The Belly Up in Aspen, Colorado. Two recordings from the tour were released in 2012, a special Record Store Day-only vinyl record called Live Wood in April and later Wood, on October 16.

For the rest of 2012 the band was on hiatus but band members were active with other projects. Dave Schools toured with the Mickey Hart Band, Jimmy Herring recorded a new album and toured with his own band, and Jojo Hermann played shows with the Missing Cats, occasionally opening and sitting in with the North Mississippi Allstars. On August 17, the band announced their first scheduled shows after the hiatus, including two nights in Charlotte and a four night run in the Dominican Republic. Between the two short legs of the 2012 Wood Tour, the band played a four night run in Mexico, their first shows in the country, and beginning what became an annual tradition called Panic en la Playa. The first Panic En La Playa was held on the beach at the Now Sapphire Resort in Puerto Morelos, Mexico in 2012. For 2013 and 2014, The concert was held at the Hard Rock Hotel in Punta Cana, Dominican Republic with the 2014 shows pushed back until March 17–20.

The band returned to touring in the spring of 2013 with a run of Mid-West and Southern shows beginning in April. During the shows, the band introduced new innovations in the audio broadcast of their live performances. Previously, Widespread Panic had allowed fans to use audience recording devices to simulcast live shows to fans via the internet. The first live taper stream was at the Dodge Theatre in Phoenix in November 2009 and continued through the spring 2013 tour when the band took over streaming duties and started broadcasting live soundboard recordings of the show via Mixlr.com and the Mixlr smartphone app. On December 31, 2013, the band returned to Philips Arena in Atlanta.

The Wood Tour came back in 2014 with the band playing six all acoustic theater shows, as well as a special Wood performance held 333 feet underground in the Volcano Room at Cumberland Caverns in McMinnville, Tennessee for a taping of an episode of Bluegrass Underground on PBS The band played an extensive 2014 tour, with three-night stands at Red Rocks, The Joint at the Hard Rock Hotel and Casino in Las Vegas; The Riverside Theater in Milwaukee, Wisconsin; and 1stBank Center in Broomfield, Colorado, where they played their well-known Halloween shows. The band closed out 2014 with the annual Tunes for Tots benefit performance at The Fillmore in Charlotte on December 30th, followed by an annual New Year's Eve show, held at the TWC Arena in the city.

=== 2014–present: Todd Nance departure, reduced touring and Nance's death ===
On October 2, 2014, the band announced that Duane Trucks would join the band for the 2014 fall tour. Trucks temporarily filled in for Todd Nance, who was taking personal time off. Nance reunited with the band for four shows in Mexico in early February 2016. However, on February 9, 2016, the band announced that Nance was leaving the band and that "Duane [Trucks] will be the drummer for Widespread Panic moving forward." Prior to joining Widespread Panic, Trucks was the drummer for Hard Working Americans, whose lineup also included Widespread Panic bassist Dave Schools.

On September 25, 2015, Street Dogs, their 13th studio album, was released through Vanguard Records. Street Dogs was recorded by John Keane at Echo Mountain Recording Studio in Asheville, North Carolina. The album is composed of seven originals and three covers: Alan Price's "Sell Sell", Murray McLauchlan's "Honky Red" and "Tail Dragger", a Willie Dixon tune popularized by Howlin' Wolf. In April 2016, keyboardist John Hermann announced that Widespread Panic would stop touring extensively at the end of the year. However, he said that the band is not breaking up and will continue to make festival appearances and perform shows at select venues such as Red Rocks.

Nance died on August 19, 2020, in Athens, Georgia. He was 57; his death was first announced on Facebook by collaborator Cody Dickinson and was later confirmed by Relix, a magazine. Details on the chronic illness which led to his death were not disclosed.

== Live shows ==
=== Setlists for concerts ===
Known for never playing the same show twice, the band utilizes a show-to-show method of choosing the night's setlist. At the beginning of each tour, a member of the band's road crew makes a master list of all the songs the band performs and laminates it. Each night before the show he marks the last three nights' set lists in different colors. The band is able to see what has been played recently and they decide what songs to play during the first set. They return to the list during a set break to pick songs for the second set, and likewise, return after the second set for any additional sets if they are playing more than two sets or the encore. The late Garrie Vereen talks about the unusual practice in the DVD The Earth Will Swallow You.

=== Tapers ===
Widespread Panic has a policy of allowing their fans to tape, trade, and to a limited extent freely distribute their shows. However, anonymous distribution such as P2P and commercial distribution is not permitted. Fans have been taping and trading shows since before they gained national prominence, allowing them to gain their strong national following.

== Members ==
=== Current members ===
- John Bell – lead vocals, rhythm guitar (1986–present)
- Dave Schools – bass, vocals (1986–present)
- Domingo S. Ortiz – percussion (1986–present)
- John Hermann – keyboards, vocals (1992–present)
- Jimmy Herring – lead guitar (2006–present; on hiatus)
- Duane Trucks – drums (2014–present)
- Nick Johnson- lead guitar (2026–present; touring only)

=== Former members ===
- Todd Nance – drums, vocals (1986–2014; died 2020)
- Michael Houser – lead guitar, vocals (1986–2002; died 2002)
- T Lavitz – keyboards (1991–1992; died 2010)
- George McConnell – lead guitar, vocals (2002–2006)

== Side projects ==
- In 1996 the band, under the name of Brute. recorded Nine High a Pallet with guitarist Vic Chesnutt; in 2002, Brute. released a second album, titled Co-Balt.
- Todd Nance has recorded and toured as part of the band Barbara Cue, releasing three albums.
- Dave Schools has recorded and toured as part of the band Stockholm Syndrome and the Mickey Hart Band in 2012. Schools and Layng Martine III released two albums under the name Slang: The Bellwether Project in 2001 and More Talk About Tonight in 2004. Schools was also a touring member of Gov't Mule after Allen Woody died.
- John Hermann has toured with JoJo's Mardi Gras Band when Widespread Panic took a year break. He has toured with The Smiling Assassins, and performs in a duo called The Missing Cats.
- In 2013 Schools formed Hard Working Americans with Todd Snider, Neal Casal, Chad Staehly, and Duane Trucks. The supergroup's self-titled debut album was recorded at Bob Weir's TRI Studios and mixed by John Keane. It was released on January 21, 2014.

== Charity and benefit work ==
Year	Event
1995	Contributed a cover version of Van Morrison's "And It Stoned Me" to the Capricorn compilation album Hempilation, a benefit CD for NORML (National Organization for the Reform of Marijuana Laws).
1999	Contributed a live performance version of "Blue Indian" to Live in the X Lounge II, an album benefiting United Cerebral Palsy of Greater Birmingham, a Birmingham, Alabama charity.
2003	Contributed a live June 2000 performance version of "Give" to Carved in Stone, Vol.1, an album benefiting the Preserve the Rocks Fund, a donation-driven reserve dedicated to the rehabilitation and preservation of the historic Red Rocks Amphitheatre.
2004	Recorded a cover of the NRBQ song "Ain't No Horse" for the CD The Q People – A Tribute to NRBQ.
2005	Contributed covers of The Doors' medley "Peace Frog"/"Blue Sunday" to the album Too Many Years to benefit Clear Path International's work with landmine survivors.; Created the annual "Tunes For Tots" event. This concert event raises money to support public school music programs.
2006	Recorded a cover of The Band's song "Chest Fever" for the CD Endless Highway – Tribute to The Band.
2007	Recorded a cover of John Lennon's "Crippled Inside" as a bonus track for the compilation album Instant Karma: The Amnesty International Campaign to Save Darfur.; JB, Dave, and Jimmy began to donate several sets of strings to "Wear Your Music" from Relix magazine. Both Relix and Azu Studio have teamed up to produce unique jewelry handcrafted from authentic strings donated by various musicians. Profits from jewellery sales benefit selected charities.
2008	The band participated in the Make It Right Foundation New Orleans and purchased a house for the rebuilding of the 9th Ward in New Orleans. Widespread Panic fans joined in and created the "House That Widespread Panic Fans Built" – they continue to raise money to match the band's contribution and have a house funded by Panic fans.; Performed a concert on November 19 to benefit the Bill Graham Memorial Foundation at the Fillmore at Irving Plaza in New York City.; The band began holding food drives at select shows each tour benefiting local food banks. This was an effort to "pick up the torch" the fan-run organization Panic Fans For Food handed over.
