= Domingo Ortiz =

American musician (born 1952)

- Also known as: Sunny Ortiz
- Born: Domingo Steven Ortiz; July 4, 1952 (age 74)
- Genres: Blues rock, Southern rock, jam rock
- Occupation: Musician
- Instruments: Drums, percussion
- Years active: 1960s–present
- Member of: Widespread Panic

Domingo Steven "Sunny" Ortiz (born July 4, 1952) is an American musician best known as the longtime percussionist for Widespread Panic.

== Life and career ==
Domingo Ortiz was born in 1952 to Victor and Faye Ortiz. He is of Mexican heritage and grew up in Waco, Texas. With his parents' help, he bought his first drum kit as a teenager. He played his first professional gig at the age of 15 in the 1960s at a bar with his Uncle Cruz's band. His parents were initially against the idea of him performing with a rock band but came around to the idea when they learned he would be paid $35 for the performance.

Ortiz began his career on a standard drum set, but shifted to bongos, congas, timbales and other percussion instruments as a way to distinguish himself from other drummers in Texas. In 1986 he moved to Athens, Georgia where he met up with the members of the newly formed Widespread Panic. Playing percussion, he performed with them for the first time on October 6, 1986. He continued to sit in with them regularly when they played in Georgia for the next couple of years before accepting their formal offer to join the band in late 1988 or early 1989. He has performed with them at every concert they have played since then. He has also appeared on every album they have recorded including their debut, Space Wrangler, which was recorded shortly before he officially joined the band.

Unlike most of his bandmates, Ortiz has not performed with many other groups professionally since joining the band. He did, however, perform on the late Widespread Panic guitarist Michael Houser's debut solo album Door Harp and current Widespread Panic keyboardist John Hermann's debut solo album Smiling Assassin. He was not a member of brute., a band active from 1995 to 2002 that included all of the other members of Widespread Panic and Vic Chesnutt, but he did perform on their second album Co-Balt.
