= John Bell (rock musician) =

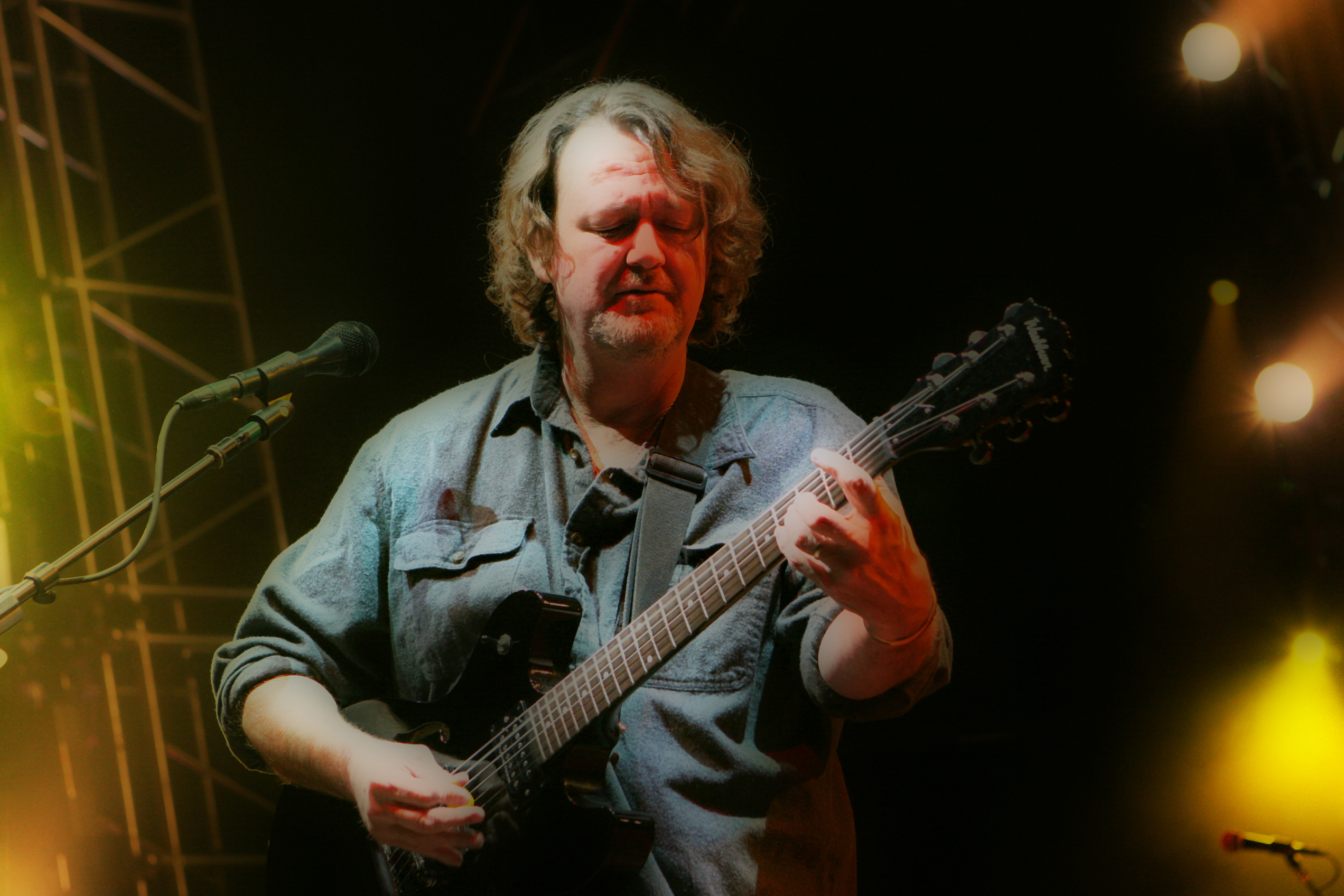
- Bell onstage performing with Widespread Panic

Background information
- Also known as: JB
- Born: 14 April 1962 (age 64); Cleveland, Ohio United States
- Genres: Rock, southern rock, blues
- Occupation: Musician
- Instruments: Vocals, electric guitar, acoustic guitar, mandolin
- Years active: 1984–present
- Website: widespreadpanic.com

John Farmer Bell (born April 14, 1962) is the lead singer, rhythm guitarist and occasional mandolin player for the American rock band Widespread Panic.

Bell grew up in Cleveland, Ohio, where he graduated from University School in 1980. He attended the University of Georgia and was a member of Sigma Phi Epsilon fraternity where he, Michael Houser, and Dave Schools met while Houser was playing at an open mic night. "Panic," as Houser was nicknamed, began playing with JB and Schools at local Athens clubs, playing mostly cover songs.

Bell is an active philanthropist, most notably as an advocate for SMA (spinal muscular atrophy). Bell has helped raise over $2 million for SMA research, mostly through his involvement with "Hannah's Buddies". The foundation is named for Bell's goddaughter and niece, who lives with SMA. Bell is involved in an annual fundraiser featuring a golf tournament and evening concert by "JB and Friends," featuring John Bell solo, as well as performing with guests. Guest performers at the benefit have included Col. Bruce Hampton, Vic Chesnutt, John Keane, and Bloodkin, as well as Grammy Award winner Robert Randolph and the Family Band and the North Mississippi Allstars, and Nickel and the Polar Bears. He has also performed at various Habitat for Humanity Christmas Jam benefit concerts put on by Warren Haynes (Allman Brothers Band, Govt Mule) annually in Haynes's hometown of Asheville, N.C.
