= Dave Schools =

American musician (born 1964)

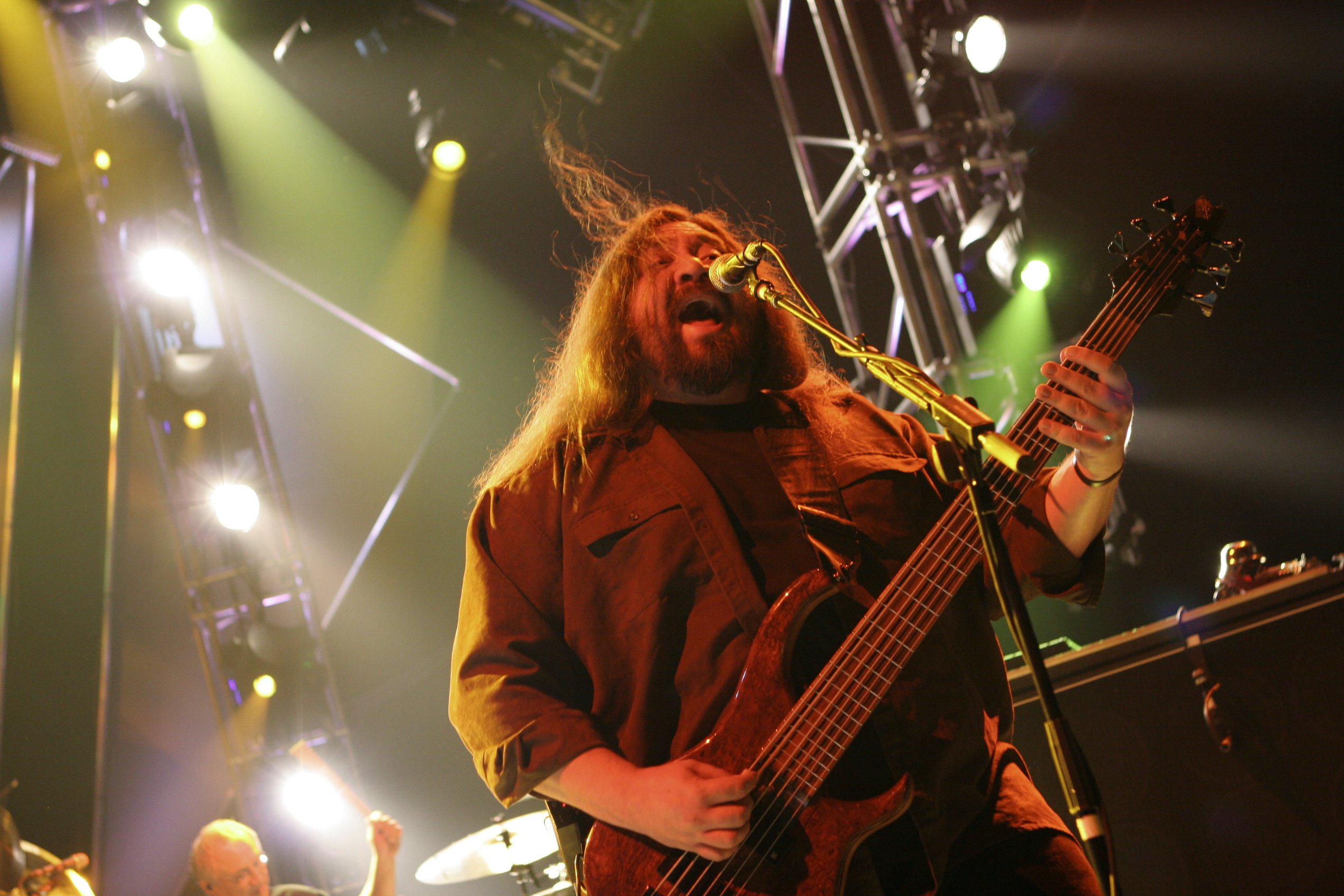
- Dave Schools performing with Widespread Panic

Background information
- Also known as: Schools, DAS
- Born: David Allen Schools; December 11, 1964 (age 61); Richmond, Virginia; United States
- Genres: Alternative rock, jam band, rock, psychedelic, Southern Rock, Experimental, heavy rock, blues, jazz
- Occupations: Musician, songwriter, record producer
- Instrument: Bass guitar
- Years active: 1970–present
- Labels: Widespread Records, Capricorn Records, Sanctuary Records, Landslide Records
- Website: http://www.widespreadpanic.com

David Allen Schools (born December 11, 1964) is a bass player and founding member of American rock band Widespread Panic. He is also a record producer, songwriter and journalist with articles published in a wide variety of music magazines. Schools lives in Sonoma County, California with his two dogs; when not on tour he likes to garden.

Schools is an innovator on the bass with a non-traditional approach that has given him a unique voice on the instrument. With his primary band, Widespread Panic, he plays a six-string Modulus Quantum 6 bass that affords him a wide range of sounds that are further enhanced by an envelope filter and octave pedal. Influenced by an early desire to play drums and childhood piano lessons, Schools has deviated from, though not abandoned, the established rhythm role of the bass and created a more melodic, improvisational style that has been referred to as “lead bass.”

== Early years ==
Dave Schools was born in Richmond, Virginia, United States. His dad bought him his first record when he was four years old, a 45 rpm of Deep Purple's cover of Neil Diamond's "Kentucky Woman," followed by Creedence Clearwater Revival and The Who. At nine years old he proudly remembers purchasing his first two LPs: Elton John's Greatest Hits and Led Zeppelin's Houses of the Holy.

Initially Schools wanted to play drums, but living in an apartment complex made this impossible and his formal music training began in second grade with limited piano lessons. He eventually switched to bass, taking lessons from age 12 to 14 before joining two high school bands, Midnight Jam and Broken Cheri.

Dave Schools attended Collegiate School, a kindergarten through twelfth grade prep school in Richmond, Virginia. While at Collegiate he held down a sports column in the high school newspaper and was editor of the yearbook. There is now a scholarship in his name for aspiring musicians and in 2004 Schools was honored to receive the Distinguished Alum Award.

Following Collegiate, Dave Schools attended the University of Georgia where he started his academic studies as a Journalism major. He quickly fell into the Athens music scene and as a freshman almost became the bass player for innovative art punk band The BBQ Killers.

It was at the University of Georgia where Schools met John Bell (vocals/guitar) and Michael Houser (guitar/vocals) with whom he formed Widespread Panic. He eventually switched his major to English "because it was easier" and allowed more time for his band to travel for shows. "Then I switched to night school" he says, "and then night school started conflicting with gigs and I dropped out of college a few hours shy of my junior year." It wasn’t long until Widespread Panic was performing 200 shows a year.

== Widespread Panic ==
Widespread Panic officially became a band in 1986 when Schools, Bell and Houser welcomed drummer Todd Nance. Percussionist Domingo "Sunny" Ortiz joined later that year and in 1992 the lineup was solidified with keyboardist John "JoJo" Hermann. In 2002, at the peak of their success, Michael Houser lost his battle to pancreatic cancer. Guitarist George McConnell filled in briefly before Jimmy Herring took over. Herring is still the lead guitarist.

Widespread Panic is famous for their live shows that stretch over three hours. Their dedication to performing live has earned them Billboard Magazine's "Road Warrior" award. They are consistently one of Pollstar's Top 50 grossing live acts. They hold the record for sold out performances at Colorado's Red Rocks Amphitheatre with 75 as of June 29, 2025, and Atlanta's Philips Arena with 20 as of May, 2017. The band is revered for their songwriting and has recorded 12 studio albums with combined sales well over 3 million. Widespread Panic was inducted into the Georgia Music Hall of Fame in 2008.

== Other projects ==
=== Stockholm Syndrome ===
Stockholm Syndrome is a rock band born from the relationship between Dave Schools and singer/songwriter/guitarist Jerry Joseph of Jerry Joseph & The Jackmormons and previously Little Women. Joseph has collaborated with Widespread Panic since the very early days of the band and has written a few of Panic's most beloved songs, including "Climb To Safety," "North," and "Chainsaw City." The seeds for Stockholm Syndrome grew out of a tour Schools and Joseph did as a duo in Europe. Wanting to take the project further, Schools and Joseph enlisted an all star cast to create a full band including guitarist Eric McFadden (P-Funk), drummer Wally Ingram (Jackson Browne, Sheryl Crow, Tracy Chapman, David Lindley), and German keyboard phenom Danny Dziuk who was later replaced by Danny Louis (Gov’t Mule). Stockholm Syndrome released its debut album, Holy Happy Hour, in 2004. The sophomore effort, Apollo, was released in 2011.

=== The Mickey Hart Band ===
In 2010 Dave Schools began recording with Grateful Dead drummer and Northern California neighbor Mickey Hart in Hart's home studio. These sessions evolved into the Mickey Hart Band and led to extensive touring through 2011 and 2012 as well as the 2012 album Mysterium Tremendum.

=== Slang ===
Slang is an experimental project featuring Dave Schools and electronic musician/engineer/bass player Layng Martine III (best known for his work with Bill Laswell). With the help of various guests, including Eric McFadden (guitar), Pete Droge (guitar), Matt Abts (drums), Ray Paczkowski (keys), Knox Chandler (guitar/special effects), Vic Chesnutt (guitar), DJ Logic (turntables), and Jay Rodriguez (sax) amongst others, Slang released its debut album, The Bellwether Project, in 2001 and followed with More Talk About Last Night in 2004.

There were a number of animated videos created for The Bellwether Project, including one for the song "Dirtwater Telegraph," which won an international animation award. American Express also used the song "What A Day May Bring" in a commercial featuring Tiger Woods.

=== Brute ===
Formed in 1995, Brute was a side project that featured singer/guitarist Vic Chesnutt and Widespread Panic members Dave Schools, John Bell, Michael Houser, John Hermann and Todd Nance. They released Nine High a Pallet on Capricorn Records in 1995 and followed with 2002's Co-Balt on Widespread Records. The band played a handful of shows between 1995 and 2002 and Widespread Panic continues to play several Vic Chesnutt songs.

=== Acetate ===
Acetate is a power-pop garage-rock band consisting of old friends Dave Schools (bass/vocals), Kevin Sweeney of Hayride and Sunshine Fix (guitar/vocals), and Ben Mize of Counting Crows and Cracker (drums/vocals). Acetate released its only album, This Band Makes Me Feel, in 2005.

=== J Mascis and the Fog ===
In 2004, Dave Schools did two tours with Dinosaur Jr. guitarist/vocalist/leader J Mascis’ side project, J Mascis + The Fog.

=== Gov’t Mule ===
Dave Schools toured with Gov’t Mule from 2000 to 2003 following founding member/bass player Allen Woody's death.

=== Weir Here ===
In 2013, Schools became a regular participant in Weir Here, a weekly webcast hosted by Grateful Dead's Bob Weir live from TRI Studios.

=== Hard Working Americans ===
Also in 2013, Schools and Todd Snider formed the supergroup Hard Working Americans at TRI Studios. Also involved are guitarist Neal Casal, Chad Staehly on keyboards, and drummer Duane Trucks, who is also the current drummer for Widespread Panic. Their self-titled debut album was released on January 21, 2014 on Three Tigers/Melvin Records

== Discography ==
=== On Bass ===
- 1988 Widespread Panic – Space Wrangler
- 1991 Widespread Panic – Widespread Panic
- 1993 Widespread Panic – Everyday
- 1994 Widespread Panic – Ain’t Life Grand
- 1995 Brute – Nine High a Pallet
- 1997 Widespread Panic – Bombs and Butterflies
- 1998 Widespread Panic – Light Fuse Get Away (Live)
- 1999 Widespread Panic – ‘Til The Medicine Takes
- 2000 Widespread Panic – Another Joyous Occasion (Live)
- 2001 Slang – The Bellwether Project
- 2001 Widespread Panic – Don’t Tell The Band
- 2002 Brute – Co-Balt
- 2002 Widespread Panic – Live In The Classic City (Live)
- 2003 Widespread Panic – Ball
- 2004 Widespread Panic – Night of Joy (Live)
- 2004 Stockholm Syndrome – Holy Happy Hour
- 2004 Widespread Panic – Uber Cobra (Live)
- 2004 Slang – More Talk About Last Night
- 2004 Widespread Panic – Jackassolantern (Live)
- 2004 J Mascis + The Fog - "J Mascis and the Fog Live at Maxwell's 11/18/2004" (Live)
- 2005 Widespread Panic – Live At Myrtle Beach (Live)
- 2005 Acetate – This Band Makes Me Feel
- 2006 Widespread Panic – Earth To America
- 2007 Widespread Panic – Choice Cuts: The Capricorn Years (1991–1999)
- 2008 Widespread Panic – Free Somehow
- 2008 Widespread Panic – Carbondale 2000 (Live)
- 2009 Widespread Panic – Valdosta 1989 (Live)
- 2009 Widespread Panic – Huntsville 1996 (Live)
- 2009 Widespread Panic – Montreal 1997 (Live)
- 2010 Widespread Panic – Dirty Side Down
- 2011 Stockholm Syndrome – Apollo
- 2012 Widespread Panic – Wood (Live)
- 2012 Mickey Hart Band – Mysterium Tremendum
- 2013 Mickey Hart Band – Superorganism
- 2014 Hard Working Americans – Hard Working Americans
- 2015 Widespread Panic – Street Dogs
- 2016 Hard Working Americans – Rest In Chaos
- 2017 Hard Working Americans – We're All In This Together
- 2019 Tim Bluhm – The Only Solution (single)
- 2019 Colonel & The Mermaids - I Do My Best To Keep From Crumbling/Springfield (7")

=== Session recordings ===
Schools has played on many recordings including, but not limited to, the following:

- 1994 Nanci Griffith – Flyer
- 1997 Robert Earl Keen – Picnic
- 2002 Gov’t Mule – The Deep End Vol. 2
- 2003 Gov’t Mule – The Deepest End DVD
- 2004 Jerry Joseph – Cherry
- 2016 The Dandy Warhols - Distortland

=== Producer credits ===
- 1993 Hayride – Smelly Old Cat
- 1996 Prozak – Daily Dose
- 1996 Heavy Feather – Heavy Feather
- 2001 Slang – The Bellwether Project
- 2003 Jerry Joseph & the Jackmormons – Conscious Contact
- 2004 Stockholm Syndrome – Holy Happy Hour
- 2004 Slang – More Talk About Tonight
- 2011 Stockholm Syndrome – Apollo
- 2014 Hard Working Americans – Hard Working Americans
- 2016 Jerry Joseph – By The Time Your Rocket Gets To Mars
- 2016 Daniel Hutchens – The Beautiful Vicious Cycle of Life
- 2016 Hard Working Americans – Rest in Chaos
- 2017 Hard Working Americans – We're All in This Together
- 2017 Jerry Joseph – Weird Blood
- 2019 Bailey Ingle – In Love With The Memories (single)
- 2019 Tim Bluhm – The Only Solution (single)
- 2019 Colonel & The Mermaids - I Do My Best To Keep From Crumbling/Springfield (7")
- 2019 Kimock – Satellite City
- 2019 Andy Frasco & The UN – Change of Pace
- 2019/TBD Trongone Band - Untitled
- 2020 Pacific Range - "Comin' After You" 12"
- 2022 Farmer Dave & The Wizards Of The West - "Second Summer" LP

=== As executive producer ===
- 1999 Drive-By Truckers – Pizza Deliverance
- 2007 Maserati – Inventions For the New Season

== Awards ==
- Georgia Music Hall of Fame 2008
- Billboard Magazine "Road Warrior" Award 2008
- Red Rocks Amphitheatre (Morrison, Colorado) Record for Sell Outs (51)
- Philips Arena (Atlanta) Record for Sell Outs (17)
- Distinguished Alum Award from Collegiate School in 2004
