= Jessica Moss =

Musician

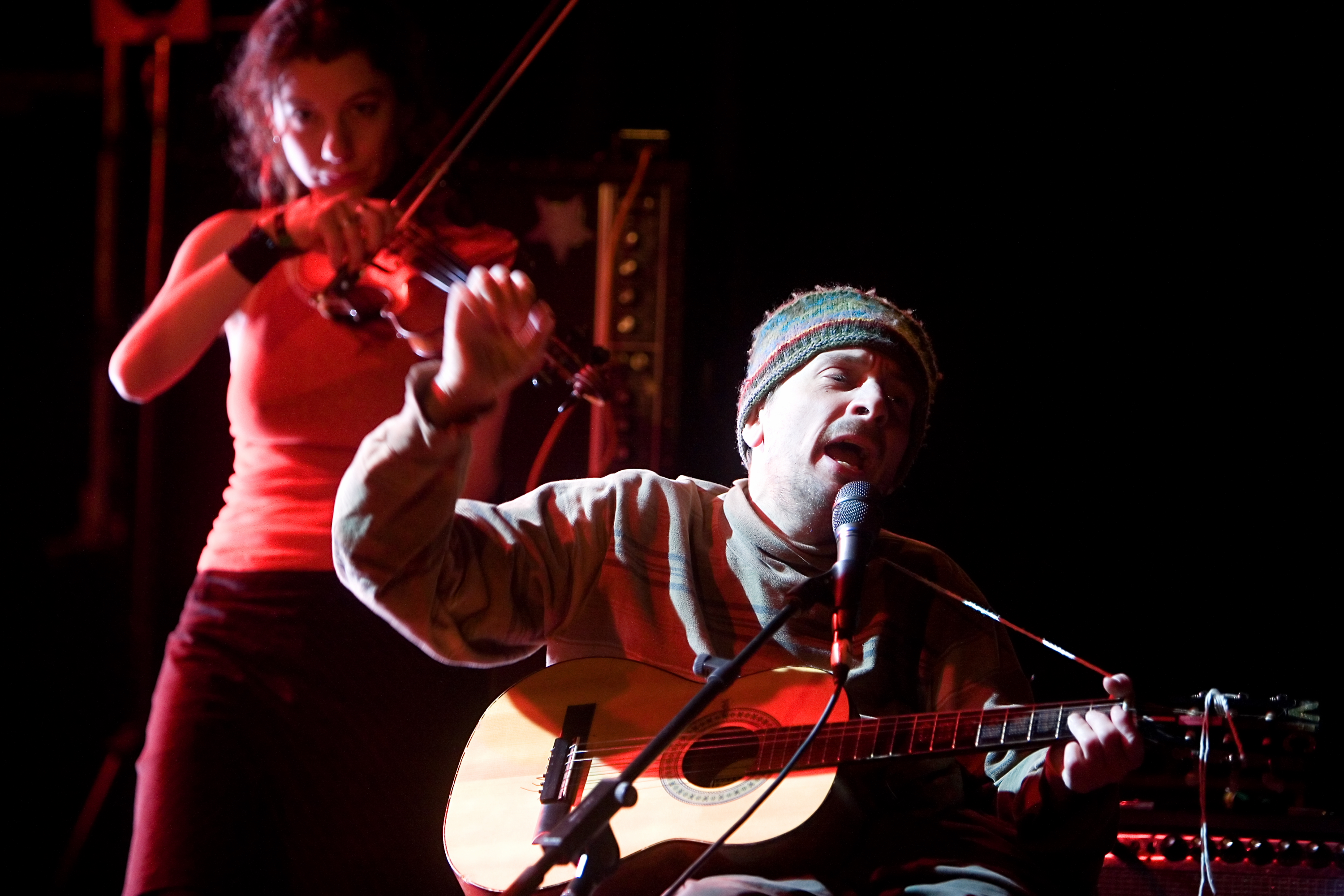
- Moss backing Vic Chesnutt in 2008

Background information
- Born: Canada
- Genres: Post-rock
- Occupation: Musician
- Years active: 1995–present
- Labels: Constellation

Jessica Moss is a Canadian musician best known for playing violin and singing backing vocals in the post-rock band Thee Silver Mt. Zion Memorial Orchestra & Tra-La-La Band since 2001. She is a founding member of Black Ox Orkestar.

In addition, Moss has also been a guest player on many albums produced in Montreal and Toronto, including albums by Frankie Sparo, Arcade Fire, and Broken Social Scene.

== Career ==
Moss's was in Nerdy Girl with Cecil Castelucci. She then played violin in the Montreal alt-rock band Fidget, which she joined in 1995 and left in 1997. She plays regularly in local Arabic and Balkan music ensembles. In addition, she has toured with the Geraldine Fibbers, and was production coordinator for the Montreal film collective Automatic Vaudeville, to which she also contributed music and acting to numerous productions.

She began playing the violin when she was five. She is also known to create illuminated boxes, metal flowers and figurines, wristbands, and soundtracks for film.

== Personal life ==
Moss lives in Montreal, and is a part owner of Local 23, a vintage clothing and curiosities shop in the Mile End district.

In 2009, Moss gave birth to her son with Silver Mt. Zion bandmate Efrim Menuck.

== Discography ==
=== As Jessica Moss ===
- Under Plastic Island (2015)
- Pools of Light (2017)
- Entanglement (2018)
- Phosphenes (2021)
- Galaxy Heart (2022)
- Unfolding (2025)

=== With Thee Silver Mt. Zion Memorial Orchestra & Tra-La-La Band ===
- Born into Trouble as the Sparks Fly Upward (2001)
- "This Is Our Punk-Rock," Thee Rusted Satellites Gather + Sing, (2003)
- The "Pretty Little Lightning Paw" E.P. (EP, 2004)
- Horses in the Sky (2005)
- 13 Blues for Thirteen Moons (2008)
- Kollaps Tradixionales (2010)
- The West Will Rise Again (EP, 2012)
- Fuck Off Get Free We Pour Light on Everything (2014)
- Hang On To Each Other (EP, 2014)

=== With Black Ox Orkestar ===
- Ver Tanzt? (2004)
- Nisht Azoy (2006)
- Everything Returns (2022)

=== With others ===
- Radio One – ...Transit Radio, Observed (1995): violin on track 3
- Paper Angee – Observing Miss Spent (1996)
- Godspeed You! Black Emperor – F♯ A♯ ∞ (1997)
- Sackville – The Principles of Science (1999): vocals on track 2
- Frankie Sparo – My Red Scare (2000)
- Broken Social Scene – Feel Good Lost (2001): tracks 1 and 9
- Frankie Sparo – Arena Hostile (2001)
- K.C. Accidental – Anthems for the Could've Bin Pills (2001)
- Broken Social Scene – You Forgot It In People (2002): tracks 2, 7, and 13
- Frankie Sparo – Welcome Crummy Mystics (2003)
- Hannah Marcus – Desert Farmers (2004): horns on track 8, violin on tracks 4, 6, 7, and 9
- Arcade Fire – Funeral (2004): track 7
- Reminder – Continuum (2006)
- Eric Chenaux – Dull Lights (2006)
- Carla Bozulich – Evangelista (2006): tracks 1, 3, 6, and 7
- Vic Chesnutt – North Star Deserter (2007)
- Tiago Bettencourt & Mantha – O Jardim (2007)
- Because Of Ghosts – This Culture Of Background Noise (2008)
- Evangelista – Hello, Voyager (2008)
- Grant Hart – Hot Wax (2009): violin on track 2
- The Wooden Sky – If I Don't Come Home You'll Know I'm Gone (2009): violin on tracks 4 and 8
- Vitamin String Quartet – Per_Versions (2009): arrangement on track 2
- Elfin Saddle – Ringing For The Begin Again (2009)
- Vic Chesnutt – At the Cut (2009)
- Basia Bulat – Heart Of My Own (2010)
- Efrim Manuel Menuck – Plays "High Gospel" (2011)
- Evangelista – In Animal Tongue (2011)
- Anthony von Seck – My Best Friend in Exile (2011)
- Rebecca Gates And The Consortium – The Float (2012)
- Jung People – Gold Bristle! (2013): violin on tracks 1, 2, 4, and 6
- Katie Moore – Fooled By The Fun (2015)
- BIG|BRAVE – Au De La (2015)
- Plants And Animals – Waltzed In From The Rumbling (2016)
- Blue Hawaii – Tenderness (2017)
- Zu – Jhator (2017)
- BIG|BRAVE – Ardor (2017)
- Sarah Davachi – All My Circles Run (2017)
- Godspeed You! Black Emperor – Luciferian Towers (2017): photo
- Technical Kidman – Bend Everything (2017): violin on track 8
- Sarah Davachi – Gave In Rest (2018)
- Hipelaye – Unfinished Business (2018): violin on track 6
- Oiseaux-Tempête – From Somewhere Invisible (2019)
- Matana Roberts – Coin Coin Chapter Four: Memphis (2019)
- Daniel O'Sullivan – Folly (2019)
- Roy Montgomery – Last Year's Man / After Vermeer (EP, 2019): violin on track 2
- Oiseaux-Tempête – What On Earth (Que Diable) (2022)
