= Fuck Off Get Free We Pour Light on Everything =

2014 album

Studio album by Thee Silver Mt. Zion Memorial Orchestra
- Released: January 20, 2014
- Recorded: 2013
- Studios: Hotel2Tango, Montreal
- Genre: Experimental rock
- Length: 49:17
- Label: Constellation CST099

Thee Silver Mt. Zion Memorial Orchestra chronology
Kollaps Tradixionales (2010)	Fuck Off Get Free We Pour Light on Everything (2014)	Hang on to Each Other (2014)

Professional ratings
Aggregate scores
Source	Rating
AnyDecentMusic?	7.6/10
Metacritic	78/100
Review scores
Source	Rating
AllMusic	4.5/5 stars
Consequence of Sound	B+
Exclaim!	9/10
The Independent	3/5 stars
Mojo	4/5 stars
NME	7/10
Paste	9.3/10
Pitchfork	8.0/10
The Skinny	4/5 stars
Uncut	7/10

Fuck Off Get Free We Pour Light on Everything is the seventh and final studio album by the Canadian experimental rock group Thee Silver Mt. Zion Memorial Orchestra, released on January 20, 2014, by Constellation Records.

The final track is dedicated to Capital Steez, a Brooklyn rapper who committed suicide the previous year.

== Track listing ==
No.	Title	Length
1.	"Fuck Off Get Free (For the Island of Montreal)"	10:22
2.	"Austerity Blues"	14:17
3.	"Take Away These Early Grave Blues"	6:47
4.	"Little Ones Run"	2:29
5.	"What We Loved Was Not Enough"	11:22
6.	"Rains Thru the Roof at Thee Grande Ballroom (For Capital Steez)"	3:57

== Personnel ==
- Thierry Amar: Upright bass, electric bass, plucked piano, vocals
- Efrim Menuck: Electric guitar, acoustic guitar, mellotron, vocals
- Jessica Moss: Violin, plucked piano, vocals
- Sophie Trudeau: Violin, plucked piano, vocals
- David Payant: Drums, organ, vocals
