= 13 Blues for Thirteen Moons =

2008 album

Studio album by Thee Silver Mt. Zion Memorial Orchestra & Tra-La-La Band
- Released: March 10, 2008
- Recorded: Hotel2Tango
- Length: 59:10
- Label: Constellation
- Producer: Howard Bilerman

Thee Silver Mt. Zion Memorial Orchestra & Tra-La-La Band chronology
Horses in the Sky (2005)	13 Blues for Thirteen Moons (2008)	Kollaps Tradixionales (2010)

Professional ratings
Review scores
Source	Rating
Allmusic	4.5/5 stars
Pitchfork Media	(5.2/10)
Rockfeedback	4/5 stars
The Skinny	4/5 stars
Sonic Frontiers	10/13 stars

13 Blues for Thirteen Moons is the fifth full-length album by the Canadian post-rock group Thee Silver Mt. Zion Memorial Orchestra & Tra-La-La Band. The album was released in March 2008. The album consists of an instrumental feedback intro, split into twelve extremely short tracks, and four full songs, which had been played live on recent tours. Band member Efrim Menuck stated that the idea for the 12 short intro tracks initially was suggested because the band wanted the album to start on track 13. The deciding factor for including the tracks, however, was that "if people tried to play it on their iPods, on shuffle mode, it’d blitz their iPod."

The liner notes are found in the CD booklet titled Himnos de Sion—Spanish for "Hymns of Zion". The booklet also contains lyric sheets, presented in the block-capital handwriting familiar with owners of other Silver Mt. Zion records. As such, this is the first album package by the band to contain conventional lyrics.

== Track listing ==
No.	Title	Length
1.	"[untitled]"	0:05
2.	"[untitled]"	0:04
3.	"[untitled]"	0:04
4.	"[untitled]"	0:05
5.	"[untitled]"	0:06
6.	"[untitled]"	0:05
7.	"[untitled]"	0:06
8.	"[untitled]"	0:06
9.	"[untitled]"	0:06
10.	"[untitled]"	0:07
11.	"[untitled]"	0:07
12.	"[untitled]"	0:11
13.	"1,000,000 Died to Make This Sound"	14:42
14.	"13 Blues for Thirteen Moons"	16:45
15.	"Black Waters Blowed/Engine Broke Blues"	13:05
16.	"BlindBlindBlind"	13:17

== Personnel ==
Thee Silver Mt. Zion Memorial Orchestra & Tra-La-La Band

- Thierry Amar – contrabass, electric bass, vocals
- Eric Craven – drums, vocals
- Beckie Foon – cello, vocals
- Ian Ilavsky – guitar, organ
- Efrim Menuck – guitar, vocals
- Jessica Moss – violin, vocals
- Sophie Trudeau – violin, vocals

Additional musicians

- Brian Lipson – trumpet on "13 Blues for Thirteen Moons"
- Nadia Moss – organ on "13 Blues for Thirteen Moons"

Technical

- Howard Bilerman – production
- Radwan Moumneh – production
- Harris Newman – mastering
