= Black Ox Orkestar =

Canadian music group

- Origin: Montreal, Quebec, Canada
- Genres: Klezmer, experimental folk
- Years active: 2000–2005, 2020-present
- Label: Constellation Records
- Members: Stéphane Diamantakiou; Scott Levine Gilmore; Gabriel Levine; Jessica Moss
- Past members: Thierry Amar

Black Ox Orkestar is a quartet that formed in Montreal, Quebec in 2000, who play modern Jewish diasporic music that draws influence from Klezmer, Romani, Arabic, Balkan, and other East European traditions alongside indie rock, experimental folk and avant-jazz. The band interprets traditional tunes and composes originals sung primarily in Yiddish.

The members are Stéphane Diamantakiou, Scott Gilmore, Gabriel Levine, Jessica Moss, and Thierry Amar, having left the band in 2024; they were also active in various other notable Montréal bands in the 1990s–2000s including Godspeed You! Black Emperor, Thee Silver Mt. Zion, and Sackville. Thierry Amar continues to play in Godspeed You! Black Emperor and Jessica Moss pursues a solo practice rooted in electroacoustic violin composition.

Black Ox Orkestar released two albums on Constellation Records in 2004 and 2006. The band reunited in 2021 and announced a new album Everything Returns on October 20, 2022, which was released on December 2, 2022.

== History ==
They formed in the summer of 2000 to explore their common Jewish heritage through music, which was entirely acoustic and sung in Yiddish. Constellation Records released two albums, Ver Tanzt? in 2004, and Nisht Azoy in 2006, both albums recorded in Montreal's Hotel2Tango studio). The band played live through 2006.

Following the band's hiatus, Thierry Amar (contrabass) continued as a member of Thee Silver Mt. Zion, and Godspeed You! Black Emperor and is one of the co-founders of Hotel2Tango recording studio in Montreal. Scott Levine Gilmore (vocals, cymbalom, guitar, mandolin, piano) played with Thee Silver Mt. Zion and Land of Kush with composer Sam Shalabi. He played in Luftmentsch Fareyn with Josh Dolgin, and was a founding member of Le Petit Théâtre de l'Absolu, a puppet theatre that toured through Israel and the West Bank in 2003. Gabriel Levine (clarinet, bass clarinet, guitar) played in Sackville, Land of Kush, and the Wild Lawns. He worked in Vermont for the Bread and Puppet Theater, and was a co-founder of Le Petit Théâtre de l'Absolu. Levine has published Art and Tradition in a Time of Uprisings with MIT Press in 2020. Jessica Moss (violin) has released five solo records in her own name, was a member of Thee Silver Mt. Zion, and has contributed to recordings by Vic Chesnutt, Carla Bozulich, Big Brave, Sarah Davachi, and Broken Social Scene.

Following an interview with Jewish Currents magazine conducted in August 2020, the group has reunited and recorded their first new music in more than a decade. The song "Mizrakh mi ma'arav" was released as a flexi disc 7" by the magazine as a gift to its subscribers.

Everything Returns, the band's third full-length album and first new music in fifteen years, was released in December 2022 via Constellation Records. The album consists of 9 tracks, with vocals, piano, violin, upright bass, clarinet, and cymbalom. Recorded by Greg Norman (Jason Molina, Nina Nastasia, Electrical Audio). The songs are sung in a combination of Yiddish and English, and explore identity, migration, nationalism, and the Jewish diaspora.

== Discography ==
- Ver Tanzt? (Constellation Records, 2004)
- Nisht Azoy (Constellation Records, 2006)
- Everything Returns (Constellation Records, 2022)

== Le Petit Théâtre de l'Absolu ==
Le Petit Théâtre de l'Absolu was a Puppetry theater troupe founded in Montreal, and active from 2001 to 2005. It was co-founded by Gabriel Levine and Scott Levine Gilmore of Black Ox Orkestar. The theater's work consisted of Toy theater shows based on revolutionary history, performed in Canada, the U.S., France, and Spain. Levine's work broadly departs from a recontextualization of traditional and vernacular forms of performance, reinventing and reimagining performance genres articulated via contemporary social concerns. Levine had previously worked in Vermont for the Bread and Puppet Theater in the late 1990s.

Early work includes Paris in the 19th Century Part 3: Demolition Polka and Part 4: La Commune. In 2001, Le Petit Theatre de L'Absolu performed at the Chicago Cultural Center as part of Puppetropolis, a two-week, city-sponsored festival of puppet theater.

In the autumn of 2003, the theatre toured their children's show, The Rooster and the King, through the occupied Palestinian territories, performing in schools, community centres, and refugee camps. This tour included a performance at the Palestinian National Theatre in Jerusalem as part of the 13th international Puppet Festival, in September 2005. The alt.theatre journal described their work as "activist puppet theatre ... using history to rekindle revolutionary flames and tackle contemporary social issues."

Also in 2005, Le Petit Theatre de l’Absolu performed as part of the 7th Toy Theatre Festival, held at St. Ann's Warehouse in Brooklyn, New York. Steve Abrams writes that they performed "Birds of the Coming Storm, directed by Hermine Ortega, [which] offered stories of seven anarchist demonstrators in 19th-century Chicago who were executed for protesting factory working conditions." Birds of the Coming Storm dealt with the events of Chicago's Haymarket affair.
