= Plays "High Gospel" =

- CD release cover

Studio album by Efrim Manuel Menuck
- Released: May 24, 2011
- Recorded: Hotel2Tango, Various
- Genre: Experimental rock, post-rock, alternative rock
- Length: 42:08
- Label: Constellation
- Producer: Efrim Manuel Menuck

Professional ratings
Review scores
Source	Rating
The Big Takeover	Extremely positive
The Quietus	Extremely positive
Pitchfork	7.6/10
Drowned in Sound	6/10
The Skinny	4/5 stars

Plays "High Gospel" (2011) is the debut album from Canadian musician Efrim Menuck, best known for his work as a founding member of Godspeed You! Black Emperor and Thee Silver Mt. Zion. The album alternates instrumental and vocal tracks, an aspect of his work which began with the Silver Mt. Zion album Horses in the Sky. It was self produced and recorded at the Hotel2Tango and various other locations in Canada in 2010.

== Overview ==
The Constellation record page describes the release as a "personal album that serves as an ode to his adopted Montreal hometown (where he has now lived for two decades), the passing of great friends (Vic Chesnutt, Emma) and new fatherhood." The album art is a painting of Efrim with his son Ezra, whom he fathered with Mt. Zion bandmate Jessica Moss, and who is sung about in the album's final track.

== Track listing ==
1. "Our Lady of Parc Extension and Her Munificent Sorrows" – 7:00
2. "A 12-pt. Program for Keep on Keepin' On" – 9:00
3. "August Four, Year-of-Our-Lord Blues" – 3:01
4. "Heavy Calls & Hospitals Blues" – 2:33
5. "Heaven's Engine Is a Dusty Ol' Bellows" – 2:08
6. "Kaddish for Chesnutt" – 7:18
7. "Chickadees' Roar Pt. 2" – 4:44
8. "I Am No Longer a Motherless Child" – 6:24

All music and lyrics by Efrim Manuel Menuck

== Personnel ==
- Efrim Menuck – guitar, piano, voice, mixing, samples
- Jessica Moss – violin on tracks 1, 3 and 8
- David Payant - drums on tracks 1, 2 and 8
- Katie Moore - vocals on track 1
