= Kollaps Tradixionales =

2010 album

Studio album by Thee Silver Mt. Zion Memorial Orchestra
- Released: February 8, 2010 (Europe); February 16, 2010 (World)
- Recorded: Hotel2Tango, Montreal, 2009
- Length: 56:40
- Label: Constellation _{CST063}
- Producer: Howard Bilerman

Thee Silver Mt. Zion Memorial Orchestra chronology
13 Blues for Thirteen Moons (2008)	Kollaps Tradixionales (2010)	Fuck Off Get Free We Pour Light on Everything (2014)

Professional ratings
Aggregate scores
Source	Rating
Metacritic	78/100
Review scores
Source	Rating
AllMusic	4/5 stars
Pitchfork Media	(7.3/10)
PopMatters	9/10 stars
The Skinny	4/5 stars

Kollaps Tradixionales (pronounced "Collapse Traditionals") is the sixth full-length album by the experimental rock group Thee Silver Mt. Zion Memorial Orchestra. It was released in February 2010 on Constellation Records. The songs "I Built Myself a Metal Bird", "I Fed My Metal Bird the Wings of Other Metal Birds" and "There Is a Light" were played on earlier tours.

For this album, the band started a blog on their official website. This is also the first record with drummer David Payant, after the former drummer Eric Craven left the band.

Typical for Constellation Records releases, the album was released with some extras. The CD comes in a gatefold, paperboard jacket. The vinyl is available as a double 10" that includes a copy of the CD, a 16-page art book with collages made by Menuck and filmmaker/photographer Jem Cohen, and a limited edition poster.

== Track listing ==
No.	Title	Length
1.	"There Is a Light"	15:19
2.	"I Built Myself a Metal Bird"	6:17
3.	"I Fed My Metal Bird the Wings of Other Metal Birds"	6:18
4.	"Kollapz Tradixional (Thee Olde Dirty Flag)"	6:09
5.	"Collapse Traditional (For Darling)"	1:29
6.	"Kollaps Tradicional (Bury 3 Dynamos)"	6:48
7.	"'Piphany Rambler"	14:19
Total length:		56:40

== Personnel ==
Thee Silver Mt. Zion Memorial Orchestra

- Thierry Amar – contrabass, horn arrangement, vocals
- Efrim Menuck – guitar, organ, piano, vocals
- Jessica Moss – violin, vocals
- David Payant – drums, organ, piano, vocals
- Sophie Trudeau – violin, vocals

Horn section on "There Is a Light"

- Gordon Allen – trumpet
- Adam Kinner – tenor saxophone
- Matana Roberts – alto saxophone
- Jason Sharp – baritone saxophone

Production

- Howard Bilerman – production
- Radwan Moumneh – production
- Harris Newman at Greymarket – mastering
