= I'm Bad Now =

Studio album by Nap Eyes
- Released: March 9, 2018
- Studios: Hotel2Tango, Montreal, Quebec
- Genre: Indie rock
- Length: 46:45
- Labels: You've Changed Records (Canada); Paradise of Bachelors (US); Jagjaguwar (Worldwide)

Nap Eyes chronology
Thought Rock Fish Scale (2016)	I'm Bad Now (2018)	Snapshot of a Beginner (2020)

Singles from I'm Bad Now
- 1. "Every Time the Feeling" Released: January 12, 2018

Professional ratings
Aggregate scores
Source	Rating
Metacritic	77/100
Review scores
Source	Rating
AllMusic	4/5 stars
Drowned in Sound	7/10
Exclaim!	8/10
The Line of Best Fit	9/10
Paste	8.2/10

I'm Bad Now is the third studio album by Canadian indie rock band Nap Eyes. It was released on March 9, 2018 under You've Changed Records in Canada, Paradise of Bachelors in the US and Jagjaguwar everywhere else.

== Critical reception ==
I'm Bad Now was met with "generally favorable" reviews from critics. At Metacritic, which assigns a weighted average rating out of 100 to reviews from mainstream publications, this release received an average score of 77, based on 12 reviews. Aggregator Album of the Year gave the release a 75 out of 100 based on a critical consensus of 12 reviews.

=== Accolades ===
Accolades for I'm Bad Now
Publication	Accolade	Rank
AllMusic	AllMusic's Favorite Indie Pop/Indie Rock Albums of 2018	N/A
MusicOMH	MusicOMH's Top 50 Albums of 2018	47

== Track listing ==
I'm Bad Now track listing
No.	Title	Length
1.	"Every Time the Feeling"	3:11
2.	"I'm Bad"	5:15
3.	"Judgment"	4:15
4.	"Roses"	3:26
5.	"Follow Me Down"	4:01
6.	"You Like to Joke Around with Me"	2:38
7.	"Dull Me Line"	3:27
8.	"Sage"	5:02
9.	"Hearing the Bass"	2:28
10.	"White Disciple"	6:19
11.	"Boats Appear"	6:43

== Personnel ==
Musicians

- Nigel Chapman – vocals
- Josh Salter – bass
- Brad Loughead – guitar
- Seamus Dalton – drums

Production

- Howard Bilerman – engineer, mixer
- Mike Wright – engineer, mixer
- Josh Bonati – mastering

== Release history ==
Region	Date	Label	Format(s)	Catalog
Canada	March 9, 2018	You've Changed Records	CD, LP	YC-033
United States	March 9, 2018	Paradise of Bachelors	CD, LP	POB-033
Worldwide	March 9, 2018	Jagjaguwar	CD, LP	JAG318
