= The "Pretty Little Lightning Paw" E.P. =

EP by Thee Silver Mountain Reveries
- Released: May 10, 2004
- Recorded: Second half of 2003 at the Hotel 2 Tango
- Length: 30:16
- Label: Constellation CST030

Thee Silver Mountain Reveries chronology
| "This Is Our Punk-Rock," Thee Rusted Satellites Gather + Sing, (2003) | The "Pretty Little Lightning Paw" E.P. (2004) | Horses in the Sky (2005) |

Professional ratings
Review scores
| Source | Rating |
|---|---|
| AllMusic | 3/5 stars |
| Pitchfork Media | (7.6/10) |

The "Pretty Little Lightning Paw" E.P. is an EP by Thee Silver Mt. Zion Memorial Orchestra & Tra-La-La Band under the name Thee Silver Mountain Reveries. It was released May 2004 on Constellation Records. The name the band assumed for this EP was temporary; they have since reverted to using Thee Silver Mt. Zion Memorial Orchestra.

Many of the band members switched instruments for this recording. For example, Sophie Trudeau, who usually plays violin, plays bass guitar. Ian Ilavsky, usually one of the band's guitarists, plays drums. When recording was complete, the EP was played on a boombox and rerecorded from that, giving it a rough sound.

On the track, "There's a River in the Valley Made of Melting Snow", the Hebrew lyric, "baruch atta adonai" (ברוך אתה אדוני), means "bless the Lord".

== Track listing ==
1. "More Action! Less Tears!" – 5:20
2. "Microphones in the Trees" – 9:47
3. "Pretty Little Lightning Paw" – 10:01
4. "There's a River in the Valley Made of Melting Snow" – 5:08

== Personnel ==
Thee Silver Mountain Reveries

- Thierry Amar – violin, bass guitar, vocals, pianohandle
- Ian Ilavsky – drums
- Efrim Menuck – guitar, piano, organ, vocals, feedback, toybox
- Jessica Moss – violin, vocals
- Sophie Trudeau – bass guitar

Other musicians

- Aimee – yells on "More Action! Less Tears!"
- Chad – vocals on "Microphones in the Trees" and "Pretty Little Lightning Paw"
- Nadia – vocals on "Microphones in the Trees" and "Pretty Little Lightning Paw"

Technical

- Harris Newman – mastering
