= Born into Trouble as the Sparks Fly Upward =

2001 album

Studio album by The Silver Mt. Zion Memorial Orchestra & Tra-La-La Band
- Released: October 8, 2001 (Europe); October 23, 2001 (World)
- Recorded: Hotel2Tango
- Length: 58:26
- Label: Constellation CST018
- Producer: Howard Bilerman

The Silver Mt. Zion Memorial Orchestra & Tra-La-La Band chronology
| He Has Left Us Alone but Shafts of Light Sometimes Grace the Corner of Our Rooms... (2000) | Born into Trouble as the Sparks Fly Upward (2001) | "This Is Our Punk-Rock," Thee Rusted Satellites Gather + Sing, (2003) |

Professional ratings
Review scores
| Source | Rating |
|---|---|
| AllMusic | 4.5/5 stars |
| Fluffhouse Music Reviews | 9/10 stars |
| Pitchfork Media | (7.7/10.0) |

Born into Trouble as the Sparks Fly Upward is the second album by the Canadian band The Silver Mt. Zion Memorial Orchestra & Tra-La-La Band. It was released by Constellation Records in October 2001.

The title is drawn from the Book of Job: "Yet man is born unto trouble, as the sparks fly upwards" (5:7). It could also be taken from Jerome K. Jerome's Three Men in a Boat, where the same passage is paraphrased.

"This Gentle Hearts Like Shot Bird's Fallen" was used in the climax to the David Gordon Green film Snow Angels.

The album finds the band expanding from three members to six, with a similarly expanded name.

== Track listing ==
| No. | Title | Length |
|---|---|---|
| 1. | "Sisters! Brothers! Small Boats of Fire Are Falling From the Sky!" | 9:07 |
| 2. | "This Gentle Hearts Like Shot Bird's Fallen" | 5:47 |
| 3. | "Built Then Burnt [Hurrah! Hurrah!]" | 5:41 |
| 4. | "Take These Hands and Throw Them in the River" | 7:01 |
| 5. | "Could've Moved Mountains..." | 11:02 |
| 6. | "Tho You Are Gone I Still Often Walk W/You" | 4:48 |
| 7. | "C'monCOMEON (Loose An Endless Longing)" | 8:06 |
| 8. | "The Triumph of Our Tired Eyes" | 6:54 |
| Total length: | | 58:26 |

== Personnel ==
The Silver Mt. Zion Memorial Orchestra and Tra-la-la Band

- Thierry Amar – contrabass, vocals
- Beckie Foon – cello
- Ian Ilavsky – guitar, organ
- Efrim Menuck – guitar, piano, vocals, tapes, effects
- Jessica Moss – violin, vocals
- Sophie Trudeau – violin, vocals

Other musicians

- Eric Craven – drums
- Jonah Fortune – trumpet, trombone on "C'mon Come on (Loose an Endless Longing)"
- Mischa and Sara – voices

Technical

- Howard Bilerman – production
- Harris Newman – mastering
