= He Has Left Us Alone but Shafts of Light Sometimes Grace the Corner of Our Rooms... =

2000 album by A Silver Mt. Zion

He Has Left Us Alone but Shafts of Light Sometimes Grace the Corner of Our Rooms…

Studio album by A Silver Mt. Zion
- Released: March 13, 2000 (Europe); March 27, 2000 (world)
- Recorded: November 1999 at the Hotel2Tango in Montreal, Quebec, Canada.
- Genre: Post-rock
- Length: 47:11
- Label: Constellation
- Producers: Efrim Menuck; Thierry Amar

A Silver Mt. Zion chronology
He Has Left Us Alone but Shafts of Light Sometimes Grace the Corner of Our Rooms… (2000)	Born into Trouble as the Sparks Fly Upward (2001)

He Has Left Us Alone but Shafts of Light Sometimes Grace the Corner of Our Rooms... is the debut studio album by Canadian post-rock group A Silver Mt. Zion. The album was recorded by guitarist Efrim Menuck and bassist Thierry Amar at the Hotel2Tango in 1999, mostly during breaks while touring with Godspeed You! Black Emperor. It was published by the Montreal-based record label Constellation on March 27, 2000.

The album was born out of a desire by Efrim Menuck to record something for his dog Wanda, who died of cancer while Godspeed You! Black Emperor were on tour. Menuck described the recording of the album as a "Jewish experience," due to his immersion within a small, friend-based Jewish community in Montreal. Menuck also stated that, as a result of the community, the album title and songs have a sense of Judaism, although the band tried to not make it conspicuous. There is some Jewish imagery in the lyrics to the track "Movie (Never Made)", but their exact meaning remains cryptic.

The album was initially to be named He Has Left Us Alone, but it was decided that this was too weak, and didn't convey the proper mood. Menuck professed that he was confused with the idea that songs or album titles should only be a few words in length and be perfectly clear. Instead, Menuck believes that things of that nature can be described with many words, giving sensibility and a "frame" to the work.

On the original vinyl release, the songs were arranged into two tracks; on CD releases, the songs were indexed into four parts each, resulting in eight tracks. The sleeve artwork lists inaccurate track times, all rounded to even minutes.

The 5th track "13 Angels Standing Guard 'round the Side of Your Bed" was featured in Harmony Korine's movie Mister Lonely and 2016 British drama The Levelling. It appears in episode 3 of 2023 HBO documentary Love Has Won: The Cult of Mother God. It also features as a recurring motif in seasons 3 and 4 of Top Boy. Additionally, it was sampled on the Injury Reserve track “What a Year It's Been” from their 2019 self-titled album.

== Reception ==
Professional ratings
Review scores
Source	Rating
AllMusic	4/5 stars
NME	8/10
Pitchfork	9.0/10
Select	4/5

Reviewing the album for Pitchfork, Matt LeMay called the album "an accomplishment of passion, skill, and above all, an almost supernatural talent".

== Track listing ==
=== Vinyl edition ===
Side one
No.	Title	Length
1.	"Lonely as the Sound of Lying on the Ground of an Airplane Going Down"	23:16

Side two
No.	Title	Length
2.	"The World Is SickSICK; (So Kiss Me Quick)!"	23:52

=== CD edition ===
No.	Title	Length
1.	"Broken Chords Can Sing a Little"	8:40
2.	"Sit in the Middle of Three Galloping Dogs"	5:08
3.	"Stumble Then Rise on Some Awkward Morning"	6:05
4.	"Movie (Never Made)"	3:23
5.	"13 Angels Standing Guard 'round the Side of Your Bed"	7:22
6.	"Long March Rocket or Doomed Airliner"	0:05
7.	"Blown-Out Joy from Heaven's Mercied Hole"	9:47
8.	"For Wanda"	6:38

== Personnel ==
A Silver Mt. Zion

- Thierry Amar – double bass, bass guitar, production
- Efrim Menuck – piano, guitar, organ, vocals, radio, production
- Sophie Trudeau – violin, vocals

Other musicians

- Aidan Girt – drums on "Sit in the Middle of Three Galloping Dogs", tapes on "For Wanda"
- Gordon Krieger – bass clarinet on "Blown-out Joy from Heaven's Mercied Hole"
- Sam Shalabi – guitar on "Blown-out Joy from Heaven's Mercied Hole"
