= "This Is Our Punk-Rock," Thee Rusted Satellites Gather + Sing, =

2003 album

Studio album by Thee Silver Mt. Zion Memorial Orchestra & Tra-la-la Band (with choir)
- Released: August 25, 2003 (Europe); September 2, 2003 (World)
- Recorded: Hotel2Tango
- Length: 57:41
- Label: Constellation CST027
- Producer: Howard Bilerman

Thee Silver Mt. Zion Memorial Orchestra & Tra-la-la Band (with choir) chronology
"Born into Trouble as the Sparks Fly Upward" (2001)	"This Is Our Punk-Rock," Thee Rusted Satellites Gather + Sing, (2003)	The "Pretty Little Lightning Paw" E.P. (2004)

Professional ratings
Review scores
Source	Rating
AllMusic	3.5/5 stars
Pitchfork Media	(7.4/10)

"This Is Our Punk-Rock," Thee Rusted Satellites Gather + Sing, is the third studio album by Canadian post-rock band The Silver Mt. Zion Memorial Orchestra & Tra-la-la Band (with choir). It was released August 25, 2003, in Europe and September 2, 2003, in the rest of the world by Constellation Records.

For this album, an amateur choir was assembled from a few dozen friends and colleagues. The liner notes contain a page of the score used by the choir in the opening track (the "fasola" section).

This album was essentially created as a requiem for open and abandoned spaces in Montreal (the band's home town), as well as for similar loss and decay around the world, due to either urban development or military action.

== Track listing ==
No.	Title	Length
1.	"Sow Some Lonesome Corner So Many Flowers Bloom"	16:27
2.	"Babylon Was Built on Fire/StarsNoStars"	14:44
3.	"American Motor over Smoldered Field"	12:05
4.	"Goodbye Desolate Railyard"	14:25
Total length:		57:41

== Personnel ==
The Silver Mt. Zion Memorial Orchestra & Tra-la-la Band (with choir)

- Thierry Amar – contrabass, vocals, mixing
- Beckie Foon – cello, vocals, mixing
- Ian Ilavsky – guitar, vocals, mixing
- Efrim Menuck – guitar, piano, vocals, tapes, effects, mixing
- Jessica Moss – violin, vocals, mixing
- Sophie Trudeau – violin, vocals, mixing

Other musicians

- Howard Bilerman – drums on "Sow Some Lonesome Corner So Many Flowers Bloom"
- Aidan Girt – drums on "American Motor Over Smoldered Field"
- Thee Rusted Satellite Choir – vocals on "Sow Some Lonesome Corner So Many Flowers Bloom" and "Goodbye Desolate Railyard"

Technical

- Howard Bilerman – production, mixing
- Harris Newman – mastering
