= Thierry Amar =

Canadian musician, engineer and producer

- Born: Montreal, Quebec, Canada
- Genres: Punk rock, avant-garde, experimental, jazz, folk, drone
- Occupations: Musician, Engineer, Record producer
- Instrument: Bass
- Years active: 1990–present
- Labels: Constellation; Kranky
- Member of: Thee Silver Mt. Zion Memorial Orchestra; Black Ox Orkestar; Godspeed You! Black Emperor

Thierry Amar is a Canadian musician, engineer and producer. He is a member of Godspeed You! Black Emperor, Thee Silver Mt. Zion Memorial Orchestra & Tra-La-La Band, Earthquake Architecture, Molasses, The Craig Pedersen Quartet and Black Ox Orkestar.

He is co-founder/creator of Hotel2Tango.

== Career ==
Amar joined Godspeed You! Black Emperor around the time of its debut album, F♯ A♯ ∞. He, with Mauro Pezzente, plays the electric bass in the group, along with double bass. When playing with Thee Silver Mt. Zion Memorial Orchestra or Black Ox Orkestar, he usually plays double bass. He also played violin on the EP The "Pretty Little Lightning Paw" E.P..

Amar is also a singer for Thee Silver Mt. Zion Memorial Orchestra & Tra-La-La Band, which shares vocals with all of its band members.

Along with Howard Bilerman, Efrim Menuck and Radwan Moumneh, Amar owns and operates the Hotel2Tango. Once a living space, it is now a professional recording studio, practice area, and live performance venue.

In 2006, Amar, with Efrim Menuck and Sophie Trudeau, assisted in the recording of Carla Bozulich's first release for Constellation, Evangelista.

== Discography ==
=== with Godspeed You! Black Emperor ===
- F♯ A♯ ∞ (1997)
- Slow Riot for New Zero Kanada (1999)
- Lift Your Skinny Fists Like Antennas to Heaven (2000)
- Yanqui U.X.O. (2002)
- 'Allelujah! Don't Bend! Ascend! (2012)
- Asunder, Sweet and Other Distress (2015)
- Luciferian Towers (2017)
- G_d's Pee at State's End! (2021)
- No Title as of 13 February 2024 28,340 Dead (2024)

=== with A Silver Mt. Zion ===
- He Has Left Us Alone but Shafts of Light Sometimes Grace the Corner of Our Rooms... (2000)
- Born into Trouble as the Sparks Fly Upward (2001)
- "This Is Our Punk-Rock," Thee Rusted Satellites Gather + Sing,, (2003)
- The "Pretty Little Lightning Paw" E.P. (2004)
- Horses in the Sky (2005)
- 13 Blues for Thirteen Moons (2008)
- Kollaps Tradixionales (2010)
- Hang On to Each Other (2014)

=== with Black Ox Orkestar ===
- Ver Tanzt? (2004)
- Nisht Azoy (2006)

=== with Molasses ===
- You'll Never Be Well No More (1999)
- Trilogie: Toil & Peaceful Life (2000)
- A Slow Messe (2003)
- Trouble At Jinx Hotel (2004)
