= Sophie Trudeau (musician) =

Canadian singer and violinist

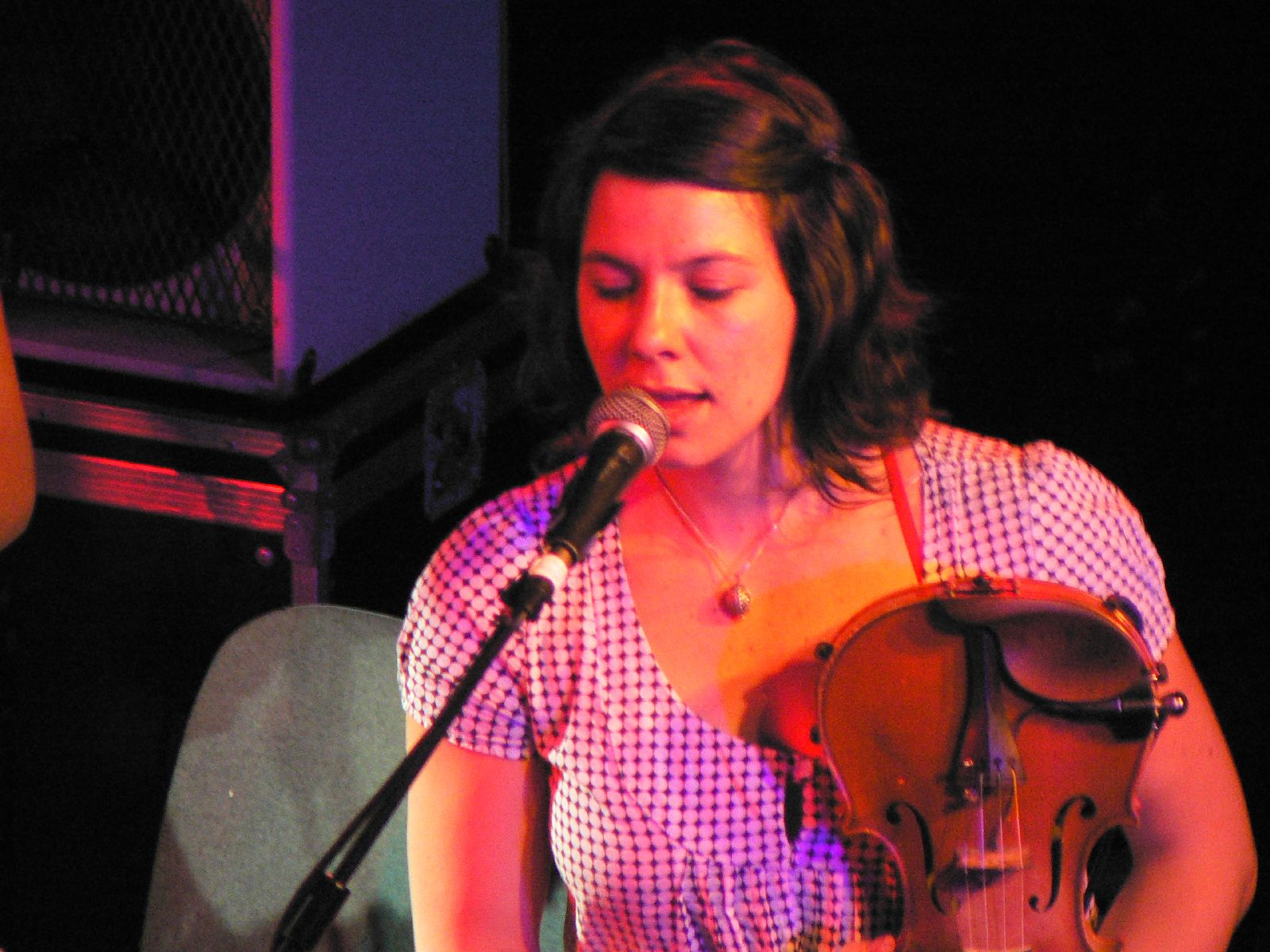
- Trudeau in 2006

Background information
- Born: Canada
- Genres: Post-rock; experimental rock; avant-garde
- Occupations: Musician, singer, violinist
- Years active: 1999–present
- Labels: Kranky; Constellation; Bangor Records

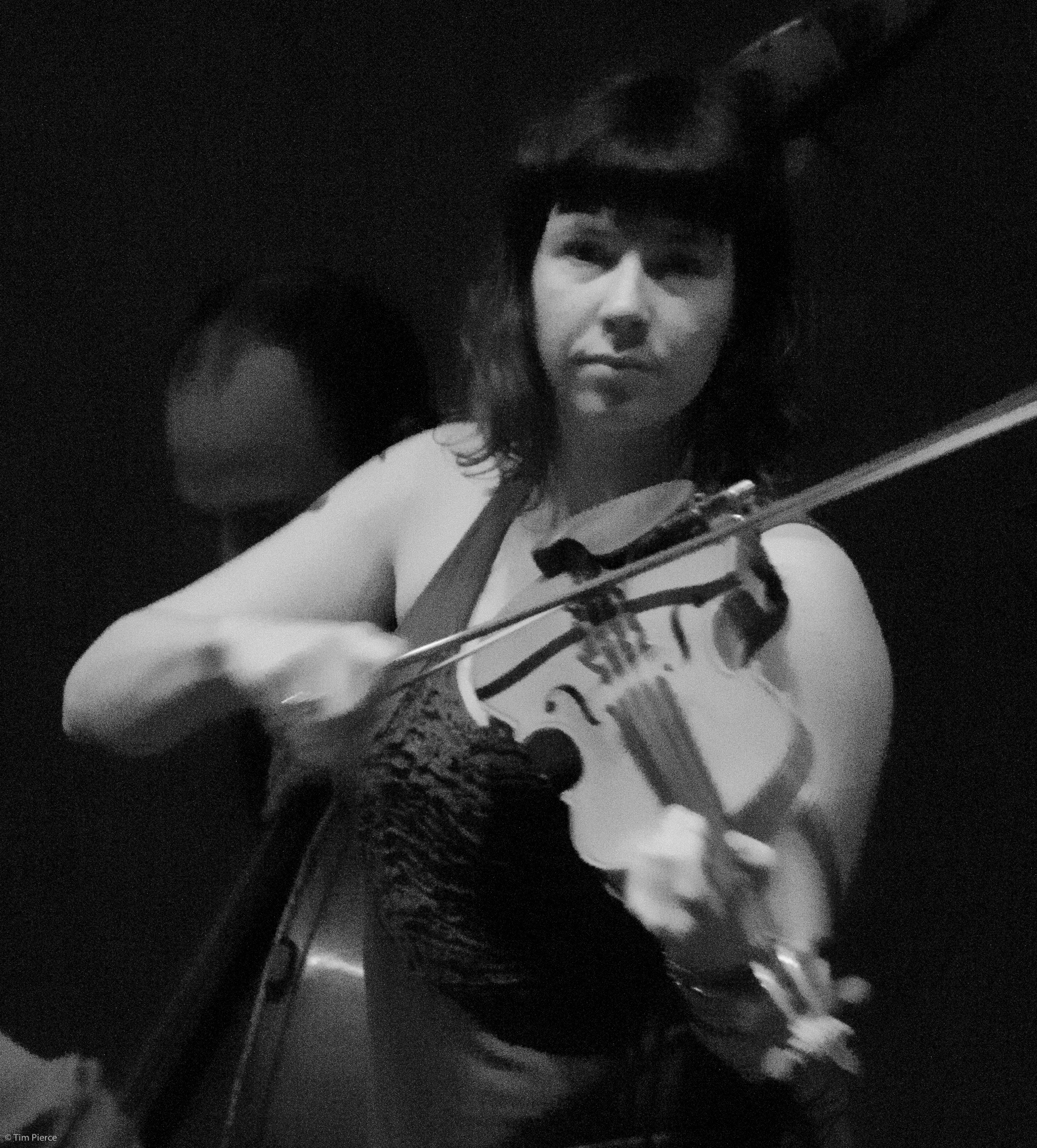
Trudeau playing with Godspeed You! Black Emperor in Boston, Massachusetts, October 2012.

Sophie Trudeau is a Canadian musician. She is best known as a member of Godspeed You! Black Emperor, and co-founder (with Efrim Menuck and Thierry Amar) of Thee Silver Mt. Zion Memorial Orchestra & Tra-La-La Band. She also plays in a number of other bands, including Valley of the Giants and The Mile End Ladies String Auxiliary.

== Biography ==
Trudeau first served as a violinist for Godspeed You! Black Emperor on their first EP, Slow Riot for New Zerø Kanada, which was released in 1999. Trudeau went on later to co-found Thee Silver Mt. Zion Memorial Orchestra & Tra-La-La Band, where she serves as one of two principal violinists. Trudeau has also played the bass guitar on The "Pretty Little Lightning Paw" E.P., as well as trumpet on Horses in the Sky. She is also credited as playing violin on the Arcade Fire track "Wake Up" from their debut album Funeral.

Sharing the responsibility with the other six members, Trudeau sings with Thee Silver Mt. Zion Memorial Orchestra & Tra-La-La Band.

Trudeau was also the founder of Bangor Records. Its roster included her string trio project, The Mile End Ladies String Auxiliary, for which she played violin, along with Beckie Foon of Thee Silver Mt. Zion Memorial Orchestra & Tra-La-La Band on cello and Genevieve Heistek of Hangedup on viola. Their first album, From Cells of Roughest Air, was released by Bangor Records on 1 January 2005. She was also a member of Diebold, a duo who released an album on Bangor in January 2007.

In 2006, Sophie, with Efrim Menuck and Thierry Amar, assisted in the recording of Carla Bozulich's first release for Constellation, Evangelista.

In 2013, Godspeed You! Black Emperor won the Polaris Music Prize for their album 'Allelujah! Don't Bend! Ascend!. While the band was not in attendance to accept the award, representatives from their music label, Constellation Records, stated Godspeed's plan for the $30,000 award is to fund prison music programs: "Godspeed will use the prize money to purchase musical instruments for, and support organizations providing music lessons to, people incarcerated within the Quebec prison system," said Don Wilkie from Constellation.

Recent collaborators with Godspeed include choreographer Dana Gingras of Animals of Distinction and American film maker Jem Cohen. Sophie also balances her time in Godspeed with more experimental projects. She works with visual artists and film influences her music. Sophie's music is featured in numerous feature and experimental film scores. Her recent collaboration with filmmaker Michaela Grill played at L'Alternativa International Film Festival in Barcelona Spain and the Ann Arbor Film Fest.

== Discography ==
=== With Godspeed You! Black Emperor ===
- Slow Riot for New Zerø Kanada (1999)
- Lift Your Skinny Fists Like Antennas to Heaven (2000)
- Yanqui U.X.O. (2002)
- 'Allelujah! Don't Bend! Ascend! (2012)
- Asunder, Sweet and Other Distress (2015)
- Luciferian Towers (2017)
- G_d's Pee at State's End! (2021)
- No Title as of 13 February 2024 28,340 Dead (2024)

=== With A Silver Mt. Zion ===
- He Has Left Us Alone but Shafts of Light Sometimes Grace the Corner of Our Rooms... (2000)
- Born into Trouble as the Sparks Fly Upward (2001)
- "This Is Our Punk-Rock," Thee Rusted Satellites Gather + Sing (2003)
- The "Pretty Little Lightning Paw" E.P. (2004)
- Horses in the Sky (2005)
- 13 Blues for Thirteen Moons (2008)
- Kollaps Tradixionales (2010)
- Fuck Off Get Free We Pour Light on Everything (2014)

=== With Set Fire to Flames ===
- Sings Reign Rebuilder (2001)
- Telegraphs in Negative/Mouths Trapped in Static (2003)

=== With Valley of the Giants ===
- Valley of the Giants (2004)

=== With The Mile End Ladies String Auxiliary ===
- From Cells of Roughest Air (2005)

=== With Diebold ===
- Diebold (2007)
- Listen to My Heartbeast (2008)

=== With Kiss Me Deadly ===
- Misty Medley (2005)

=== With Wrekmeister Harmonies ===
- Light Falls (2016)

=== Solo ===
- confinement songs (2020)
