= Horses in the Sky =

2005 album

- CD release cover

Studio album by Thee Silver Mt. Zion Memorial Orchestra & Tra-La-La Band
- Released: March 7, 2005
- Recorded: Hotel2Tango
- Length: 58:12
- Label: Constellation
- Producer: Howard Bilerman

Thee Silver Mt. Zion Memorial Orchestra & Tra-La-La Band chronology
The "Pretty Little Lightning Paw" E.P. (2004)	Horses in the Sky (2005)	13 Blues for Thirteen Moons (2008)

Professional ratings
Review scores
Source	Rating
Allmusic	4.5/5 stars
Dusted	favorable
Pitchfork Media	7.1/10

Horses in the Sky is the fourth album by the Canadian post-rock band Silver Mt. Zion, this time under the alias Thee Silver Mt. Zion Memorial Orchestra & Tra-La-La Band. This is the first Silver Mt. Zion release to feature lyrics on every track (an aspect of the band distinguishing it from parent group Godspeed You! Black Emperor).

== Overview ==
On its record label page, the band describes the album as "6 busted 'waltzes' for world wars 4 thru 6" (sic), noting that "first song's about war and drug addiction, fourth song's about kanada, and the rest of it is all love songs" (sic). Track 5, the song "Hang on to Each Other" was recorded "next to a campfire by the river", "at Garfield's fire pit".

The album was released on vinyl on March 7, 2005 in Europe and March 21, 2005 in North America, and on CD on March 21, 2005 in Europe and April 4, 2005 in North America. On the fourth side of the double vinyl set, there are designs etched onto the surface of the record (credited to Nadia Moss in the liner notes).

== Track listing ==
All music and lyrics by Silver Mt. Zion.

No.	Title	Length
1.	"God Bless Our Dead Marines"	11:44
2.	"Mountains Made of Steam"	9:28
3.	"Horses in the Sky"	6:39
4.	"Teddy Roosevelt's Guns"	9:45
5.	"Hang on to Each Other"	6:38
6.	"Ring Them Bells (Freedom Has Come and Gone)"	13:58
Total length:		58:12

== Personnel ==
Thee Silver Mt. Zion Memorial Orchestra & Tra-La-La Band

- Thierry Amar – contrabass, glasses, harmonica, voice, mixing
- Beckie Foon – cello, voice, mixing
- Ian Ilavsky – guitar, harmonium, voice, mixing
- Scott Levine Gilmore – drums, percussion, guitar, mandolin, voice, mixing
- Efrim Menuck – guitar, piano, voice, mixing
- Jessica Moss – violin, piano, glasses, voice, mixing
- Sophie Trudeau – violin, trumpet, glasses, voice, mixing

Technical

- Howard Bilerman – mixing and recording
- J. F. Chicoine – mastering

Graphical

- Luc Paradis – drawings (dead marine, horse, bird)
- Nadia Moss – side 4 etching
- Silver Mt. Zion – other collages and scribblings
