= Snapshot of a Beginner =

Studio album by Nap Eyes
- Released: March 27, 2020
- Studio: Long Pond Studio
- Length: 45:35
- Label: Jagjaguwar
- Producers: Jonathan Low; James Elkington

Nap Eyes chronology
I'm Bad Now (2018)	Snapshot of a Beginner (2020)

Snapshot of a Beginner is the fourth studio album by Canadian indie rock band Nap Eyes. It was released on March 27, 2020, by Jagjaguwar.

== Critical reception ==
Professional ratings
Aggregate scores
Source	Rating
AnyDecentMusic?	7.4/10
Metacritic	76/100
Review scores
Source	Rating
AllMusic	3.5/5 stars
DIY	3.5/5 stars
Exclaim!	8/10
Paste	7.5/10
Pitchfork	7.5/10
The Skinny	4/5 stars
Under the Radar	8/10

Snapshot of a Beginner was met with generally favorable reviews from critics. At Metacritic, which assigns a weighted average rating out of 100 to reviews from mainstream publications, this release received an average score of 76, based on 10 reviews.

== Track listing ==
Snapshot of a Beginner track listing
No.	Title	Length
1.	"So Tired"	4:12
2.	"Primordial Soup"	3:37
3.	"Even Though I Can’t Read Your Mind"	3:28
4.	"Mark Zuckerberg"	2:45
5.	"Mystery Calling"	5:03
6.	"Fool Thinking Ways"	4:11
7.	"If You Were In Prison"	2:17
8.	"Real Thoughts"	7:44
9.	"Dark Link"	3:30
10.	"When I Struck Out On My Own"	3:57
11.	"Though I Wish I Could"	4:51

== Personnel ==
Adapted from Discogs

- Nigel Chapman - vocals
- Joshua Salter - bass guitar
- Seamus Dalton - drums
- Brad Loughead - guitar
- Jonathan Low - keyboard, producer
- James Elkington - piano, guitar, producer
