= Nap Eyes =

Canadian indie rock band

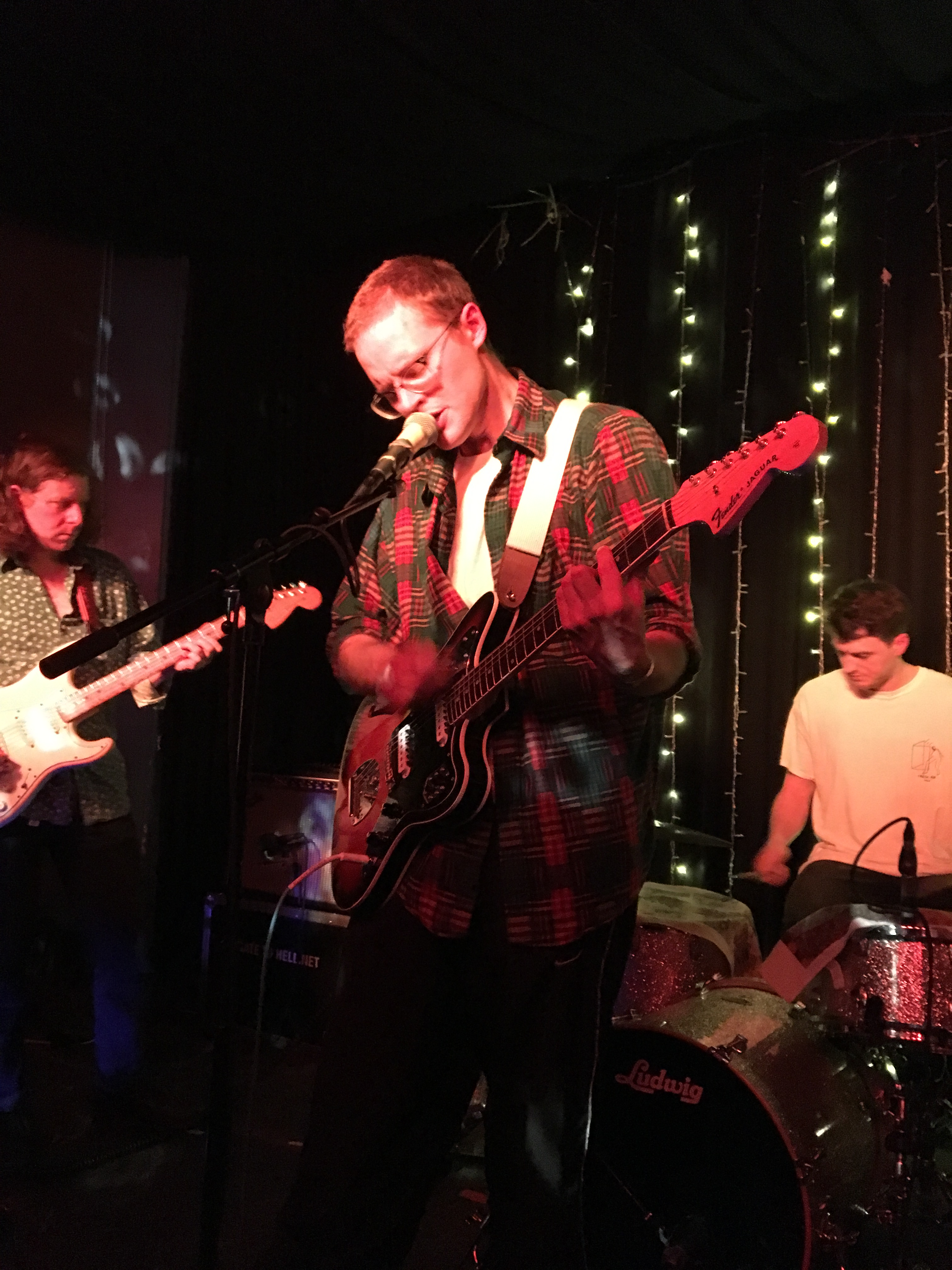
- Nap Eyes, Brighton UK, May 2018

Background information
- Origin: Halifax, Nova Scotia
- Genres: Indie rock
- Years active: 2011–present
- Labels: Jagjaguar, Paradise Of Bachelors, Royal Mountain, Youve Changed
- Members: Nigel Chapman; Brad Loughead; Josh Salter; Seamus Dalton

Nap Eyes is a Canadian indie rock band from Halifax, Nova Scotia. The band consists of vocalist Nigel Chapman, guitarist Brad Loughead, bassist Josh Salter, and drummer Seamus Dalton.

== History ==
Formed in 2011 when Salter and Dalton joined Chapman's existing solo project The Mighty Northumberland, the band released its debut album Whine of the Mystic independently in 2014. The album was rereleased in 2015 on You've Changed Records in Canada and Paradise of Bachelors in the United States.

The band's second album, Thought Rock Fish Scale, with songs delivered in a slow, psychedelic and meditative style, was released in 2016 on both labels. The album was supported by a concert tour of dates in both Canada and the United States, an appearance on CBC Radio's Q and a follow-up tour of select dates in Europe. In June 2016, the album was named to the longlist for the 2016 Polaris Music Prize.

Nap Eyes' third album, I'm Bad Now, was released in 2018. The songs showed the band's move to a more uptempo style. Their fourth album, Snapshot of a Beginner, was released on March 27, 2020, preceded by the single Mark Zuckerberg.

The band released their fifth album, The Neon Gate on October 18, 2024.

== Discography ==
- Whine of the Mystic (2014)
- Thought Rock Fish Scale (2016)
- I'm Bad Now (2018)
- Snapshot of a Beginner (2020)
- The Neon Gate (2024)
