= Hang On to Each Other =

EP by Thee Silver Mt. Zion Memorial Orchestra
- Released: April 29, 2014
- Length: 23:16
- Label: Constellation CST105

Thee Silver Mt. Zion Memorial Orchestra chronology
Fuck Off Get Free We Pour Light on Everything (2014)	Hang On to Each Other (2014)

Professional ratings
Review scores
Source	Rating
Consequence of Sound	C+
Pitchfork Media	6.4/10

Hang On to Each Other is the third EP by Thee Silver Mt. Zion Memorial Orchestra. The EP was released on April 29, 2014, on Constellation.

The EP contains two electronic/dance remixes of "Hang On to Each Other" from Horses in the Sky and features vocals by Ariel Engle of AroarA.

== Track listing ==
No.	Title	Length
1.	"Any Fucking Thing You Love"	11:05
2.	"Birds Toss Precious Flowers"	12:11
