= Automatic Vaudeville Studios =

Canadian underground movie collective

Automatic Vaudeville Studios (AVS) is an underground movie collective based out of Montreal.

AVS was founded in 1998 by Mark Slutsky, Daniel Perlmutter, and Seth W. Owen. They modeled the collective on "golden age" Hollywood's movie studios, AVS has produced close to 100 shorts using local artists, musicians, actors and other unpaid talent to bring their no-budget genre-inspired entertainments to life. "The lower budget you have, the more control you have over the picture," collective member Slutsky said in a 2005 newspaper interview. "It means you have to use your head."

Some of Automatic Vaudeville's productions include The Recommendations (2005), a comedy about jealousy and revenge in the literary demi-monde; Spanked: The Ron Friendly Story, about the tumultuous life and times of a fictional performance artist; Young Cons, and the series known as the Schandcycle, which features improvised music performed by Montreal music collective Schandkollektief.

A selection of Automatic Vaudeville's work can be found on their limited-run DVD releases, Your Hi-Class DVD, Vol. 1 and Your Hi-Class DVD, Vol. 2.

== Selected filmography ==
- Bluebeard
- He Killed for Love
- The Southside Five
- Young Cons
- The Sophisticated Detectives (2001)
- Spanked: The Ron Friendly Story (2002)
- The Successor (2002)
- Krangor: Legend of the Galaxy (2003)
- Here’s Looking At Us Chapter One: The First 5 Years: Automatic Vaudeville 1998-2003: Our Story (2003)
- Schandfilm (2004)
- The Recommendations (2005)
- Peepers (2008)
