= Howard Bilerman =

Canadian recording engineer

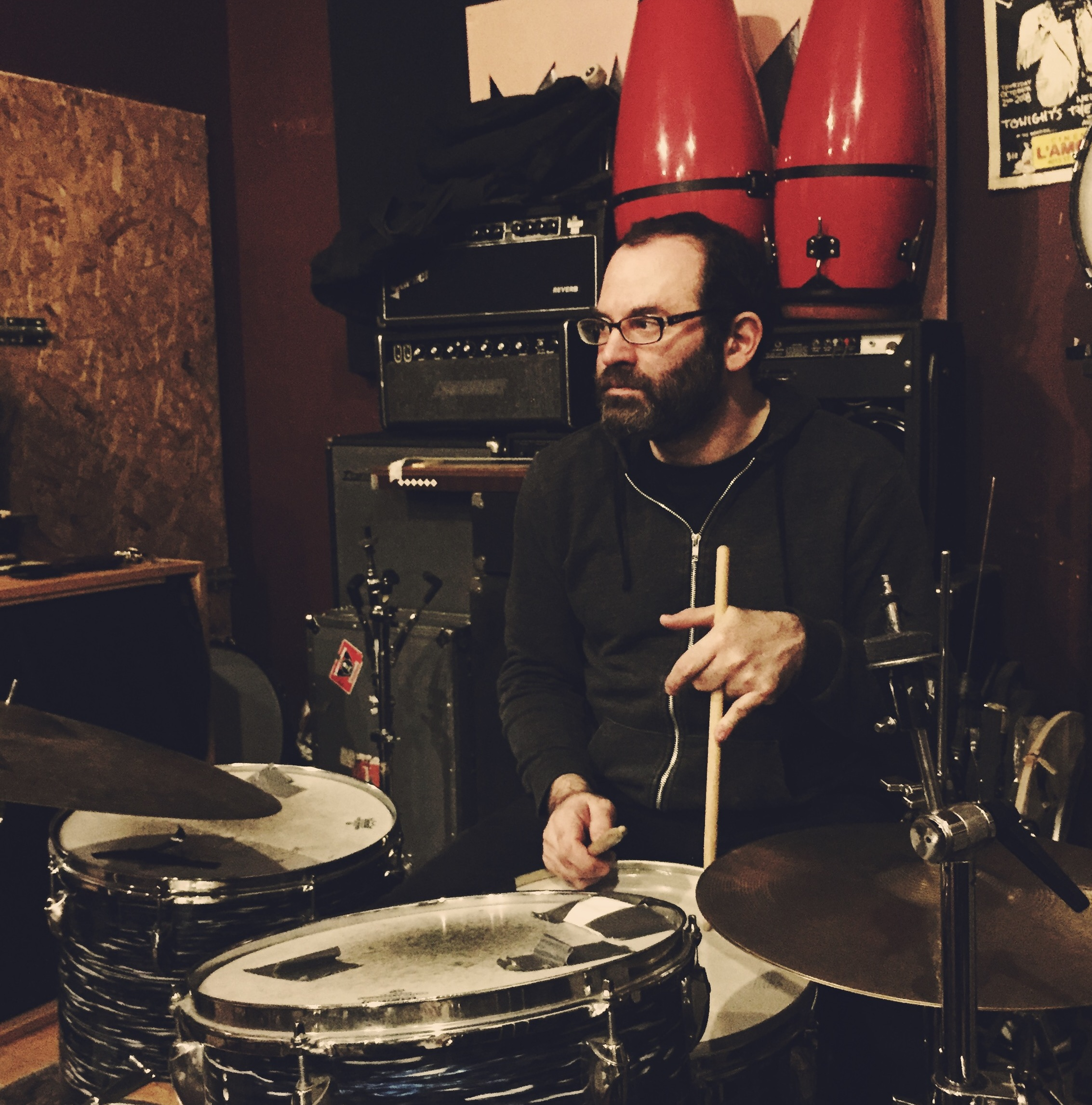

Background information
- Born: September 25, 1970 (age 56)
- Origin: Montreal, Quebec, Canada
- Genres: Punk rock; indie rock; avant-garde
- Occupations: Musician; record producer
- Instruments: Drums; percussion; guitar
- Website: www.howardbilerman.com

Howard Bilerman (born September 25, 1970) is a Canadian musician, sound engineer, and record producer based in Montreal, Quebec. He co-owns the hotel2tango recording studio, and played drums for the band Arcade Fire.

Across his recording career, Bilerman has worked on albums by several prominent Canadian artists, including Godspeed You! Black Emperor, Wolf Parade, Leonard Cohen, Bell Orchestre, U.S. Girls and The Weather Station.

== Early life and education ==
Bilerman grew up in Montreal where he attended St. George's School of Montreal. He earned a bachelor's degree in communication studies from Concordia University in 1994.

== Career ==
Beginning in 1996, Bilerman started a studio called Mom & Pop Sounds, first in his parents' basement, then in a loft in Old Montreal. In addition to his own material under the name EAVESDROPPER, he recorded tracks for local bands such as The Paper Route, Bionic, UVBC, The Spaceshits, Tricky Woo, and Goldfish.

As of 2000, Bilerman runs the hotel2tango recording studio in Montreal along with Efrim Menuck and Thierry Amar of Godspeed You! Black Emperor and A Silver Mt. Zion, and Radwan Moumneh.

Bilerman was the drummer for the band Arcade Fire between 2003 and 2004; he recorded and drummed on their debut album, Funeral as well as acting as sound engineer. He has also drummed on songs by Thee Silver Mt. Zion Memorial Orchestra & Tra-La-La Band, Vic Chesnutt, Basia Bulat, Titus Andronicus (band), Sons of an Illustrious Father, Lilah Larson, Peter Peter, Rich Aucoin, Broken Social Scene, and Angela Desveaux.

As a recording engineer or producer, Bilerman has a credit on over 500 records, including those by Handsome Furs, Wolf Parade, Titus Andronicus (band), Coeur de Pirate, Lou Doillon, Perfect Pussy, Charlotte Cornfield, British Sea Power, Tricky Woo, Thee Silver Mt. Zion Memorial Orchestra & Tra-La-La Band, Thalia Zedek, CPC Gangbangs, Arcade Fire, U.S. Girls, Godspeed You! Black Emperor, Grant Hart, Bassekou Kouyate, Vic Chesnutt, The Wooden Sky, The Weather Station, The Barr Brothers, Basia Bulat, Leif Vollebekk, Sarah Davachi, Bell Orchestre, Sons of an Illustrious Father, Dan Boeckner's band Operators, and Halifax's Nap Eyes.

In 2012, Bilerman travelled to Mali to record an album by ngoni player Bassekou Kouyate, despite political unrest in the country at the time.

Bilerman is a frequent host of Pop Montreal public lectures, where he interviews fellow producers and musicians. Those include Bob Johnston, John Simon, Andrew Loog Oldham, Steve Albini, Brian Paulson, Guy Picciotto, Peter Jesperson, and Rough Trade Records founder Geoff Travis. He has also been a frequent instructor at Banff Centre in Alberta.

In 2016, Bilerman was one of the engineers on Leonard Cohen's Grammy award winning song "You Want It Darker".

In 2025, Bilerman was the recording engineer for two tracks off Argentine experimental musician Juana Molina's album Doga, "Caravanas" and "Va rara", which she recorded at the Hotel2Tango studio in Montreal.

In 2026 Bilerman opened a temporary Funkhaus recording studio at the PEOPLE Festival in Berlin to allow participants to record new material written at the event. It was there that Leonard Cohen’s grandson Cassius Cohen was recorded for the first time..

== Production discography ==
Year	Title	Artist	Credits#
2001	Born into Trouble as the Sparks Fly Upward	Silver Mt. Zion	Production
2002	Yanqui U.X.O.	Godspeed You! Black Emperor	Mixing
2003	"This Is Our Punk-Rock," Thee Rusted Satellites Gather + Sing,	Silver Mt. Zion	Production, mixing
2004	Funeral	Arcade Fire	Engineer, recording, drums, guitar
2005	Horses in the Sky	Silver Mt. Zion	Mixing, recording
2010	Kollaps Tradixionales	Silver Mt. Zion	Production
2016	You Want It Darker	Leonard Cohen	Engineer
2019	Thanks for the Dance	Leonard Cohen	Engineer, assistant engineer
2020	U.S. Girls	U.S. Girls	Engineer, recording, percussion
2021	Detritus	Sarah Neufeld	Engineer
2021	Highs in the Minuses	Charlotte Cornfield	Engineer, noise
