= Sarah Davachi =

Canadian musician

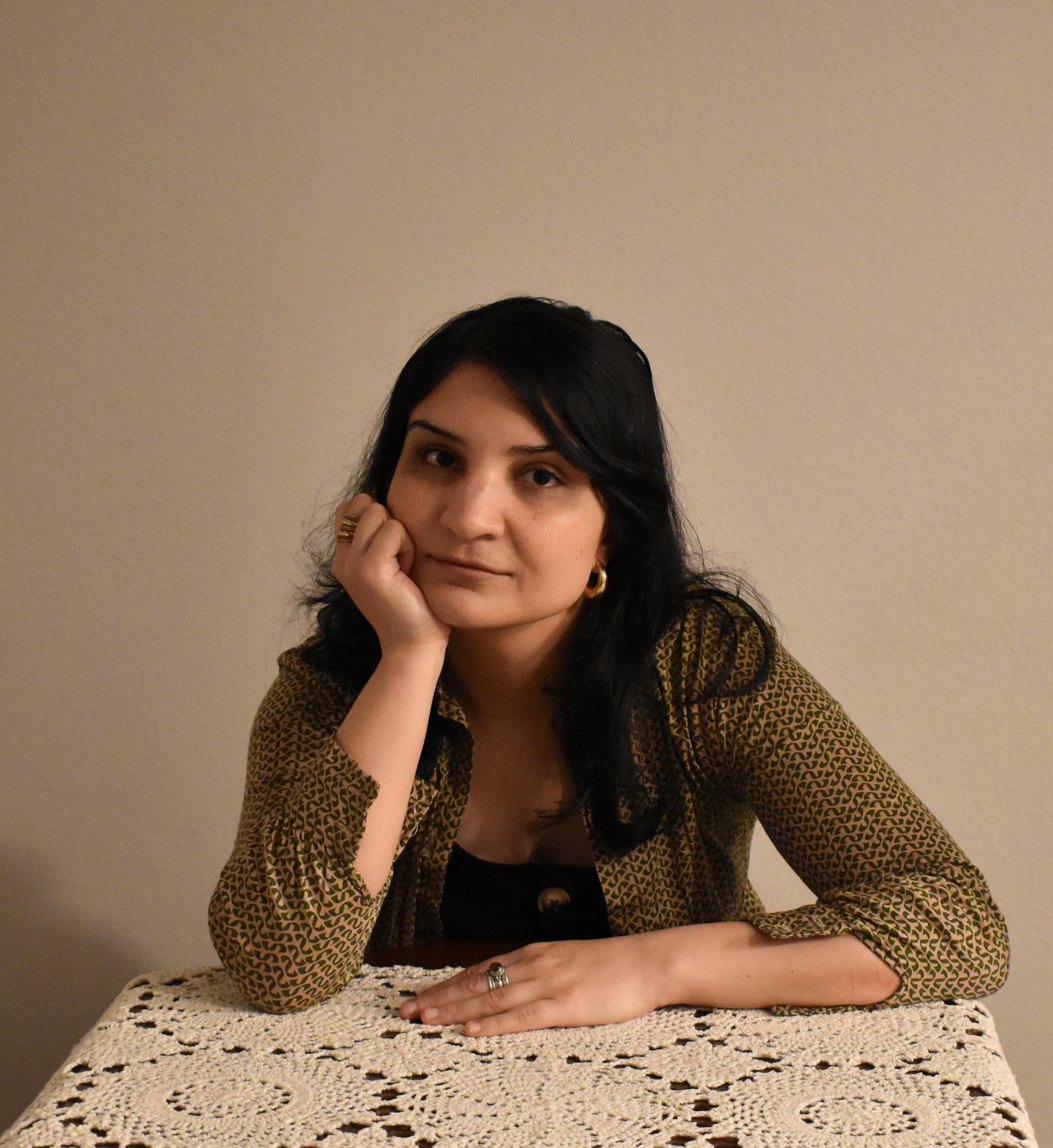
- Sarah Davachi, 2022

Background information
- Born: 1987 (age 38–39); Calgary, Alberta, Canada
- Genres: Drone; minimalism; electroacoustic; modern classical
- Occupations: Composer; performer
- Instruments: Organs; synthesizers; piano; electronics; keyboards
- Years active: 2013–present
- Labels: Late Music; Superior Viaduct; Ba Da Bing; Recital; Students of Decay; Important; JAZ; Another Timbre; Boomkat Editions
- Website: sarahdavachi.com

Sarah Davachi (born 1987) is a Canadian composer and performer of electroacoustic and minimalist music. She is a pianist and an organist.

She is a graduate of the University of Calgary and holds a master's degree in electronic music and recording media from Mills College in Oakland, California. She has resided in Vancouver, British Columbia and Montreal, Quebec before relocating to Los Angeles, California in 2017 to pursue a PhD in Musicology at UCLA.

Davachi's music has been issued by numerous labels including Late Music, Superior Viaduct, Ba Da Bing, Recital, and Important Records.

== Career ==
Sarah Davachi is a composer and performer whose work is concerned with the close intricacies of timbral and temporal space, utilizing extended durations and considered harmonic structures that emphasize gradual variations in texture, overtone complexity, psychoacoustic phenomena, and tuning and intonation. Her compositions span solo, chamber ensemble, and acousmatic formats, incorporating a wide range of acoustic and electronic instrumentation. She is similarly informed by minimalist and longform tenets, early music concepts of form, affect, and intervallic harmony, as well as experimental production practices of the electroacoustic studio environment.

Davachi's compositional practice combines an interest in electronic instrumentation with contemporary treatment of orchestral acoustic instruments. She is also described as a drone artist. "Part of her success", wrote Resident Advisor, "comes from her musicality: she approaches drone with a fetching, but never facile, sense of melody." According to The Stranger, "Currently, Davachi is the closest thing we have to a hybrid of Éliane Radigue and Terry Riley." According to the Getty Museum, where she was invited to create experiential soundtracks to Robert Irwin's Central Garden, "Davachi is among the preeminent emerging composers and performers of electroacoustic music."

Her first full-length LP release, Barons Court, was released in 2015. The album presented an unusual combination of sonic synthesis and live performance, featuring vintage synthesizers, cello, viola and other instruments, aiming for a novel approach to beat frequencies and drones. "Though she doesn't dumb it down," wrote Resident Advisor, "this was experimental ambient music that almost anyone could enjoy." Her album Vergers was released in 2016 by Important Records, featuring only one electronic instrument (an EMS Synthi 100 synthesizer), plus violin and Davachi's voice. In 2016 Davachi also released the album Dominions.

All My Circles Run, a suite of studies for solo acoustic instruments, was released in early 2017 by Students of Decay. "Like Brian Eno at his solo best," Pitchfork wrote, "it's the sort of ambience that doesn't flood, that hovers precariously somewhere between the conscious and the unconscious, barely-there and indisputably present." The music on her 2018 album Let Night Come On Bells End the Day, was described by the Chicago Reader as "meditative" and "hypnotic."

Gave in Rest was issued in mid-2018. It was described by Tiny Mix Tapes as "cathedral-sized meditations," recorded away from Vancouver during a trip through European churches and lapidariums. The album's first single, "Evensong", was released in July 2018. Jon Pareles of The New York Times described "Evensong" as "an arc of mourning and mysticism, a patient crescendo dissolving into a haunted memory". "Since 2013," wrote Noisey, "she's made music that tends toward slow-moving melodic gestures out of both synthetic and recorded instruments, often treated and edited with electroacoustic processes that emphasize their own stillness, but this new record is the first where she's been able to explicitly engage with these feelings." In 2019, Davachi released the album Pale Bloom, an acoustic suite of pieces for piano, reed organ, Hammond B3, violin, and viola da gamba recorded at Fantasy Studios in Berkeley, California.

In 2020 Davachi founded Late Music, an imprint within the partner labels division of Warp Records. In June 2020 Davachi published a collection of essays, titled Papers. Her album Cantus, Descant, released in September 2020 via Late Music, was recorded on six pipe organs across North America and Europe. Davachi also released a number of EPs in 2020 and the double live album, Figures in Open Air. The album Antiphonals, recorded mostly using the Mellotron and Korg CX-3 electric organ, followed in 2021. In 2022, Davachi released the double album Two Sisters, featuring chamber music written for carillon, choir, organ, strings, woodwinds, brass, and electronics. She also released the double live album In Concert & in Residence. In 2024, Davachi released Long Gradus, a triple album of solo pipe organ works recorded at historic churches in California and the Netherlands over a three-year period. The album explores sustained tone, decay, and resonance, and was described by Boomkat as “monastic,” “starkly beautiful,” and “a masterclass in quietude.”

Davachi also works as a musicologist, exploring organology, phenomenology, and timbre. Between 2007 and 2017, Davachi worked at Calgary's National Music Centre as an interpreter, content developer, and archivist. She has also lectured at Simon Fraser University, Vancouver Film School, UCLA, California Institute of the Arts, and held artist residencies at the Banff Centre for the Arts (Banff, Canada), Quatuor Bozzini's Composer's Kitchen, Swiss Museum & Center for Electronic Music Instruments (Fribourg, Switzerland), the National Music Centre (Calgary, Canada), STEIM (Amsterdam, Netherlands), WORM (Rotterdam, Netherlands), Elektronmusikstudion (Stockholm, Sweden), OBORO (Montréal, Canada), and MESS (Melbourne, Australia).

Davachi completed her ethnomusicological dissertation in 2026 titled From the Ruins of the Literal: Critical Organology, Timbre, and the Poetics of Affect. It was subsequently released as a book by Late Music.

Since 2017, she has been a resident host on NTS with the monthly show Le Jardin.

== Discography ==
Adapted from Davachi's website.

=== Full-Length Albums ===
Title	Notes
Barons Court	Released: February 2015; Label: Students of Decay; Format: LP
Dominions	Released: April 2016; Label: JAZ Records; Format: LP
Vergers	Released: November 2016; Label: Important Records; Format: LP
All My Circles Run	Released: March 2017; Label: Students of Decay; Format: LP
Let Night Come On Bells End The Day	Released: April 2018; Label: Recital; Format: LP
Gave in Rest	Released: September 2018; Label: Ba Da Bing; Format: LP
Pale Bloom	Released: June 2019; Label: Superior Viaduct / W25TH; Format: LP
Cantus, Descant	Released: September 2020; Label: Late Music; Format: 2×LP
Antiphonals	Released: September 2021; Label: Late Music; Format: LP
Two Sisters	Released: September 2022; Label: Late Music; Format: 2×LP
Long Gradus	Released: November 2023; Label: Late Music; Format: 2×LP
The Head as Form'd in the Crier's Choir	Released: September 2024; Label: Late Music; Format: 2×LP
The Will of Tongues	Released: August 2026; Label: Late Music; Format: 3×LP

=== Live Albums and Commissioned Works ===
Title	Notes
Figures in Open Air	Released: November 2020; Label: Late Music; Format: 2×CD
In Concert & In Residence	Released: November 2022; Label: Late Music; Format: 2×CD
Music For A Bellowing Room (with Dicky Bahto)	Released: November 2024; Label: Late Music; Format: Blu-ray + 3×CD

=== EPs ===
Title	Notes
The Untuning of the Sky	Released: June 2013; Label: Full Spectrum; Format: cassette
August Harp	Released: April 2014; Label: Important Records; Format: cassette
Altstadt / Neustadt	Released: February 2015; Label: Students of Decay; Format: cassette
Qualities of Bodies Permanent	Released: April 2015; Label: Constellation Tatsu; Format: cassette
Untitled	Released: September 2017; Label: Aventures; Format: cassette
For Harpsichord / For Pipe Organ and String Trio	Released: December 2017; Label: Boomkat Editions; Format: CD
Horae	Released: March 2020; Label: self-released; Format: digital
Five Cadences	Released: May 2020; Label: self-released; Format: digital
Gathers	Released: May 2020; Label: Boomkat Editions; Format: cassette
Laurus	Released: December 2020; Label: Late Music; Format: cassette

=== Collaborations ===
Title	Notes
Intemporel (with Ariel Kalma)	Released: May 2019; Label: Black Sweat Records; Format: LP
Mother of Pearl (with Sean McCann)	Released: November 2021; Label: Recital; Format: LP
Slow Poem for Stiebler (with Biliana Voutchkova)	Released: February 2023; Label: Another Timbre; Format: CD

=== Film scores ===
Title	Notes
Feeler	short by Paul Clipson; United States; Released: 2016
At Hand	short by Paul Clipson; United States; Released: 2017
Terra Femme	documentary feature score; United States; Released: 2020
The Grief Interval	documentary short original score; United Kingdom; Released: 2021
Topology of Sirens	feature film soundtrack; United States; Released: 2021
A Woman Escapes	feature film original score; Canada, France, Turkey; Released: 2022
Sky Peals	feature film original score; United Kingdom; Released: 2023
