= Thee Silver Mt. Zion Memorial Orchestra =

Canadian band

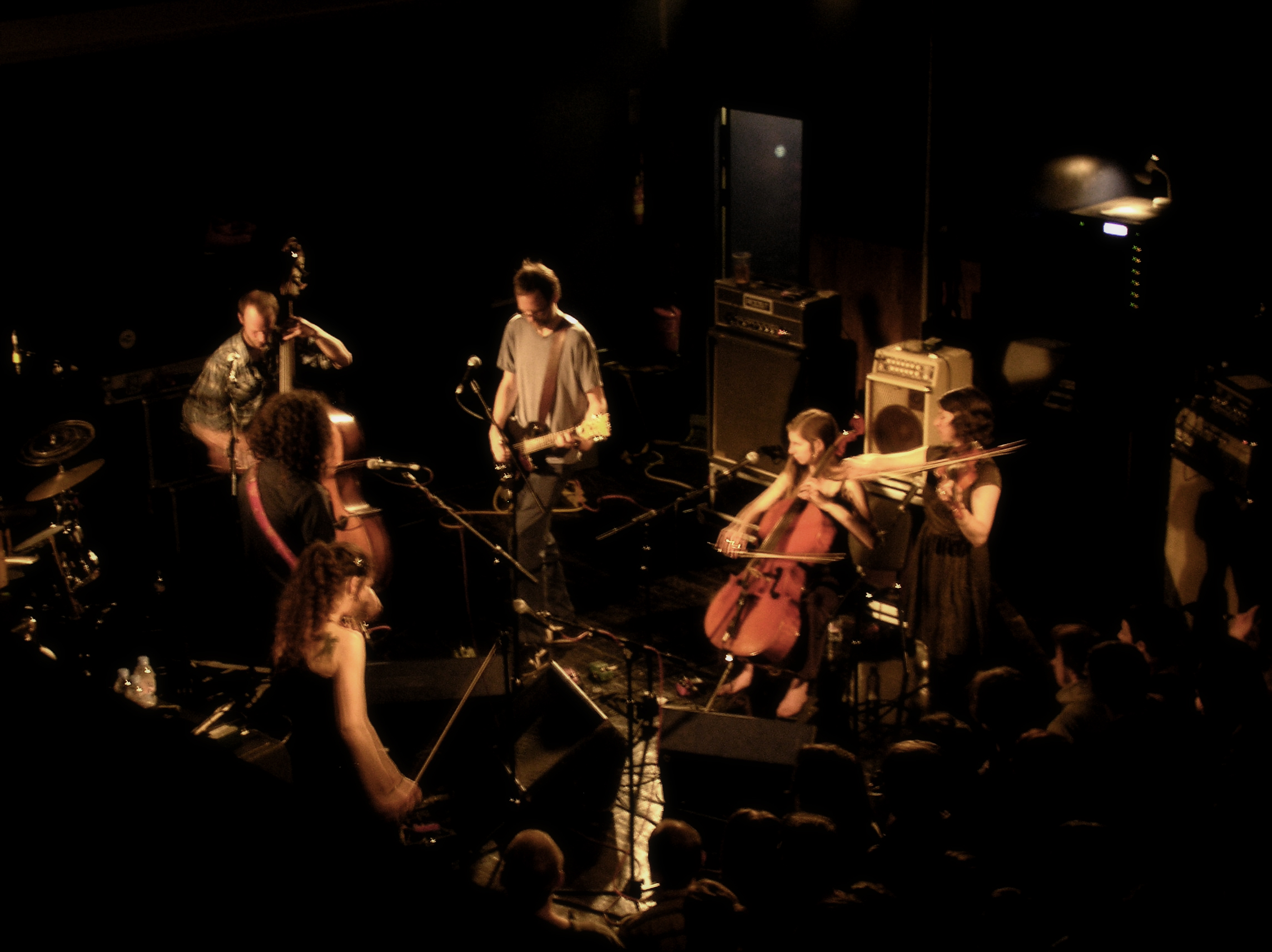
- Thee Silver Mt. Zion Memorial Orchestra and Tra-La-La Band in April 2007

Background information
- Also known as: A Silver Mt. Zion; The Silver Mt. Zion Memorial Orchestra and Tra-La-La Band; The Silver Mt. Zion Memorial Orchestra and Tra-La-La Band with Choir; Thee Silver Mountain Reveries; Thee Silver Mt. Zion Memorial Orchestra and Tra-La-La Band
- Origin: Montreal, Quebec, Canada
- Genre: Post-rock
- Years active: 1999–2014
- Label: Constellation
- Members: David Payant; Efrim Menuck; Jessica Moss; Sophie Trudeau; Thierry Amar
- Past members: Beckie Foon; Eric Craven; Ian Ilavsky; Scott Levine Gilmore

Thee Silver Mt. Zion Memorial Orchestra (Note: The band has released material under various names: A Silver Mt. Zion, The Silver Mt. Zion Memorial Orchestra & Tra-La-La Band, The Silver Mt. Zion Memorial Orchestra and Tra-La-La Band with Choir, Thee Silver Mt. Zion Memorial Orchestra & Tra-La-La Band, and Thee Silver Mountain Reveries.), also known simply as Silver Mt. Zion, and abbreviated to SMZ, are a Canadian post-rock band that formed in 1999, originating from Montreal, Quebec. The group was founded by Godspeed You! Black Emperor co-founder Efrim Menuck, who was joined by fellow Godspeed members Sophie Trudeau and Thierry Amar. Aside from these core members, Silver Mt. Zion has undergone almost yearly personnel changes, evolving by stages from a mostly instrumental trio at the time of its first recordings into an eight-piece group, and then in 2008 into a strongly vocal quintet.

Silver Mt. Zion's music has been described as post-rock, though singer and guitarist Efrim Menuck identifies with the punk rock movement and aesthetic. The band has released seven studio albums and three EPs, on the record label Constellation.

== History ==
=== Origins (1999–2000) ===
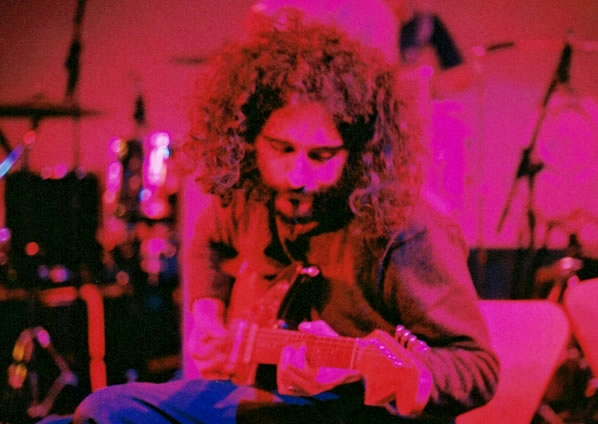
Efrim Menuck playing with Godspeed You! Black Emperor in November 2000.

Silver Mt. Zion began as a framework for Efrim Menuck, a guitarist in Montreal-based post-rock band Godspeed You! Black Emperor, to develop his knowledge of music theory and music scoring, and to work on musical ideas that didn't fit into the format of his band. Menuck enlisted violinist Sophie Trudeau and bassist Thierry Amar, who were also involved with Godspeed You! Black Emperor. The band made its live debut on March 6, 1999, at Musique Fragile, a performance venue organized by the record label Constellation. It released its debut album, He Has Left Us Alone but Shafts of Light Sometimes Grace the Corner of Our Rooms..., on March 27, 2000.

Godspeed You! Black Emperor rarely features vocals, relying instead on audio samples; similarly themed samples appear on Silver Mt. Zion's debut album. Menuck does sing on two tracks, "Movie (Never Made)" and "Blown-out Joy from Heaven's Mercied Hole".

=== Expanding membership (2000–2004) ===
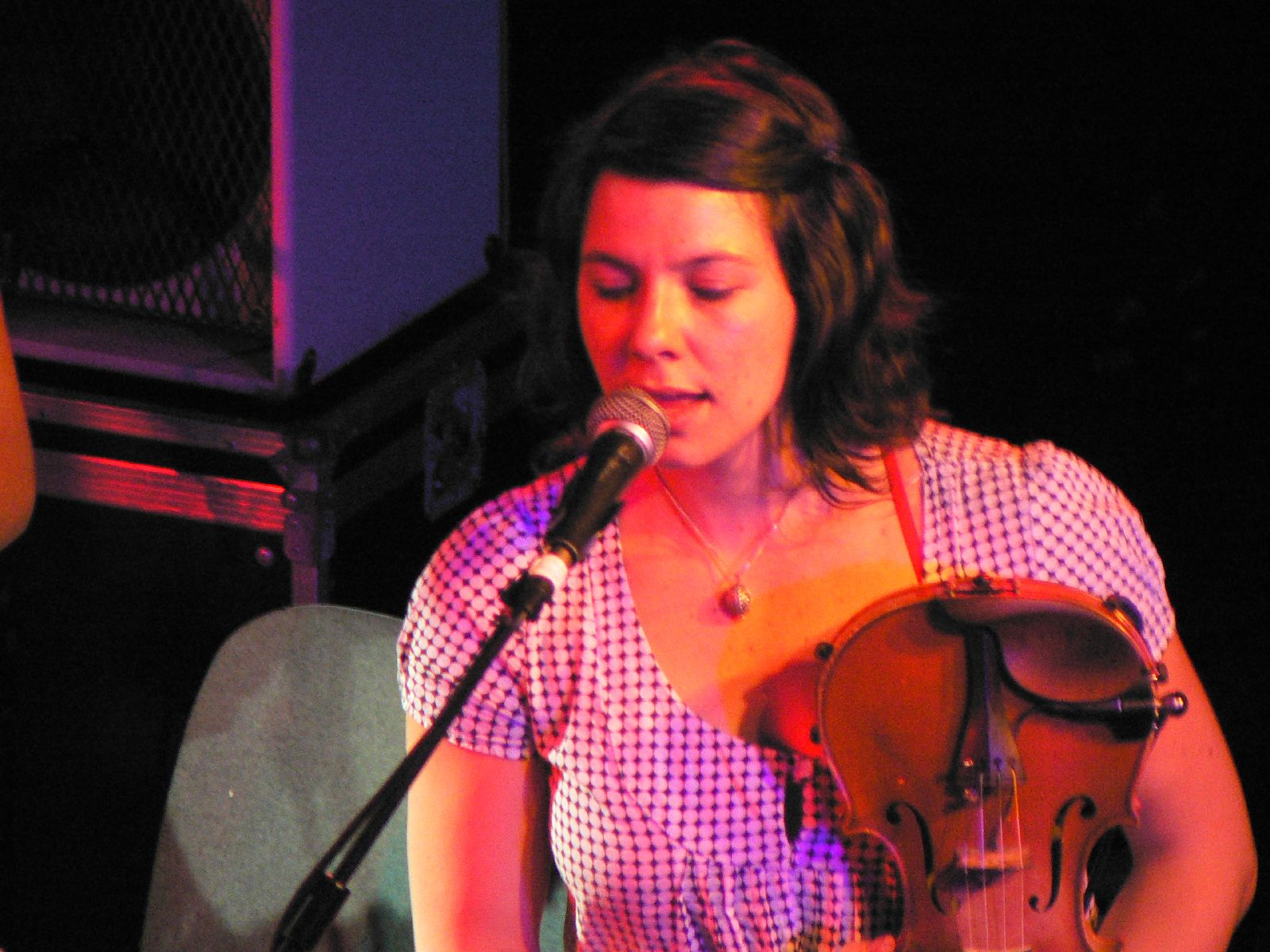
Sophie Trudeau

Before the release of its second album, the band recruited three more musicians, expanding the group to a sextet. The new members were cellist Beckie Foon, guitarist Ian Ilavsky, and violinist Jessica Moss. The band's name was changed to The Silver Mt. Zion Memorial Orchestra & Tra-La-La Band to reflect the larger membership.

In early 2001, the band set out on an extensive tour of Europe. During their 5-hour flight to Europe, the band members wrote "The triumph of our tired eyes". Soon after their return, the album Born Into Trouble as the Sparks Fly Upwards was written.

While some tracks on Born into Trouble […] reflect the building but repetitive and instrumental nature of the first album, some tracks are more song like in structure and rely more on vocals. On "Take These Hands and Throw Them in the River", the vocal parts finish with a building wall of noise dynamic, while "Could've Moved Mountains" has double-tracked vocals the listener has to strain to hear.

With the same lineup, but with the band's name slightly expanded to reflect the change in sound and membership, The Silver Mt. Zion Memorial Orchestra & Tra-La-La Band with Choir released "This Is Our Punk-Rock," Thee Rusted Satellites Gather + Sing in 2003. The album featured four tracks each over ten minutes and had more singing as well as greater emphasis on drums in two of the tracks. Thee Rusted Satellite Choir features 24 names. The album appeared on the !earshot National Top 50 Chart in September 2003.

After a break due to Godspeed You! Black Emperor activities, the band set out on a brief Canadian tour at end of January 2004; it then travelled to Europe, where it toured from mid-February to the end of March. That winter Scott Levine Gilmore from Black ox orkestar joined the band and it began performing in a semi-circle onstage. After performing at the All Tomorrow's Parties festival, the band headed across the Atlantic again in December for a tour of the UK.

The lineup was expanded again to include Gilmore, a mandolinist and guitarist. The choir dropped, and the band added an E to the first word of its name, becoming Thee Silver Mt. Zion Memorial Orchestra & Tra-La-La Band for the release of its fourth full-length record. Horses in the Sky (2005) has six tracks, all with vocals. Following a short tour of eastern Canada in August that year, the band performed for the first time in the United States in Brooklyn, New York City. Plans for a longer tour were cut short after Trudeau, one of two violinists in the band, broke her collarbone. In that time, Gilmore left the band and was replaced by former Hangedup drummer Eric Craven.

=== 13 Blues for Thirteen Moons (2006–2008) ===
In 2006, the band headed to Europe at the end of April and played shows until the start of June. A tour of Canada and the United States (Silver Mt. Zion's first) ran from late July to the end of August. The tour debuted two new songs, "BlindBlindBlind" and "1,000,000 Died to Make This Sound". In a follow-up 2007 tour of Europe, the band premiered two new songs, "Engine Broke Blues" and the title song of its album, which was released in March 2008 and contains all four tracks. The album also contains 12 short tracks of drone and feedback which feed into each other to create a fifth piece on the album, acting as a prologue to the album proper, which appropriately begins on track 13.

Silver Mt. Zion then toured Europe and North America, premiering two new songs, "I Built Myself a Metal Bird, I Fed My Metal Bird the Wings of Other Metal Birds" and "There's a Light". In the summer of 2008, the band's lineup changed again as Craven, Foon and Ian Ilavsky resigned. After they left, the band lost the words "tra-la-la band" from its name. At that time David Payant joined as drummer and the band officially renamed itself Thee Silver Mt. Zion Memorial Orchestra. In September that year the new lineup played at the New York ATP Festival.

=== Vic Chesnutt collaboration and Kollaps Tradixionales (2009–2010) ===
The members of Thee Silver Mt. Zion contributed to two works by Vic Chesnutt: the 2007 album North Star Deserter and the 2009 album At the Cut. Both were released by Constellation Records. In the spring of 2009, the band began working on recording material for its album Kollaps Tradixionales, released in February 2010. The album contained the two new songs from the previous tour, some songs written when it was "tra-la-la band", and some new compositions. The band began a tour of the UK and Europe in March 2010, beginning with a positively reviewed sold-out show in Bristol. It performed at the ATP I'll Be Your Mirror festival in October 2011 in Asbury Park, New Jersey. The setlist included a new composition, "What We Loved was Not Enough".

=== Fuck Off Get Free We Pour Light on Everything (2014 and hiatus) ===
A new album, Fuck Off Get Free We Pour Light on Everything, was released in January 2014. It was shorter than most of the previous ones and recorded at Valcourt Studio.

In an interview with Vish Khanna on his Kreative Kontrol podcast, Menuck reported plans to release a Record Store Day 12" and an EP later in the year, both of which the band had just finished recording. In another interview, this time with the Paper Crane Podcast, member Jessica Moss revealed that a reformation was set to take place in March of 2020 after the band's hiatus, but was offset due to the COVID-19 pandemic. The future of the band is currently unknown.

== Style ==
=== Music, lyrics and themes ===
While Menuck writes most of the words sung or spoken in the band's pieces, other band members also contribute. There are strong political motifs in the band's music, covering a variety of subjects from anarchy to war and freedom. 13 Blues for Thirteen Moons, released in March 2008, was the first album to contain lyric sheets in its insert. Menuck's strident guitar work combines with strings, tape loops, and heavy drums to give the band its sound.

== Presentation ==
=== Names ===
The band's original name, A Silver Mt. Zion, rather than a reference to the Mount Zion in Jerusalem, developed from a misheard song lyric. Menuck himself is Jewish, and motifs relating to Judaism are occasionally present in the band's music (he described the band's recording of their first album as a "Jewish experience").

All of the band's names have revolved around the words "Silver Mt. Zion", except "Thee Silver Mountain Reveries" for the 2004 EP.

=== Imagery and packaging ===
As with most Constellation releases, Silver Mt. Zion records come in recycled cardboard cases with detailed artwork, do not feature the band's name on the album cover (the band's name at any particular time can be found on the spine of each album) and no copyright details on the disc. 13 Blues for Thirteen Moons was the first album case to feature a photo of the band inside (along with the lyric sheets).

Birds tend to feature heavily in the artwork, often in detailed pictures. Album artwork has also included a sketch of a horse, a mountainscape from the back of a packet of cigarettes and a picture of Nina Simone (in relation to the song "God Bless Our Dead Marines").

=== Band dynamics ===
Menuck is often identified as the band's frontman and leader, even though he has repeatedly stated that this is not the case. Though Menuck's voice and lyrics are often prominent on the records, everyone in the band sings on stage, contributing to the harmonies while standing in a semicircle, with members facing each other as often as the audience.

The band's dynamic has gone through changes with additions and replacements in the line-up. Trudeau's breaking her collarbone in a motorbike accident prevented them from touring, leading the band to spend time working more singing into their pieces. Drummer Scott Levine Gilmore's replacement, Eric Craven, contributed a louder and more lively feel; Craven was subsequently replaced by drummer David Payant.

Menuck, speaking for the band in interview, has said "[they all] believe in music as labour".

== Members ==
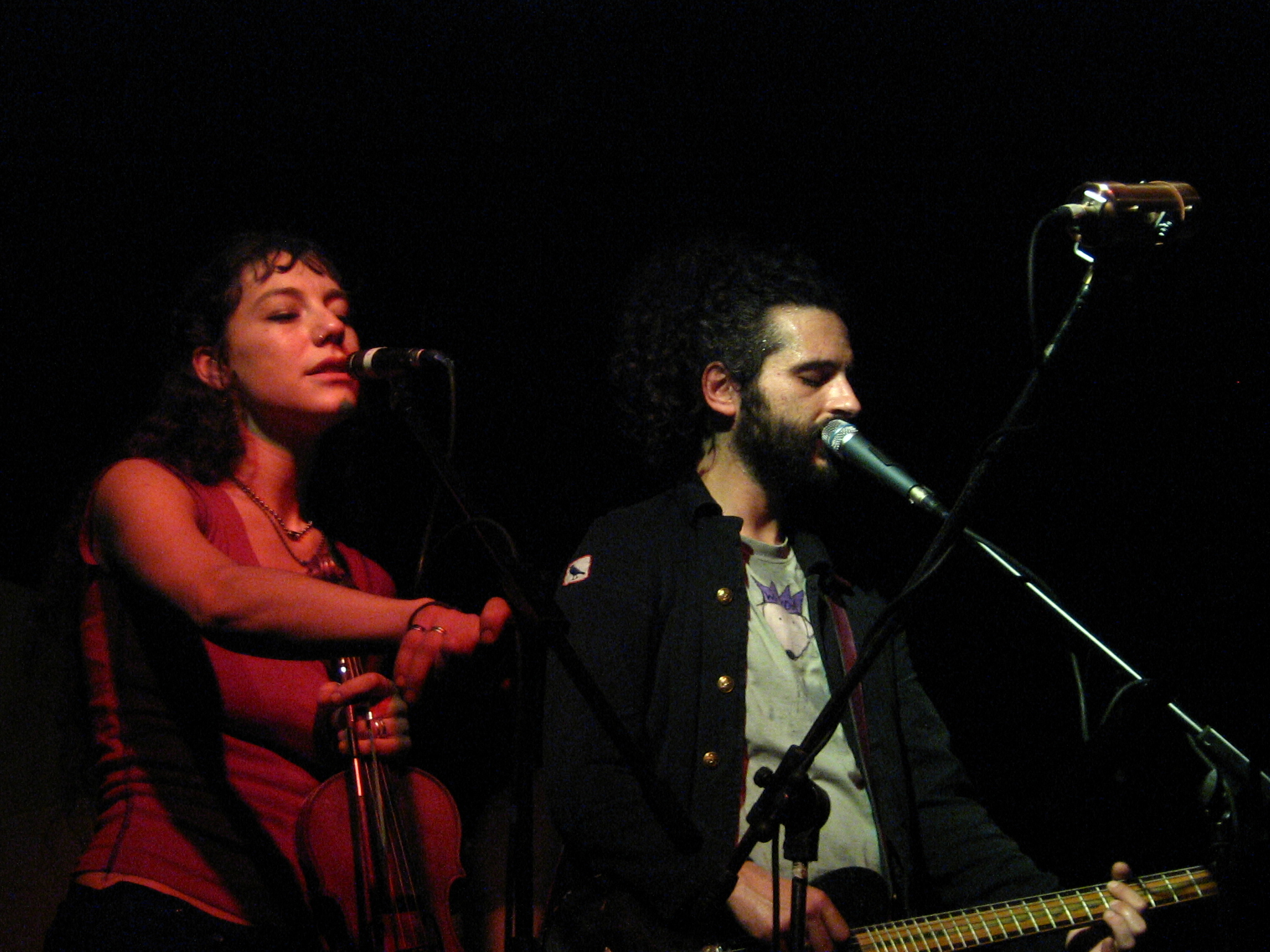
Members in Bologna

- Efrim Menuck – guitar, piano, vocals, sound effects
- Sophie Trudeau – violin, vocals
- Thierry Amar – double bass, bass guitar, vocals
- David Payant – drums, percussion, organ, vocals
- Jessica Moss – violin, vocals
- Ian Ilavsky – guitar, organ, harmonium, vocals
- Beckie Foon – cello, vocals
- Eric Craven – drums, percussion
- Scott Levine Gilmore – drums, percussion, guitar, mandolin, vocals

== Discography ==
=== LPs ===
A Silver Mt. Zion

- He Has Left Us Alone but Shafts of Light Sometimes Grace the Corner of Our Rooms... (2000)

The Silver Mt. Zion Memorial Orchestra & Tra-La-La Band

- Born into Trouble as the Sparks Fly Upward (2001)

The Silver Mt. Zion Memorial Orchestra & Tra-La-La Band with Choir

- "This Is Our Punk-Rock," Thee Rusted Satellites Gather + Sing, (2003)

Thee Silver Mt. Zion Memorial Orchestra & Tra-La-La Band

- Horses in the Sky (2005)
- 13 Blues for Thirteen Moons (2008)

Thee Silver Mt. Zion Memorial Orchestra

- Kollaps Tradixionales (2010)
- Fuck Off Get Free We Pour Light on Everything (2014)

=== EPs ===
Thee Silver Mountain Reveries

- The "Pretty Little Lightning Paw" E.P. (2004)

Thee Silver Mt. Zion Memorial Orchestra

- "The West Will Rise Again" (2012)
- Hang On to Each Other (2014)

=== Compilations ===
- Song of the Silent Land (Constellation Records compilation) (2004)
  - One original track as Silver Mt. Zion: "Iron Bridge to Thunder Bay"

== See also ==
- List of bands from Canada
- List of Quebec musicians
- Music of Quebec
