= Efrim Menuck =

Canadian musician

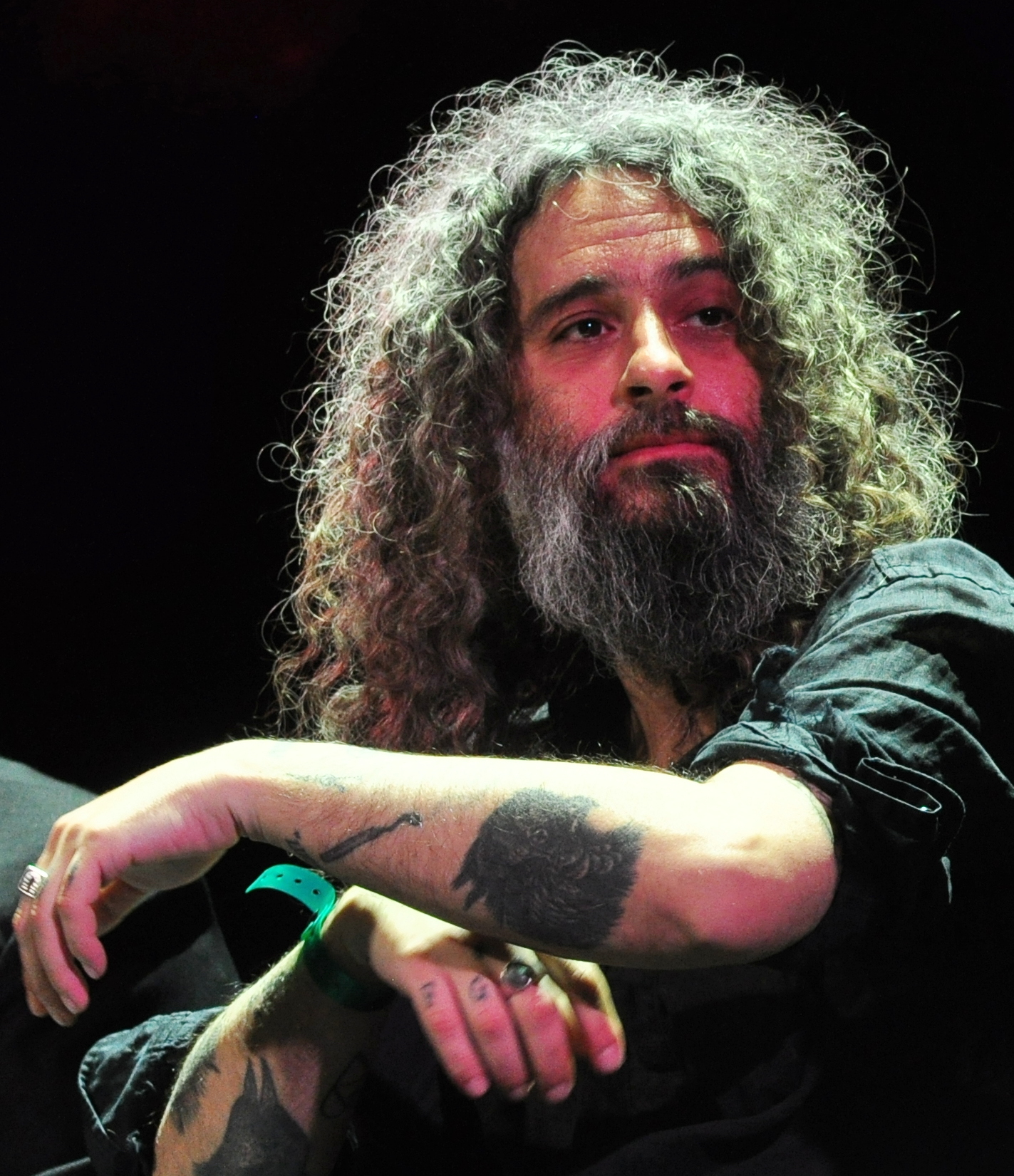
- Menuck in 2019

Background information
- Born: Efrim Manuel Menuck; November 4, 1970 (age 55); Montreal, Quebec, Canada
- Genres: Post-rock; experimental rock; drone
- Occupation: Musician
- Instruments: Guitar, piano, vocals
- Years active: 1993–present
- Labels: Kranky, Constellation

Efrim Manuel Menuck (/məˈnʌk/; born November 4, 1970) is a Canadian composer involved with a number of Montreal-based bands, most notably Godspeed You! Black Emperor and Thee Silver Mt. Zion Memorial Orchestra. Menuck is also a frequent record producer and engineer, working with musicians from Montreal and abroad.

== Biography ==
Menuck was born in Montreal but grew up primarily in Toronto. He moved back to Montreal when he was in his early 20s. His father was a doctor and his mother was a nurse. He attended Hebrew day school from first to ninth grade. After dropping out of high school in 11th grade, Menuck was homeless and jobless and had a nervous breakdown at age 20. Menuck has mentioned that as a teenager he found himself "living in a flooded basement with two other lost kids and a litter of feral kittens. we were all unfed. [sic]" In 1994, Mauro Pezzente, Mike Moya, and Menuck founded Godspeed You! Black Emperor, an influential instrumental rock ensemble. Their first release, a cassette titled All Lights Fucked on the Hairy Amp Drooling, is the earliest recorded document of Godspeed You! Black Emperor. Self-released in December 1994, the cassette was dubbed only 33 times. It was not until the release of their debut album, F♯ A♯ ∞, that they received widespread recognition for their work.

Menuck is also responsible for the creation of Thee Silver Mt. Zion Memorial Orchestra & Tra-La-La Band, along with fellow Godspeed You! Black Emperor members Sophie Trudeau and Thierry Amar. Originally conceived as an aid to Menuck in learning how to score music, the group has since blossomed into a regular collaboration.

When He Has Left Us Alone but Shafts of Light Sometimes Grace the Corner of Our Rooms... debuted, it was notable in that it included vocals by Menuck and his band mates; this was in contrast with the taciturn Godspeed You! Black Emperor. However, Constellation states on the biography for Thee Silver Mt. Zion Memorial Orchestra & Tra-La-La Band that Menuck did in fact sing vocals before the creation of the group on a "rare 1996 GYBE cassette release".

While the music of Godspeed You! Black Emperor was marked by its sampling and symphonic development, Thee Silver Mt. Zion Memorial Orchestra & Tra-La-La Band more regularly incorporated lyrics as well. Menuck confessed to being at odds with the role of the singer in bands, noting that lyricists are often featured as the main attraction at the expense of their bands. He also felt uncomfortable with his own singing, but has since overcome that feeling. Menuck often shares vocal duty with all the other members of A Silver Mt. Zion.

The lyrical style of Menuck is best described as poetic. The topics of his lyrics range from the fear and loneliness experienced while driving alone on an American highway at night to urban decay, and even a tribute to a deceased pet dog. Indeed, "This Is Our Punk-Rock," Thee Rusted Satellites Gather + Sing, the third album by Thee Silver Mt. Zion Memorial Orchestra & Tra-La-La Band, was essentially created as a requiem for open and abandoned spaces in Montreal, as well as for similar loss and decay around the world, due to either urban development or military action. Menuck is also known for integrating politics into song titles, lyrics, and album cover art for A Silver Mt. Zion. As such, references to anarchism and anti-war viewpoints are often expressed; in an April 2014 interview with The Rumpus, he identified as an anarchist.

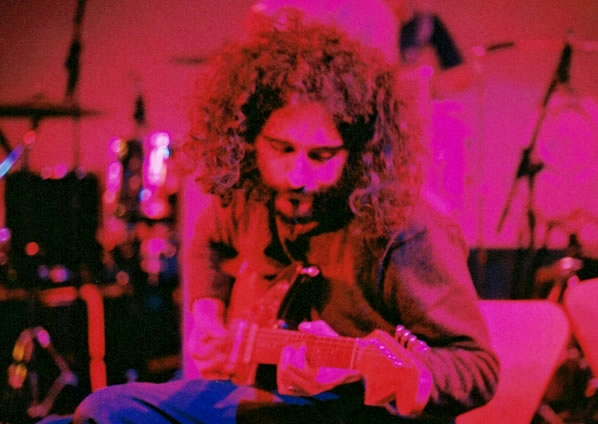
Menuck performing with Godspeed You! Black Emperor in London, England in November 2000

While Menuck sometimes utilizes religious imagery in the lyrics and albums of Thee Silver Mt. Zion Memorial Orchestra & Tra-La-La Band, and described the recording sessions of He Has Left Us Alone but Shafts of Light Sometimes Grace the Corner of Our Rooms... a "Jewish experience", he does not consider himself an adherent of the Jewish faith, quoted in one source as saying "I don't go to synagogue, I don't believe that there's a God in heaven, I don't believe in any of that stuff". With the title of Born into Trouble as the Sparks Fly Upward, the band references the Book of Job Ch. 5:7. Menuck has been an outspoken critic of the Israeli government; the liner notes for Yanqui U.X.O. criticize Ariel Sharon's 2000 visit to the Temple Mount.

Along with Howard Bilerman, Radwan Moumneh and Thierry Amar, Menuck owns and operates the Hotel2Tango, a loft space that acts as a practice area, recording studio and mastering studio. Hotel2Tango was originally confined to the recordings of friends and the bands of the people who own it, but began operating as a studio-for-hire in the early 2000s.

In 2006, Menuck, with Sophie Trudeau and Thierry Amar, assisted in the recording of Carla Bozulich's first release for Constellation Records, Evangelista.

In August 2009, Menuck fathered a son with Silver Mt. Zion violinist Jessica Moss. The couple took him on tour with Vic Chesnutt. Menuck's first official solo project was released via Constellation Records on May 24, 2011. The album is entitled Plays "High Gospel". His second solo album titled Pissing Stars was released on February 2, 2018. Pissing Stars was also released on Constellation Records.

He subsequently joined Ariel Engle in the noise-pop project All Hands Make Light.

In 2026, Menuck contributed the song The beauty of the sun as it leaves to Gaza Is The Moral Compass, a sixteen-track compilation track benefitting Palestinian aid organisations.

== Musical equipment ==
The following is a list of musical equipment used by Efrim Menuck.

=== Guitars ===
- Gibson Les Paul - Gold Top
- Fender Jaguar – Sunburst, modified with a humbucker in the neck position and a Bigsby vibrato tailpiece
- Travis Bean
- Mosrite 'The Ventures' Mach 1 (A Silver Mt Zion)
- Gibson ES-225 (A Silver Mt Zion)

=== Synthesizers ===
- Teenage Engineering OP-1

=== Amplifiers ===
- Ampeg V4 head
- Mesa/Boogie Rectifier Trem-O-Verb head
- Fender Dual Showman

== Discography ==
Godspeed You! Black Emperor

Silver Mt. Zion

Solo discography

- Plays "High Gospel" (2011, Constellation)
- Pissing Stars (2018, Constellation)
- STARLING TROUBLES SPARROW (2020, Longform Editions)

SING, SINCK, SING

- are SING, SINCK, SING (2019, Constellation)

ALL HANDS_MAKE LIGHT

- ALL HANDS_MAKE LIGHT (2021, self-released)
- Darling the Dawn (2023, Constellation)
