= Hotel2Tango =

Recording studio in Montreal

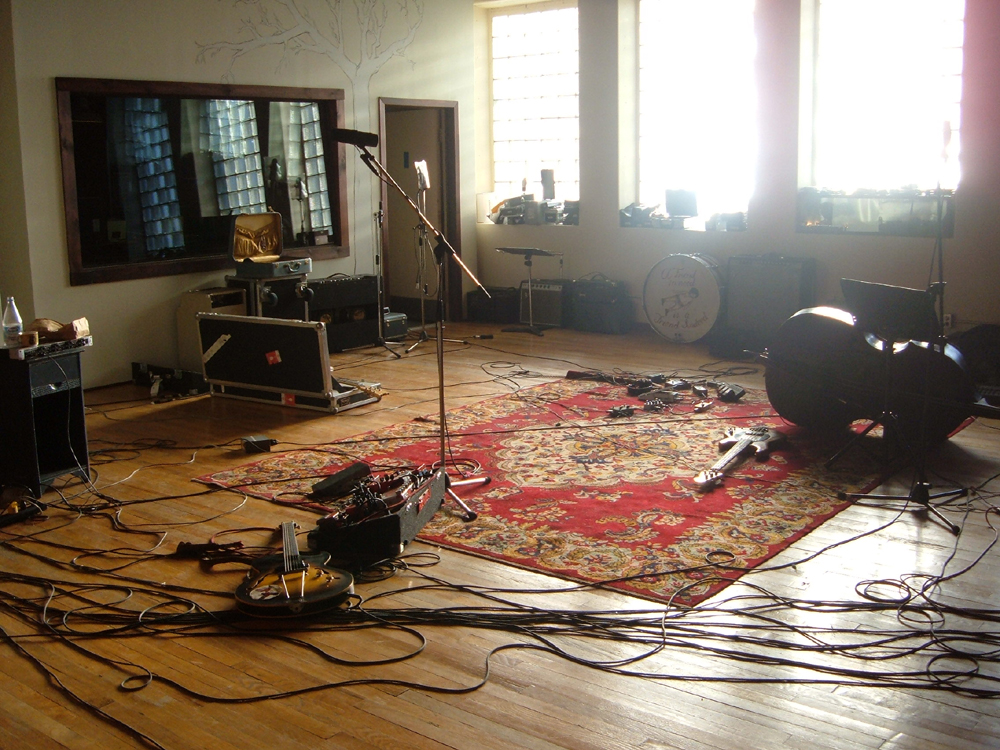
- The tracking room of the new Hotel2Tango
- Interactive map of the Hotel2Tango area

General information
- Location: 110 Ave Van Horne, Montreal, QC
- Coordinates: 45°31′40″N 73°36′25″W
- Opened: 2007; 19 years ago

Website
- www.hotel2tango.com

The Hotel2Tango (sometimes referred to as Thee Mighty Hotel2Tango and abbreviated H2T) is a 24-track analogue recording studio situated in the Mile End district of Montreal, Quebec. The current facility is the second to bear the name, and was preceded by a similar operation in the same neighborhood until 2007 when the studio changed locations. The majority of recording projects undertaken at the studio are helmed by one of the facility's four partner-engineers: Efrim Menuck and Thierry Amar, both members of Thee Silver Mt. Zion Memorial Orchestra & Tra-La-La Band and Godspeed You! Black Emperor; Radwan Ghazi Moumneh, member of Jerusalem in My Heart; and Howard Bilerman. The Hotel2Tango is often closely associated with Constellation Records, a Montreal-based record label.

Before becoming a dedicated studio, the original Hotel2Tango acted first as a living space and later as a live performance venue.

== Original location (1995–2007) ==
Future Godspeed You! Black Emperor member Mauro Pezzente and his partner Kiva Stimac first moved into the space that later became the Hotel2Tango in 1995. The loft doubled as a performance space and was dubbed Gallery Quiva, hosting approximately one show per month. However, after less than a year exhaust fumes and odor from the mechanic's garage directly below the loft forced Pezzente and Stimac to vacate the building. Shortly thereafter the lease was taken over by Efrim Menuck, who took the first three letters of the area's postal code, H2T, and used the NATO phonetic alphabet to create the space's new name: Hotel2Tango. Pezzente and Stimac later opened three highly-influential performance spaces on Saint Laurent Boulevard in Montreal: Casa del Popolo, La Sala Rossa, and the now defunct El Salon.

By 1998, the Hotel2Tango had become one of the most popular alternative music venues in the city of Montreal and acted as a hub for a number of projects by members of the local artistic community. At one point the loft acted as a work space for Montreal silk-screeners the Bloodsisters, and as a workshop for a local carpenter. Godspeed You! Black Emperor performed at the Hotel2Tango frequently and used the loft as a practice space along with other groups such as Fly Pan Am and Molasses. Godspeed also recorded the bulk of their first album, F♯A♯∞ in the loft's large main room the previous year. As the band's popularity grew over the next several years, so too did the mystery surrounding its secretive members. Many rumours developed about the group and its de facto home base. At one point it was commonly believed by outsiders that all of the band members were squatting illegally in the loft. Eventually word spread about the shows taking place at the Hotel2Tango and the crowds arriving each evening came to be greater than the facility could handle. Amid numerous thefts by show attendees and a generally out-of-control crowd, shows at the Hotel2Tango became less frequent and eventually stopped completely, effectively passing the torch to a handful of newly opened dedicated concert venues within the city. At that time at least two people still lived within the walls of the Hotel2Tango, including Godspeed bassist Thierry Amar, though he later moved out.

In 2000 Howard Bilerman, then-owner of Mom and Pop Sounds, a small Montreal recording studio near the city's Chinatown, approached Amar and Menuck, who were interested in focusing on establishing a studio in the Hotel2Tango, about combining the trio's equipment to use in a central space. Finding the offer favourable, the group began consolidating their two facilities; building a number of walls within the Hotel2Tango, effectively separating the space into three areas: a control room, a live room and a large common area. Soon after, the three purchased a professional 24-track analogue tape machine, which became the centerpiece of the new Hotel2Tango studio. The studio had a built-in clientele, quickly becoming the studio of choice for most of the Montreal-based artists on the Constellation Records label. For a number of years the studio remained closed to most outsiders, its operators choosing to concentrate mostly on the projects of friends and those groups directly related to Constellation and another Montreal record label, Fancy Recordings, a now-defunct subsidiary of Alien8 Recordings. In recent years, however, the Hotel2Tango has opened its doors to many other bands from Montreal and abroad, launching a promotional website in September 2004.

== Relocation ==
In early 2006 several people involved with Constellation Records and the Hotel2Tango purchased an industrial building two blocks from the site of the original studio. The building had reportedly been abandoned for about a decade and was nearly to be developed into condominiums at the time of the purchase. The building was renovated over the course of a year in order to house a new Hotel2Tango along with Harris Newman's Grey Market Mastering and the Constellation Records headquarters. The transition between the two locations officially took place in early 2007, with operations in the original building ceasing on February 4.

== Clientele ==
Many groups and musicians have recorded at the Hotel2Tango, including Vic Chesnutt, Sam Roberts Band, Arcade Fire, Thalia Zedek, Wolf Parade, Basia Bulat and Godspeed You! Black Emperor among others. Argentine experimental musician Juana Molina recorded part of her album Doga (2025) at the studio, where she collaborated with Leslie Feist, Andrew Barr and Howard Bilerman.
