= Widespread Panic discography =

- Studio albums: 13
- Live albums: 7
- Compilation albums: 1
- Archive Releases: 4

This is a discography for American rock band Widespread Panic. Since forming in 1986, it has released 13 studio albums, 8 live albums, 1 compilation album and 5 archive albums. Widespread Panic has sold over three million records.

== Albums ==
=== Studio albums ===
Date	Title	Notes
February 4, 1988	Space Wrangler	First released on Landslide Records Recorded at John Keane's home studio in Athens, Georgia
July 30, 1991	Widespread Panic	First released by Capricorn Records and Warner Bros. Records. Recorded at Emerald Sound Studios (Nashville), Kiva Studios (Memphis, Tennessee), and Duck Tape Music Studio (Decatur, Alabama)
March 9, 1993	Everyday	First released by Capricorn Records and Warner Bros. Records Recorded at Muscle Shoals Sound Studio in Sheffield, Alabama; peaked at No. 184 on the Billboard 200
September 6, 1994	Ain't Life Grand	First released by Capricorn Records and Warner Bros. Records; recorded at Keane's studio in Athens; reached No. 85 on the Billboard 200; a single from the album, "Can't Get High", peaked at No. 34 on the Billboard Mainstream Rock chart in 1995
February 4, 1997	Bombs & Butterflies	First released by Capricorn Records; recorded at Keane's studio; peaked at No. 50 on the Billboard 200; a single from the album, "Hope in a Hopeless World", peaked at No. 13 on the Billboard Mainstream Rock Tracks chart in 1997.
July 27, 1999	'Til the Medicine Takes	First released by Capricorn Records; recorded at Keane's studio; peaked at No. 68 on the Billboard 200.
June 19, 2001	Don't Tell the Band	Released through the band's own label, Widespread Records, in conjunction with UK-based label Sanctuary Records; peaked at No. 57 on the Billboard 200
April 15, 2003	Ball	Released through Widespread Records in conjunction with UK-based label Sanctuary Records; reached No. 61 on the Billboard 200
June 13, 2006	Earth to America	Released through Widespread Records in conjunction with UK-based label Sanctuary Records; recorded in Nassau, Bahamas at Compass Point Studios; peaked at No. 48 on the Billboard 200
February 12, 2008	Free Somehow	Released through Widespread Records; recorded in Nassau at Compass Point Studios; peaked at No. 78 on the Billboard 200
May 25, 2010	Dirty Side Down	Released through Widespread Records; climbed to No. 27 on the Billboard 200
September 25, 2015	Street Dogs	Released through Vanguard Records; peaked at No. 53 on the Billboard 200
June 7, 2024	Snake Oil King	Released through Widespread Records
November, 8, 2024	Hailbound Queen	Released through Widespread Records

=== Live albums ===
Date	Title	Notes
April 20, 1998	Light Fuse, Get Away	Album was recorded over various concerts by the band in 1997
May 23, 2000	Another Joyous Occasion	Recorded over the Summer and Fall of 1999 when the band performed shows accompanied by the Dirty Dozen Brass Band
June 11, 2002	Live in the Classic City	Recorded over an April 2000 three-night run in their hometown of Athens, Georgia
March 23, 2004	Night of Joy	Recorded during November 6 & 7, 2003 shows at the House of Blues in Myrtle Beach, South Carolina when the band was accompanied by the Dirty Dozen Brass Band
July 13, 2004	Über Cobra	Recorded during a November 8, 2003 show at the House of Blues in Myrtle Beach
September 28, 2004	Jackassolantern	Recorded during various Halloween shows which the band has performed and is composed of cover songs the band has performed at those shows
February 22, 2005	Live at Myrtle Beach	Recorded during a November 8, 2003 show at the House of Blues in Myrtle Beach
September 28, 2010	Live in the Classic City II	Recorded during a three-night run that took place on April 1–3, 2000 at the Classic Center Theater in Athens
April 21, 2012	Live Wood	Recorded at multiple locations during the acoustic Wood Tour from January–February 2012. 180-gram vinyl only release for Record Store Day 2012
October 16, 2012	Wood	Recorded at multiple locations during the acoustic Wood Tour from January–February 2012
October 23, 2026	Live From Austin TX	Recorded in Austin, TX for Austin City Limits on Halloween, October 31, 2000. New West Records release.

=== Compilation albums ===
Date	Title	Notes
July 3, 2007	Choice Cuts: The Capricorn Years 1991–1999	14 song compilation which features song selections from Widespread Panic albums released by Capricorn Records

=== Archive releases ===
==== Multi track recordings ====
Starting in June 2008, Widespread Panic began to release vintage concert performances from the Widespread Panic Archives. The band will continue to dig into their show archives, which encompasses the past 40 years, and release these shows as multi-track recordings.

Date of Official Release	Title	Notes
June 10, 2008	Carbondale 2000	Recorded live at Southern Illinois University Arena in Carbondale, Illinois on December 1, 2000
February 24, 2009	Valdosta 1989	Recorded live at The Armory in Valdosta, Georgia on April 8, 1989
June 23, 2009	Huntsville 1996	Recorded live at Von Braun Civic Center Arena in Huntsville, Alabama on April 3, 1996
October 6, 2009	Montreal 1997	Recorded live at Club Soda in Montreal, Quebec, Canada on September 8, 1997
November 19, 2010	Johnson City 2001	Recorded live at Freedom Hall in Johnson City, Tennessee on November 20, 2001
June 28, 2011	Colorado Springs 1998	Recorded live at City Auditorium in Colorado Springs, Colorado on October 20, 1998
December 13, 2011	History Lesson New Years 1997	Recorded live at the Fox Theatre in Atlanta on December 31, 1997
May 28, 2013	Oak Mountain 2001 – Night 1	Recorded live at Oak Mountain Amphitheatre in Pelham, Alabama on July 27, 2001
December 5, 2013	Oak Mountain 2001 – Night 2	Recorded live at Oak Mountain Amphitheatre in Pelham on July 28, 2001
May 13, 2014	Oak Mountain 2001 – Night 3	Recorded live at Oak Mountain Amphitheatre in Pelham on July 29, 2001
March 31, 2017	Jacksonville 1999	Recorded live at the Moran Theater in Jacksonville, Florida on April 27, 1999
August 28, 2017	Columbia 1995	Recorded live at Blue Note Theater in Columbia, Missouri on July 11, 1995
July 20, 2018	Knoxville 1995	Recorded live at Tennessee Amphitheater in Knoxville, Tennessee on September 28, 1995
November 16, 2018	Northampton 1998	Recorded live at Calvin Theatre in Northampton, Massachusetts on November 17, 1998
August 18, 2023	Boone 1999	Recorded live at Varsity Gym at Appalachian State University in Boone, North Carolina on April 22, 1999
October 5, 2023	Hampton 1999	Recorded live at Hampton Coliseum in Hampton, Virginia on November 27, 1999
October 11, 2024	Warfield 2000	Recorded live at Warfield Theatre in San Francisco on July 4, 2000
April 04, 2025	Athens 1998	Recorded live at Washington Street in Athens on April 18, 1998
June 13, 2025	Murfreesboro 2001	Recorded live at Murphy Center in Murfreesboro, Tennessee on April 28, 2001
October 11, 2024	Baltimore 1997	Recorded live at Pier Six Pavilion in Baltimore, Maryland on July 9, 1997
December 12, 2025	Syracuse 2001	Recorded live at Landmark Theater in Syracuse, New York on November 6, 2001

==== Porch Songs ====
In December 2009, the band began releasing 2-track soundboard recordings of various archived shows. Because soundboard recordings are less time-consuming than multi-tracks, this project, named Porch Songs, allows the band to deliver show recordings in a timely fashion while they continue to release 3–4 multi-track recordings a year.

Date of official release	Title	Recorded
December 3, 2009	Mud Island '97	Recorded live at Mud Island Amphitheater Arena in Memphis on July 18 & 19, 1997
January 26, 2010	June 2001 Santa Fe	Recorded live at Paolo Soleri, Santa Fe, New Mexico June 19 & 20, 2001
February 23, 2010	Wilmington, DE 2001	Recorded live at Kahuna Summer Stage in Wilmington, Delaware on July 22, 2001
March 14, 2010	Milwaukee, WI 1996	Recorded live at Modjeska Theatre in Milwaukee on November 1, 1996
April 20, 2010	Chicago, IL 1996	Recorded live at Aragon Ballroom in Chicago on October 31, 1996
August 31, 2010	Morrison, CO 1996	Recorded live at Red Rocks Amphitheatre in Morrison, Colorado on May 31, 1996
February 5, 2011	Jackson, WY '96	Recorded live at Grandroom, Snow King Center Arena in Jackson, Wyoming on February 6 & 7, 1996
November 18, 2011	Geneva, MN 2001	Recorded live at Harmony Park Music Garden in Geneva, Minnesota on July 4, 2001
March 13, 2012	Grand Junction, CO 1996	Recorded live at Two Rivers Auditorium in Grand Junction, Colorado on June 10, 1996
May 24, 2012	Omaha, NE 1997	Recorded live at Ranch Bowl in Omaha, Nebraska on July 1, 1997
June 29, 2012	Louisville, KY 1997	Recorded live at The Palace in Louisville, Kentucky on May 7, 1997
July 31, 2012	Atlanta, GA 1998	Recorded live at Fox Theatre in Atlanta on January 2, 1998
August 31, 2012	Kalamazoo, MI 1997	Recorded live at State Theater in Kalamazoo, Michigan on November 11, 1997
December 17, 2012	Morrison, CO 2001	Recorded live at Red Rocks Amphitheatre in Morrison on June 22–24, 2001
March 12, 2013	Oxford, MS 1995	Recorded live at Tad Smith Coliseum in Oxford, Mississippi on September 22, 1995
August 13, 2013	Glenside, PA 1995	Recorded live at the Keswick Theatre in Glenside, Pennsylvania on September 15, 1995
January 31, 2014	Memphis, TN 2000	Recorded live at Mid-South Coliseum in Memphis on November 24, 2000
February 28, 2014	Memphis, TN 2000	Recorded live at Mid-South Coliseum in Memphis on November 25, 2000
August 19, 2014	Bozeman, MT 2001	Recorded live at Brick Breeden Fieldhouse in Bozeman, Montana on October 19, 2001
November 18, 2014	Chattanooga, TN 2001	Recorded live at McKenzie Arena in Chattanooga, Tennessee on November 21, 2001
December 16, 2014	Cedar Rapids 2002	Recorded live at US Cellular Center in Cedar Rapids, Iowa on July 2, 2002
February 24, 2015	Santa Cruz 1992	Recorded live at The Catalyst in Santa Cruz, California on April 18, 1992
January 19, 2017	Asheville 2000	Recorded live at Asheville Civic Center in Asheville, North Carolina on November 22, 2000
February 24, 2017	Charlotte 2001	Recorded live at Independence Arena in Charlotte, North Carolina on November 17, 2001
April 17, 2017	San Francisco 1992	Recorded live at Warfield Theatre in San Francisco on April 17, 1992
May 22, 2017	Pittsburgh 1995	Recorded live at Metropol in Pittsburgh on April 11, 1995
June 16, 2017	Red Rocks 1991	Recorded live at Red Rocks Amphitheatre in Morrison, Colorado on September 14, 1991
February 21, 2018	Bozeman 2000	Recorded live at Brick Breeden Fieldhouse in Bozeman, Montana on November 10, 2000
March 21, 2018	Tempe 1995	Recorded live at Hayden Square in Tempe, Arizona on May 18, 1995
May 16, 2018	Detroit 1996	Recorded live at State Theatre in Detroit on June 19, 1996
June 6, 2018	Winston-Salem 1991	Recorded live at Ziggy's in Winston-Salem, North Carolina on November 8, 1991
June 13, 2018	Koblenz 1998	Recorded live at Rockpalast Open Air Festival in Koblenz, Germany on June 21, 1998
September 21, 2018	Mobile 1996	Recorded live at Bayfest in Mobile, Alabama on October 5, 1996
October 12, 2018	New Orleans 1992	Recorded live at Tipitina's in New Orleans on October 26, 1992

== Other appearances ==
Year	Song	Album
1992	"Papa's Home"	The Mother Of All Flagpole Christmas Albums
1993	"Walkin' (For Your Love)" "Pickin' Up The Pieces"	The 2nd Consecutive Migration Of The Great American H.O.R.D.E. Festival
1993	"Walkin' (For Your Love)"	The Best Of Mountain Stage Live, Vol. 5
1995	"And It Stoned Me"	Hempilation: Freedom Is NORML
1997	"Stop-Go"	To The Extreme
1997	"Aunt Avis (live)"	KBCO Studio C Volume 9
1997	"Hope In A Hopeless World"	KGSR Broadcasts Vol. 5
1999	"The Take Out"	Scrapple (Original Motion Picture Soundtrack)
2000	"Cream Puff War"	Stolen Roses: Songs of the Grateful Dead
2002	"Tall Boy > Testify > Tall Boy" (with Dottie Peoples)	Live From Bonnaroo
2003	"Give"	Carved in Stone
2004	"Ain't No Horse"	The Q People: A Tribute to NRBQ
2007	"Crippled Inside"	Instant Karma: The Amnesty International Campaign to Save Darfur (iTunes edition)
2007	"Chest Fever"	Endless Highway: The Music of The Band
2009	"Up All Night"	97.3 KBCO Studio C Volume Twenty-One
2009	"Werewolves Of London"	Californication Season 3 – Music From The Showtime Series
2011	"Old Neighborhood"	Use Me – David Bromberg
2014	"Solid Rock"	Bob Dylan in the 80s: Volume One
2014	"Just Ain't Easy" "Wasted Words" (with Derek Trucks)	All My Friends: Celebrating The Songs & Voice Of Gregg Allman – Gregg Allman
2016	"Morning Dew"	Dear Jerry: Celebrating The Music Of Jerry Garcia
