= Oak Mountain 2001 – Night 3 =

Live album by Widespread Panic
- Released: May 13, 2014
- Recorded: July 29, 2001
- Genre: Rock, Southern rock, jam
- Label: Widespread Records

Widespread Panic chronology
Oak Mountain 2001 – Night 2 (2013)	Oak Mountain 2001 – Night 3 (2014)

Oak Mountain 2001 – Night 3 is a live album by Athens, Georgia's Widespread Panic. This album features a multi-track recording of a performance by the band at Oak Mountain Amphitheater in Pelham, Alabama from 2001. The 3-disc set is the eighth multi-track release from the Widespread Panic Archives. The performance was recorded live on July 29, 2001. The album was released online and in local independent record stores on May 13, 2014 and is available on CD or as a digital download. The album features the six original members of the band: John Bell, John “JoJo” Hermann, Todd Nance, Domingo “Sunny” Ortiz, Dave Schools, and the late guitarist Michael Houser.

From 1990 – 2002, Widespread Panic and their fans held an annual gathering at the amphitheatre. Oak Mountain Amphitheatre has set the Widespread Panic record for the most total consecutive years playing at the same venue at 13.

This was the first time the band covered Bob Marley's 'Stir It Up' in 1880 shows, since 1988.

== Track listing ==
=== Disc 1 ===
1. Bowlegged Woman (Calvin Carter/Bobby Rush) - 10:22
2. Space Wrangler (Widespread Panic) - 8:11
3. Walkin' (For Your Love) (Widespread Panic) - 9:08
4. Little Lilly (Widespread Panic) - 8:32
5. I'm Not Alone (Widespread Panic) - 6:11
6. Sleeping Man (Vic Chesnutt) - (7:24)
7. Don't Tell The Band (Widespread Panic) - 4:08
8. Visiting Day (Widespread Panic) - 6:20
9. Henry Parsons Died (Eric Carter/Daniel Hutchens) - 6:16

=== Disc 2 ===
1. Travelin' Light (J.J. Cale) - 7:00
2. Thought Sausage (Widespread Panic) - 5:09
3. Sharon (David Bromberg) - 8:34
4. North (Jerry Joseph) - 6:26
5. Stop Breakin' Down (Robert Johnson) - 7:14
6. Pilgrims (Widespread Panic) - 7:22
7. Diner (Widespread Panic) - 16:41
8. Pilgrims (Widespread Panic) - :58

=== Disc 3 ===
1. Drums (Widespread Panic) - 25:14
2. Stir It Up (Bob Marley) - 7:37
3. Give (Widespread Panic) - 4:18
4. The Wind Cries Mary (Jimi Hendrix) - 4:04
5. Climb to Safety (Jerry Joseph/Glen Esparaza) - 5:23
6. Porch Song (Widespread Panic) - 3:27

== Personnel ==
=== Widespread Panic ===
- John "JB" Bell – Vocals, Guitar
- Michael Houser – Guitar, Vocals
- David Schools – Bass, Vocals
- John "JoJo" Hermann – Keyboard, Vocals
- Todd Nance – Drums
- Domingo S. Ortiz – Percussion

=== Guest performers ===
- Dr. Arvin Scott – Percussion
