= Morrison, CO 2001 =

Live album by Widespread Panic
- Released: December 17, 2012
- Recorded: June 22–24, 2001
- Genre: Rock, southern rock, jam
- Label: Widespread Records

Morrison, CO 2001 is a series of three complete concerts by Widespread Panic. This performance was recorded live at Red Rocks Amphitheatre in Morrison, Colorado on June 22–24, 2001. The two-track soundboard recording features all original band members including late guitarist Michael Houser.

This was the 14th installment in the Porch Songs series. The first two nights feature guests Cecil Daniels, and Luther Dickinson and Cody Dickinson from the North Mississippi Allstars. Cecil Daniels also guests on June 24. June 22 was the first and only time the band has played John Lee Hooker's blues classic Boogie Chillen'. June 23 was the live debut of the song Don't Tell The Band.

== Track listing ==
=== June 22, 2001 ===
==== Disc 1 ====
1. Little Kin (Widespread Panic) - 6:28
2. Ain't Life Grand (Widespread Panic) - 6:52
3. Can't Get High (Hutchens/Carter) - 3:26
4. Heroes (Widespread Panic) - 4:56
5. Junior (Junior Kimbrough) - 10:39
6. LA (Widespread Panic) - 3:55
7. Raise The Roof (Widespread Panic) - 5:24
8. Fishwater (Widespread Panic) - 9:49
9. Airplane (Widespread Panic) - 9:34
10. Jack (Widespread Panic) - 8:15
11. Blackout Blues (Widespread Panic) - 6:39

==== Disc 2 ====
1. Action Man (Widespread Panic) - 4:59
2. Thought Sausage (Widespread Panic) - 4:36
3. Little Lilly (Widespread Panic) - 9:03
4. Blue Indian (Widespread Panic) - 4:43
5. Pigeons (Widespread Panic) - 10:46
6. Boogie Chillen' (John Lee Hooker) - 13:41

==== Disc 3 ====
1. Drums (Widespread Panic) - 18:06
2. Love Tractor (Widespread Panic) - 8:19
3. Pilgrims (Widespread Panic) - 6:58
4. All Time Low (Widespread Panic) - 4:12
5. Low Spark Of High Heeled Boys (Capaldi/Winwood) - 9:54

=== June 23, 2001 ===
==== Disc 1 ====
1. Radio Child (Widespread Panic) - 5:05
2. Machine (Widespread Panic) - 3:12
3. Barstools and Dreamers (Widespread Panic) - 10:39
4. Ride Me High (J.J. Cale) - 8:13
5. Tie Your Shoes (Widespread Panic) - 11:08
6. I'm Not Alone (Widespread Panic) - 5:48
7. Dyin' Man (Widespread Panic) - 5:48
8. Down (Widespread Panic) - 4:00
9. Don't Tell The Band (Widespread Panic) - 4:16

==== Disc 2 ====
1. Disco (Widespread Panic) - 5:41
2. North (Jerry Joseph) - 6:28
3. Visiting Day (Widespread Panic) - 8:12
4. Porch Song (Widespread Panic) - 6:42
5. Diner (Widespread Panic) - 16:15
6. Greta (Widespread Panic) - 16:38

==== Disc 3 ====
1. Drums (Widespread Panic) - 25:56
2. Pusherman (Curtis Mayfield) - 8:37
3. Pickin' Up The Pieces (Widespread Panic) - 7:09
4. No Sugar Tonight/New Mother Nature (Randy Bachman/Burton Cummings) - 5:12
5. Me and the Devil Blues (Robert Johnson) - 8:17
6. Flat Foot Flewzy (NRBQ) - 6:31

=== June 24, 2001 ===
==== Disc 1 ====
1. Pleas (Widespread Panic) - 3:32
2. Imitation Leather Shoes (Widespread Panic) - 4:35
3. Walkin' (For Your Love) (Widespread Panic) - 7:40
4. C. Brown (Widespread Panic) - 6:51
5. Better Off (T Lavitz/Widespread Panic) - 5:17
6. Trouble (Cat Stevens) - 3:36
7. Driving Song (Widespread Panic) - 4:05
8. Can't Find My Way Home (Steve Winwood) - 7:28
9. Driving Song (Widespread Panic) - 2:22
10. Travelin' Light (J.J. Cale) - 6:09

==== Disc 2 ====
1. Let's Get Down To Business (Vic Chesnutt) - 4:49
2. One Arm Steve (Widespread Panic) - 3:34
3. Old Joe (Widespread Panic) - 3:25
4. Sleeping Man (Vic Chesnutt) - 18:41
5. Happy (Widespread Panic) - 8:47
6. Bears Gone Fishin (Widespread Panic) - 13:37

==== Disc 3 ====
1. Drums (Widespread Panic) - 14:38
2. This Part of Town (Widespread Panic) - 5:17
3. Swamp (David Byrne) - 6:21
4. Climb to Safety (Jerry Joseph / Glen Esparaza) - 6:02
5. Papa's Home (Widespread Panic) - 7:08
6. Surprise Valley (Widespread Panic) - 7:33
7. Papa's Home (Widespread Panic) - :54
8. City Of Dreams (David Byrne/Chris Franz/Jerry Harrison/Tina Weymouth) - 7:29

== Personnel ==
=== Widespread Panic ===
- John Bell - Vocals, Guitar
- Michael Houser - Guitar, Vocals
- Dave Schools - Bass
- Todd Nance - Drums
- John "Jojo" Hermann - Keyboards, Vocals
- Domingo "Sunny" Ortiz - Percussion
