= Oak Mountain 2001 – Night 2 =

Live album by Widespread Panic
- Released: December 5, 2013
- Recorded: July 28, 2001
- Genres: Rock, Southern rock, jam
- Label: Widespread Records

Widespread Panic chronology
Oak Mountain 2001 – Night 1 (2013)	Oak Mountain 2001 – Night 2 (2013)	Oak Mountain 2001 – Night 3 (2014)

Oak Mountain 2001 – Night 2 is a live album by Athens, Georgia's Widespread Panic. This album features a multi-track recording of a performance by the band at Oak Mountain Amphitheater in Pelham, Alabama from 2001. The 3-disc set is the eighth multi-track release from the Widespread Panic Archives. The performance was recorded live on July 28, 2001. The album was released online and in local independent record stores on December 5, 2013 and is available on CD or as a digital download. The album features the six original members of the band: John Bell, John “JoJo” Hermann, Todd Nance, Domingo “Sunny” Ortiz, Dave Schools, and the late guitarist Michael Houser.

From 1990 – 2002, Widespread Panic and their fans held an annual gathering at the amphitheatre. Oak Mountain Amphitheatre has set the Widespread Panic record for the most total consecutive years playing at the same venue at 13.

this was the first time the band covered Little Feat's "Down On the Farm" in 250 shows, since 1999. In addition to the songs listed, they also teased The Beatles' "Hey Jude" and the Allman Brothers Band's "In Memory of Elizabeth Reed".

== Track listing ==
=== Disc 1 ===
1. Postcard (Widespread Panic) - 5:08
2. Ophelia (Robbie Robertson) - 4:06
3. Coconut (Widespread Panic) - 6:40
4. LA (Widespread Panic) - 4:15
5. Impossible (Widespread Panic) - 9:11
6. Mercy (Widespread Panic) - 9:36
7. Worry (Widespread Panic) - 7:40
8. Dear Mr. Fantasy (Capaldi, Steve Winwood, Chris Wood) - 5:17
9. Imitation Leather Shoes (Widespread Panic) - 4:14

=== Disc 2 ===
1. Casa Del Grillo (Widespread Panic) - 7:59
2. Surprise Valley (Widespread Panic) - 9:25
3. Down On The Farm (Paul Barrere) - 5:14
4. Holden Oversoul (Widespread Panic) - 7:31
5. All Time Low (Widespread Panic) - 4:17
6. Arleen (Winston Riley - 11:56
7. Drums (Widespread Panic) - 18:35

=== Disc 3 ===
1. Astronomy Domine (Syd Barrett) - 3:43
2. All Along The Watchtower (Bob Dylan) - 5:33
3. Fishwater (Widespread Panic) - 8:50

=== Encore ===
1. Down (Widespread Panic) - 4:48
2. Ain't Life Grand (Widespread Panic) - 5:01

== Personnel ==
=== Widespread Panic ===
- John "JB" Bell – Vocals, Guitar
- Michael Houser – Guitar, Vocals
- David Schools – Bass, Vocals
- John "JoJo" Hermann – Keyboard, Vocals
- Todd Nance – Drums
- Domingo S. Ortiz – Percussion

=== Guest performers ===
- Dr. Arvin Scott – Percussion
- Peter Jackson – Percussion
