= Atlanta, GA 1998 =

Live album by Widespread Panic
- Released: July 31, 2012
- Recorded: January 2, 1998
- Genre: Rock, southern rock, jam
- Label: Widespread Records

Atlanta, GA 1998 is a live release by Athens, Georgia's Widespread Panic. These performances were recorded live at The Fox Theatre in Atlanta, GA on January 2, 1998. This was the final show of the 1997 New Year's run. This recording features all original band members including late guitarist Michael Houser.

The show features numerous guest appearances from Count M'Butu, Reverend Jeff Mosier, Randall Bramblett, Chris Yuella and Col. Bruce Hampton.

== Track listing ==
=== Disc 1 ===
1. Tie Your Shoes (Widespread Panic) - 8:55
2. Tall Boy (Widespread Panic) - 11:16
3. Hatfield (Widespread Panic) - 11:08
4. Happy Child (Widespread Panic) - 1:21
5. Dear Mr. Fantasy (Capaldi/Windwood) - 6:01
6. Gradle (Widespread Panic) - 5:58
7. Sleeping Man (Vic Chesnutt) - 7:22
8. Chunk Of Coal (Billy Joe Shaver) - 6:15
9. Weight Of The World (Widespread Panic) - 5:44
10. Worry (Widespread Panic) - 7:22

=== Disc 2 ===
1. Ain't Life Grand (Widespread Panic) - 5:19
2. Contentment Blues (Widespread Panic) - 6:02
3. Postcard (Widespread Panic) - 5:43
4. Jack (Widespread Panic) - 7:48
5. Airplane (Widespread Panic) - 12:45
6. Low Rider (War) - 10:18
7. Drums (Widespread Panic) - 12:08

=== Disc 3 ===
1. I Walk on Guilded Splinters (Rebbenack) - 14:01
2. Space Wrangler (Widespread Panic) - 9:40
3. Low Spark Of High Heeled Boys (Capaldi/Winwood) - 9:24
4. Time is Free (David Earle Johnson) - 7:12
5. Low Spark Of High Heeled Boys (Capaldi/Winwood) - 5:04

== Personnel ==
=== Widespread Panic ===
- John Bell – Vocals, Guitar
- Michael Houser – Guitar, Vocals
- Dave Schools – Bass
- Todd Nance – Drums
- John "Jojo" Hermann – Keyboards, Vocals
- Domingo "Sunny" Ortiz – Percussion

=== Production ===
- Recorded by Daniel Friedman
- Post-Production by Matt DeCamp
