= Widespread Panic videography =

Widespread Panic performing at Forecastle Festival, July 2009.

This is a videography for American rock band Widespread Panic. Widespread Panic formed in Athens, GA in 1986, and soon became known for their live shows. The band has since released 14 videos showcasing these performances.

== Videos ==
Release date	Title	Recording date and location
June 21, 2001	Live at Oak Mountain	August 12, 2000; Oak Mountain Amphitheater, Pelham, AL
November 5, 2002	The Earth Will Swallow You	Recorded at various locations throughout summer of 2000
November 19, 2002	Panic in the Streets	April 18, 1998; Light Fuse Get Away CD release party, Athens, GA
February 4, 2003	Live From The Backyard	July 20, 2002, Austin, TX
November 14, 2006	Earth to Atlanta	May 9, 2006, Fox Theater, Atlanta, GA
October 22, 2008	Live From Austin, TX	October 31, 2000, Austin City Limits, Austin TX
October 17, 2010	Live in Oakland	October 15–17, 2010; Fox Theater, Oakland, CA
February 11, 2011	Live at The Classic Center	February 10 & 11, 2011; The Classic Center, Athens, GA
April 15, 2011	Live at BJCC Arena	April 15, 2011; BJCC Arena, Birmingham, AL
April 16, 2011	Live at Oak Mountain	April 16, 2011; Oak Mountain, Pelham, AL
July 3, 2011	Live at Grand Targhee Resort	July 1–3, 2011; Grand Targhee Resort, Alta, WY
October 31, 2011	Live from Aragon Ballroom	October 31, 2011; Aragon Ballroom, Chicago, IL
January 29, 2012	Live at The Tabernacle	January 27–29, 2012; The Tabernacle, Atlanta, GA
February 12, 2012	Live at The Fillmore Auditorium	February 10–12, 2012; The Fillmore Auditorium, Denver, CO
