= Live at Oak Mountain =

Video by Widespread Panic
- Released: October 9, 2001
- Recorded: August 12, 2000
- Label: Widespread Records
- Producer: LiveJam HD

Professional ratings
Review scores
Source	Rating
AllMusic	3.5/5 stars

Live at Oak Mountain is a live DVD concert by American rock group Widespread Panic, filmed at Oak Mountain Amphitheater in Pelham, Alabama on August 12, 2000.

== Personnel ==
=== Widespread Panic ===
- John Bell – Vocals, Guitar
- John "JoJo" Hermann – Keyboards, Vocals
- Michael Houser – Guitar
- Todd Nance – Drums, Vocals
- Domingo S. Ortiz – Percussion, Vocals
- Dave Schools – Bass, Vocals
