= Huntsville 1996 =

Live album by Widespread Panic
- Released: June 23, 2009
- Recorded: April 3, 1996
- Genre: Rock, southern rock, jam
- Label: Widespread Records

Widespread Panic chronology
Valdosta 1989 (2005)	Huntsville 1996 (2008)	Montreal 1997 (2009)

Huntsville 1996 is a live album by Athens, Georgia's Widespread Panic. The three disc set is the third release from the Widespread Panic archives. The performance was recorded live at Von Braun Civic Center Arena in Huntsville, Alabama on April 3, 1996. The multi-track recordings feature all original band members including late guitarist Michael Houser.

== Track listing ==
=== Disc 1 ===
1. "Better Off" (Widespread Panic) - 5:34
2. "Pigeons" (Widespread Panic) - 10:10
3. "Let's Get Down To Business" (Vic Chesnutt) - 4:28
4. "Radio Child" (Widespread Panic) - 6:08
5. "Pilgrims" (Widespread Panic) - 6:41
6. "Solace" (Scott Joplin) - 1:39
7. "1x1" (John Hermann / Bill McCrory) - 5:07
8. "Maggot Brain" (George Clinton & Eddie Hazel) - 7:59
9. "Can't Get High" (Daniel Hutchens / Eric Carter) - 4:28
10. "Sandbox" (Michael Houser) - 4:48
11. "Papa's Home" (Widespread Panic) - 10:23

=== Disc 2 ===
1. "Diner" (Widespread Panic) - 13:47
2. "Porch Song" (Widespread Panic) - 3:39
3. "Pleas" (Widespread Panic) - 5:54
4. "I'm Not Alone" (Widespread Panic) - 5:55
5. "Tie Your Shoes" (Widespread Panic) - 7:56
6. "Arleen > Satisfied > Arleen" (Winston Riley/Van Morrison) - 14:18
7. "Vacation" (Widespread Panic) - 9:33
8. "Drums" (Widespread Panic) - 4:59

=== Disc 3 ===
1. "I Walk On Guilded Splinters" (Mac Rebennack) - 12:10
2. "Blackout Blues" (Widespread Panic) - 5:56
3. "Contentment Blues" (Widespread Panic) - 6:06
4. "Love Tractor" (Widespread Panic) - 6:34
5. "Can't Find My Way Home" (Steve Winwood) - 5:51

== Personnel ==
=== Widespread Panic ===
- John "JB" Bell - Vocals, Guitar
- Michael Houser - Guitar, Vocals
- David Schools - Bass, Vocals
- John "JoJo" Hermann - Keyboards, Vocals
- Todd Nance - Drums
- Domingo "Sunny" Ortiz - Percussion

=== Personnel ===
- Mixed by Chris Rabold and Drew Vandenberg at Chase Park Transduction in Athens, GA.
- Recorded by Tim Wright
- Mastered by Jeff Capurso
- Packaging by Chris Bilheimer
