= Johnson City 2001 =

Live album by Widespread Panic
- Released: November 19, 2010
- Recorded: November 20, 2001
- Genre: Rock, southern rock, jam
- Label: Widespread Records

Widespread Panic chronology
Montreal 1997 (2010)	Johnson City 2001 (2010)	Colorado Springs 1998 (2011)

Johnson City 2001 is a complete concert album by Widespread Panic. The three disc set is the fifth release from the Widespread Panic archives. The performance was recorded live at Freedom Hall Civic Center in Johnson City, Tennessee on November 20, 2001. The multi-track recording featured all original band members including the late guitarist, Michael Houser.

== Track listing ==
=== Disc 1 ===
1. "L.A." (Widespread Panic) - 4:45
2. "Wondering" (Widespread Panic) - 7:41
3. "It Ain't No Use" (Joseph "Zigaboo" Modeliste / Art Neville / Leo Nocentelli / George Porter Jr.) - 10:27
4. "Impossible" (Widespread Panic) - 5:04
5. "Worry" (Widespread Panic) - 7:16
6. "New Blue" (Widespread Panic) - 4:41
7. "Holden Oversoul" (Widespread Panic) - 8:03
8. "Stop-Go" (Widespread Panic) - 10:20
9. "Makes Sense To Me" (Daniel Hutchens) - 4:27

=== Disc 2 ===
1. "Weak Brain, Narrow Mind" (Willie Dixon) - 9:13
2. "One Arm Steve" (Widespread Panic) - 4:04
3. "Old Neighborhood" (Widespread Panic) - 6:22
4. "Trouble" (Cat Stevens) - 2:57
5. "Love Tractor" (Widespread Panic) - 7:18
6. "Pigeons" (Widespread Panic) - 11:37
7. "Airplane" (Widespread Panic) - 14:06
8. "Drums" (Widespread Panic) - 16:27

=== Disc 3 ===
1. "Drums and Bass" (Widespread Panic) - 7:41
2. "Astronomy Domine" (Syd Barrett) - 2:45
3. "Good Morning Little School Girl (Sonny Boy Williamson I)"- 8:16
4. "The Waker" (Widespread Panic) - 4:50
5. "She Caught the Katy (Taj Mahal / James Rachell)" - 4:21
6. "Gimme" (Widespread Panic) - 5:24
7. "Chunk of Coal" (Billy Joe Shaver) - 4:23

== Personnel ==
=== Widespread Panic ===
- John Bell - Vocals, Guitar
- Michael Houser - Guitar, Vocals
- Dave Schools - Bass, Vocals
- Todd Nance - Drums
- John "Jojo" Hermann - Keyboards, Vocals
- Domingo "Sunny" Ortiz - Percussion

=== Production ===
- Mixed by Chris Rabold and Drew Vandenberg at Chase Park Transduction in Athens, GA.
- Recorded by Brad Blettenberg
- Mastered by Drew Vandenberg at Chase Park Transduction Studios in Athens, GA.
- Setlist by Garrie Vereen
- Additional audience recordings provided by Charles Fox
