= Smiling Assassin =

Studio album by John Hermann
- Released: April 10, 2001
- Genre: Rock, southern rock
- Length: 42:48
- Label: Fat Possum Records
- Producer: John Hermann; Bruce Watson

John Hermann chronology
Smiling Assassin (2001)	Defector (2003)

Smiling Assassin is the debut solo album by Widespread Panic keyboardist John Hermann, released in 2001. Other members of Widespread Panic as well as members of the North Mississippi All Stars and Blue Mountain also perform on the album.

== Track listing ==
All tracks written by John Hermann except where noted.

1. "Hell for Horses" 2:43
2. "Smiling Assassin" 4:08
3. "Mountain Hideaway" 3:41
4. "Abilene" 4:19
5. "Don't Look Down" 3:56
6. "Lazy Bum" 3:44
7. "Run You Down" 3:18
8. "Don't Throw It Away" 5:11
9. "Swamp Tag" 2:43
10. "Daisy Mae" 3:56
11. "Lonely Avenue" (Doc Pomus) 5:09

== Personnel ==
=== Musicians ===
- John Hermann – guitar, keyboards, vocals
- John Bell – vocals
- Michael Houser – guitar
- Todd Nance – 12 string guitar, shaker
- Domingo Ortiz – percussion
- George McConnell – guitar
- Luther Dickinson – guitar
- Cody Dickinson – drums
- Paul Edwards – bass
- Cary Hudson – harmonica, violin
- John Keane – shaker

=== Production ===
- John Hermann – producer
- Bruce Watson – producer, engineer
- John Keane – mixing
- Michael Iacopelli – mastering
- Steve Roberts – cover photo
- Brandon "Wundabred" Seavers – design, layout design
