= Kalamazoo, MI 1997 =

Live album by Widespread Panic

Live album by Widespread Panic
- Released: August 31, 2012
- Recorded: November 11, 1997
- Genre: Rock, southern rock, jam
- Label: Widespread Records

Kalamazoo, MI 1997 is a live release by Athens, Georgia's Widespread Panic. These performances were recorded live at The State Theater in Kalamazoo, Michigan on November 11, 1997. This recording features all original band members including late guitarist Michael Houser.

This was the 13th installment of the Porch Songs series.

== Track listing ==
=== Disc 1 ===
1. Weight Of The World (Widespread Panic) – 6:32
2. Aunt Avis (Vic Chesnutt) – 6:41
3. Walkin' (For Your Love) (Widespread Panic) – 5:34
4. You'll Be Fine (Widespread Panic) – 3:19
5. Glory (Widespread Panic) – 3:48
6. Rock (Widespread Panic) – 8:01
7. Big Wooly Mammoth (Widespread Panic) – 7:53
8. One Kind Favor (Son House) – 7:12
9. Love Tractor (Widespread Panic) – 5:57

=== Disc 2 ===
1. Let's Get Down To Business (Vic Chesnutt) – 6:49
2. Hope in a Hopeless World (Pops Staples/Phil Roy/Bob Thiele Jr.) – 5:29
3. Disco (Widespread Panic) – 6:16
4. Diner (Widespread Panic) – 19:03
5. Arleen (Winston Riley) – 9:24

=== Disc 3 ===
1. Drums (Widespread Panic) – 17:17
2. Pilgrims (Widespread Panic) – 8:20
3. B of D (Widespread Panic) – 3:50
4. Raise The Roof (Widespread Panic) – 4:56
5. Last Dance (Neil Young) – 7:25
6. Makes Sense To Me (Hutchens) – 5:20

== Personnel ==
- John Bell – Vocals, Guitar
- Michael Houser – Guitar, Vocals
- Dave Schools – Bass
- Todd Nance – Drums
- John "JoJo" Hermann – Keyboards, Vocals
- Domingo "Sunny" Ortiz – Percussion
