= History Lesson New Years 1997 =

Live album by Widespread Panic
- Released: December 13, 2011
- Recorded: December 31, 1997
- Genre: Rock, Southern rock, jam
- Label: Widespread Records

Widespread Panic chronology
Colorado Springs 1998 (2011)	History Lesson New Years 1997 (2011)	Oak Mountain 2001 – Night 1 (2013)

History Lesson New Years 1997 is the seventh Archive release by Athens, Georgia's Widespread Panic. The performance was recorded live at the Fox Theater in Atlanta, Georgia on December 31, 1997. The multi-track recordings featured all original band members including late guitarist Michael Houser.

== Track listing ==
=== Disc 1 ===
1. "Coconut" (Widespread Panic) - 7:16
2. "Let's Get This Show On The Road" (Michael Stanley) - 6:01
3. "Wish You Were Here (David Gilmour, Roger Waters)" - 4:45
4. "Stop-Go" (Widespread Panic) - 6:39
5. "Travelin' Light" (J.J. Cale) - 7:17
6. "Ophelia" (Robbie Robertson) - 4:34
7. "Junior" (Kimbrough, Spring) - 5:14

== Personnel ==
=== Widespread Panic ===
- John "JB" Bell - Vocals, Guitar
- Michael Houser - Guitar, Vocals
- David Schools - Bass, Vocals
- John "JoJo" Hermann - Keyboards, Vocals
- Todd Nance - Drums
- Domingo "Sunny" Ortiz - Percussion

=== Staff ===
- Mixed and Mastered by Drew Vandenberg at Chase Park Transduction Studios in Athens, GA.
- Recorded by Danny Friedman
- Packaging by Chris Bilheimer
- Set List by Garrie Vereen
- Photos by Thomas G. Smith
