= Change in the Weather =

Change in the Weather or A Change in the Weather may refer to:

== Video games ==
- A Change in the Weather, an interactive fiction video game for the Z-machine developed by Andrew Plotkin

== Albums ==
- Change in the Weather, an album by Cory Pesaturo
- Change in the Weather, an album by Eric Lindell
- Change in the Weather, an album by Gregson & Collister
- Change in the Weather, an album by Janiva Magness
- Change in the Weather, an album by the Mission Mountain Wood Band
- A Change in the Weather, an album by Bliss
- A Change in the Weather, an album by Steve LaSpina
- A Change in the Weather, an album by Trapper Schoepp
- No Change in the Weather, an album by Pulley

== Songs ==
- "Change in the Weather", a song by the Beths from Expert in a Dying Field
- "Change in the Weather", a song by the Concretes from In Colour
- "Change in the Weather", a song by John Fogerty from Eye of the Zombie
- "Change in the Weather", a song by Love Spit Love from Love Spit Love
- "Change in the Weather", a song by Michael Houser from Midnight Moonlight
- "Change in the Weather", a song by Steve Forbert from The American in Me
- "Change in the Weather", a song by Tesla from Psychotic Supper
- "A Change in the Weather", a song by Allen Clapp
- "A Change in the Weather", a song by Harold Budd and John Foxx from Translucence/Drift Music
- "A Change in the Weather", a song by New Riders of the Purple Sage from Door Harp
- "Big Change in the Weather", a song by Gerry Rafferty from the single "Baker Street"
- "There's a Change in the Weather", a song by the Kinks from Preservation Act 1

== Other uses ==
- Change in the Weather: Life after Stroke, a book by Mark McEwen
- A Change in the Weather, a book by Ron Kolm
- A Change in the Weather, a play by Katherine Thomson
- "A Change in the Weather", an episode of the television series ChuckleVision
- No Change in the Weather, a musical by Berni Stapleton
