= Kudzu Kings =

American jam band

- Origin: Oxford, Mississippi, United States
- Genres: Alternative country, roots rock
- Years active: 1994–present
- Members: Tate Moore; Dave Woolworth; Robert Chaffe; George McConnell; Max Williams; Chuck Sigler
- Past members: Tommy Bryan Ledford; Daniel Karlish; Ted Gainey; Jefferson E. Colburn; Chris Louviere; C.D. Overton

Kudzu Kings is an alternative country/roots rock jam band from Oxford, Mississippi. Their first two albums were the self-titled Kudzu Kings, followed by Y2Kow, released in 1999. Their sound has been categorized as a blend of country music, bluegrass and improvisational rock & roll.

== History ==
The band was actively together and toured aggressively for almost ten years (1994–2003).

Subsequently, Kudzu Kings played regularly in the Southeast for festivals, benefits, obscure astrological events, or big paychecks to tamper with their unique chemistry. In addition, members worked on various projects, both solo and with other Kudzu members. Some current projects the Kings have sired are Pithecanfunkus Erectus, Tate Moore and the Cosmic Door, Effie Burt Band, Hemptones, Sparkle Pants, Blackbird Hour, and Rocket 88.

In their touring years together, the band garnered substantial success in the Southeast, Colorado, and Texas, in addition to spreading their base to the rest of the nation and Canada with a number of tours. They have shared the stage many times with Widespread Panic (with whom longtime Kudzu guitarist George McConnell eventually joined up with in 2002), as well as with many other artists, including Bob Weir and Rob Wasserman, Leftover Salmon, Jimmie Dale Gilmore and Junior Brown, just to name a few. Kudzu Kings have also welcomed a number of guest musicians to collaborate over the years (sometimes sitting in for several shows for absent members) including Chris Ethridge, Bucky Baxter, John "Jojo" Hermann (of Widespread Panic), Cody Dickinson (of North Mississippi All-Stars), and Tony Furtado.

== Band members ==
Members include (but not limited to):

Current Members

- Tate Moore – acoustic guitars, vocals
- Dave Woolworth – bass, baroque doghouse, vocals
- Robert Chaffe – keyboards
- George McConnell (1995–2001; 2014 –) – acoustic and electric guitars, vocals
- Max Williams (1994–1997; 2004 –) – electric and acoustic guitars, vocals
- Chuck Sigler (1994-2000;2018 -) funk and western drums, vocals

Former Members

- Tommy Bryan Ledford (1997–2003) – banjo, mandolin, vocals
- Daniel Karlish (2001–2003) – electric & slide guitar, vocals
- Ted Gainey (1999-2000, numerous occasions and extended stays including 2014 -) – drums
- Chris "Wolfy" Louviere (1999-2000) – drums
- Jefferson E. Colburn (2000–2003) – drums
- CD Overton (2003-2014) – drums

Sometimes with:

- JJ Callaway – trombone
- Cary Hudson (Blue Mountain) – guitar

== Discography ==
=== Kudzu Kings (1997) ===
- Produced by Jim Gaines and engineered by Jeffrey Reed
- AllMusic review
- OffBeat review

=== Y2Kow (1999) ===
- Produced and engineered by Jeffrey Reed
- CMJ (5/8/00, p. 32) – "...a winning blend of roots rock, traditional country and Delta blues."

=== True Tales From The Bike Race (2022) ===
- Double LP. Recorded live in Ridgeland, Mississippi October 15, 2016 at Madison Bicycle Club Race.
