= Geneva, MN 2001 =

Geneva, MN

Live album by Widespread Panic
- Released: November 18, 2011
- Recorded: July 4, 2001
- Genre: Rock, southern rock, jam
- Label: Widespread Records

Geneva, MN is a live release by Athens, Georgia's Widespread Panic. These performances were recorded live at Harmony Park Music Garden in Geneva, MN on July 4, 2001. This recording features all original band members including late guitarist Michael Houser.

== Track listing ==
=== July 4, 2001 ===
==== Disc 1 ====
1. Henry Parsons Died (Daniel Hutchens / Eric Carter) - 7:38
2. Who Do You Belong To? (Daniel Hutchens / Eric Carter) - 6:07
3. Jack (Widespread Panic) - 7:29
4. The Waker (Widespread Panic) - 7:21
5. C. Brown (Widespread Panic) - 5:41
6. Tie Your Shoes (Widespread Panic) - 10:33
7. Good Morning Little Schoolgirl (H.R. Demarais/D. Level/B. Love/Sonny Boy Williamson II) - 7:23
8. 1 x 1 (John Hermann) - 4:57
9. Conrad (Widespread Panic) - 8:42

==== Disc 2 ====
1. Happy (Widespread Panic) - 9:18
2. Dyin' Man (Widespread Panic) - 5:17
3. Airplane (Widespread Panic) - 13:32
4. Holden Oversoul (Widespread Panic) - 9:45
5. Better Off (T Lavitz / Widespread Panic) - 5:49
6. One Kind Favor (Son House) - 16:17

==== Disc 3 ====
1. Drums (Widespread Panic) - 14:28
2. Geneva Jam (Widespread Panic) - 7:04
3. Four Cornered Room (War) - 3:44
4. Heathen (Widespread Panic) - 6:06
5. Four Cornered Room (War) - 2:57
6. This Part of Town (Widespread Panic) - 5:19
7. Fishwater (Widespread Panic) - 10:30

Encore

1. Old Joe (Widespread Panic) - 3:34
2. Red Beans (Muddy Waters) - 4:28

== Personnel ==
=== Widespread Panic ===
- John Bell - Vocals, Guitar
- Michael Houser - Guitar, Vocals
- Dave Schools - Bass
- Todd Nance - Drums
- John "JoJo" Hermann - Keyboards, Vocals
- Domingo "Sunny" Ortiz - Percussion

=== Staff ===
- Recorded by Andy Meyer
- Post Production by Micah Gordan
