= Live from Austin, TX =

Live from Austin, TX may refer to:

- Live from Austin, TX (David Byrne album)
- Live from Austin, TX (Neko Case album)
- Live from Austin, TX (Johnny Cash album)
- Live from Austin, TX (Guy Clark album)
- Live from Austin, TX (Drive-By Truckers album)
- Live from Austin, TX (Steve Earle album)
- Live from Austin, TX (Guided by Voices album)
- Live from Austin, TX (John Hiatt album)
- Live from Austin, TX (Waylon Jennings album)
- Live from Austin, TX (Eric Johnson album)
- Live from Austin, TX (Norah Jones DVD)
- Live from Austin, TX (John Mayall album)
- Live from Austin, TX (Tift Merritt DVD)
- Live from Austin (Ian Moore album)
- Live from Austin, TX (Susan Tedeschi album)
- Live from Austin, TX (Richard Thompson album)
- Live from Austin, Texas (Stevie Ray Vaughan video)
- Live from Austin Texas (Widespread Panic album)
- Live in Austin, TX (The Black Keys album)
- Live in Austin, TX (ProjeKct Three album)
- Live from Austin (EP), a 2000 EP by Tara MacLean
- Live from Austin Music Hall, a 2005 album by Chris Tomlin
- Live at Austin City Limits, a 2001 album by Roy Orbison
- Live from Austin, TX (R.E.M. video album), 2010
