= Live at the Fillmore Auditorium =

Live at the Fillmore Auditorium may refer to:

- Live at the Fillmore Auditorium (Chuck Berry album)
- Live at the Fillmore Auditorium (Widespread Panic video)
