= Live from Austin, TX (Widespread Panic album) =

Video by Widespread Panic
- Released: October 22, 2008
- Genre: Rock, Southern rock, Jam
- Length: 79 minutes
- Label: New West Records; Widespread Records (2008)
- Producer: Terry Lickona; Gary Briggs; Cameron Strang

Live from Austin, TX is a performance by Athens, Georgia's Widespread Panic that came from the Austin City Limits vaults. The DVD is part of the Austin City Limits concert series that features previously unreleased performances from the television show. The finished product is limited selection of eleven songs that have been re-mixed and remastered in stereo and 5.1 surround sound. The original performance was recorded on October 31, 2000.

== Track listing ==
1. "Let's Get Down to Business" (Vic Chesnutt)
2. "Ain't Life Grand" (Widespread Panic)
3. "Space Wrangler" (Widespread Panic)
4. "Climb to Safety" (Jerry Joseph and Glen Esparza)
5. "Blue Indian" (Widespread Panic)
6. "Casa Del Grillo" (Widespread Panic)
7. "Driving Song > Surprise Valley > Driving Song" (Widespread Panic)
8. "Travelin' Light" (J.J. Cale)
9. "Bear's Gone Fishin'" (Widespread Panic)
10. "Dyin' Man" (Widespread Panic)
11. "Porch Song" (Widespread Panic)

== Personnel ==
=== Widespread Panic ===
- John "JB" Bell - Vocals, Guitar
- Michael Houser - Guitar, Vocals
- David Schools - Bass, Vocals
- John "JoJo" Hermann - Keyboards, Vocals
- Todd Nance - Drums
- Domingo "Sunny" Ortiz - Percussion

=== Management ===
- Sam Lanier at Brown Cat, Inc./Buck Williams at PGA Management

=== Original Austin City Limits Production ===
- Producer - Terry Lickona
- Associate Producers - Jeff Peterson, Susan Caldwell and Leslie Nichols
- Director - Gary Menotti
- Audio Engineers - David Hough and Billy Lee Myers, Jr.
- Photography - Scott Newton
- Executive Producer - Dick Peterson
- A Production of KLRU-TV Copyright October 31, 2000 KLRU-TV, Austin, TX

=== New West Records DVD Production ===
- Producer - Gary Briggs and Cameron Strang
- Associate Producer - Clare Surgeson
- Mixed By - Chet Himes and Gary Briggs at ASM Studios
- Audio Mastering - Jerry Tubb at Terra Nova Digital Audio
- Package Design - Paul Moore
- Business Affairs - David Lessoff
- Project Coordinator - Mary Jurey
- New West Intro Design - Victoria De La Paz
- Post Producers - George O'Dwyer, Donnie Knutson and Stuart Mydlow
- Editor - Justin Barclay
- eQ Finish Artist - Jim Reed
- Menu Design - Jeff Orgill
- DVD Authoring - 501 Post
- Engineer - Mark Tullos
