= Live at BJCC Arena =

Live at the BJCC Arena

Video by Widespread Panic
- Released: April 16, 2011
- Recorded: April 15, 2011
- Genre: Southern rock, jam band
- Label: Widespread Records
- Producer: LiveJam HD

Live at the BJCC Arena is a live DVD by American rock band Widespread Panic. The album and accompanying film were recorded in Birmingham, Alabama on April 15, 2011.

== Track listing ==
=== Disc One ===
1. Pigeons
2. North
3. Hatfield
4. Riders On The Storm
5. Bust It Big
6. Walk On The Flood
7. Saint Ex
8. Blackout Blues
9. Feelin' Alright

=== Disc Two ===
1. Little Kin
2. Strange Times
3. Proving Ground
4. Big Wooly Mammoth
5. Drums
6. Mercy
7. Proving Ground
8. Blight
9. Driving Song
10. Disco
11. Driving Song
12. Holden Oversoul
13. Expiration Day
14. Wondering
15. Porch

== Personnel ==
- John Bell
- John "JoJo" Hermann
- Jimmy Herring
- Todd Nance
- Domingo S. Ortiz
- Dave Schools
