= Co-Balt =

Studio album by brute.
- Released: April 9, 2002
- Recorded: Fall 2001
- Genre: Rock, Southern rock, jam
- Label: Widespread Records (US); Evangeline Records (UK)
- Producer: John Keane

Brute. chronology
Nine High a Pallet (1995)	Co-Balt (2002)

Professional ratings
Review scores
Source	Rating
AllMusic	3/5 stars
The Austin Chronicle	2.5/4 stars
The Encyclopedia of Popular Music	3/5 stars
Pitchfork	5.9/10

Co-Balt is the second and final studio album by the Athens, Georgia-based band brute., a collaboration between guitarist Vic Chesnutt and the members of Widespread Panic. It was released seven years after the band's debut release, Nine High a Pallet, on April 9, 2002. The night of the release, the band played their final live concert (though they would play a radio show a few weeks later) at the Tabernacle in Atlanta, Georgia.

== Track listing ==
1. "You Got It All Wrong" – 2:51
2. "Expiration Day" – 4:32
3. "Adirondacks" – 4:10
4. "You're With Me Now" – 3:35
5. "Scholarship" – 4:28
6. "Cutty Sark" – 3:36
7. "Morally Challenged" – 4:36
8. "No Thanks" – 4:24
9. "Puppy Sleeps" (Chesnutt, Schools) – 3:44
10. "All Kinds" – 5:31
11. "Cobalt Blue" – 8:59

All tracks by Vic Chesnutt unless otherwise noted.

== Personnel ==
brute.

- Vic Chesnutt – guitar, vocals, harmonica, keyboards, cover design
- John Bell – dobro, vocals
- Michael Houser – guitar
- Todd Nance – drums, vocals
- Dave Schools – bass
- John Hermann – organ, piano
- Domingo S. Ortiz – percussion

Guest performer

- John Keane – pedal steel, guitar (acoustic, electric), vocals

Production

- John Keane – engineer, producer, mixer
- Chris Byron – assistant
- Billy Field – assistant
- Glenn Schick – mastering
- Scott Sosebee – layout design
