= Colorado Springs 1998 =

Live album by Widespread Panic
- Released: June 28, 2011
- Recorded: October 20, 1998
- Genre: Rock, southern rock, jam band
- Label: Widespread

Widespread Panic chronology
Johnson City 2001 (2010)	Colorado Springs 1998 (2011)	History Lesson New Years 1997 (2011)

Colorado Springs 1998 is a complete concert released on CD on June 28, 2011 by American rock group Widespread Panic. The performance was recorded live at the City Auditorium Arena in Colorado Springs, Colorado on October 20, 1998. The multi-track recordings featured all original band members including late guitarist Michael Houser.

== Track listing ==
=== Disc 1 ===
1. "Goin' Out West" (Kathleen Brennan / Tom Waits) - 6:17
2. "Radio Child" (Widespread Panic) - 5:31
3. "Ride Me High" (J.J. Cale) - 10:06
4. "Disco" (Widespread Panic) - 4:43
5. "Airplane" (Widespread Panic) - 10:57
6. "C. Brown" (Widespread Panic) - 7:30
7. "Holden Oversoul" (Widespread Panic) - 7:30
8. "Sleepy Monkey" (Widespread Panic) - 7:17
9. "Postcard" (Widespread Panic) - 4:41

=== Disc 2 ===
1. "Climb to Safety" (Jerry Joseph/Glen Esparaza) - 7:20
2. "Tall Boy" (Widespread Panic) - 7:11
3. "Walk On" (Neil Young) - 5:47
4. "Nobody's Loss" (Widespread Panic) - 6:12
5. "Blight" (Vic Chesnutt / Michael Houser / Todd Nance / Dave Schools) - 5:56
6. "Chilly Water" (Widespread Panic) - 7:33
7. "Impossible" (Widespread Panic) - 13:45

=== Disc 3 ===
1. "Drums" (Widespread Panic) - 15:02
2. "Big Wooly Mammoth" (Widespread Panic) - 6:19
3. "Chilly Water (Reprise)" (Widespread Panic) - 4:55
4. "End of the Show" (Daniel Hutchens / Eric Carter)- 5:14
5. "Ain't Life Grand" (Widespread Panic) - 5:02

== Personnel ==
=== Widespread Panic ===
- John Bell - Vocals, Guitar
- Michael Houser - Guitar, Vocals
- Dave Schools - Bass
- Todd Nance - Drums
- John "Jojo" Hermann - Keyboards, Vocals
- Domingo "Sunny" Ortiz - Percussion

=== Personnel ===
- Mixed by Chris Rabold and Drew Vandenberg at Chase Park Transduction Studios in Athens, GA.
- Recorded by Danny Friedman
- Packaging by Chris Bilheimer
