= Milwaukee, WI 1996 =

Live album by Widespread Panic
- Released: March 14, 2010
- Recorded: November 1, 1996
- Genre: Rock, southern rock, jam
- Label: Widespread Records

Milwaukee, WI 1996 is a complete concert live album by Athens, Georgia's Widespread Panic. This show is the fourth release from Widespread Panic's Porch Songs project. This performance was recorded live at Modjeska Theatre in Milwaukee, Wisconsin on November 1, 1996. The two-track soundboard recording features all original band members including late guitarist Michael Houser.

This was the first time the band covered Sick and Tired or Shake, Rattle and Roll.

== Track listing ==
=== Disc 1 ===
1. "Sleepy Monkey" (Widespread Panic)- 7:50
2. "Makes Sense to Me" (Hutchens, Carter)- 4:22
3. "Gradle" (Widespread Panic)- 4:48
4. "Just Kissed My Baby" (George Porter Jr., Leo Nocentelli, Art Neville, Ziggy Modeliste)- 11:33
5. "Smoke and Burn" (Michael Houser)- 3:26
6. "Happy" (Widespread Panic)- 4:44
7. "Wondering" (Widespread Panic)- 3:42
8. "Sick & Tired/Shake, Rattle and Roll" (Chris Kenner, Dave Bartholomew/Charles E. Calhoun)- 6:19
9. "Contentment Blues" (Widespread Panic)- 5:41
10. "Love Tractor" (Widespread Panic)- 5:49

=== Disc 2 ===
1. "Airplane" (Widespread Panic)- 10:34
2. "Aunt Avis" (Vic Chesnutt)- 8:47
3. "B of D" (Widespread Panic)- 3:25
4. "Jack" (Widespread Panic)- 7:11
5. "Dear Mr. Fantasy" (Capaldi, Windwood) - 6:39

=== Disc 3 ===
1. "I Walk on Guilded Splinters" (Rebbenack)- 7:02
2. "Drums" (Widespread Panic)- 9:11
3. "I Walk on Guilded Splinters" (Rebbenack)- 5:29
4. "Diner" (Widespread Panic)- 14:41
5. "Tall Boy" (Widespread Panic)- 5:50
6. "And It Stoned Me" (Van Morrison) (Encore)- 5:39
7. "Red Beans" (Muddy Waters) (Encore)- 4:29

== Personnel ==
=== Widespread Panic ===
- John "JB" Bell - Vocals, Guitar
- Michael Houser - Guitar, Vocals
- Dave Schools - Bass
- Todd Nance - Drums
- John "Jojo" Hermann - Keyboards, Vocals
- Domingo "Sunny" Ortiz - Percussion
