= Oak Mountain 2001 – Night 1 =

Live album by Widespread Panic
- Released: May 28, 2013
- Recorded: July 27, 2001
- Genre: Rock, Southern rock, jam
- Label: Widespread Records

Widespread Panic chronology
History Lesson New Years 1997 (2011)	Oak Mountain 2001 – Night 1 (2013)	Oak Mountain 2001 – Night 2 (2013)

Oak Mountain 2001 – Night 1 is a live album by Athens, Georgia's Widespread Panic. This album features a multi-track recording of a performance by the band at Oak Mountain Amphitheater in Pelham, Alabama from 2001. The 3-disc set is the eighth multi-track release from the Widespread Panic Archives. The performance was recorded live on July 27, 2001. The album was released online and in local independent record stores on May 28, 2013 and is available on CD or as a digital download. The album features the six original members of the band: John Bell, John “JoJo” Hermann, Todd Nance, Domingo “Sunny” Ortiz, Dave Schools, and the late guitarist Michael Houser.

From 1990 – 2002, Widespread Panic and their fans held an annual gathering at the amphitheatre. Oak Mountain Amphitheatre has set the Widespread Panic record for the most total consecutive years playing at the same venue at 13.

The Widespread Panic Archives are planning to re-master yet another 2001 performance from Oak Mountain Amphitheatre for its next multi-track release project. The live album, Oak Mountain 2001 – Night 2, was originally recorded on July 28, 2001. That album will be the second night of Widespread Panic's three-night run at the Oak Mountain Amphitheatre in 2001 to be released as a multi-track recording by the Widespread Panic Archives.

== Track listing ==
=== Disc 1 ===
1. "Conrad" (Widespread Panic) – 8:37
2. "One Arm Steve" (Widespread Panic) – 3:13
3. "Barstools and Dreamers" (Widespread Panic) – 10:08
4. "Action Man" (Widespread Panic) – 4:14
5. "This Part of Town" (Widespread Panic) – 5:15
6. "Greta" (Widespread Panic) – 11:29
7. "Christmas Katie" (Widespread Panic) – 7:05
8. "Let It Rock" (Chuck Berry) – 7:10
9. "Radio Child" (Widespread Panic) – 5:54

=== Disc 2 ===
1. "Disco" (Widespread Panic) – 5:37
2. "Bear’s Gone Fishin’" (Widespread Panic) – 10:36
3. "Driving Song > Blight" (Widespread Panic) & (Schools/Houser/T. Nance/Chesnutt) – 14:55
4. "The Waker" (Widespread Panic) – 3:43
5. "Last Dance" (Young) – 7:42
6. "The Harder They Come" (Cliff) – 10:30
7. "Drums" (Widespread Panic) – 25:20

=== Disc 3 ===
1. "Fixin’ To Die" (White) – 5:13
2. "Low Rider" (War) – 6:59
3. "Love Tractor" (Widespread Panic) – 5:42
4. "Ride Me High" (Cale) – 7:36
5. "Dream Song" (Widespread Panic) – 5:17

== Personnel ==
=== Widespread Panic ===
- John Bell - Vocals, Guitar
- Michael Houser - Guitar, Vocals
- Dave Schools - Bass, Vocals
- Todd Nance - Drums
- John "Jojo" Hermann - Keyboards, Vocals
- Domingo "Sunny" Ortiz - Percussion

=== Guest performers ===
- Dr. Arvin Scott - Percussion

=== Others ===
- Packaging by Chris Bilheimer
