= Nine High a Pallet =

Studio album by brute.
- Released: September 12, 1995
- Recorded: December 1993
- Genres: Rock, Southern rock, jam
- Labels: Capricorn (1995); Velocette (2002)
- Producer: Scott Stuckey

Brute. chronology
Nine High a Pallet (1995)	Co-Balt (2002)

Professional ratings
Review scores
Source	Rating
AllMusic	3/5 stars
Entertainment Weekly	A−
The Rolling Stone Album Guide	2/5 stars
The Village Voice	A−

Nine High a Pallet is the first studio album by brute., a band based in Athens, Georgia, USA, which was a collaboration band between the guitarist Vic Chesnutt and members of Widespread Panic. The album was recorded at John Keane (record producer)'s studio in Athens, Georgia.

The liner notes to the album suggest that the band's name originated from a comment from Dave Schools who reportedly stated, "Play like a brute."

The liner notes also suggest that the album title derives from the safe stacking height for pallets.

The band Brute played 5 shows under that moniker, and Vic would collaborate with the band several more times before his death.

Several brute. songs have been covered by Widespread Panic over the years since Vic's death, including "Blight", "Protein Drink/Sewing Machine" and "Bastards in Bubbles."

== Track listing ==
All songs written by Vic Chesnutt, except as shown.

1. "Westport Ferry" – 2:56
2. "Blight" (Chesnutt, Houser, Nance, Schools) – 4:07
3. "Good Morning Mr. Hard on" – 3:46
4. "I Ain't Crazy Enough" - 4:44
5. "Protein Drink/Sewing Machine" ("Sewing Machine" co-written by Tina Chesnutt) - 9:09
6. "Let's Get Down to Business" - 3:09
7. "George Wallace" - 2:52
8. "PC" - 1:45
9. "Snowblind" (Hoyt Axton) - 2:23
10. "Miserable" - 2:21
11. "Bastards in Bubbles" - 3:46
12. "Cataclysm" – 8:36

== Personnel ==
brute.
Vic Chesnutt – guitar, vocals, harmonica
John Bell – dobro, vocals
Michael Houser – guitar, vocals
Todd Nance – percussion, drums, vocals
Dave Schools – bass guitar, percussion, vocals
John Hermann – keyboards
Guest performers
John Hickman – harp ("Cataclysm" only)
John Keane – pedal steel guitar ("Snowblind" only)
David Lowery – guitar ("Cataclysm" only)
Production
John Keane – engineer
Scott Stuckey – producer, engineer, mixing, remastering
Don Zientara – mixing
