= Wilmington, DE 2001 =

Live album by Widespread Panic
- Released: February 23, 2010
- Recorded: July 22, 2001
- Genre: Rock, southern rock, jam
- Label: Widespread Records

Wilmington, DE 2001 is a live album released by the band Widespread Panic on February 23, 2010. It was recorded live at Kahuna Summer Stage in Wilmington, Delaware on July 22, 2001, and was released as a two-track, sound board recording for the band's project, "Porch Songs". This performance serves as the third installment of the project.

The performance marked the first time the Bob Dylan/Jimi Hendrix classic All Along the Watchtower was performed live by the band.

== Track listing ==
=== Disc 1 ===
1. Glory (Widespread Panic) - 5:35
2. C. Brown (Widespread Panic) - 5:51
3. Give (Widespread Panic) - 4:41
4. Diner (Widespread Panic) - 13:39
5. Rebirtha (Widespread Panic) - 7:47
6. Blackout Blues (Widespread Panic) - 7:28
7. E on a G (Widespread Panic) - 3:43
8. Dirty Business (John Dawson) - 9:36
9. All Time Low (Widespread Panic) - 4:17

=== Disc 2 ===
1. Swamp (David Byrne / Chris Frantz / Jerry Harrison / Tina Weymouth) - 6:30
2. 1 x 1 (John Hermann) - 5:37
3. Sleepy Monkey (Widespread Panic) - 10:02
4. Stop Breakin' Down Blues (Robert Johnson) - 6:44
5. Party At Your Mama's House (Widespread Panic) - 7:19
6. Red Hot Mama (George Clinton/Eddie Hazel/Bernie Worrell) - 12:48
7. Drums (Widespread Panic) - 20:33

=== Disc 3 ===
1. The Last Straw (Widespread Panic) - 7:17
2. All Along the Watchtower (Bob Dylan) - 5:59
3. Travelin' Light (J.J. Cale) - 7:08
4. Old Joe (Widespread Panic) (Encore)- 3:47
5. North (Jerry Joseph) (Encore)- 6:22

== Personnel ==
- John "JB" Bell - Vocals, Guitar
- Michael Houser - Guitar, Vocals
- Dave Schools - Bass
- Todd Nance - Drums
- John "Jojo" Hermann - Keyboards, Vocals
- Domingo "Sunny" Ortiz - Percussion
