= Defector (John Hermann album) =

Studio album by John Hermann
- Released: February 11, 2003
- Genre: Rock, southern rock
- Length: 38:45
- Label: Fat Possum Records
- Producer: John Hermann

John Hermann chronology
Smiling Assassin (2001)	Defector (2003)	Just Ain't Right (2004)

Defector is the second solo album by Widespread Panic keyboardist John Hermann, released in 2003.

== Track listing ==
All tracks written by John Hermann except where noted.

1. "Mrs. Brown" 3:39
2. "I'll Get Around to It" 3:50
3. "Smoking Factory" 2:43
4. "And You Wonder Why" 4:02
5. "Step on Over Me" 3:32
6. "The True Blood Assembly of Ravensville" 3:44
7. "Annie Stay" 2:09
8. "When It's My Time" 4:30
9. "Aim to Speed" 2:53
10. "Gonna Get a Ride" 4:03
11. "Let It All Go" (David Andrews) 3:40

== Personnel ==
=== Musicians ===
- John Hermann – guitar, keyboards, vocals
- George McConnell – guitar
- Luther Dickinson – guitar
- Cody Dickinson – drums
- Kenny Brown – guitar
- Bruce Watson – guitar
- Cedric Burnside – drums
- Paul Edwards – bass
- Glen Duncan – mandolin, violin

=== Production ===
- John Hermann – producer
- John Keane – mixing
- Mark Yoshida – mastering
- Rusty McFarland – engineer, mixing
- Ben Strano – engineer, mixing
- Dustin Mitchell – engineer
- Joey Turner – engineer
- Bruce Watson – engineer
- Derek Hess – cover art
- Brandon "Wundabred" Seavers – layout design
