= Brute (band) =

Rock and jam band (1995–2002)

brute.
- Origin: Atlanta
- Genres: Rock, Southern rock, jam band
- Years active: 1995–2002
- Labels: Widespread Records
- Members: Vic Chesnutt; David Schools; Michael Houser; John Hermann; Todd Nance; John Bell

Brute (stylized brute.) was a side project band by guitarist Vic Chesnutt and members of Widespread Panic.

== History ==
The first known grouping of Chesnutt with the members of the band was at John Keane's studio in Athens, Georgia. There, the collaboration recorded an album in early December 1993. The members of Widespread Panic that participated in Brute were David Schools on bass, Michael Houser on guitar, John Hermann on keys, Todd Nance on drums and John Bell on dobro and vocals.

The album recorded at Keane's studio was titled Nine High a Pallet. The band never formally toured in support of this album, which was released on September 12, 1995. Their first performance on stage was on January 18, 1995 at the Georgia Theater in Athens and their last was at the Tabernacle in Atlanta, Georgia on April 9, 2002. The band itself only performed an average of once per year, usually in the spring, in or around Atlanta. In total, the band played six shows between 1995 and 2002, not including one radio show in Asheville, North Carolina. In 2002, the band recorded a follow-up to their debut album, entitled Co-Balt.

On New Year's Eve of 2001/2002, Vic Chesnutt joined Widespread Panic for the entire first set of the show, playing Chesnutt songs that Widespread Panic covers, songs from Nine High a Pallet and debuting songs from the upcoming Co-Balt. On April 25, 2007, the third night of a three-night Widespread Panic run in Athens, Vic joined the band onstage to play the Brute song "Protein Drink/Sewing Machine". On February 12, 2016, Widespread Panic ended its show at Altria Theater in Richmond, Virginia with Protein Drink > Sewing Machine.

On December 25, 2009, Chesnutt died from an overdose of muscle relaxants.

== Discography ==
- Nine High a Pallet – Capricorn Records, 1995
- Co-Balt – Widespread Records, 2002
