= Beanland (band) =

Beanland was a roots rock jam band, based in Oxford, Mississippi, which performed and recorded primarily from 1986 to 1993.

Beanland was founded in Oxford in 1985 by guitarists Bill McCrory and George McConnell, with Adam Stoll on drums and harmonica. After some early shuffling, the band's line-up consisted of McConnell and McCrory on guitar, John "JoJo" Hermann on keyboards, Ron Lewis on bass, and Harry Peel on drums. The band recorded a self-titled debut album in 1991 and toured extensively, mainly around the South and Southwest, playing blues-oriented rock as part of the nascent early-1990s jam band renaissance.

Shortly after the album's release, keyboardist John "JoJo" Hermann left Beanland to join Widespread Panic. McConnell kept Beanland alive briefly as a four-piece with a much-altered line-up, and recorded a follow-up album in 1992, but the band dissolved soon after.

George McConnell later joined JoJo Hermann in Widespread Panic, serving as that band's lead guitarist from 2002-2006.

The Beanland songs "Sellin' The Rain" and "Doreatha" from the debut album garnered some airplay on college radio stations throughout the Southeastern United States. The band has a moderate cult following.

Beanland has played several reunion shows, most recently in 2004 at the Double Decker Arts Festival in Oxford.

2004 also saw the release of "Beanland: Rising From the Riverbed", a film by Oxford based Cloudscapes Productions. The film tells the story of Beanland through classic footage and interviews with band members and such musical luminaries as producer Jim Dickinson and Rev. Jeff Mosier.

Beanland took their name from a home where some of the members lived, 1313 Beanland Drive, Oxford, Mississippi. In fact, the original name of the band was 1313 Beanland, but the name was changed at the request or demand of their landlord.

== Discography ==
=== Beanland (1991) ===
- HiCool Records
- Produced by Jim Dickinson and engineered by Don Smith

=== Eye to Eye (1993) ===
- HiCool Records
- Produced and engineered by Don Smith

=== Rising From the Riverbed - DVD (2004) ===
- Cloudscapes Productions
- Produced and directed by Scotty Glahn
- (includes bonus CD sampler of bands from the era)
