= Bret Mosley =

American singer-songwriter

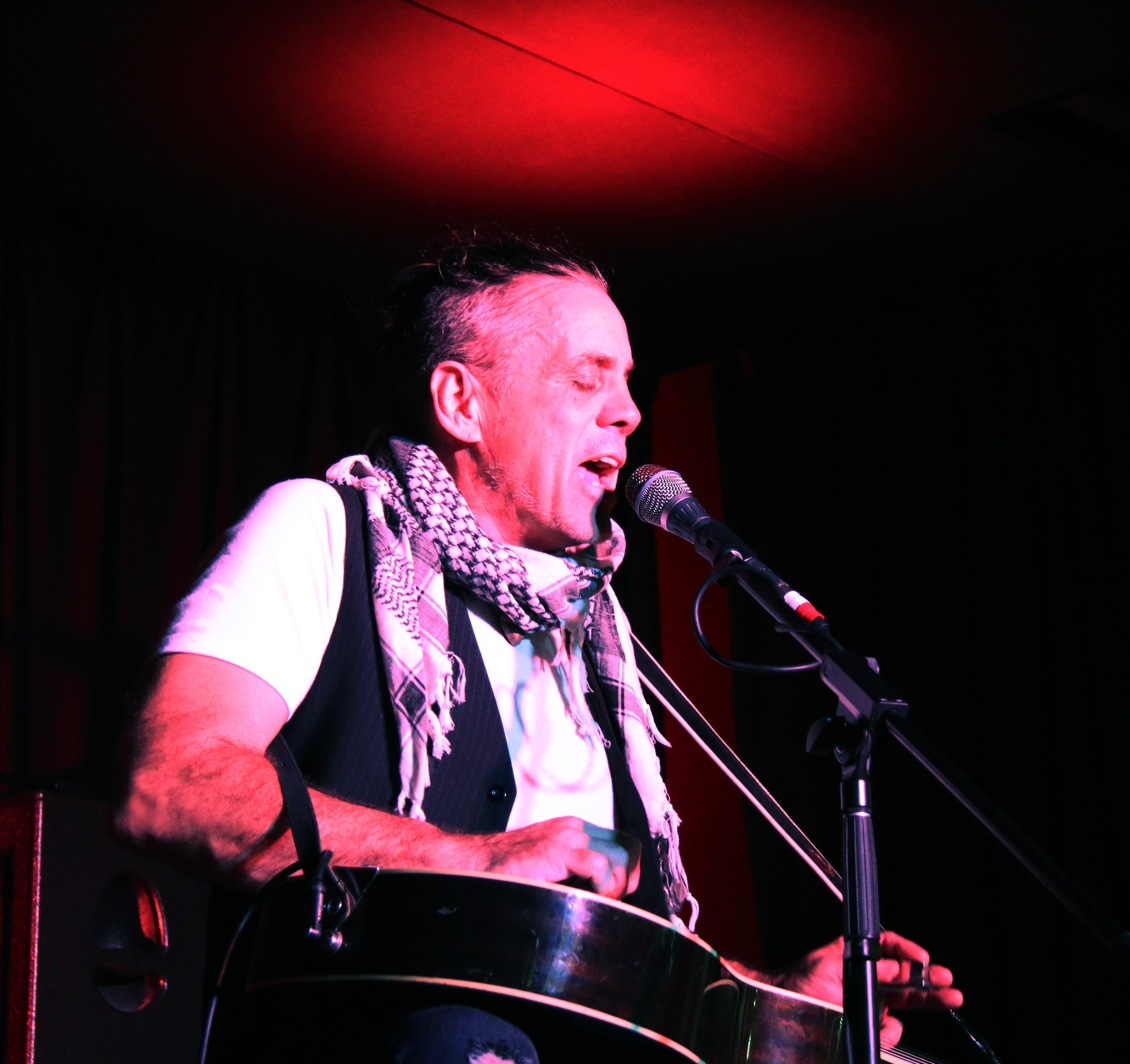
- Bret Mosley performing live in Perth, Western Australia in 2016.

Background information
- Born: Bret Mosley; July 28, 1961 (age 65); Alpine, Texas US
- Origin: Brooklyn, New York US
- Genres: Americana; Folk rock Alternative country Blues
- Occupation: Singer-songwriter
- Instruments: vocals lap dobro stomp box
- Years active: 1995–present
- Labels: Woodstock MusicWorks; Cosmo Sex School; Out Of The Park Records
- Website: bretmosley.com

Bret Mosley is an American singer-songwriter from Brooklyn, New York.

== Early life ==
Mosley was born in Alpine, Texas, the son of Elbert (Burt) Mosley, a Viet Nam veteran, ranch hand, and computer programmer; and Nancy Lee Mosley (née Gothard), a project manager. The family moved frequently throughout his early childhood and teen years—living in various towns in Texas, Arizona, New Mexico, Utah, Nebraska, Ohio, and Virginia. He attended numerous schools before completing high school in Texas via GED. Mosley then attended West Texas A&M University studying music theory, voice, piano, theatre, and ballet.

== Career ==
Mosley began playing guitar early in his childhood and grew up among an extended family of musicians. Following university and a brief ballet career, Mosley worked at Fidelity Investments for several years as a mid-level manager. Subsequently, he attended University of North Carolina School of the Arts, majoring in drama. Mosley then moved to New York City and pursued an acting career while developing as a musician and songwriter, first busking on the subway, then becoming active in the downtown Manhattan indie music scene playing frequently at Rockwood Music Hall, The Living Room, and Banjo Jim's.

While playing a house concert in Woodstock, New York in 2005, Mosley attracted the attention of Lisa Hantes, manager of the nearby Bearsville Theater at that time. With the support of Hantes, he opened at Bearsville for established acts such as The Blind Boys of Alabama, Ivan Neville's Dumpstaphunk, Big Brother and the Holding Company. This led to an opportunity to record at Woodstock producer/engineer Pete Caigan's Flymax Recording Studio where Mosley's debut album Light & Blood was recorded in 2007. The album was released on Woodstock MusicWorks. Well received critically, the album led to an increasingly busy touring schedule and Mosley's collaborations with singer-songwriter Jerry Joseph.

Mosley subsequently joined Joseph frequently on tour 2008–2014. In 2008, the two songwriters collaborated on the EP Charge—recorded live-to-tape at Old Soul Studios—joined by drummer Steve Drizos. The record was produced and mixed by Garrett Uhlenbrock, and released in 2009 on Cosmo Sex School.

Following the release of Charge, Mosley began touring extensively throughout the southeastern United States. In 2013, Mosley recorded the EP X-ING ("crossing") in Awendaw, South Carolina—where he began collaborating and touring with Awendaw Green artist-in-residence Danielle Howle. Howle appears on "Gun War" from Mosley's 2023 commemorative album release Light & Blood: 15th Anniversary Edition. The song was recorded at the solar-powered Swamp House studio managed by Howle. The song was co-written with 2022 Mississippi Songwriter of the Year, Zechariah Lloyd, who has toured extensively as a drummer with Mosley.

In 2014, Mosley emigrated from the U.S. to Australia, where he has since toured extensively.

In 2022, Mosley released Lighter & Bloodier: Early Rarities, a compilation of early demos, live performances, and previously unreleased songs. Mixed and mastered by Mosley, the retrospective album's 13 songs span from mid-2001 through 2010.

In 2023, Mosley released Through the Fire—recorded in Fremantle, Western Australia. Mosley self-produced the album and performed all the instrumentation.

In December 2024, Mosley released a live album, Live at Sam's Caravan—recorded at Majors Creek Festival in New South Wales, Australia.

Mosley has cited James Taylor, Chris Whitley, Son Volt, Ani Difranco, and the music of West Africa as significant influences.

== Performance style ==
Mosley most often performs solo, accompanying himself on a lap dobro resonator guitar and a modified Porchboard Bass stomp box. Mosley's sound—often described as a blending of distinct genres and styles—is noted for its raw soulfulness and authenticity.

== Personal life ==
Mosley has stated that his Through the Fire album was born out of trauma from an abusive relationship experience upon his arrival in Australia.

In March 2021, Mosley married Lee Robins, a shamanic and sound healing practitioner. They currently reside in Melbourne.

== Discography ==
Studio albums

- Light & Blood (Woodstock MusicWorks, 2007)
- Lighter & Bloodier: Early Rarities (compilation) (Out Of The Park Records, 2022)
- Light & Blood: 15th Anniversary Edition (Out Of The Park Records, 2023)
- Through the Fire (Out Of The Park Records, 2023)
- Live at Sam's Caravan (Out Of The Park Records, 2024)

EPs

- Charge—w/Jerry Joseph & Steve Drizos (EP) (Cosmo Sex School, 2009)
- X-ING (EP) (Out Of The Park Records, 2013)

Mosley also appears on the following:

- Open – Allison Dennis (2004)
