= George McConnell =

American Singer from Vicksburg, Mississippi

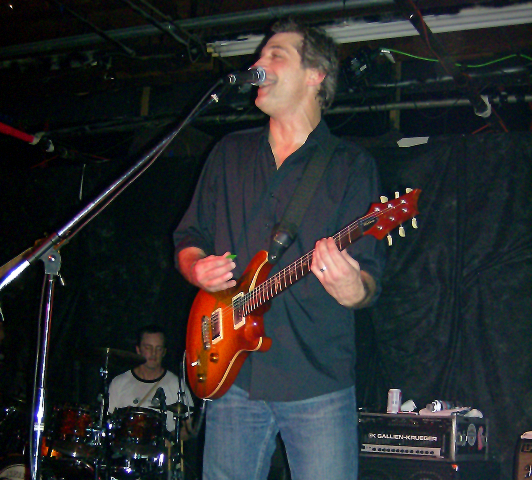
- McConnell performing at Hal n Mal's in Jackson, Mississippi in 2008

Background information
- Origin: Vicksburg, Mississippi, United States
- Genres: Southern rock, blues, blues rock, roots rock, country rock, jam rock, alternative rock
- Occupation: Musician
- Instruments: Vocals, guitar
- Years active: 1980s–present
- Website: http://www.georgemcconnell.com

George McConnell is an American singer from Vicksburg, Mississippi. He has played for the bands Widespread Panic, Kudzu Kings, and Beanland.

== History ==
George McConnell attended the University of Mississippi, where he was in the Sigma Alpha Epsilon fraternity.

In 1985, McConnell co-founded the band Beanland in Oxford, Mississippi with guitarist, Bill McCorry. After some early shuffling, the band's line-up comprised McConnell and McCrory on guitar, John Hermann on keyboards, Ron Lewis on bass, and Harry Peel on drums. The band recorded their self-titled debut album in 1991 and toured extensively around the south and southwest, playing blues-oriented rock as part of the nascent early 1990s Jam band renaissance.

McConnell went on to play for several years in the country rock band Kudzu Kings, eventually leaving to devote his time to opening a guitar store in Oxford Square in Oxford, Mississippi.

In 2002, following Widespread Panic guitarist Michael Houser's diagnosis of pancreatic cancer, McConnell and saxophone player Randall Bramblett were asked to accompany the band on their summer tour. Initially, McConnell sat in for a few songs per show to support Houser's playing, however, when Houser was unable to complete the tour, McConnell filled in as the lead guitarist. McConnell was named as the new lead guitarist in the band following Houser's death in August 2002.

McConnell served as Widespread Panic's lead guitarist from 2002 to 2006, recording two studio albums and three live albums with the band. His last show with the band was on July 30, 2006, in St. Louis, Missouri.

On March 27, 2014, McConnell was the subject of the Mississippi Public Broadcasting television show "Oxford Sounds" along with Mississippi heavy metal group, The Cooters. The TV show was broadcast statewide on public television. George McConnell & The Nonchalants played three songs on the show, including "A Thousand Things," "Must Not Mind," and the Beanland classic "Doretha," followed by an interview of McConnell by Cooters' frontman Newt Rayburn.

== Discography and videography ==
=== Beanland ===
- Beanland (1991, HiCool Records) Produced by Jim Dickinson and engineered by Don Smith
- Eye to Eye (1993, HiCool Records) Produced and engineered by Don Smith
- Rising From the Riverbed – DVD (2004, Cloudscapes Productions) Produced and directed by Scotty Glahn (includes bonus CD sampler of bands from the era)

=== Kudzu Kings ===
- Kudzu Kings (1997) Produced by Jim Gaines and engineered by Jeffrey Reed
- Y2Kow (1999) Produced and engineered by Jeffrey Reed

=== Widespread Panic ===
- Ball (2003)
- Night of Joy (2004)
- Über Cobra (2004)
- Jackassolantern (2004)
- Live at Myrtle Beach (2005)
- Earth to America (2006)
- Live From The Backyard (2003) (DVD)
- Earth to Atlanta (2006) (DVD)

=== George McConnell ===
- Singles Only (2009)
- Cheers, Sports Fans! (2013)
