= Spider and Web =

1998 video game

- Developer: Andrew Plotkin
- Publisher: Self-published
- Designer: Andrew Plotkin
- Engine: Z-machine
- Platform: Z-machine
- Release: 1998
- Genre: Interactive fiction
- Mode: Single-player

Spider and Web is a piece of interactive fiction written by Andrew Plotkin.

Spider and Web begins innocuously enough: the player's character, an apparent tourist, has wandered into a blind alley. Upon trying to leave the alley, however, the character is confronted by a voice sneering that this is a lie and threatening dire consequences if the truth is not told. Gradually, the player pieces together that the main character is an unnamed spy who is being interrogated by an equally anonymous enemy. Through interruptions and prodding, the interrogator reveals that the spy was captured in the process of infiltrating an installation under the guise of a tourist.

Most of the commands the player gives are actually part of a story the character is telling to the interrogator. Any part of the story that the interrogator disputes is challenged; the player is executed after a number of these "challenges". Thus, the player's main goal is to tell the captors a plausible story to explain what they already know (or more precisely, what they think they already know).

On June 24, 2014 the author released the source code for educational purposes.

== Reception ==
In the 1998 Xyzzy Awards, the game won the awards for Best Game, Best Individual NPC, Best Individual Puzzle, Best Use of Medium and Best Puzzles. It was also a finalist for Best Individual PC, Best Setting, Best Story and Best Writing. PC Gamer selected it as one of their "Top 100 Greatest Games" in 2015.
