= Sandbox (Michael Houser album) =

Studio album by Michael Houser
- Released: 2006
- Recorded: 2002
- Genre: Instrumental
- Label: Super Cat Records
- Producer: John Keane

Michael Houser chronology
Door Harp (2002)	Sandbox (2006)

Sandbox is the second studio album developed by Widespread Panic Lead Guitarist Michael Houser.

Released posthumously in 2006, 'Sandbox' is a collection of Houser originals Recorded at John Keane's Athens, GA studio in August 2002, shortly before his death from pancreatic cancer. In contrast to Door Harp, the tracks are mostly full-band rockers, several of which had been played by Widespread Panic in the past. Also unlike Door Harp, the songs are all accompanied by Houser's low-key vocals.

Most instruments are played by Houser and Keane, with the Widespread Panic percussion section of Todd Nance and Domingo S. Ortiz providing drums and percussion respectively. Lyrically, some of the new songs on the album share the theme of saying goodbye (Goodbye My Love, No Cryin' Now).

A two-song bonus CD with outtakes was included with the original release in 2006.

== Track listing ==
All songs written by Michael Houser

1. "No Matter What" – 6:33
2. "Goodbye My Love" – 4:36
3. "Sandbox" – 5:14
4. "Can't Change the Past" – 2:59
5. "Low Country" – 5:31
6. "Where Does It Go" – 5:20
7. "Nacoochee Queen" – 3:25
8. "Country Sex Song" – 4:53
9. "Solitude" – 5:00
10. "Bull Run" – 5:09
11. "No Cryin' Now" – 4:16
12. "She Drives Me to Drink" – 5:27

Bonus CD included with original release

1. "Smoke And Burn" – 4:08
2. "Song In My Heart" – 6:15
