= Jerry Joseph =

American singer-songwriter (born 1961)

- Born: April 19, 1961 (age 65); Los Angeles, California, U.S.
- Genres: Rock, pop, country, Americana
- Occupations: Musician, singer, songwriter
- Instrument: Guitar
- Years active: 1982–present
- Labels: Cosmo Sex School, Sanctuary, Terminus, OuterSpace, Cavity Search, Trespass, Holladay, Earth Pig, Back Door, Response, Capricorn
- Website: jerryjoseph.com

Jerry Joseph (born April 19, 1961) is an American singer, songwriter, and guitarist.

== Early life ==
Jerry Joseph was born on April 19, 1961, in Los Angeles, California. He is of Irish, Lebanese and Syrian ancestry and grew up in the San Diego area. In high school, he began experiencing trouble and was sent by his parents to a boarding school in New Zealand, where he started playing guitar professionally at age 15. While there, he experienced further problems with juvenile delinquency and was eventually deported back to the United States. He wound up in Arcata, California, where he has familial ties stretching back several generations.

== Little Women ==
Jerry Joseph formed the rock/reggae band Little Women in late 1981. One of the first incarnations of the band was formed in Logan, Utah. The band consisted of Brad Rosen on drums, Stefan Derby on bass, Eric Hellberg on keyboards and Jerry Joseph on guitar. The band featured several lead guitarists over the years, including Greg Millar (1983), Steve Smith (1989), Steve Kimock (1989) and Steven James Wright (1987). C. Louis Butts, Jr (1983 to 1992) replaced Darby on bass and percussionists Ernesto Pediango (1983) and Tony (1983) eventually played with the group.

Little Women's first self-released cassette, Life's Just Bitchin, was recorded in late 1986, early 1987 in near Pomona, CA and featured Joseph, Butts, Geoff George (1982 to 1992, keyboards, vocals), Gregg Freeman (1985 to 1989, percussion), and Brad Rosen (1981 to 1993, drums, vocals).

That was followed in 1990 with Pretty Wiped Out, the first release to feature the staple Chainsaw City, and featuring David Lindley, Ian McLagan and Steve Kimock.

Little Women released a single for the Wahine Records label in 1992 of Drive, with Milk on the b-side, as well as the live album, Live Radish Head. In 1993 the band released Live at New Georges containing the Jimmy Webb song, "Wichita Lineman". The live band line-up from this point (late 1992) onward consisted of Joseph, Steve James, Greg Williams/Danny Carbo (drums) and Glen Esparza (bass). In 2006, Joseph's Cosmo Sex School records re-released Live Radish Head.

They eventually signed to Capricorn Records but were ultimately dropped after recording what would become The Welcome Hunters in 1993.

== Solo career and the Jackmormons ==
After the breakup of Little Women in 1993, Joseph released The Welcome Hunters which was essentially a Little Women record with James, Esparza and Williams on drums. This was the first album to contain the hit Climb To Safety, a song often covered by the band Widespread Panic.

1994 brought the next Joseph solo record, Love and Happiness on Back Door Records and which featured an all-new lineup of musicians, including Dave Schools on bass. The record was recorded in Muscle Shoals, Alabama.

In 1996, Joseph moved to Utah and formed the band Jackmormons with bassist JR Ruppel, drummer Jim Bone and keyboard player Dave Pellicciaro. Their first album was Butte, Mont. 1879 in 1996, followed by Cotton in 1997. After a few personnel changes the band released Goodlandia and Salt Lake City. At this point, the band settled on a three-piece lineup of Joseph, Rosen and Ruppel. This lineup would remain for the Jackmormons for more than a decade, releasing Conscious Contact in 2001, featuring Chuck Leavell (organ, piano), Randall Bramblett (organ, wurlitzer), Michael Houser (guitar), Vic Chesnutt (backing vocals), John Keane (pedal steel), John Neff (pedal steel), Todd Nance (percussion) and David Barbe (sirens), and Mouthful of Copper in 2003. In 2005, the Jackmormons released Into the Lovely, the first record featuring Steve Drizos (drums), and his wife Jenny Conlee of The Decemberists (backing vocals).

In parallel to the Jackmormons' career, Joseph released the solo record Everything Was Beautiful for Ulftone Records in 2000 featuring Ruppel, Rosen, Pete Droge, Ian Moore, Layng Martine III and others. Joseph's first release for Cosmo Sex School Records, a label he founded in 2003, was a duet with Danny Dzuik (credited as Dzuiks Küche), called Oil, which also featured David Lindley on the track Any Other Day. In 2004 Cherry was released on Terminus Records. 2006 brought April Nineteenth, recorded at Mississippi studios in Portland and featuring Joseph, Drizos and the return of Steve James. In 2010, the group released Badlandia, recorded in Virginia City, Montana and also featuring Conlee.

The first vinyl release on Cosmo Sex School was a 2012 Jackmormons 7" single of Mile High, Mile Deep backed with a cover of Michael Houser's Airplane. In 2012 the Jackmormons released Happy Book, a double CD set featuring guest appearances by Conlee, her Decemberists bandmate Chris Funk, Eric Earley (Blitzen Trapper), Dan Eccles (Richmond Fontaine), Ingram, Little Sue Weaver and Paul Brainard.

In 2008, Joseph and Drizos recorded a self-titled album under the moniker The Denmark Veseys. The album, recorded in Athens, GA and released on Cosmo Sex School, features appearances from Barbe, Neff and the Chase Park Transduction Choir. Soon after the pair entered the studio with multi-instrumentalist Bret Mosley to record the Charge EP at Old Soul Studio in Catskill, NY. The album was recorded live-to-tape and was the first album Joseph offered exclusively as an online download of digital tracks.

Joseph and his Stockholm Syndrome bandmate Wally Ingram teamed up for 2010's Civility EP which includes covers of M.I.A.'s Paper Planes and Blitzen Trapper's Furr.

Joseph released Jerry Joseph on October 31, 2013, an album of 11 original songs, many of which are older Jackmormons, Little Women and Stockholm Syndrome songs reworked to fit his current solo acoustic aesthetic.

== Stockholm Syndrome ==
Joseph began to use the Stockholm Syndrome moniker for a tour of Europe with Widespread Panic bassist Dave Schools in 2003.

The band later morphed into a five-piece with Schools, guitarist Eric McFadden, and Ingram. They recorded Holy Happy Hour at the famed Compass Point Studios with producer Terry Manning. The album featured mostly new compositions, along with a cover of the Climax Blues Band's Couldn't Get It Right.

Stockholm Syndrome toured in 2004 to support the album, while Schools' primary gig was on hiatus. Stockholm Syndrome reformed in 2010 with Gov't Mule keyboardist Danny Louis replacing Dzuik, and recorded Live at Streetlight Records during a tour stop in California, and also Apollo in 2011.

== Songwriting ==
Joseph is noted for his songwriting and the depth of his "creative, cathartic" lyrics. Widespread Panic has covered seven of Joseph's songs on record, and several others live.

"Climb To Safety" has appeared on the 'Til the Medicine Takes, Live in the Classic City, Colorado Springs 1998, Wood and Choice Cuts: The Capricorn Years 1991-1999 albums.

His song "North" (co-written with Woody Harrelson) was featured in the movie The Earth Will Swallow You and later on the studio album Dirty Side Down and archival release Wilmington, DE 2001.

He later co-wrote "Second Skin" and "Time Zones" for Earth to America and three compositions for the Free Somehow album, "Boom Boom Boom", "Flicker", and "Dark Day Program".

He co-authored "Yellow Ribbons" for Bloodkin with lead singer Daniel Hutchens.

== Awards ==
In 2015, Joseph was inducted into the Oregon Music Hall of Fame.

== Discography ==
Artist	Album title	Release date	Label	Format(s)
Little Women	Life's Just Bitchin'	1987/2017	Cosmo Sex School Records	Studio EP
Little Women	Pretty Wiped Out	1990/2020	Cosmo Sex School Records	Studio
Little Women	Live at New George's	1993		Live
Jerry Joseph	Welcome Hunters	1993		Studio
Jerry Joseph	Love and Happiness	1994	Back Door Records	Studio
Jerry Joseph & The Jackmormons	Butte, Montana 1879	1996	Holladay	Studio
Jerry Joseph & The Jackmormons	Cotton	1997	Holladay	Studio EP
Jerry Joseph & The Jackmormons	Goodlandia	1997	Trespass	Live
Jerry Joseph & The Jackmormons	Salt Lake City	1998	Holladay	Studio
Jerry Joseph	Everything was Beautiful	2000	Ulftone	Studio
Jerry Joseph & The Jackmormons	Conscious Contact	2002	Terminus	Studio
Jerry Joseph and Dziuks Kuche	Oil	2003	Cosmo Sex School Records	Studio
Jerry Joseph & The Jackmormons	Mouthful of Copper	2003	Terminus	Live
Stockholm Syndrome	Holy Happy Hour	2004		Studio
Jerry Joseph	Cherry	2004		Studio
Jerry Joseph & The Jackmormons	Into the Lovely	2005		Studio
Jerry Joseph	April Nineteenth	2006	Reap and Sow	Live
Little Women	Live Radish Head	2006	Cosmo Sex School Records	Live
The Denmark Veseys	The Denmark Veseys	2008	Cosmo Sex School Records	Studio
Stockholm Syndrome	Live at Streetlight Records	2009		Live
Jerry Joseph, Bret Mosley, and Steve Drizos	Charge	2009	Cosmo Sex School Records	Studio EP
Jerry Joseph & The Jackmormons	Badlandia	2010	Cosmo Sex School Records	Live
Jerry Joseph & Wally Ingram	Civility	2010	Cosmo Sex School Records	Studio
Stockholm Syndrome	Live at Streetlight Records	2010	Cosmo Sex School Records	Live EP
Stockholm Syndrome	Apollo	2011	Cosmo Sex School Records	Studio
Jerry Joseph & The Jackmormons	Happy Book	2012	Cosmo Sex School Records	Studio
Jerry Joseph & The Jackmormons	Mile High, Mile Deep/Airplane	2012	Cosmo Sex School Records	Studio 7"
Jerry Joseph & The Jackmormons	Happy Book/She's Going Out	2013	Cosmo Sex School Records	Studio 10"
Jerry Joseph & The Jackmormons	The Road Home	2013	Cosmo Sex School Records	Studio EP
Jerry Joseph	Jerry Joseph	2013	Cosmo Sex School Records	Studio
Jerry Joseph & The Jackmormons	Singin' In The Rain	2014	Cosmo Sex School Records	Studio
Jerry Joseph	Istanbul/Fog of War	2015	Cosmo Sex School Records	Studio
Jerry Joseph	By The Time Your Rocket Gets To Mars	2016	Cosmo Sex School Records	Studio
Jerry Joseph	Weird Blood	2017	Cosmo/Cavity Search Records	Studio
Jerry Joseph	Full Metal Burqa	2018	Cosmo Sex School/Cavity Search	Studio
Jerry Joseph	The Beautiful Madness	2020	Cosmo Sex School Records	Studio
Jerry Joseph	Baby, You're The Man Who Would Be King	2023	Cosmo Sex School Records	Studio
Jerry Joseph & The Jackmormons	Panther Tracks Volume 1	2025	World Will Turn Records	Studio
