= A Change in the Weather =

1995 video game

- Developer: Andrew Plotkin
- Platform: Z-machine
- Release: 1995
- Genre: Interactive fiction

A Change in the Weather is a 1995 interactive fiction (IF) video game.

Developed by Andrew Plotkin, the game is written in version five of the Inform programming language, and compiled for the Z-machine, a virtual machine that allows interactive fiction to be played on a variety of platforms. On June 24, 2014, Plotkin shared A Change in the Weather's source code for "personal, educational use only."

The game tied for first place in the Inform category of the 1995 Interactive Fiction Competition.

As one of six IF games recommended by CU Amiga in 1998, Jason Compton called A Change in the Weather "Very, very hard, it challenges IF conventions and makes you think (and save your game) quite a lot." Interactive fiction scholar Nick Montfort called it "remarkable ... for its attempts to integrate the typical sorts of adventure-game puzzles with the description of landscape, the simulation of an animal character, and the emotional situation of the 'adventurer' player character".

A Change in the Weather is included in the game collection that comes with the popular IF interpreter Frotz for the iPhone.
