= Door Harp =

Studio album by Michael Houser
- Released: 2002
- Recorded: 2002
- Genre: Instrumental
- Label: Sanctuary Records
- Producer: John Keane

Michael Houser chronology
Door Harp (2002)	Sandbox (2006)

Door Harp is the first solo studio album by Michael Houser, former lead guitarist of Widespread Panic; the album was released posthumously on September 24, 2002, on Sanctuary Records. Recorded in John Keane's studio in Athens, GA in March 2002, the all-instrumental album features Mikey on guitar, mandolin and piano. Bandmate Domingo S. Ortiz plays percussion, Keane plays guitar, keyboards and pedal steel guitar, and local musicians David Henry and Andy Carlson play violin and cello respectively.

The album is all original tracks, with only Cleburne Terrace having been played previously by Widespread Panic on several occasions in the early 1990s. Musically, it is a departure from the typical output of Widespread Panic, with very sparse arrangements and acoustic melodies, lilting lullabies and very little percussion.

== Track listing ==
All songs written by Michael Houser

1. "Missoula" – 3:21
2. "Eva's Song" – 2:32
3. "Barbette's Song" – 4:11
4. "Spanish Gold" – 3:31
5. "Old #1" – 3:02
6. "The Westerly Wind" – 2:13
7. "Cleburne Terrace" – 3:28
8. "Door Harp" – 4:43
9. "Fall Line" – 3:35
10. "The Owl's Song" – 3:51
11. "The Music Song" – 3:57
12. "Lullaby for NYC" – 3:23
13. "A Change in the Weather" – 4:23
14. "Quietude" – 3:08
