= Valdosta 1989 =

Live album by Widespread Panic
- Released: February 24, 2009
- Recorded: April 8, 1989
- Genres: Rock, southern rock, jam
- Label: Widespread Records

Widespread Panic chronology
Carbondale 2000 (2008)	Valdosta 1989 (2009)

Valdosta 1989 is a complete concert by Athens, Georgia's Widespread Panic on CD. The 2 disc set is the second release from the Widespread Panic archives. The performance was recorded live at The Armory in Valdosta, Georgia on April 8, 1989. The live to two track recordings feature all original band members including late guitarist Michael Houser.

== Track listing ==
=== Disc 1 ===
1. "Porch Song" (Widespread Panic) – :44
2. "Space Wrangler" (Widespread Panic) – 7:51
3. "Travelin' Light" (J.J. Cale) – 4:47
4. "Heaven" (David Byrne / Jerry Harrison) – 5:39
5. "Machine" (Widespread Panic) – 3:45
6. "Conrad" (Widespread Panic) – 7:41
7. "Holden Oversoul" (Widespread Panic) – 3:49
8. "Stop-Go" (Widespread Panic) – 6:53
9. "Cream Puff War" (Jerry Garcia/Hunter) – 4:08
10. "Pigeons" (Widespread Panic) – 5:57
11. "C. Brown" (Widespread Panic) – 6:53
12. "Coconut" (Widespread Panic) – 7:00

=== Disc 2 ===
1. "Jam" (Widespread Panic) – 2:28
2. "LA" (Widespread Panic) – 3:48
3. "A of D" (Widespread Panic) – 3:06
4. "B of D" (Widespread Panic) – 5:04
5. "Impossible" (Widespread Panic) – 5:52
6. "I'm Not Alone" (Widespread Panic) – 4:28
7. "Barstools and Dreamers" (Widespread Panic) – 10:34
8. "Driving Song" (Widespread Panic) – 4:20
9. "Disco" (Widespread Panic) – 5:52
10. "Driving Song" (Widespread Panic) – 7:28
11. "The Last Straw" (Widespread Panic) – 5:42
12. "Jack" (Widespread Panic) – 6:38
13. "Chilly Water" (Widespread Panic) – 9:54
14. "Can't Find My Way Home" (Steve Winwood) – 4:33

== Personnel ==
=== Widespread Panic ===
- John "JB" Bell – Vocals, Guitar
- Michael Houser – Guitar, Vocals
- Dave Schools – Bass
- Todd Nance – Drums
- Domingo S. Ortiz – Percussion

=== Production ===
- Mixed by John Keane/Keane Recording, Ltd, Athens, GA.
- Live 2 Track Mix by Doug Oade
- Live Recording by Bill "Gomer" Jordan and Doug Oade
- Packaging by Chris Bilheimer
