= The Low Spark of High Heeled Boys (song) =

Song by Traffic

from the album The Low Spark of High Heeled Boys
- Released: 26 November 1971
- Recorded: September 1971
- Studio: Island Studios, London
- Genre: Progressive rock
- Length: 11:44
- Label: Island
- Songwriters: Steve Winwood, Jim Capaldi
- Producer: Steve Winwood

Audio
- "The Low Spark of High Heeled Boys" on YouTube

"The Low Spark of High Heeled Boys" is the title track from the 1971 album by British rock band Traffic, written by Jim Capaldi and Steve Winwood. Despite never being released as a single due to its long duration, it became a staple of North American AOR-format FM radio stations in the 1970s and still receives airplay on classic rock radio today.

== Lyrics and composition ==
The title refers to an inscription written by American actor Michael J. Pollard in Jim Capaldi's notebook while they were both in Morocco. Capaldi and Pollard were planning to work on a movie that was never filmed. Capaldi said:

Pollard and I would sit around writing lyrics all day, talking about Bob Dylan and The Band, thinking up ridiculous plots for the movie. Before I left Morocco, Pollard wrote in my book 'The Low Spark of High Heeled Boys'. For me, it summed him up. He had this tremendous rebel attitude. He walked around in his cowboy boots, his leather jacket. At the time he was a heavy little dude. It seemed to sum up all the people of that generation who were just rebels. The 'Low Spark', for me, was the spirit, high-spirited. You know, standing on a street corner. The low rider. The 'Low Spark' meaning that strong undercurrent at the street level.

At 11 minutes and 44 seconds, it is the longest track on the album. The song (and the album) received wide praise, both in print and on broadcasts. It begins with a gradual fade-in and ends with a slow fade-out. The signature two-chord (Note: Dm^{7}-Em^{7}/D) piano vamp enters after the fade-in, cued by the dry rattle of a vibraslap. Verses are sparsely arranged with a slow deliberate pace in D minor, contrasting with double-time densely-layered pop choruses modulating to D major. The tune fades out with a dissonant, reverberating final chord sustained over the vamp.

Capaldi had originally written only two verses of lyrics. He quickly wrote the third verse while Winwood was recording the song's vocal and slipped it in front of him in time for him to sing it.

== Recordings ==
The album cut features extended solos, by Chris Wood on tenor saxophone and by Winwood both on piano and on a Hammond organ distorted through a fuzzbox. David Lubin wrote in his album review that appeared in Rolling Stone in 1972, "Each member of the group lays down a track or tracks which could in parts stand alone".

A live rendition of the song is the opening track on Traffic's only concert video, which was recorded at the Santa Monica Civic Auditorium in Santa Monica, California on 21 February 1972, with the lineup of Winwood, Capaldi, Wood, Rebop Kwaku Baah (percussion), David Hood (bass), and Roger Hawkins (drums). Another live recording with the same lineup plus extra keyboardist Barry Beckett appears on the album On the Road.

An alternate mix of the song is available on the 2010 box set Revolutions – The Very Best of Steve Winwood. The Revolutions version has a longer running time, of 12:26. The intro is longer and various instrumental embellishments (mainly from saxophone and percussion) are featured that are not heard in the original album version.

In 2022, Winwood promoted on YouTube the release of its parent album in Dolby Atmos format with a solo rendition of the title song on piano.

In addition to being performed solo by both Capaldi and Winwood after the breakup of Traffic, the song has been covered by Rickie Lee Jones, Widespread Panic, The Dead, Phil Lesh and Friends, and EMF among others.

Original Traffic member Dave Mason, who'd been out of the band at the time of the song's recording, started performing it regularly in 2014 and included a version featuring Joe Bonamassa on his 2023 album A Shade of Blues.

== Personnel ==
- Steve Winwood – vocal, piano, Hammond organ
- Chris Wood – tenor saxophone
- Ric Grech – bass guitar
- Jim Gordon – drums
- Rebop Kwaku Baah – congas
- Jim Capaldi – additional percussion
