= Oak Mountain Amphitheatre =

Outdoor amphitheater in Pelham, Alabama, U.S.

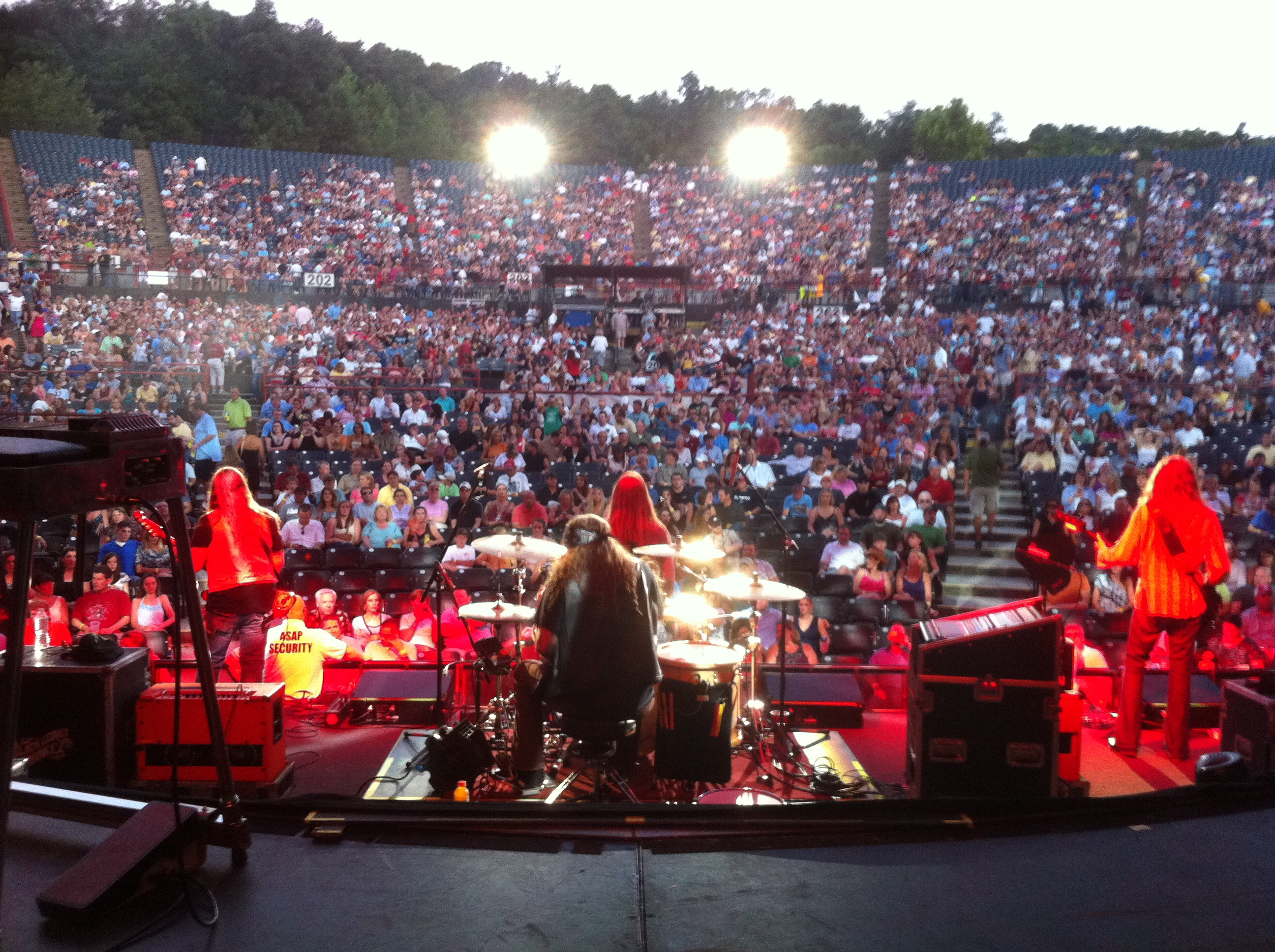
- Blackberry Smoke Live at Oak Mountain Amphitheatre
- Interactive map of Oak Mountain Amphitheatre
- Address: 1000 Amphitheatre Drive
- Location: Pelham, Alabama
- Coordinates: 33°19′53.25″N 86°47′04.60″W
- Owner: Live Nation
- Capacity: 10,500
- Type: Amphitheatre

Construction
- Opened: 1986
- Closed: 2025

Website
- livenation.com

Oak Mountain Amphitheatre was an outdoor amphitheater, owned by Live Nation, located in Pelham, Alabama, USA, a few miles south of Birmingham. It was the largest outdoor music venue in Alabama. The amphitheater closed at the end of the 2024 concert season. Post Malone was the last concert was the venue. Live Nation demolished the venue in May 2025. The venue site was sold to the City of Pelham in 2025, who intends to develop the site as part of an arts and entertainment district. The closure of Oak Mountain coincided with the opening of the Coca-Cola Amphitheatre in Birmingham. In commenting on the closure of Oak Mountain Live Nation stated their attention was focused towards the new venue for Birmingham shows.

It was unusual in that the venue featured three tiers of reserved seating, with no general admission seating area.

John Mayer performed and recorded his show here, on September 12, 2002, which was later released as a CD/DVD, titled Any Given Thursday. Phish played five times at Oak Mountain between 1994 and 2021.
