= Michael Houser =

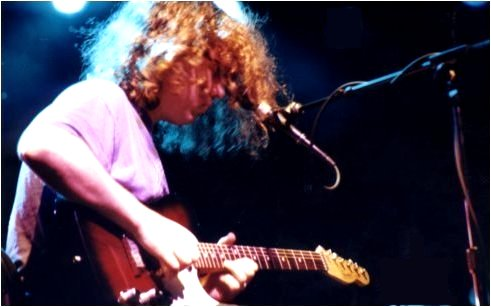

Background information
- Born: January 6, 1962; Boone, North Carolina, U.S.
- Origin: Athens, Georgia, U.S.
- Died: August 10, 2002 (aged 40) Athens, Georgia, U.S.
- Genres: Southern rock, blues rock, jam rock
- Occupations: Singer, songwriter, guitarist
- Years active: 1986–2002
- Labels: Widespread Records, Capricorn, Sanctuary, Landslide Records, Supercat Records
- Website: widespreadpanic.com

Michael Houser (January 6, 1962 – August 10, 2002) was an American guitarist known as a founding member and lead guitarist of the band Widespread Panic. He appeared on seven studio albums during his 16-year tenure with the band from 1986 until 2002. He is also featured on 4 live albums by Widespread Panic as well as several archive releases, live video concerts and compilations. Two solo albums by Houser were released posthumously.

== Musical career ==
Michael "Mikey" Houser was born in Boone, North Carolina. He graduated from Hixson High School in Chattanooga, Tennessee, and became a founding member of Widespread Panic in 1986 while attending the University of Georgia with John Bell. Michael's adolescent nickname was "Panic" due to his then frequent panic attacks, and this moniker later became the inspiration for the band's name.

Widespread Panic's large rhythm section, and John Bell's virtuosity as a rhythm guitarist, allowed Michael to pursue an atmospheric lead guitar style that often lingered behind the primary melodies. His predominant use of the volume pedal caused him to spend most of his performance time balanced on one leg; this would eventually lead to circulation problems causing his left leg to become numb. In 1996, during an acoustic tour known as the "Sit and Ski" tour, he was reminded of how much more comfortable and accurate his playing was while he was seated. Subsequently, Houser returned to playing all shows seated in 1997. His playing style used a volume pedal for sonic effect, rather than just for volume control.

Widespread Panic always shared writing credits for all of their songs during the Houser era, but he wrote many of the band's standards, including "Pleas," "Porch Song," "Airplane," "Ain't Life Grand," "The Waker," "Impossible," "Pilgrims," "You Got Yours," "This Part of Town," "Vacation," "Postcard," and others.

Diagnosed with pancreatic cancer in early 2002, he died on August 10 of that year, in Athens, Georgia, at the age of 40. A solo album of his instrumentals entitled Door Harp was released after his death, and was followed by Sandbox in 2006. He is survived by his wife Barbette and two children, Waker and Eva.

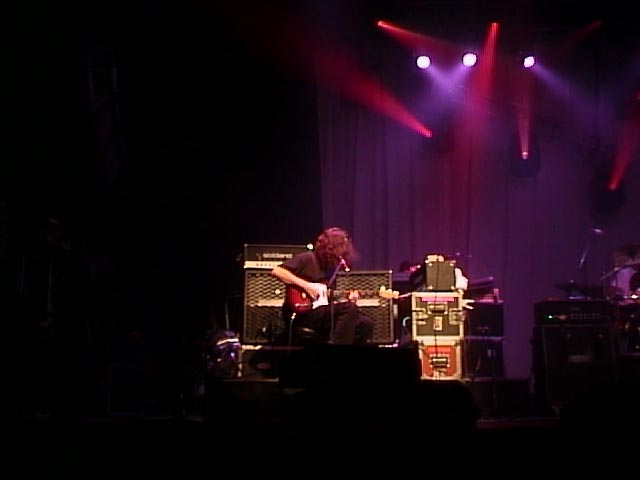
Houser onstage in Philadelphia, 2001

Widespread Panic has continued to tour and record after Houser's death, as was his wish.

== Equipment ==
Houser played a discontinued Fender Telecaster Plus Deluxe, a Telecaster with a humbucker replacing the single coil in the bridge pickup position. Houser purchased his first Telecaster Deluxe Plus second hand in 1991. A guitar lasted him about five years, needing to be replaced "'cause [he] sweated into [them] so much". Fender made two custom-remake replacements with his preferred discontinued Firestorm finish. Houser claimed of the three guitars, "they're as close as modern science can get".

These guitars had Lace Sensor pickups (a Blue at the neck, and a dual Red at the bridge with a mini switch to split them), a Strat-style tremolo behind the metal place surrounding the bridge pickups, and a roller nut. Houser didn’t like to use a whammy bar, preferring to pull up on the tail of the bridge instead. The mini switch is in between the volume and tone pots. This allows for a wider array of tones than a standard Telecaster. On most Telecasters, you can choose neck, bridge, or both pickups simultaneously. With the dual Reds in the bridge being splittable, you can choose neck, bridge dual, bridge single, or combinations of neck and dual bridge as well as neck and single bridge.

Houser's signature sound was also due to his use of Soldano SLO-100 heads through a Mesa/Boogie Quarterback 2x12 Cabinet. He played medium gauge D'Addario strings.

His effects included the Soldano Surf Box Spring Reverb / Tremolo / Vibrato unit, a Boss GE-7 Equalizer, the Ernie Ball 6166 Mono Volume Pedal, a TC Electronic TCF Chorus/Flanger and a Kendrick Model 1000 Tube Reverb.

== Discography ==
=== Solo studio albums ===
- 2002 Door Harp - Sanctuary Records
- 2006 Sandbox - Supercat Records

=== Widespread Panic studio albums ===
- 1988 Space Wrangler - Landslide Records
- 1991 Widespread Panic - Capricorn Records
- 1993 Everyday - Capricorn Records
- 1994 Ain't Life Grand - Capricorn Records
- 1997 Bombs & Butterflies - Capricorn Records
- 1999 'Til the Medicine Takes - Capricorn Records
- 2001 Don't Tell the Band - Widespread Records

=== Widespread Panic compilation album ===
- 2007 Choice Cuts: The Capricorn Years 1991-1999 - Capricorn Records

=== Widespread Panic live albums ===
- 1998 Light Fuse, Get Away - Capricorn Records
- 2002 Live in the Classic City - Widespread Records
- 2004 Jackassolantern - Widespread Records
- 2010 Live in the Classic City II - Widespread Records

=== Widespread Panic archive releases ===
- 2008 Carbondale 2000 Recorded live at Southern Illinois University Arena in Carbondale, Illinois on December 1, 2000
- 2009 Valdosta 1989 Recorded live at The Armory in Valdosta, Georgia on April 8, 1989
- 2009 Huntsville 1996 Recorded live at Von Braun Civic Center Arena in Huntsville, Alabama on April 3, 1996
- 2009 Montreal 1997 Recorded live at Club Soda in Montreal, Quebec, Canada on September 6, 1997
- 2010 Johnson City 2001 Recorded live at Freedom Hall in Johnson City, TN on November 20, 2001
- 2011 Colorado Springs 1998 Recorded live at City Auditorium in Colorado Springs, Colorado on October 20, 1998
- 2011 History Lesson New Years 1997 Recorded live at Fox Theater in Atlanta, Georgia on December 31, 1997
- 2013 Oak Mountain 2001 – Night 1 Recorded live at Oak Mountain Amphitheatre in Pelham, Alabama on July 27, 2001

=== Widespread Panic "Porch Songs" releases ===
- 2009 Mud Island '97 Recorded live at Mud Island Amphitheater Arena in Memphis, Tennessee on July 18 & 19, 1997
- 2010 June 2001 Santa Fe Recorded live at Paolo Soleri, Santa Fe, New Mexico June 19 & 20, 2001
- 2010 Wilmington, DE 2001 Recorded live at Kahuna Summer Stage in Wilmington, Delaware on July 22, 2001
- 2010 Milwaukee, WI 1996 Recorded live at Modjeska Theatre in Milwaukee, Wisconsin on November 1, 1996
- 2010 Chicago, IL 1996 Recorded live at the Aragon Ballroom in Chicago, Illinois on October 31, 1996
- 2010 Morrison, CO 1996 Recorded live at Red Rocks Amphitheatre in Morrison, Colorado on May 31, 1996
- 2011 Jackson, WY '96 Recorded live at Snow King Center Arena in Jackson, WY on February 6 & 7, 1996
- 2011 Geneva, MN 2001 Recorded live at Harmony Park Music Garden in Geneva, Minnesota on July 4, 2001
- 2012 Omaha, NE 1997 Recorded live at Ranch Bowl in Omaha, Nebraska on July 1, 1997

=== brute studio albums ===
- 1995 Nine High a Pallet – Capricorn Records
- 2002 Co-Balt – Widespread Records

=== with John Hermann ===
- 2001 Smiling Assassin – Fat Possum Records

=== with Jerry Joseph & The Jackmormons ===
- 2002 Conscious Contact - Terminus Records

=== with Bloodkin ===
- 1994 Good Luck Charm – Backdoor Records
- 1999 Out Of State Plates - Pretty Mean Records

=== Compilation albums ===
- 1992 The Mother Of All Flagpole Christmas Albums - with Widespread Panic - Long Play Records
- 1993 The Best of Mountain Stage Live, Vol. 5 - with Widespread Panic - Blue Plate Music
- 1994 Better Than A Poke In The Eye - with Widespread Panic - Long Play Records
- 1995 Hempilation: Freedom Is NORML - with Widespread Panic - Capricorn Records
- 1996 Five Ring Circus - with brute. - Flip Records
- 1997 To the Extreme - with Widespread Panic - American Recordings
- 2002 Crowd Around The Mic Vol. 6 - with brute. - WNCW Records
- 2002 Live From Bonnaroo - with Widespread Panic - Sanctuary Records
- 2003 Carved In Stone - with Widespread Panic - Harvest Media Group
