= Todd Nance =

American musician (1962–2020)

- Born: November 20, 1962; Chattanooga, Tennessee, U.S.
- Died: August 19, 2020 (aged 57) Athens, Georgia, U.S.
- Genres: Blues rock, Southern rock, jam rock
- Occupation: Musician
- Instrument: Drums
- Years active: 1977–2020
- Formerly of: Widespread Panic; brute.

Todd Nance (November 20, 1962 – August 19, 2020) was an American musician. He was best known as the original drummer of Widespread Panic, a band he was a member of until his departure in 2016. He struggled with chronic illness for the remainder of his life, ultimately leading up to his death in 2020.

== Early life ==
Todd Nance was born in Chattanooga, Tennessee. As a child, he began playing the guitar; subsequently he was given his first drum kit on Christmas Day, 1975. It was around this time that he attended his first concert, Lynyrd Skynyrd, and was inspired to pursue music more seriously. He first met his future Widespread Panic bandmate Michael Houser in high school in either 1977 or 1978 and they formed the band Just Us. After graduating from Chattanooga Central High School in 1981, Nance moved to Atlanta.

== Widespread Panic ==
Nance reconnected with Michael Houser in 1986 and joined the band that Houser had formed with John Bell and Dave Schools. The quartet performed their first show as Widespread Panic in February that same year. They developed a local following around Athens, Georgia before developing into a nationally known act. Nance played drums on the band's first eleven studio albums (he did not perform on their 2015 album, Street Dogs, but he did receive co-writing credit on all of the album's tracks).

Along with all the other members of Widespread Panic, Nance was a member of the band brute. between 1995 and 2002. This band consisted of everyone in Widespread Panic at the time (except for Domingo Ortiz, although he did perform on the band's second album) and Vic Chesnutt. They released two albums, Nine High a Pallet and Co-Balt.

He took a hiatus from Widespread Panic beginning in late 2014 to deal with personal matters. He was replaced for all live dates by Duane Trucks. He rejoined the band for four shows in February 2016 at their "Panic en La Playa" destination event. Following this, Widespread Panic announced that Nance had officially left the band and would be replaced by Trucks permanently.

== Other projects ==
Nance co-founded the supergroup Barbara Cue in 1997 with William Tonks, John Neff, Jon Mills, and Crumpy Edwards. The project was originally formed as an NRBQ cover band, but they soon developed their own material and began recording; they released three studio albums.

During his hiatus from Widespread Panic, Nance performed sporadically with a band billed as Todd Nance & Friends. Some musicians who performed with him in this group included Luther Dickinson, Jerry Joseph, and David Barbe.

In addition to these bands, Nance sat in with a number of bands following his hiatus and departure from Widespread Panic including Bloodkin and the Dyrty Byrds.

== Death ==
Nance died on August 19, 2020, in Athens, Georgia. He was 57; his death was first announced on Facebook by collaborator Cody Dickinson and was later confirmed by Relix. Details on the chronic illness that led to his death have not been disclosed.
