= John Hermann =

American singer, musician and songwriter

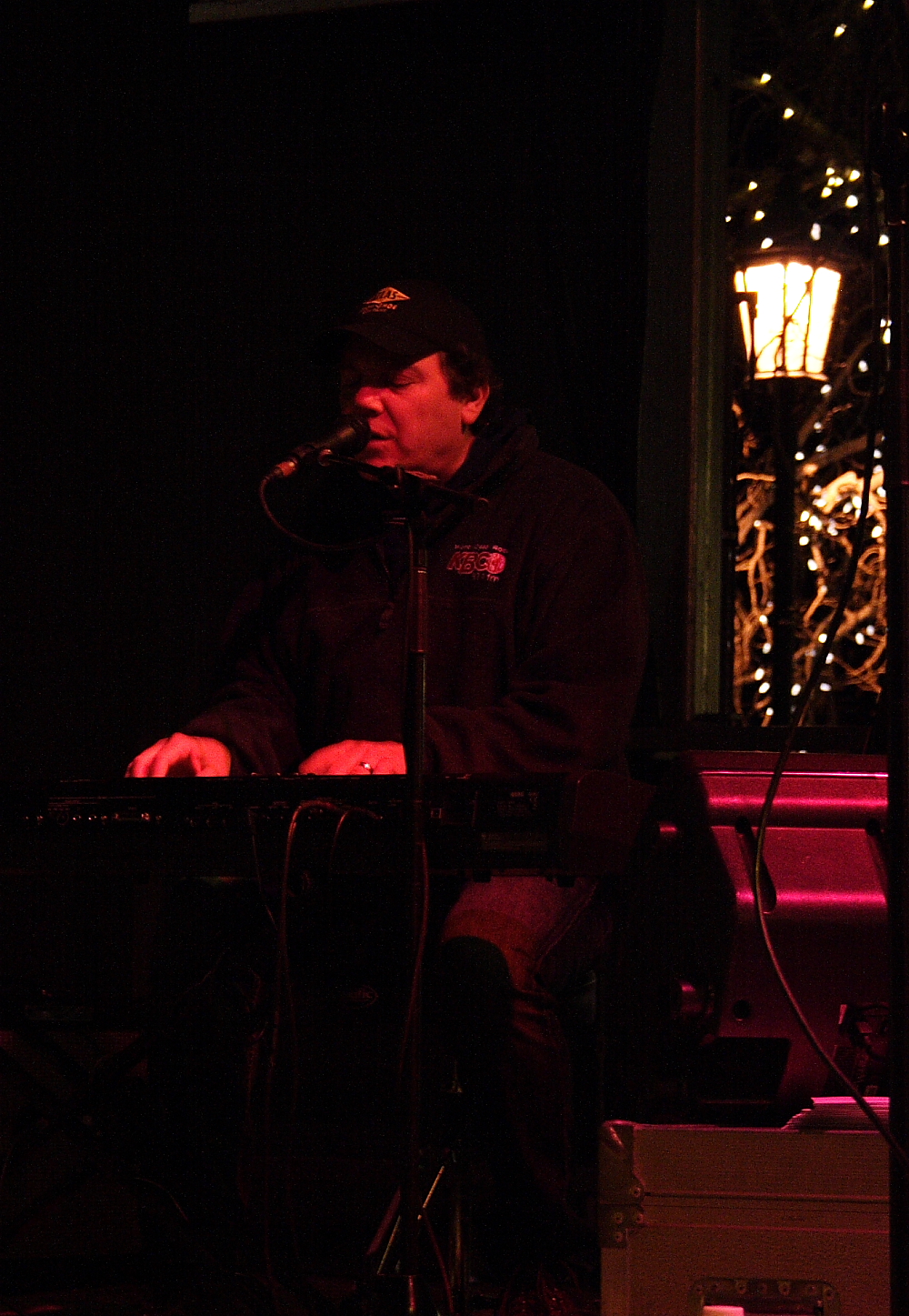
- Hermann performing in Vail, CO w/ his Mardi Gras Band

Background information
- Born: July 18, 1962 (age 63); New York City, New York; United States
- Origin: Oxford, Mississippi; United States
- Genres: Alternative rock, blues rock, jazz, blue-eyed soul
- Occupations: Musician, songwriter
- Instruments: Keyboards, vocals
- Years active: 1983-present

John "JoJo" Hermann (born July 18, 1962) is an American singer, musician and songwriter, best known for his involvement in the band Widespread Panic.

== Early life ==
He was born in New York City and attended Collegiate School, where he was a classmate of actor Billy Wirth and the journalist J. Peder Zane; he and Zane were pitchers on the school's baseball team. He began performing in small clubs while in college, including a ska group, The Terrorists, that included Wayne Kramer, and moved to Oxford, Mississippi after graduation. Hermann began songwriting and performing in 1983.

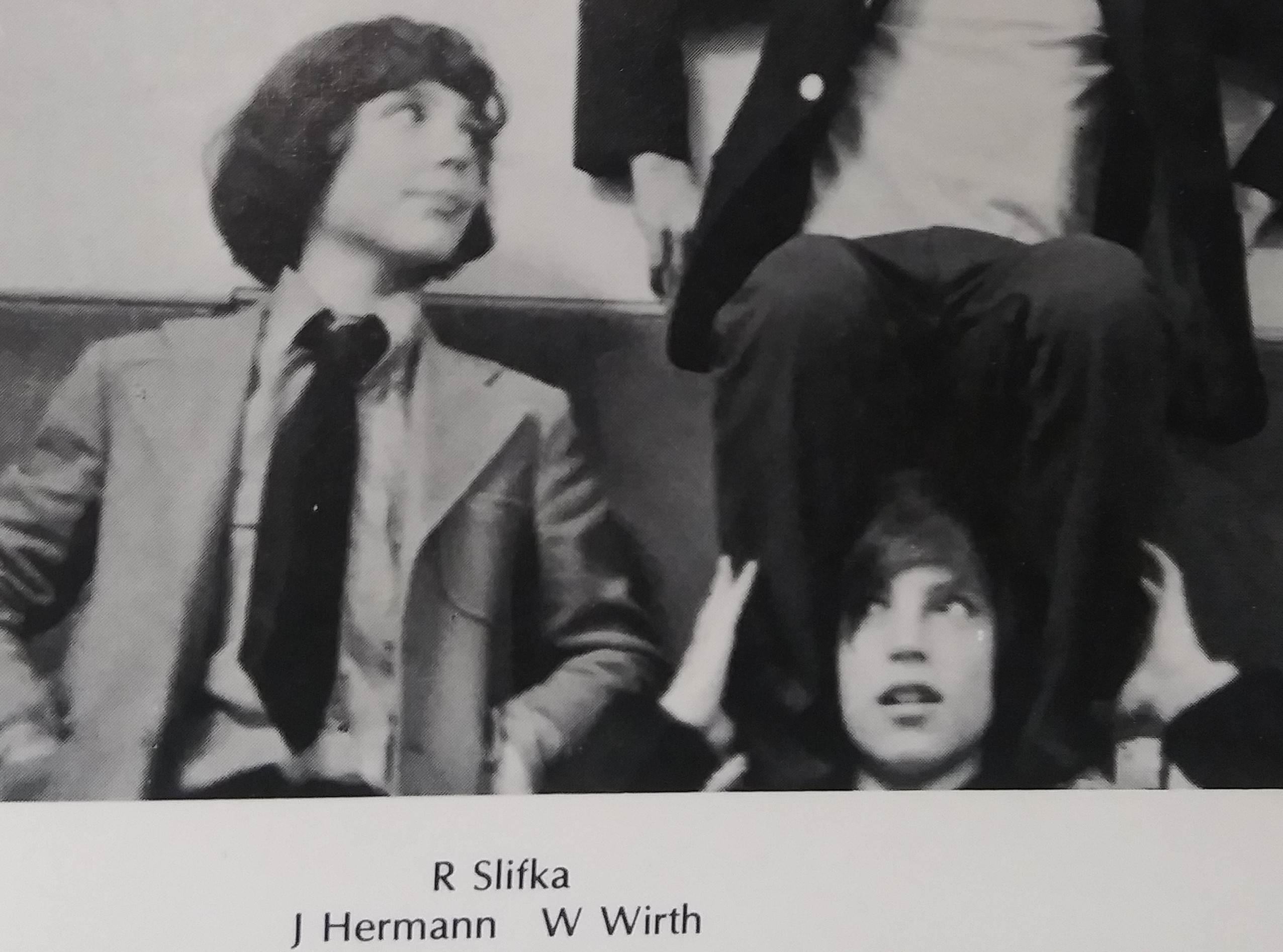
Hermann (left) and Billy Wirth (bottom right, under a classmate) in 1975

== Career ==
Hermann began playing piano in the local band Beanland with George McConnell on guitar appearing on JoJo's Defector, Smiling Assassin. After a friend of the band heard Hermann playing on an old upright piano at the Hoka Club also in Oxford. After extensive touring of the Southeast with Beanland, he then went on to join Athens, Georgia, based Widespread Panic in 1992 with whom he still plays keyboard and organ. Hermann is known for his lead vocals on many New Orleans style jazz and blues covers and originals along with gospel-style organ playing. He has been heavily influenced by artists such as Professor Longhair, Otis Spann, Junior Kimbrough and Otha Turner among others. In recent years Hermann has participated in several side projects, most notably JoJo and His Mojo Mardi Gras Band along with another side group consisting of Luther and Cody Dickinson of the North Mississippi Allstars.

He released his debut solo album Smiling Assassin in 2001. He has since released three more solo albums, Defector (2003), Just Ain't Right (2004), and the 2012 Larry Brown Amen album as the Missing Cats.

Hermann resides in Franklin, Tennessee, with his wife and two daughters.
