= Lynda Stipe =

American singer-songwriter and composer

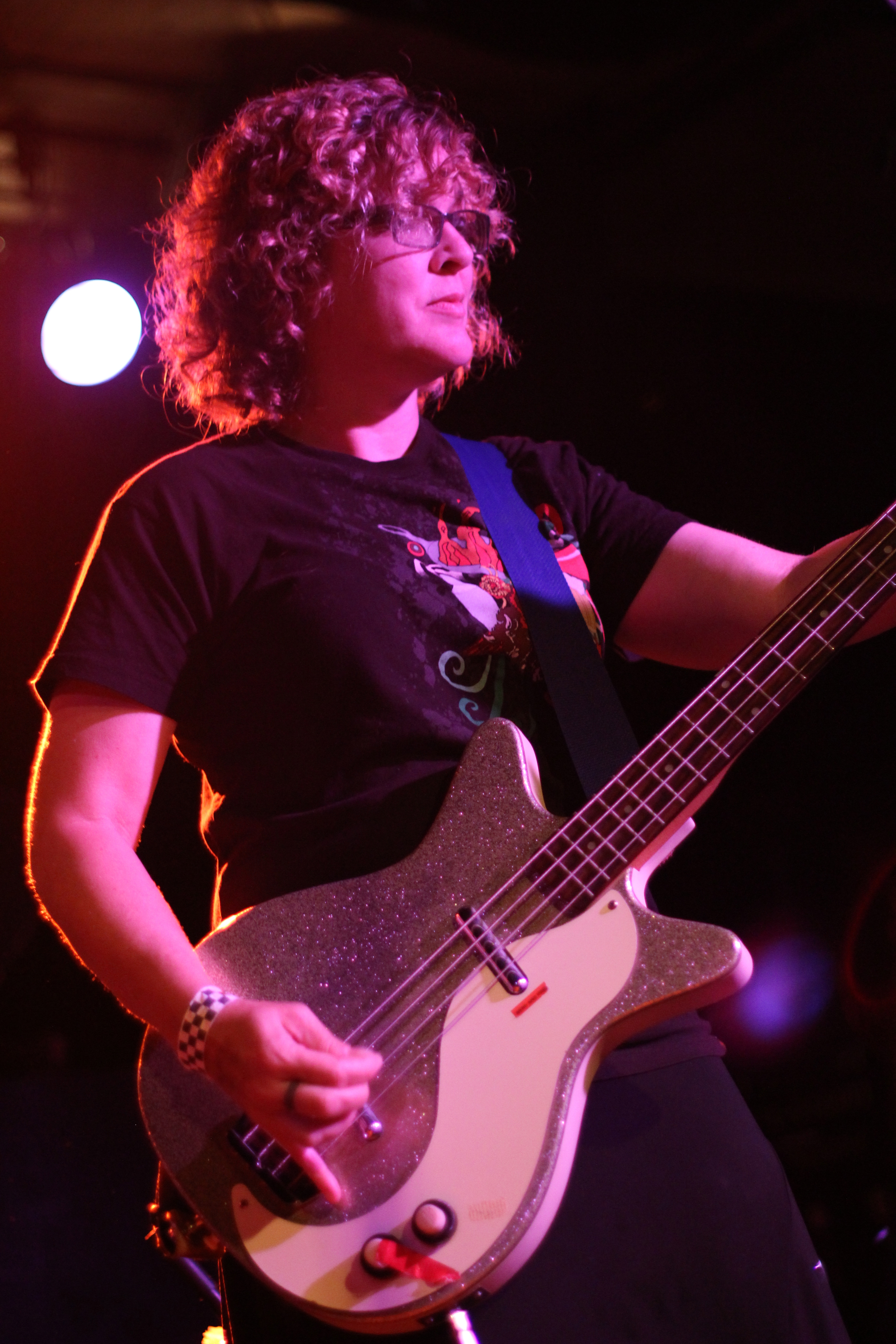
- Stipe with oh-OK in 2011

Background information
- Born: Lynda L. Stipe; September 30, 1962 (age 63); Decatur, Georgia, United States
- Genres: Post-punk, jangle pop
- Occupation: Musician
- Instruments: Vocals, bass guitar
- Years active: 1981–present
- Labels: DB, Texas Hotel

Lynda L. Stipe (born September 30, 1962) is an American singer and bass guitarist. She is best recognized for her involvement in the bands Oh-OK, Hetch Hetchy and Flash to Bang Time. She is the younger sister of R.E.M.'s lead singer Michael Stipe.

== Biography ==
In 1980, Lynda Stipe became involved in Athens music scene when she was invited by her older brother Michael Stipe to serve as the opening act for one of his bands. Along with vocalist Linda Hopper and drummer David Pierce, the group performed several songs live at the 40 Watt Club. The songs written for that performance would be recorded in the studio for Oh-OK's first single. The band produced one single and an album before parting ways in 1984.

Stipe later formed Hetch Hetchy with boyfriend and fellow musician Jay Totty in 1988, with her serving as lead vocalist and bass guitarist. In 1988, they recorded the EP Make Djibouti with several friends. It was issued through Texas Hotel and was produced by Michael Stipe. Afterward, Stipe and Totty opted to continue recording as a duo. Hetch Hetchy's debut album Swollen was released in 1990 and marked a musical departure from the band's previous recordings. Produced by Hahn Rowe and Tim Sommer of Hugo Largo, the music drew inspiration from gothic rock, dream pop and British folk music. Stipe has noted that the album better represented her writing abilities and contained arrangements that were better realized. A new Hetch Hetchy record was in development but Stipe and Totty broke off their relationship, effectively ending the group in 1991.

== Discography ==
=== Oh-OK ===
Year	Name
1982	Wow
1983	Furthermore What

=== Hetch Hetchy ===
Year	Name
1988	Make Djibouti
1990	Swollen

=== Other appearances ===
Year	Name	Artist	Details
1990	Little	Vic Chesnutt	voice
1994	Monster	R.E.M.	backing vocals ("Bang and Blame")
