= Hetch Hetchy (band) =

American punk rock band

- Origin: Athens, Georgia, United States
- Genres: Post-punk
- Years active: 1988–1991
- Label: Texas Hotel
- Past members: Rene Garcia; Evan Player; Donna Smith; Lynda Stipe; Jay Totty; Armistead Wellford

Hetch Hetchy was an American post-punk band formed in Athens, Georgia. Lynda Stipe, sometimes credited as Lynda L. Limner, was the only consistent member of the group until they permanently disbanded.

== History ==
The EP Make Djibouti was issued through Texas Hotel in 1988 and was produced by Lynda's brother Michael Stipe, the lead singer of the band R.E.M. After the release of Make Djibouti most of the original players left the band, leaving Stipe as the only remaining group member. Bassist and vocalist Jay Totty, who had recently moved from Athens to Florida, saw Stipe performing with her band Cowface and was impressed. They formed a new incarnation of Hetch Hetchy and released Swollen in 1990, with Tim Sommer and Hahn Rowe producing. In contrast to the group's previous release, Swollen drew inspiration from gothic rock, dream pop and British folk music, garnering them comparisons to Cocteau Twins and Hugo Largo.

== Discography ==
Studio albums

- Swollen (1990, Texas Hotel)

EPs

- Make Djibouti (1988, Texas Hotel)
