= Drum (album) =

Studio album by Hugo Largo
- Released: 1988
- Genre: Art rock
- Length: 27:50
- Label: Opal/Land/All Saints
- Producer: Michael Stipe

Hugo Largo chronology
Drum (1988)	Mettle (1989)

Drum is the first release from art rock band Hugo Largo. It was produced by Michael Stipe (who also provides backing vocals on two of the tracks) and released by Brian Eno's record label, Opal Records, in 1988. It had originally been released by Relativity Records in shorter form as an EP in 1987. It was released in the United Kingdom by Land Records, and reissued by All Saints Records in 2005.

== Critical reception ==
Professional ratings
Review scores
Source	Rating
AllMusic	4.5/5 stars
Los Angeles Daily News	A
The Village Voice	D+

The Los Angeles Daily News opined that Mimi Goese "has a haunting, strikingly beautiful voice."

The Guardian included it on a list of "1000 Albums to Hear Before You Die", in 2007.

== Track listing ==
1. "Grow Wild" (Mimi Goese, Adam Peacock, Hahn Rowe, Tim Sommer) - 3:46
2. "Eskimo Song" (Goese, Peacock, Rowe, Sommer) - 3:42
3. "Fancy" (Ray Davies) - 4:18
4. "Harpers" (Goese, Stipe) - 2:22
5. "Scream Tall" (Goese, Peacock, Rowe, Sommer) - 3:17
6. "Country" (Goese, Peacock, Rowe, Sommer) - 3:42
7. "Eureka" (Goese, Peacock, Rowe, Sommer) - 3:13
8. "Second Skin" (Goese, Sommer) - 3:16
9. "My Favorite People" (Goese) - 0:55

== Notes ==
"Fancy" is a cover of a song first released by the Kinks on their album Face to Face.
