= Mettle (album) =

Studio album by Hugo Largo
- Released: January 1, 1989
- Studio: Dreamland (Hurley, New York)
- Genre: Art rock, post-rock
- Length: 34:01
- Label: Opal Ltd, All Saints Records
- Producer: Hahn Rowe

Hugo Largo chronology
Drum (1988)	Mettle (1989)

Professional ratings
Review scores
Source	Rating
Allmusic	4.5/5 stars

Mettle is the second and final release from art rock band Hugo Largo. It was released by Brian Eno's record label, Opal, on January 1, 1989 and was supported by a European tour following its release. Mettle was produced by then-member and current electronic musician Hahn Rowe.

== Track listing ==
No.	Title	Length
1.	"Turtle Song"	3:17
2.	"Hot Day"	3:52
3.	"Martha"	4:18
4.	"Halfway Knowing"	5:25
5.	"4 Brothers"	4:51
6.	"Ohio"	2:40
7.	"Jungle Jim"	3:39
8.	"Never Mind"	6:11

== Personnel ==
Hugo Largo

- Adam Peacock
- Hahn Rowe
- Mimi Goese
- Tim Sommer

== Notes ==
This was Hugo Largo's last album before their initial breakup, although a later 1990-91 lineup wrote and recorded new material for a third, never-released album.
