= Swollen (album) =

Studio album by Hetch Hetchy
- Released: 1990
- Genres: Post-punk, dream pop
- Length: 32:41
- Label: Texas Hotel
- Producers: Hahn Rowe, Tim Sommer

Hetch Hetchy chronology
| Make Djibouti (1988) | Swollen (1990) |

Professional ratings
Review scores
| Source | Rating |
|---|---|
| Allmusic | (unrated) |

Swollen is the debut album of Hetch Hetchy, released in 1990 by Texas Hotel Records.

== Track listing ==
All tracks are written by Hetch Hetchy.

| No. | Title | Length |
|---|---|---|
| 1. | "Commonplace" | 3:31 |
| 2. | "Heavens" | 3:49 |
| 3. | "Satanette" | 3:04 |
| 4. | "Perfect Puzzle" | 4:25 |
| 5. | "Mango Wienie" | 2:39 |
| 6. | "Retsina" | 4:21 |
| 7. | "Bow Song" | 4:23 |
| 8. | "Erotic CPR" | 2:30 |
| 9. | "Mother's Drum" | 3:16 |
| 10. | "[untitled]" | 0:44 |

== Personnel ==
Hetch Hetchy

- Lynda Stipe – vocals, bass guitar, keyboards
- Jay Totty – guitar, bass guitar, backing vocals

Production and additional personnel

- Hahn Rowe – production
- Tim Sommer – production

== Release history ==
| Region | Date | Label | Format | Catalog |
|---|---|---|---|---|
| United States | 1990 | Texas Hotel | CD, CS, LP | Texas Hotel 19 |
