= Texas Hotel =

Texas Hotel may refer to:

- Texas Hotel Records
- Hotel Texas, Fort Worth, Texas
