= Take Me to God =

Studio album by Jah Wobble
- Released: 1994
- Label: Island
- Producer: Jah Wobble

Jah Wobble chronology
Rising Above Bedlam (1991)	Take Me to God (1994)	Spinner (1995)

Singles from Take Me to God
- 1. "Becoming More Like God" Released: 1994; 2. "The Sun Does Rise" Released: 1994; 3. "Amor" Released: 1994

Take Me to God is an album by the English musician Jah Wobble, released in 1994. It is credited to his Invaders of the Heart. The first single was "Becoming More Like God". Take Me to God peaked at No. 13 on the UK Albums Chart. Wobble supported it with a UK tour. The album peaked at No. 160 on the ARIA Charts. Wobble considered 1998's Umbra Sumus to be a sequel. Wobble supported it with a UK tour. In 2011, Cherry Red Records re-released the album as a two-disc CD set featuring 16 extra tracks.

== Production ==
Wobble used 12 guest vocalists on the album. Dolores O'Riordan sang on "The Sun Does Rise". Abdel Ali Slimani contributed vocals to the raï song "I'm an Algerian". Natacha Atlas sang on the three songs that she cowrote. Baaba Maal guested on "Angels".

== Critical reception ==
Professional ratings
Review scores
Source	Rating
AllMusic	4.5/5 stars
The Encyclopedia of Popular Music	4/5 stars
MusicHound Rock: The Essential Album Guide	3.5/5 stars

The Guardian said that "Wobble sensibly allows a prodigious list of guests to lead the line, while his own Blakean declarations add a nutty metaphysics to a deliriously creative album"; the paper's Caroline Sullivan later listed the album as the seventh best of 1994. Trouser Press concluded that "the record takes on far too much to be thoroughly solid, but it is still recommended." The Independent determined that "it's the rhythms that count: deep, unhurried and underpinned by the marvellous bass of Wobble himself." The Times noted that "Wobble has evolved into a figure of almost buddha-like calm and authority as he threads his fat, languid bass lines through a cosmopolitan patchwork of musical styles." The Oakland Tribune praised "the propulsive dance-rock rhythmic base."

AllMusic wrote that "it's an interesting assortment of tracks combining currents flowing through mid-'90s alternative rock, world music, reggae, club beats, dub, and African pop, adding up to an extremely heterogeneous whole." In 2024, Uncut listed Take Me to God as the 301st greatest album of the 1990s.

== Track listing ==
No.	Title	Length
1.	"God in the Beginning"
2.	"Becoming More Like God"
3.	"Whisky Priests"
4.	"I'm an Algerian"
5.	"Amor"
6.	"Amor Dub"
7.	"Take Me to God"
8.	"The Sun Does Rise"
9.	"When the Storm Comes"
10.	"I Love Everybody"
11.	"Yoga of the Nightclub"
12.	"I Am the Music"
13.	"The Bonds of Love"
14.	"Angels"
15.	"No Change Is Sexy"
16.	"Raga"
17.	"Forever"
