= At the Cut =

At The Cut

Studio album by Vic Chesnutt
- Released: September 21, 2009
- Recorded: December 2008, mixed in April 2009
- Genre: Folk-rock
- Length: 43:59
- Language: English
- Label: Constellation Records
- Producer: Guy Picciotto

Vic Chesnutt chronology
Dark Developments (2008)	At The Cut (2009)	Skitter on Take-Off (2009)

Professional ratings
Review scores
Source	Rating
AllMusic	4/5 stars
Spin	3.5/5 stars

At the Cut is a 2009 album by Vic Chesnutt. It was his penultimate album release before his death on December 25, 2009, from an overdose of muscle relaxants. The song "Flirted with You All My Life" alludes to Chesnutt's own attitude toward suicide, including his previous attempts to take his own life. Along with North Star Deserter, this album features various members from the Canadian post-rock band Thee Silver Mt. Zion Memorial Orchestra, as well as Fugazi's vocalist and guitarist Guy Picciotto. Anecdotal Evidence, a short film by Jem Cohen, was shot during one of Chesnutt's final recording sessions at the Hotel2Tango in Montreal.

== Track listing ==
All songs written by Vic Chesnutt

1. "Coward" – 5:16
2. "When the Bottom Fell Out" – 3:11
3. "Chinaberry Tree" – 4:11
4. "Chain" – 3:00
5. "We Hovered with Short Wings" – 5:15
6. "Philip Guston" – 3:28
7. "Concord Country Jubilee" – 4:33
8. "Flirted with You All My Life" – 4:42
9. "It Is What It Is" – 6:59
10. "Granny" – 3:25

== Personnel ==
Musicians

- Vic Chesnutt – guitar, vocals
- Thierry Amar – contrabass, engineering
- Chad Jones – guitar
- Efrim Menuck – guitar, keyboards, vocals, engineering
- Jessica Moss – violin, vocals
- Nadia Moss – organ, piano, vocals
- David Payant – drums, keyboards, vocals
- Guy Picciotto – guitar

Technical personnel

- Howard Bilerman – engineering
- Harris Newman of Grey Market Mastering – finalizing
- Radwan Moumneh – engineering
- Guy Picciotto – engineering
- Jem Cohen – art direction and cover image
