= Make Djibouti =

EP by Hetch Hetchy
- Released: 1988
- Genre: Post-punk
- Length: 18:41
- Label: Texas Hotel
- Producer: Michael Stipe

Hetch Hetchy chronology
Make Djibouti (1988)	Swollen (1990)

Make Djibouti is an EP by Hetch Hetchy, released in 1988 through Texas Hotel Records. It was produced by vocalist Lynda Stipe's older brother Michael Stipe, of the band R.E.M.

== Track listing ==
All tracks are written by Hetch Hetchy.

Side one
No.	Title	Length
1.	"Retarded Camel"	3:04
2.	"Present"	4:38
3.	"Sad Song"	2:30

Side two
No.	Title	Length
1.	"Catscan"	2:50
2.	"Urgent"	2:47
3.	"Hard on Lynda"	2:52

== Personnel ==
Adapted from the Make Djibouti liner notes.

Hetch Hetchy

- Rene Garcia – percussion
- Lynda Stipe – lead vocals, bass guitar
- Donna Smith – keyboards, backing vocals

Production and additional personnel

- Michael Meister – backing vocals
- Armistead Wellford – clarinet, bass guitar
- Evan Player – bass guitar, percussion
- Michael Stipe – production

== Release history ==
Region	Date	Label	Format	Catalog
United States	1988	Texas Hotel	CS, LP	Texas Hotel 7
