= The Indecent =

American-Canadian alternative rock band

- Origin: New York City
- Genres: Alternative rock
- Years active: 2008–2014 (hiatus)
- Labels: Warner Bros.
- Members: Emily Brout; Bo Brout; Madeline Brout; Nicholas Burrows
- Website: www.theindecent.com

The Indecent were an American-Canadian alternative rock band band based in New York City, featuring triplets Emily, Madeline, and Bo Brout, along with Windsor, Ontario, Canada-based Nicholas Burrows The band emerged from the local music scene, garnering a significant amount of attention for their age and style. The Indecent was signed to Warner Bros. Records in early 2011.

== Band history ==
The Brout triplets were born on May 28, 1994, and have been performing together since the age of 8. They came together formally as The Indecent in the summer of 2008, originally under the aegis of producers Stuart Chatwood and musician and former record executive Tim Sommer. Around this time, Chatwood suggested to the group that drummer Nicholas Burrows (born October 8, 1995), the son of Tea Party and Crash Karma drummer Jeff Burrows, join the band. In the spring of 2010, the band went into the Cutting Room Studio and Shelter Island Sound, both in New York City, with Sommer producing, and Mark Dearnley engineering and mixing, and the band's first album, Her Screwed Up Head, was released on June 15, 2010.

== Mainstream exposure ==
The band first gained attention with a music video featuring a cover of "White Rabbit" by Jefferson Airplane, soon followed by a video for their own song. The band's first video from their debut album, Her Screwed Up Head, "25 Steps," was directed by Noah Hutton. Following this, the band released three more videos: "Soybean" (also from the album), "Lucky Ones" (a new track, produced by Julian Raymond and Tim Sommer), and a new version of the song "Her Screwed Up Head," also produced by Raymond and Sommer.

In March 2011, it was announced that the band had signed to Warner Bros. Records, as the first new-artist signing by the label's new chairman, Rob Cavallo. In April 2011, the band appeared on the cover of the British music/fashion magazine, Disorder.

On September 30 and October 1, 2011, The Indecent played their inaugural shows in the UK, at Manchester Academy and O2 Academy Islington

In June 2011, The Indecent began recording their first major label album, with Cavallo producing, in Los Angeles. On September 18, 2012, they released the Warner Bros. debut, a 5-song EP titled Control. The EP was culled from sessions that took place in the summer of 2011 with Rob Cavallo and Julian Raymond producing, along with some material recorded in the summer of 2010, with Raymond and Sommer again producing. The entire EP was mixed by Doug McKean. The band shot four videos for the EP, each directed by Noah Hutton, for the songs "Here Comes Another," "Control," "Hear Them Fear Them," and the re-recorded version of "Lucky Ones." The EP also features one hidden track, a guitar/drum freak-out titled "Mating Call," which follows the EP's final track after about twenty seconds of silence.

The Indecent performed at the first-ever Warped Tour event on British soil on November 10, 2012 at Alexandra Palace, and performed on the 2013 American Warped Tour.

== Members ==
- Emily Brout (vocals)
- Madeline Brout (Bass)
- Bo Brout (guitar)
- Nicholas Burrows (drums)
