= Downy Mildew (band) =

American folk pop/alternative rock band

- Origin: Los Angeles, California, United States
- Genres: Folk pop, alternative rock
- Years active: 1984–1995; 2009; 2019; 2025
- Labels: Texas Hotel, Glass, Triple X, High Street
- Past members: Jenny Homer; Charlie Baldonado; Nancy McCoy; Mike Marasse; John Hofer; Salvador Garza; Rob Jacobs; Janine Cooper; Jason Kahn

Downy Mildew was an American folk pop/alternative rock band from Los Angeles, California active from 1984 to 1995.

== History ==
Formed in Los Angeles, California in 1984, the early lineup consisted of Jenny Homer (guitar, vocals), Charlie Baldonado (vocals, guitar), Nancy McCoy (bass guitar), and Mike Marasse (drums), all students at local colleges. The band's first release was a self-titled EP on the Texas Hotel label in 1986. Their chamber-pop sound, inspired by 1960s pop and post punk saw them lumped in with the Paisley Underground scene. Their debut album Broomtree followed in 1987, and was released by Texas Hotel and Glass Records in the UK.

Marasse left, to be replaced by John Hofer, with Salvador Garza added on violin, and the new lineup recorded the album Mincing Steps, released in 1988 on Texas Hotel. Michael Stipe of R.E.M. directed a video for the song "Offering" from the album.

Hofer then left, and after a few years with only a sole single released on Triple X featuring the song "Cool Nights" which was produced by Andy Gill of Gang of Four and backed with a cover of the Bacharach/David song, "Walk On By" and a mash up of "Sunday Morning" by the Velvet Underground and "Leaving On A Jet Plane" by John Denver, the band returned in 1992 with the Elevator EP, released on the Windham Hill sub-label 'High Street', now with Rob Jacobs on drums. By this time their sound had evolved more towards alternative rock. This was followed by the album An Oncoming Train. McCoy left to start a family and was replaced by Janine Cooper (formerly of Pet Clarke) for the band's final album, Slow Sky, released in 1994. Both An Oncoming Train and Slow Sky were recorded in the band's own studio and mixed by Tchad Blake. The band split up in 1995.

== Discography ==
=== Albums ===
- Broomtree (1987), Texas Hotel/Glass
- Mincing Steps (1988), Texas Hotel
- An Oncoming Train (1992), High Street
- Slow Sky (1994), High Street

=== EPs ===
- Downy Mildew (1986), Texas Hotel
- Elevator (1992), High Street

=== Singles ===
- "Cool Nights" (1990), Triple X
