= The Legend Lives On... Jah Wobble in "Betrayal" =

Studio album by Jah Wobble
- Released: May 1980
- Studio: Gooseberry Sound Studios, London; The Barge (a recording studio built by sound engineer Tom Newman on board of Richard Branson's houseboat "Duende" on Regent's Canal, London W9
- Genre: Post-punk; dub
- Length: 39:08
- Label: Virgin VS337
- Producer: Eddie Jobson

Jah Wobble chronology
The Legend Lives On... Jah Wobble in "Betrayal" (1980)	V.I.E.P. EP (1980)

The Legend Lives On... Jah Wobble in "Betrayal" is the debut studio album by English bass guitarist Jah Wobble. Produced by musician Eddie Jobson, it was released in May 1980 through Virgin Records. A dispute over the use of rhythm tracks from his then band Public Image Ltd. on the album led to his departure from the band.

== Background and music ==
The album features a largely "guitar-free" sound, infused in reggae and punk-inspired dub." According to Trouser Press, Wobble "accentuates his reggae pretensions, fiddles with electronics and overdubbing and plays shadowy, threatening bass."

The tracks "Not Another" and "Blueberry Hill" primarily feature rhythm tracks originally recorded during the sessions for Public Image Ltd.'s second studio album, Metal Box (1979). This caused a dispute between Wobble and frontman John Lydon, which ultimately led to Wobble's departure in 1980.

Virgin Records' 1990 CD reissue of the album features seven bonus tracks, including a horn-laden remix of "Today Is the First Day."

== Critical reception ==
Professional ratings
Review scores
Source	Rating
Allmusic	3/5 stars

Allmusic critic Andy Kellman panned the Wobble's vocals on the album, describing them as "awful, most resembling a liquored up Colin Newman." However, Kellman also wrote: "Aside from these gripes, it remains a pretty strong record. The Legend Lives On's finer moments often occur when Wobble's mouth is shut, or when he chants rather than sings." Trouser Press similarly criticized the vocals, while at the same time regarding it as "a return to the DIY, no-rules punk tradition."

== Track listing ==
All tracks are written by Jah Wobble except where noted.

1. "Betrayal" — 4:52
2. "Beat the Drum For Me" — 4:02
3. "Blueberry Hill" (Vincent Rose, Larry Stock, Al Lewis) — 4:16
4. "Not Another" — 3:13
5. "Tales from Outer Space" — 3:03 (called "TV" on the original sleeve; corrected on 1990 CD release)
6. "Today Is the First Day of the Rest of My Life" — 7:24
7. "Dan MacArther" — 5:23
8. "Pineapple" — 6:55

1990 Virgin Records reissue bonus tracks

9. "Blueberry Hill" (Computer Version) — 4:19
10. "I Need You By My Side" — 3:35
11. "Message from Pluto" — 4:49
12. "Sea-Side Special" — 7:39
13. "Something Profound" — 6:07
14. "Dreadlock Don't Deal in Wedlock" — 4:31 Jah Wobble toasting over backing track provided by Wayne Jobson. The backing track was "Black Tracks" recorded by Lee Perry, September 1977 at Channel One Studios. 12" single released on 5 October 1978 b/w "Pthilius Pubis"
15. "Battle of Britain" — 7:59

== Personnel ==
Album personnel as adapted from Allmusic.

- Jah Wobble — bass guitar, vocals, composition
- Martin Atkins — drums on "Betrayal" and "Pineapple"
- Snow White (Bernadine Lawrence) - vocals on "Today Is the First Day of the Rest of My Life" and "Tales from Outer Space"
- Mark Angelo Lusardi - engineer, guitar
- Eddie Jobson — production
- Porky — mastering
- Brian Palmer — artwork, design
- Margaux Tomlinson — cover
- Pete Vernon — photography
