= Is the Actor Happy? =

Studio album by Vic Chesnutt
- Released: 1995
- Genre: Folk rock
- Label: Texas Hotel Records
- Producer: John Keane

Vic Chesnutt chronology
Drunk (1993)	Is the Actor Happy? (1995)	About to Choke (1996)

Is the Actor Happy? is an album by the American folk rock musician Vic Chesnutt, released in 1995. The title of the album's first track was used as the subtitle to a 1996 benefit album, Sweet Relief II: Gravity of the Situation, recorded to raise funds for Chesnutt's health care.

Chesnutt supported the album by touring with Friends of Dean Martinez. The album was reissued by New West Records in 2004.

== Background and production ==
The album was produced by John Keane. Michael Stipe contributed vocals to "Guilty by Association". Chesnutt wrote the songs while opening for Live on a 1994 tour.

== Music and lyrics ==
According to Steve Dollar of Paste Magazine: "Chesnutt was a rolling contradiction. His songs scanned like nursery rhymes but stuck—as he sang on “Betty Lonely” from Is the Actor Happy?, “like a flounder gig”—on polysyllabic turns of phrase that tease the ear as they beg for the Oxford English Dictionary. Elegant and ungainly, impish and morbidly depressed, flat-assed drunk and piercingly sober, his salient obsessions circled around private peculiarities and public personae, scrawled like graffiti on the wall of a gas station, glimpsed through the Spanish moss. His wounded warble was an epic surprise, too: sweeping like Marvin Gaye, in its way, and teetering with uncertainty—like a bastard Wallenda, who defied gravity out of sheer heart."

== Critical reception ==
Professional ratings
Review scores
Source	Rating
AllMusic	4.5/5 stars
Pitchfork	9.0/10
(The New) Rolling Stone Album Guide	3/5 stars

The Globe and Mail wrote that "there's a haunting, humble beauty and oddness that runs through these songs, delicately melodic ballads full of curious little observations and apologies, surreal non sequiturs and vivid imagery." The Sunday Times deemed the album a "finely wrought and stylistically consistent masterpiece," writing that "Chesnutt finally learned to write for a band, brushed drums and ringing lead-guitar lines tumbling over his simple strumming." The Press-Telegram called it "deep, poignant, almost always touching, with a fine edge of bitterness, sometimes even a cunning malice."

The Guardian determined that Chesnutt "does quiet tunes with loud bits and quiet tunes without loud bits, all sung in a curmudgeonly little voice, none of them amounting to a great deal." The Gazette listed Is the Actor Happy? as the best album of 1995; The Philadelphia Inquirer included it on its list of the year's 10 best.

AllMusic wrote: "Heartbreakingly delicate folk rock arrangements are followed by crashing guitar crescendos as the perfect vehicles for taking Chesnutt's songs to places very few songwriters have been or can go." Pitchfork called the album "not just arguably his finest release, but also his most extroverted ... His subject isn't just himself, but also his place among friends and amid the sprawl of the South."

== Track listing ==
No.	Title	Length
1.	"Gravity of the Situation"
2.	"Sad Peter Pan"
3.	"Strange Language"
4.	"Onion Soup"
5.	"Doubting Woman"
6.	"Wrong Piano"
7.	"Free of Hope"
8.	"Betty Lonely"
9.	"Thumbtack"
10.	"Thailand"
11.	"Guilty by Association"
