= Merriment =

Studio album by Vic Chesnutt
- Released: 29 August 2000
- Genre: Folk rock Alt-Country
- Label: Backburner Records
- Producer: Kelly Keneipp, Nikki Keneipp, Vic Chesnutt

Vic Chesnutt chronology
The Salesman and Bernadette (1998)	Merriment (2000)	Left to his Own Devices (2001)

Merriment is a 2000 album by Vic Chesnutt. The album is a collaborative effort between Georgia-based musicians Chesnutt and Kelly and Nikki Keneipp, with Chesnutt writing and singing the songs, and the Keneipps playing the music. It was released on the Keneipps' record label, Backburner Records, on August 29, 2000.

== Reception ==
Professional ratings
Review scores
Source	Rating
AllMusic	4/5 stars
The Austin Chronicle	3.5/4 stars
Los Angeles Times	2.5/4 stars
The New Rolling Stone Album Guide	3/5 stars
Pitchfork Media	8.0/10
The Stranger	4/4 stars

Pitchfork Media gave Merriment an 8.0.

== Track listing ==
All songs written by Vic Chesnutt.

Musical accompaniment by Kelly and Nikki Keneipp.

1. "Merriment" – 4:40
2. "Fissle" – 2:46
3. "Feather" – 2:46
4. "Sunny Pasture" – 2:43
5. "Preponderance" – 2:47
6. "Haiku" – 2:46
7. "Mighty Monkey" – 4:26
8. "DNA" – 3:00
9. "Deeper Currents" – 3:47
10. "Merriment Reprise" – 4:04
