= Skitter on Take-Off =

Studio album by Vic Chesnutt
- Released: October 6, 2009
- Recorded: 2009
- Label: Vapor
- Producer: Jonathan Richman

Vic Chesnutt chronology
At the Cut (2009)	Skitter on Take-Off (2009)

Professional ratings
Review scores
Source	Rating
AllMusic	3.5/5 stars
PopMatters	8/10 stars

Skitter on Take-Off is the final album by Vic Chesnutt. It was his only album for Vapor Records.

A different version of "Sewing Machine" was originally included on brute's 1995 release Nine High a Pallet (brute consisted of Vic Chesnutt backed by the members of Widespread Panic).

== Track listing ==
1. "Feast in the Time of Plague" – 3:53
2. "Unpacking My Suitcase" – 3:20
3. "Dimples" – 4:09
4. "Rips in the Fabric" – 6:00
5. "Society Sue" – 2:51
6. "My New Life" – 4:11
7. "Dick Cheney" – 3:18
8. "Worst Friend" – 7:46
9. "Sewing Machine" – 4:01

== Personnel ==
- Vic Chesnutt – vocals, guitar
- Tommy Larkins – drums
- Jonathan Richman – guitar, harmonium
