= The Salesman and Bernadette =

Studio album by Vic Chesnutt
- Released: November 10, 1998
- Genre: Folk rock
- Length: 54:48
- Label: Capricorn

Vic Chesnutt chronology
About to Choke (1996)	The Salesman and Bernadette (1998)	Merriment (2000)

Professional ratings
Review scores
Source	Rating
AllMusic	3.5/5 stars
Christgau's Consumer Guide	(neither)
The Encyclopedia of Popular Music	3/5 stars
Entertainment Weekly	A–
Edmonton Journal	4/5 stars
The New Rolling Stone Album Guide	4/5 stars
Rolling Stone	3.5/5 stars
Spin	8/10

The Salesman and Bernadette is a 1998 album by Vic Chesnutt. The backing musicians on the album are from the American alternative country group Lambchop.

== Track listing ==
All songs written by Vic Chesnutt

1. "Duty Free" – 3:13
2. "Bernadette and Her Crowd" – 3:40
3. "Replenished" – 4:20
4. "Maiden" – 3:02
5. "Until the Led" – 3:38
6. "Scratch, Scratch, Scratch" – 2:53
7. "Mysterious Tunnel" – 5:42
8. "Arthur Murray" – 4:07
9. "Prick" – 3:08
10. "Woodrow Wilson" – 3:52
11. "Parade" – 7:02
12. "Blanket Over The Head" – 1:26
13. "Square Room" – 4:29
14. "Old Hotel" – 4:20

== Personnel ==
Musicians

- Vic Chesnutt – Acoustic Guitar/Electric Guitar/bass Guitar/Piano/Vocals
- Emmylou Harris – Vocals
- Mike Doster – Bass
- Kurt Wagner – Electric Guitar/Recorder/Lap Steel Guitar/Human Whistle/Vocals
- Tina Chesnutt – Bass/Electric Guitar/Human Whistle/Vocals
- Alex McManus – Euphonium/Electric Guitar/Accordion/Vocals/Human Whistle
- Paul Niehaus – Pedal Steel/Electric Guitar/Baritone Saxophone/Percussion/Human Whistle
- Paul Burch – Accordion/ Vibraphone/ Fender Rhodes/Human Whistle
- Deanna Varagona – Baritone Saxophone/Percussion/Vocals/Human Whistle
- Marc William Trovillion – Bass/Percussion/Human Whistle/Vocals
- Allen Lowrey – Drums/Percussion/Human Whistle/Vocals
- Dennis Cronin – Trumpet/Human Whistle
- Jonathan Marx – Clarinet/Trumpet/Percussion/Human Whistle
- John Delworth – Hammond Organ/ Farfisa Organ/Vocals

Engineering

- Dennis Cronin – Engineer
- Mark Nevers – Engineering/Mixing
- Tommy Dorsey – Mastering
