= Liao Zilan =

- Born: c. 1970 (age 54–55)
- Occupation: Musician
- Instrument(s): Guzheng, harp
- Years active: 1991–present

Liao Zilan (Chinese: 廖 子 岚; pinyin: Liào Zǐlán; born c. 1970) is an international concert circuit performer on the guzheng (Chinese zither). She has performed at the Royal Albert Hall and Royal Festival Hall, and has toured internationally. She also participated at the WOMAD Recording Week in Bath, Somerset.

Liao began to learn the guzheng at the age of three, when she lived in Guangzhou (Canton), Guangdong, China. By the age of nine, she was winning prizes in China, including the prestigious National Youth Music Competition award. She left China with her family in 1983 for the United Kingdom, where she continued her music studies at the Chetham's School of Music in Manchester and at the Royal Academy of Music in London. In addition to the guzheng, she also specialises in the Western concert harp and Chinese traditional dance.

Apart from playing traditional music and works written by Chinese composers, Liao also has had composers outside China write music for her, which has widened her repertoire from classical to contemporary and electronic music. She has collaborated with Peter Gabriel and Nigel Kennedy, and worked with African, Indian and European musicians in the Elekoto Ensemble of Akin Euba. Her collaborative work with other world artists was released in 1995 on Real World Records's A Week or Two in the Real World various artists CD.

She has extensively collaborated with her husband, Jah Wobble. The piece Heaven And Earth was released on the CD with the same title by Island Records in November 1995. She has since contributed both as a musician and cover-art designer to several other of Jah Wobble's recordings, such as The Celtic Poets, The Inspiration of William Blake, Elevator Music 1A, Mu, and Alpha One Three. Chinese Dub, her 2008 project with Wobble, won the Songlines best cross-cultural collaboration album.

She has also released in Europe and the United States notable solo work, such as her guzheng concertos The River, which she performed with the Royal Liverpool Philharmonic Orchestra, and The Five Tone Dragon. She also recorded music for the Oscar-winning film The Last Emperor. She has performed with the flutist Laura Falzon and premiered a work for flute and guzheng with her, composed by the Edward McGuire.

In 2002, Liao began to work with Welsh harpist Elinor Bennett. In 2008, the duo presented compositions for guzheng and harp by the Welsh composer Bill Connor at Liverpool University, as part of the Liverpool's European Capital of Culture 2008 programme.

Liao is the artistic director of Pagoda Arts in Liverpool, and teach the children of the Pagoda Chinese Youth Orchestra on various Chinese musical instruments. Since leading the orchestra in 2013, Liao lead the Orchestra performed at the Wales International Harp Festival, performed for Queen Elizabeth II and Prince Philip during the IBF 2016.

She has also been a visiting teacher at Chetham's School of Music and King's College London.
