= About to Choke =

Studio album by Vic Chesnutt
- Released: 12 November 1996
- Studio: Keane Studios Ltd. (tracks 3, 7, 8 and 11), Vic Chestnutt's home studio (track 6), Rocket Shack Recording (tracks 2, 10 & 12), Full Moon Studios (tracks 1, 4, 5 & 9)
- Genre: Folk rock
- Length: 45:24
- Label: Capitol
- Producer: John De Vries, Mark Lafalce, Vic Chesnutt

Vic Chesnutt chronology
Is the Actor Happy? (1995)	About to Choke (1996)	The Salesman and Bernadette (1998)

Professional ratings
Review scores
Source	Rating
AllMusic	4/5 stars
Chicago Tribune	3.5/4 stars
Christgau's Consumer Guide	(choice cut)
Los Angeles Times	2.5/4 stars
The New Rolling Stone Album Guide	4/5 stars
Pitchfork	7.5/10
Rolling Stone	4/5 stars
Spin	6/10

About to Choke is a 1996 album by Vic Chesnutt, an American singer/songwriter and multi-instrumentalist who was known for his raw, expressive vocals. It was his fifth album overall and his first for a major label. It was released by Capitol Records, and was reissued, in 2010, by Plain Recordings. In 2019, Discogs included About to Choke on its list of the 35 Saddest Albums of All Time.

== Track listing ==
All songs written by Vic Chesnutt

1. "Myrtle" – 3:09
2. "New Town" – 4:09
3. "Ladle" – 4:06
4. "Tarragon" – 2:00
5. "Swelters" – 3:51
6. "(It's No Secret) Satisfaction" – 1:02
7. "Little Vacation" – 3:43
8. "Degenerate" – 4:23
9. "Hot Seat" – 3:39
10. "Giant Sands" – 3:40
11. "Threads" – 4:23
12. "See You Around" – 7:19

== Personnel ==
- Vic Chesnutt: vocals, guitars (acoustic, electric and classical), keyboards, piano, synthesizers, harmonica
- Tina Chesnutt: bass guitar
- Jimmy Davidson: acoustic guitar
- John DeVries: lead guitar, bass guitar
- Alex McManus: acoustic and lead guitar
- Mark La Falce: guitars, drums, percussion, vocals
