= Rising Above Bedlam =

Rising Above Bedlam (On an Elevated Section of Motorway)

Studio album by Jah Wobble's Invaders of the Heart
- Released: 30 September 1991
- Recorded: 1991
- Studios: Oval, Alaska, Greenhouse, London
- Genre: World music
- Length: 51:33
- Labels: Oval (UK); East West (US)
- Producer: Invaders of the Heart

Jah Wobble's Invaders of the Heart chronology
| Without Judgement (1989) | Rising Above Bedlam (On an Elevated Section of Motorway) (1991) | Take Me to God (1994) |

Singles from Rising Above Bedlam
- 1. "Bomba" Released: 1990; 2. "Erzulie" Released: 1991; 3. "Visions of You" Released: 1992; 4. "Ungodly Kingdom" Released: 1992

Rising Above Bedlam is an album by Jah Wobble's Invaders of the Heart, released by Oval Records in 1991. The album peaked at number 121 on the ARIA Charts.

The album was a shortlisted nominee for the 1992 Mercury Prize.

== Critical reception ==
Professional ratings
Review scores
| Source | Rating |
|---|---|
| AllMusic | 4/5 stars |
| Calgary Herald | B+ |

Trouser Press called the album "ambitious" and "a refreshing departure from some of the flat, occasionally tedious and self-conscious material [Wobble] lobbed out in the '80s." The Rough Guide To Rock praised "Visions of You" and "Bomba," writing that they made the album "worthwhile."

== Track listing ==
| No. | Title | Writer(s) | Length |
|---|---|---|---|
| 1. | "Visions of You" (featuring the vocals of Sinéad O'Connor) | Jah Wobble, Justin Adams, John Reynolds | 5:34 |
| 2. | "Relight the Flame" | Wobble, Adams, Natacha Atlas | 4:13 |
| 3. | "Bomba" | Wobble, Adams, Mark Ferda, Atlas, Nick Burton, Dawson Miller | 5:54 |
| 4. | "Ungodly Kingdom" | Wobble, Adams, Ferda | 4:31 |
| 5. | "Rising Above Bedlam" | Wobble, Adams, Michel Schoots | 3:47 |
| 6. | "Erzulie" | Wobble, Adams, Atlas | 7:02 |
| 7. | "Everyman's an Island" | Wobble, Adams, Ferda | 6:29 |
| 8. | "Soledad" | Wobble, Adams, Atlas | 5:46 |
| 9. | "Sweet Divinity" | Wobble, Adams, Ferda | 4:17 |
| 10. | "Wonderful World" | Wobble, Adams | 4:00 |

== Personnel ==
- Jah Wobble – bass, vocals, keyboards, drum programming, timbales
- Justin Adams – electric guitar, Spanish guitar, Arabic percussion, saz, vocals
- Mark Ferda – keyboards, drum programming, sampler, effects
- Natacha Atlas – vocals
- Sinéad O'Connor – vocals
