= Marconi Union =

English ambient music band

- Origin: Manchester
- Genres: Ambient
- Years active: 2003–present
- Labels: All Saints Records; Just Music
- Members: Jamie Crossley; Duncan Meadows
- Past members: Richard Talbot
- Website: MarconiUnion.com

Marconi Union are an English ambient music band formed in Manchester in 2003 by Richard Talbot and Jamie Crossley. In 2011, their live keyboardist Duncan Meadows became a full time member.

== History ==
Marconi Union formed in 2003, when Talbot and Crossley met while working in a Manchester record shop. They have a reputation for being somewhat elusive as they frequently refuse interview requests and show little interest in promoting themselves despite having attracted considerable critical acclaim. More recently they have given several online interviews and appeared in Electronic Sound Magazine. Their self-produced debut album, Under Wires and Searchlights, appeared in 2003 on the independent label Ochre Records. They were picked up by All Saints Records shortly after.

In 2005, they released Distance which featured a darker, more electronic sound. The follow-up, A Lost Connection, was originally slated for release on All Saints, but the band became victims of label politics following its takeover by Warner Bros. Frustrated by the delays and with two full-length albums recorded and awaiting release, Talbot and Crossley launched their own digital label, MU Transmissions, which started to sell their music through their website. Starting in 2008, Marconi Union gave away 12 downloads on their website, each of which was available for one month only. The tracks were completely exclusive and included outtakes, unreleased tracks and alternate mixes. In 2009 these were released as the compilation album 13. Also in 2009, Marconi Union released a new album, Tokyo on the German-based label Binemusic. According to press releases and reviews, the album was inspired by images of the Japanese city. In 2010, A Lost Connection was remastered and released on CD. In the same year, the group announced Duncan Meadows, their live keyboardist, had joined on a permanent basis.

In July 2011, a new album, Beautifully Falling Apart (Ambient Transmissions Vol:1) was released on Just Music. Musically this was a diversion from previous releases, being largely beatless and with a greater emphasis on texture. Despite this move away from the more commercial aspects of their earlier work, it was met with critical acclaim.

Different Colours is their first album featuring Meadows as a full-time member, and once again differed in approach and sound from its predecessors. This time, the focus was on tightly structured arrangements, assimilating ideas from jazz and soundtrack composers like Bernard Herrmann with the intention of producing a more soulful sound. Different Colours achieved greater commercial success than their previous releases, and featured in several best of the year lists. The long-running radio show Echoes named it CD of the month.

In September 2012, Marconi Union appeared at the annual Punkt! Festival in Kristiansand, Norway, at the invitation of Brian Eno. As per the Festivals format instead of performing a regular set they performed two live remixes, one of Cyclobe and the other of S.C.U.M.

Over a period of two years, predating the arrival of Meadows, Talbot and Crossley also collaborated with Jah Wobble; the results being released as the album Anomic in June 2013.

In 2015 a limited edition E.P. cassette titled Departures was released, which was later made available on major digital streaming platforms in 2020. 2016 saw the release of their next album Ghost Stations. In 2017 an expanded edition of the Tokyo album was released, entitled Tokyo+. Their next album was Dead Air released in 2019.

On 1 September 2021, the group announced the release of their new single, "Strata". This is the first single from their album Signals, released in November 2021.

== "Weightless" ==
On 16 October 2011, Marconi Union released "Weightless", an 8-minute track in collaboration with Lyz Cooper, of the British Academy of Sound Therapy, and Radox Spa. The song features guitar, piano and manipulated field recordings. It is punctuated throughout by low tones that supposedly induce a trance-like state.

It was reported in a study conducted at the Sussex Innovation Centre in Brighton that listening to the track reduced anxiety of the patients by up to 65%, being 11% better at inducing relaxation than other relaxing music. In November 2011, Marconi Union were featured in Time magazine's list of Inventors of the Year for recording "Weightless", describing it as "the world's most relaxing song". In January 2017 it charted in the Billboard charts. Despite the success of Weightless, the band has shied away from playing it live, seeing it as a separate project, and has concentrated on playing new material and selections from their critically acclaimed back catalogue.

== Other activities ==
Marconi Union has worked on several visual arts projects. In 2015, they participated in "Weightless / Endless", a collaboration in association with the Marina Abramovic Institute. Later that same year, they provided the soundtrack to "A Distant Light", a large-scale installation shown in Oxford Street, London in association with the Selfridges department store. Amongst others, they have remixed Max Richter, Digitonal and Vok and have been remixed by Biosphere, Steve Jansen (Japan) and others.

== Discography ==
=== Studio albums ===
- Under Wires and Searchlights (Ochre Records 2003)
- Distance (All Saints Records 2005)
- A Lost Connection (MU Transmissions 2008)
- Tokyo (Binemusic 2009; Expanded edition Tokyo+ Just Music 2017)
- Beautifully Falling Apart (Ambient Transmissions Vol.1) (Just Music 2011)
- Different Colours (Just Music 2012)
- Weightless (Ambient Transmissions Vol.2) (Self-released limited 2012; Just Music 2014)
- Anomic Jah Wobble & Marconi Union (30 Hertz 2013)
- Ghost Stations (Just Music 2016)
- Dead Air (Just Music 2019)
- Signals (Just Music 2021)
- The Fear of Never Landing (Just Music 2025)
- Multiforms (Ambient Transmissions Vol.3) (Just Music 2026)

=== Compilation ===
- 13 (MU Transmissions 2009)

=== E.P. ===
- Departures (Chemical Tapes limited cassette 2015; Ambient Zone 2020)

=== Singles ===
- Strata (Just Music 2021)

Year	Album	Peak positions
Year	Album	FR
2011	"Weightless"	67

=== Remixes ===
- Max Richter – "Dream 13 (Marconi Union Remix)" (Deutsche Grammophon 2016)
- Antonymes – "Delicate Power (Marconi Union Remix)" (Hidden Shoal 2016)
