= Spinner (album) =

Studio album by Brian Eno and Jah Wobble
- Released: 1995
- Recorded: 1994 & 1995
- Studios: Transfermation, London
- Genres: Ambient, instrumental rock
- Length: 51:00
- Label: All Saints Records
- Producers: Jah Wobble, Brian Eno (initial tracks)

Brian Eno chronology
Neroli (1993)	Spinner (1995)	Original Soundtracks 1 (1995)

Professional ratings
Review scores
Source	Rating
AllMusic	2.5/5 stars
Down Beat	4/5 stars
Entertainment Weekly	A−
The Guardian	3/5 stars
The Line of Best Fit	6.5/10
Pitchfork	7.7/10
Rolling Stone	(1995) (2004)
Trouser Press	favourable

Spinner is an instrumental album by British musicians Brian Eno and Jah Wobble (a.k.a. John Wardle), released in 1995.

== Track listing ==
All initial compositions by Brian Eno; tracks 2, 3, 5, 6, 9 and 10 with additional credit to Jah Wobble.

1. "Where We Lived" – 2:59
2. "Like Organza" – 2:44
3. "Steam" – 3:16
4. "Garden Recalled" – 3:21
5. "Marine Radio" – 5:04
6. "Unusual Balance" – 5:23
7. "Space Diary 1" – 1:51
8. "Spinner" – 2:54
9. "Transmitter and Trumpet" – 8:41
10. "Left Where It Fell" – 7:02
11. (Hidden track later released on The Drop as "Iced World") – 8:42

== Overview ==
The music on Spinner has its origins in the Eno-penned soundtrack to the Derek Jarman biographical 60-minute movie Glitterbug, which was released in 1994, shortly after Jarman's death.

The movie was an abstract montage composed of Super-8 excerpts from his personal video-diaries, going behind-the-scenes of many of his movies from the late sixties right up to the end of the eighties.

Eno composed most of the soundtrack in his Kilburn studio, working directly onto digital stereo. The music stayed in the film; it was never released as a separate entity. Eno explains "I had intended to collect the music as a soundtrack record, but in the end a lot of it didn't make much sense without the film".

In 1995, Eno handed the master-tapes to Wobble. "He received from me a number of stereo tapes and did what he does – spanning the gamut from leaving them completely alone (such as "Garden Recalled"); playing along (such as "Like Organza"); or using them as atmospheres for entirely new compositions (such as "Steam")".

Eno did not participate in any co-production on Spinner at all; it was all done by Wobble. Eno said "I didn't even hear it all till it was finished. I had no input at all on that stage of it. Everything that he put on, he produced. Anything you hear looming around in the back is probably what I produced".

Some of Eno's thoughts on the album in its final stages can be found in the last section ("Wobbly letter") of the appendix of Eno's published diary, A Year with Swollen Appendices. This section is a copy of a letter from Eno to Dominic Norman-Taylor of All Saints Records, describing Eno's opinions of Jah Wobble's mixes and treatments of the tracks. Several of the tracks are given their working titles ("Unusual Balance", for example, is referred to as "Scrapy"). The letter gives hints as to the methods used by Eno and Wobble in creating the album, with Eno providing many of the original tracks, which Wobble then treated and sequenced.

The finished product is a fusion of ambient, instrumental rock, and dub. Eno referred to the last track as an example of what he called "Unwelcome Jazz. Because for the last 3 or 4 years, really, I've been writing these pieces of music, which sound like some peculiar take on jazz. They don't really sound like jazz, they obviously have some kind of influence from jazz. But most of the people I played them to don't really like them – so I call it 'Unwelcome Jazz' [laughs]".

== Personnel ==
Credits taken from album booklet.

- Brian Eno – synthesizer, treatments
- Jah Wobble – bass (on all tracks except 1, 4, 7), drums (tracks 3, 6, 10), keyboards (5, 9, 10), atmospheres (8, 9)
- Mark Ferda – atmospheres (3, 8–10), keyboards (3), percussion (10)
- Justin Adams – guitar (3, 6, 9)
- Richard Bailey – drums (5)
- Jaki Liebezeit – drums (8, 9)
- Sussan Deihim – vocals (6)

Production

- Brian Eno – initial soundtrack recording and production
- Jah Wobble and Mark Ferda – additional recording and mixing, final production
- Mark Ferda – mixing, assistant recording and production
- Brian Eno and David Coppenhall – cover art

== Versions ==
Country	Label	Cat. no.	Media	Release date
UK	All Saints	ASCD23	CD/LP	1995, 1999, 2003
US	Gyroscope	8190 6614-2	CD	1995
?	All Saints	571495	CD	2006
?	Hannibal	1495	CD	2006

== Anthologies ==
- Sonora Portraits 1, a compilation CD accompanying a book of essays and interviews edited by Claudio Chianura & Giampiero Bigazzi, features the track "Left Where It Fell", as well as a few selections from Glitterbug (Materiali Sonori, MASO CD 90110, 1999).
- The tracks "Spinner" and "Left Where It Fell" appear on Jah Wobble's 2004 anthology I Could Have Been a Contender.
