= Jah Wobble =

English musician (born 1958)

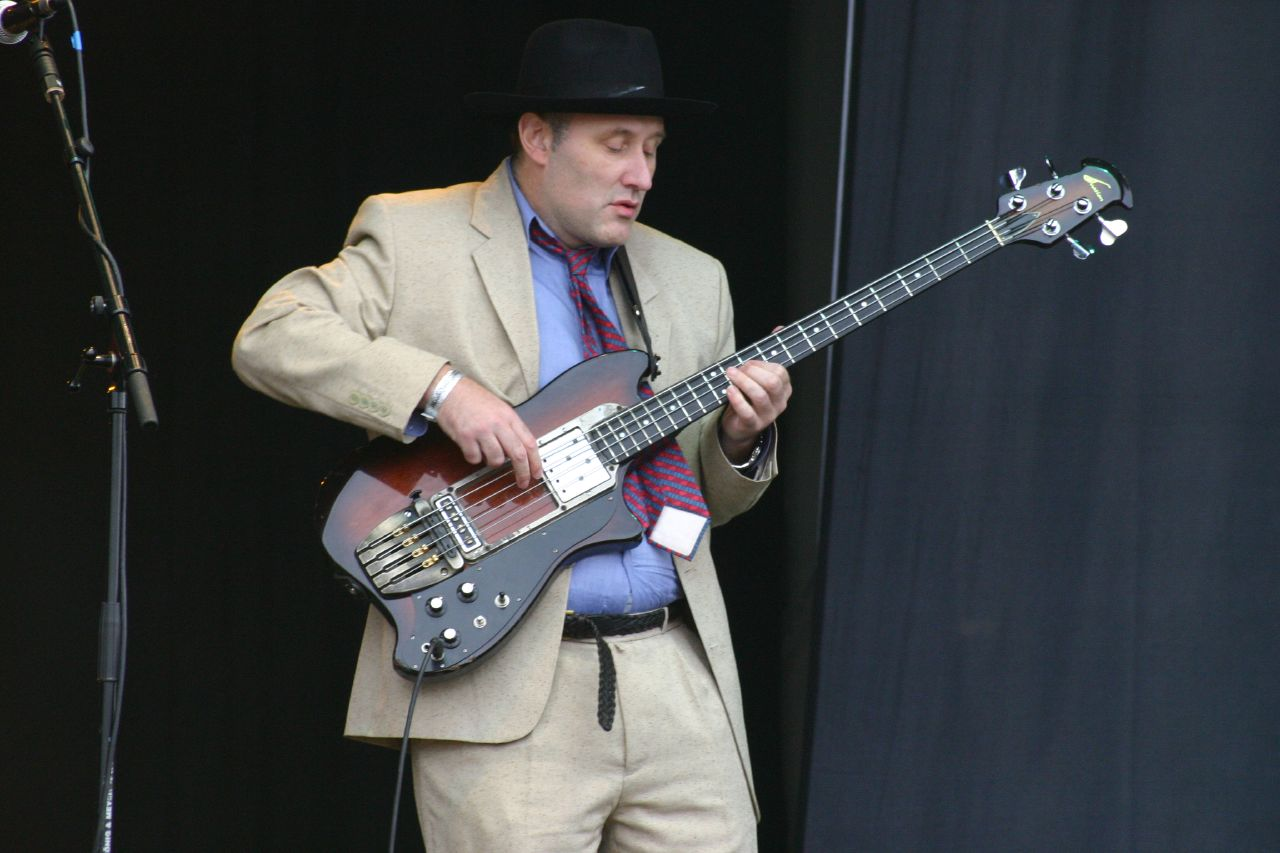
- Wobble in 2005

Background information
- Born: John Joseph Wardle; 11 August 1958 (age 68); Stepney, London, England
- Genres: Post-punk; dub; world; experimental rock; electronic
- Occupation: Musician
- Instruments: Bass guitar; vocals; keyboards; drums
- Years active: 1978–1984, 1986–present
- Labels: 30 Hertz; Island
- Website: jahwobble.com

John Joseph Wardle (known by the stage name Jah Wobble; born 11 August 1958) is an English bass guitarist and singer. He was the original bass player in Public Image Ltd (PiL) in the late 1970s and early 1980s; he left the band after two albums.

Following his departure from PiL, he developed a solo career. In 2012, he reunited with fellow PiL guitarist Keith Levene for Metal Box in Dub and the album Yin & Yang. Since 2013, he has been one of the featured pundits on Sunday morning's The Virtual Jukebox segment of BBC Radio 5 Live's Up All Night with Dotun Adebayo. His autobiography, Memoirs of a Geezer, was published in 2009.

== Early life ==
Wardle was born on 11 August 1958 in Stepney, East London. His father, Harry Eugene Wardle, worked as a postman, while his mother, Kathleen Bridget (née Fitzgibbon), was a school and County Hall secretary. Wobble grew up with his family in Whitechapel's Clichy Estate in London's East End. He is a long-time friend of John Lydon (Johnny Rotten), whom he had met in the 1970s at London's Kingsway College. The two formed half of the group of friends known as "The Four Johns", along with John Gray and John Simon Ritchie (Sid Vicious). Jah Wobble adopted his stage name after a drunken Sid Vicious mumbled Wardle's name, which he kept, noting that "people would never forget it."

== Musical career ==
In his early life and career, by his own admission, Wardle was given to occasional bouts of aggression, exacerbated by heavy drinking and drug use. As a result, he ended up living in a squat with John Gray in West London, while Lydon formed The Sex Pistols. With admittedly large "builder's hands", he had experimented with the guitar, but found playing bass a more connected and whole body experience, influenced in part by admiring Bob Marley's and The Wailers bassist Aston "Family Man" Barrett on stage in 1975. Wardle was as critical of his friend Vicious's bass playing as John Lydon, and had hence played in experimentation sessions with Lydon. After he burned the furniture of his squat-mates in order to stay warm, they left him alone there with a mattress, a headboard and his Music Man-copy bass.

=== Public Image Ltd (PiL) ===
Following the Sex Pistols' break-up, Lydon approached Wobble about forming a band. Both had similarly broad musical tastes, and were avid fans of reggae and world music. The band began rehearsing together in May 1978; in July Lydon named the band Public Image (PiL) (the "Ltd" was added several months later), after the Muriel Spark novel The Public Image. Wobble's bass playing drew heavily on dub, which has remained an important feature of his music. Prior to the break up of the Sex Pistols, Wobble and Lydon had experimented musically during which time he wrote a simple repetitive bassline which Lydon used to write the song "Public Image". In October 1978 "Public Image" was released as PiL's first single and reached number 9 on the UK charts and making an impact internationally. Wobble has stated that the first PiL album was recorded so quickly due in part to the bassist's altercations with a sound engineer and men at a nearby pub. He has dismissed claims accusing him of extreme malice, such as setting fire to the former drummer for The Fall, Karl Burns, while Burns was session drumming for PiL.

Wobble co-wrote and contributed bass and drums to PiL's second album Metal Box, which was released in 1979. He grew increasingly frustrated by the lacklustre creative atmosphere in the band, which he felt stifled his artistic ambitions and PiL's creative potential. Besides differences in artistic vision, further conflicts were brought on in part by heavy drug and alcohol abuse in the band. Wobble then recorded his debut album The Legend Lives On... Jah Wobble in "Betrayal", making unauthorised use of material from Metal Box for which he was fired from PiL in late 1980.

=== Early post-PiL years ===
Soon after leaving PiL, Wobble formed The Human Condition with guitarist Dave "Animal" Maltby and PiL's original drummer, Jim Walker. The Human Condition toured the UK, Europe, and US in 1981, and made two cassette-only releases of their live shows (Live at the Collegiate Theatre and Live in Europe). The post-PiL years saw Wobble also collaborating with Can members Holger Czukay and Jaki Liebezeit on Czukay's solo projects (notably On the Way to the Peak of Normal and Rome Remains Rome) and Full Circle (released in 1984).

In 1983, Wardle appeared on the LP Snake Charmer billed as a co-leader alongside guitarist The Edge of U2, Czukay, Liebezeit, and producer François Kevorkian.

Jah Wobble's Invaders of the Heart was formed in 1982. The original line-up was Ollie Marland (who went on to become Tina Turner's musical director) on keys, Annie Whitehead on trombone, Neville Murray on percussion and a musician named only as Cliff, on drums. By 1983 Lee Partis was the drummer. Trumpeter Harry Beckett and pedal steel player B. J. Cole regularly performed with the group.

By 1985 Jah Wobble's heavy drinking and drunken brawls were having an effect on his life. Halfway through the recording of the album Psalms (October 1986), Wobble stopped drinking. From then through to the present day he has remained 'clean and sober'.

He then did a variety of day jobs, whilst continuing to perform and record his music in what spare time he had. These jobs included a long stretch with the London Underground. In an oft-quoted tale, it is related that he once, at Tower Hill Underground Station via the public address system, regaled commuters with the deadpan announcement, "I used to be somebody. I repeat, I used to be somebody."

By 1987, due to the repeated prompting of his friend and former bandmate, percussionist Neville Murray, Wobble reformed The Invaders of the Heart. Armed with a live recording of a concert he had made with a new line-up of musicians during a European tour in 1988, Wobble travelled to New York City's New Music Seminar in 1989 to get back into the music industry. Wobble was able to secure an eleventh-hour record deal with a small European record label. The live album, Without Judgement, was recorded in the Netherlands and was released in November 1989.

Following the relative success of Without Judgement, Wobble has collaborated with many musicians - Brian Eno among them - and his explorations into world music predated much of the genre's popularity. Wobble hit his commercial peak with 1991's Rising Above Bedlam. While the album did not chart, it spawned four singles including his first top-40 hit, Visions of You, featuring Sinéad O'Connor. Jah Wobble's 1994 album Take Me to God was influenced by world music genres and contributions from a variety of artists of diverse cultural backgrounds, including Baaba Maal, Dolores O'Riordan, and Chaka Demus, and was also a critical and commercial success.

=== Mid-1990s to present ===
Although he has released recordings since the late seventies, Wobble has been particularly prolific from the mid-1990s to the present. He now runs his own label, 30 Hertz Records, and tours regularly throughout the UK and Europe with his current band, Jah Wobble & The Invaders of the Heart. His music has spanned a number of genres, including ambient music and dance music, and in 2003, reworkings of traditional English folk songs.

Wobble was part of the industrial music supergroup The Damage Manual, which formed in 2000 and consisted of Wobble on bass alongside former PiL and Killing Joke drummer Martin Atkins, Killing Joke guitarist Geordie Walker, and vocalist Chris Connelly (who had previously worked with Atkins as part of two other industrial music supergroups, Pigface and Murder Inc., the latter of which also featured Walker). He appeared on the group's self-titled debut album as well as the EP One, both of which were released on Atkins' Invisible Records label, but subsequently left the group after declining to participate in their tour of the U.S.

A collaboration with his wife, the Chinese-born guzheng player Zi Lan Liao, was entitled Chinese Dub. He also performed at the 2008 Rhythm Festival.

Jah Wobble and the Chinese Dub Orchestra won the Cross-Cultural Collaboration category, for their album Chinese Dub, in the inaugural Songlines Music Awards, announced on 1 May 2009, which were the new world music awards organised by the UK based magazine, Songlines.

In September 2009, John Lydon reformed PiL for a series of concerts in late 2009. Despite Lydon's invitation to join, Jah Wobble did not feature in the line-up, since he considered the wages offered insufficient and disagreed with the choice of venues.

At an impromptu appearance at the Musicport Festival in Bridlington Spa on 24 October 2010, where they were joined by vocalist "Johnny Rotter" of the Sex Pistols Experience, Wobble renewed his association with former PiL guitarist Keith Levene.

In 2011, Wobble collaborated with Julie Campbell, alias Warp Records artist LoneLady in a project called Psychic Life. The debut album, Psychic Life, was inspired by disco, post-punk and psychogeography, and released by Cherry Red Records on 14 November 2011. Keith Levene contributed to three tracks on the album. A digital-only EP, Psychic Life, fronted by the song "Tightrope", was released in October 2011.

In early 2012, after some planned Japan gigs were cancelled because of visa problems, Wobble and Levene played various UK clubs as Metal Box in Dub. The visa issues were resolved and they played Fuji Rock festival in July 2012. This was followed by the release of a four-song, eponymous EP. An album entitled Yin & Yang was released in November 2012.

Wobble has also collaborated with the British ambient group Marconi Union, the results of which were released as an album called Anomic on 30 Hertz records in June 2013. In October 2013, 30 Hertz Records released Odds & Sods & Epilogues, an illustrated book/CD of Jah Wobble's poetry.

In 2015, Cherry Red Records released Redux, a six-CD box set that spans nearly four decades of Wobble's music. It includes new tracks Merry Go Round and Let's Go Psycho. In May 2015, Jah Wobble & The Invaders of the Heart embarked on an extensive six-month UK tour. They recorded the album The Usual Suspects which was released on 3m Music in 2017. A series of gigs in England from January to May 2017 was announced.

== Other activities ==
Jah Wobble studied part-time for four years at Birkbeck, University of London, graduating in 2000 with an upper second-class honours degree in the humanities.

His autobiography, entitled Memoirs of a Geezer: Music, Life, Mayhem (Serpent's Tail books, London), was released in September 2009. It was well received by critics. He also writes occasional book reviews for The Independent.

== Personal life ==
Wobble has four children, including music producer and bassist with the Loose Articles, Natalie Wardle, from his first marriage, Hayley Angel Holt, writer, director and actress and two sons with his second wife, the Chinese-born guzheng player and harpist Zilan Liao. Wobble was brought up a Roman Catholic but later converted to Mahayana Buddhism.

== List of collaborators ==
Jah Wobble past and present collaborators (listed alphabetically)
- Justin Adams
- African Head Charge
- Afro Celt Sound System
- Natacha Atlas
- Najma Akhtar
- Shahin Badar
- Ginger Baker
- Harry Beckett
- Bel Canto
- Clive Bell
- Björk
- Bomb the Bass
- Ken Boothe
- Julie Campbell
- Liz Carter
- Gary Clail
- Chris Cookson
- Cathal Coughlan
- Holger Czukay
- The Damage Manual
- Chaka Demus
- Anneli Drecker
- Ronnie Drew
- The Edge
- Polly Eltes
- Brian Eno
- Gavin Friday
- Paul Gilroy
- David Harrow
- Graham Haynes
- Ozark Henry
- Joji Hirota
- David Holmes
- Joolz
- François Kevorkian
- Keiko Kitamura
- Bill Laswell
- Zi Lan Liao
- Jaki Liebezeit
- Clea Llewellyn
- Mark Lusardi
- Baaba Maal
- Madredeus
- Dave (Animal) Maltby
- Ben Mandelson
- Marconi Union
- Ollie Marland
- Massive Attack
- Nils Petter Molvær
- Neville Murray
- Shara Nelson
- Dolores O'Riordan
- Sinéad O'Connor
- One Dove
- Oui 3
- The Orb
- Pagoda Chinese Youth Orchestra
- Evan Parker
- Primal Scream
- Jean Pierre Rasle
- Julianne Regan
- John Reynolds
- Saffron (singer)
- Mark Sanders
- Pharoah Sanders
- Michel Schoots (Magic Stick)
- The Shamen
- Adrian Sherwood
- Bob Shipton
- Abdel Ali Slimani
- Suggs
- Robin Thompson
- Spikey Tee
- Winston Tong
- Yulduz Usmanova
- Holly Valance
- Cat von Trapp
- Geordie Walker
- Andrew Weatherall
- Annie Whitehead
- Brett Wickens
- Leslie Winer
- Bernie Worrell

== Discography ==
List of studio albums, with selected chart positions, sales figures and certifications
Title	Album details	Peak chart positions	
Title	Album details	UK	AUS
The Legend Lives On... Jah Wobble in "Betrayal"	Released: 1980; Label: Virgin		
V.I.E.P.	Released: 1980; Label: Virgin		
Jah Wobble's Bedroom Album	Released: 1983; Label: Lago Records		
Tradewinds	Released: 1986; Label: Lago Records		
Psalms	Released: 1987; Label: Wob Records		
Without Judgement	Released: 1990		
Rising Above Bedlam	Released: 1991; Label: Oval		121
Take Me to God	Released: 1994; Label: Island	13	160
Spinner (with Brian Eno)	Released: 1995; Label: All Saints	71	
Heaven and Earth	Released: 1995; Label: Island Records		
The Inspiration of William Blake	Released: 1996; Label: All Saints Records, 30 Hertz Records		
Requiem	Released: 1997; Label: 30 Hertz Records		
The Light Programme	Released: 1998; Label: 30 Hertz Records		
Umbra Sumus	Released: 1998; Label: 30 Hertz Records		
Deep Space	Released: 1999; Label: 30 Hertz Records		
Fly	Released: 2002; Label: 30 Hertz Records		
The Sound of Jah Wobble	Released: 2002; Label: Digital Vision		
Fureur	Released: 2003; Label: EastWest; Notes: Soundtrack		
Elevator Music Volume 1A	Released: 2004; Label: 30 Hertz Records		
Mu	Released: 2005; Label: Trojan Records		
Alpha-One-Three	Released: 2006; Label: 30 Hertz Records		
Heart and Soul	Released: 2007; Label: Trojan Records		
Car Ad Music	Released: 2009; Label: 30 Hertz Records		
Welcome to My World	Released: 2010; Label: 30 Hertz Records		
7	Released: 2011; Label:		
Dub the World	Released: 2012; Label: Ded Good Music		
Odds & Sods & Epilogues: Illustrated Book of Poetry with CD	Released: 2013; Label: 30 Hertz Records		
Access All Areas	Released: 2015; Label: Edsel Records		
Cover Versions	Released: 2015; Label: 30 Hertz Records, Cherry Red Records		
The Butterfly Effect	Released: 2018; Label: Jah Wobble Records		
Dream World	Released: 2018; Label: Jah Wobble Records		
Nocturne in the City (Ambient Jazz Grooves)	Released: 2020; Label: Jah Wobble Records		
End of Lockdown Dub	Released: 2020; Label: Jah Wobble Records		
Metal Box - Rebuilt in Dub	Released: 2021; Label: Cleopatra		
Guanyin	Released: 2021; Label: Jah Wobble Records		
Dark Luminosity: The 21st Century Collection	Released: 2023; Label: 30 Hertz Records		
The Bus Routes of South London	Released: 2023; Label: Jah Wobble Records		
Thames Symphony	Released: 2023; Label: Jah Wobble Records		
A Brief History of Now	Released: 2023; Label: Cleopatra		

- Snake Charmer (with The Edge & Holger Czukay) (1983)
- Neon Moon (with Ollie Marland) (1985)
- The Celtic Poets (1997)
- Full Moon over the Shopping Mall (with the Invaders of the Heart) (2000)
- Beach Fervour Spare (with Deep Space) (2000)
- Molam Dub (with the Invaders of the Hearts and Molam Lao) (2001)
- Passage to Hades (with Evan Parker) (2001)
- Radioaxiom: A Dub Transmission (with Bill Laswell) (2001)
- Shout at the Devil (with Temple of Sound) (2002)
- English Roots Music (with the Invaders of the Heart) (2003)
- Five Beat (with Deep Space) (2004)
- Jay Wobble & the English Roots Band (2006)
- Chinese Dub (with the Chinese Dub Ensemble) (2008)
- Japanese Dub (with the Nippon Dub Ensemble) (2010)
- Psychic Life (with Julie Campbell) (2011)
- EP (with Keith Levene) (2012)
- Yin & Yang (with Keith Levene) (2012)
- Kingdom of Fitzrovia (with Bill Sharpe) (2013)
- Anomic (with Marconi Union) (2013)
- Inspiration (with PJ Higgins) (2014)
- Redux (2015)
- Everything Is No Thing (with the Invaders of the Heart) (2016)
- Maghrebi Jazz (with Momo) (2018)
- Realm of Spells (with Bill Laswell) (2019)
- Ocean Blue Waves (with the Invaders of the Heart) (2019)
- Youth meets Jah Wobble Acid Punk Dub Apocalypse (with Youth Martin) (2020)
- Old Fashioned Ways (with Ken Boothe) (2025)
- Mystic Liverpool: The Beatles Psychedelic Psongbook (with Tian Qiyi) (2026)

=== Live and compilation albums ===
- 30 Hertz: A Collection of Diverse Works from a Creative Genius (2000)
- Largely Live in Hartlepool & Manchester (with Deep Space) (2001)
- The Early Years (2001)
- Solaris: Live in Concert (2002)
- Live in Leuven (with Jaki Liebezeit & Philip Jeck) (2004)
- I Could Have Been a Contender (2004)
- Redux Anthology 1978 - 2015 (2015)
- Dark Luminosity (2023)

=== Singles and EPs ===
Year	Title	Peak chart positions			Album
Year	Title	UK	AUS	US Mod Rock	Album
1978	"Dreadlock Don't Deal in Wedlock"	—	—	—	N/A
1978	"Steel Leg v. the Electric Dread" (with Don Letts, Keith Levene & Vince Bracken)	—	—	—	EP only
1979	"Dan MacArthur"	—	—	—	The Legend Lives On... Jah Wobble in "Betrayal"
1980	"Betrayal"	—	—	—	The Legend Lives On... Jah Wobble in "Betrayal"
1980	"V.I.E.P. featuring Blueberry Hill"	—	—	—	The Legend Lives On... Jah Wobble in "Betrayal"
1981	"How Much Are They?"	—	—	—	Full Circle (with Jaki Liebezeit & Holger Czukay)
1982	"Fading"	—	—	—	Bedroom Album
1982	"A Long, Long Way"	—	—	—	Bedroom Album
1983	"Invaders of the Heart"	—	—	—	Bedroom Album
1983	"Body Music Mokili" (with Ben Mandelson)	—	—	—	N/A
1984	"Voodoo" (with Ollie Marland & Polly Eltes)	—	—	—	N/A
1985	"Love Mystery"	—	—	—	Neon Moon (with Ollie Marland)
1985	"Blow Out"	—	—	—	N/A
1986	"Between Two Frequencies" (with Brett Wickens)	—	—	—	N/A
1987	"Island Paradise"	—	—	—	Psalms
1989	"The Unspoken Word" (as Invaders of the Heart)	—	—	—	Fuse II – World Dance Music (Various Artists)
1990	"Bomba"	—	—	—	Rising Above Bedlam (as Jah Wobble's Invaders of the Heart)
1991	"Erzulie"	—	—	—	Rising Above Bedlam (as Jah Wobble's Invaders of the Heart)
1992	"Visions of You" (featuring Sinéad O'Connor)	35	94	10	Rising Above Bedlam (as Jah Wobble's Invaders of the Heart)
1992	"Ungodly Kingdom"	—	—	—	Rising Above Bedlam (as Jah Wobble's Invaders of the Heart)
1994	"Becoming More Like God" (featuring Anneli Drecker)	36	190	—	Take Me to God (as Jah Wobble's Invaders of the Heart)
1994	"The Sun Does Rise" (featuring Dolores O'Riordan)	41	—	22	Take Me to God (as Jah Wobble's Invaders of the Heart)
1994	"Amor"	76	—	—	Take Me to God (as Jah Wobble's Invaders of the Heart)
1997	"Magical Thought"	—	—	—	The Light Programme
1998	"I Offer You Everything"	—	—	—	Umbra Sumus
1998	"Mount Zion"	—	—	—	Umbra Sumus
2009	"Get Carter"	—	—	—	N/A
2012	"Mississippi"	—	—	—	Yin and Yang (with Keith Levene)
2014	"Watch How You Walk"	—	—	—	Inspiration (with PJ Higgins)
"—" denotes releases that did not chart or were not released.

== Bibliography ==
Further reading:

- Hämäläinen, Jyrki "Spider" (2020). Killing Joke: Are You Receiving?. Milton Keynes: New Haven Publishing Ltd. ISBN 978-1912587407.
