= Little (album) =

Studio album by Vic Chesnutt
- Released: 1990
- Genre: Folk rock
- Length: 43:48
- Labels: Texas Hotel; New West
- Producer: Michael Stipe

Vic Chesnutt chronology
Little (1990)	West of Rome (1991)

Little is the debut album by Vic Chesnutt, released in 1990. Produced by R.E.M. frontman Michael Stipe, it was Chesnutt's first solo release. The album was re-released on July 5, 2004, on the New West Records label and included five bonus tracks.

== Overview ==
Deciding to pursue a solo career after the band La-Di-Das broke up, Chesnutt would play solo at the 40 Watt Club. It was there that R.E.M. frontman Michael Stipe first spotted Chesnutt and helped him to produce his first album. Little was recorded in one day: October 6, 1988, and the session was produced by Michael Stipe at John Keane's studio in Athens, Georgia. It was released on Texas Hotel Records in 1990.

== Reception ==
Professional ratings
Review scores
Source	Rating
AllMusic	3.5/5 stars
The Encyclopedia of Popular Music	3/5 stars
The New Rolling Stone Album Guide	3/5 stars

Pitchfork Media gave Little an 8.6, stating:

The most elemental of any of Chesnutt's albums, it features just his warbly voice and precarious acoustic guitar, occasionally accompanied by Stipe's keyboard flourishes. As its title suggests, Little is about Chesnutt's Pike County childhood, a theme he would return to repeatedly as if thumbing worn and creased snapshots found at the bottom of a drawer. "Rabbit Box" begins, "While I was still in elementary school I discovered Daddy's tools," following the songwriter as he builds a rabbit box out of scrap lumber, but only catches a cat and a possum.

== Track listing ==
All songs written by Vic Chesnutt

1. "Isadora Duncan" – 4:37
2. "Danny Carlisle" – 2:59
3. "Gepetto" – 2:29
4. "Bakersfield" – 2:39
5. "Mr. Reilly" – 3:23
6. "Rabbit Box" – 2:17
7. "Speed Racer" – 4:44
8. "Soft Picasso" – 3:30
9. "Independence Day" – 3:53
10. "Stevie Smith" – 2:03

Bonus tracks on the 2004 CD release on New West Records

1. "Bernadette" – 1:29
2. "Vernon" – 2:59
3. "Acting So Bad" – 2:41
4. "Miss Mary" – 1:53
5. "Elberton Fair" – 2:35

== Track notes ==
"Stevie Smith" is named after the English poet and novelist Stevie Smith. It is a musical adaptation of her poem "Not Waving but Drowning".

== Personnel ==
- Vic Chesnutt – guitar, vocals
- Michael Stipe – keyboards, production
- Moira Nelligan – vocals and fiddle on "Stevie Smith"
- Heli Willey – vocals on "Stevie Smith"
- Joe Willey – banjo on "Stevie Smith"
