= Tim Sommer =

American music journalist and producer

- Born: Timothy Andrew Sommer; March 5, 1962 (age 64); New York City, New York, U.S.
- Occupations: Music journalist; musician; record producer; A&R representative
- Years active: 1980s–present
- Label: Atlantic

Timothy Andrew Sommer (born March 5, 1962) is an American music journalist, musician, record producer and former Atlantic Records A&R representative. He was the bass player for the slowcore/dreampop band Hugo Largo.

== Music career ==
Prior to forming Hugo Largo, Sommer hosted Noise the Show, a pioneering New York City-based hardcore punk radio show aired during 1981–82 on WNYU.

Sommer was a member of the Glenn Branca Ensemble, and played alongside Sonic Youth's Thurston Moore in the New York City punk rock band Even Worse. He was also an original member of Swans, but never performed live with them.

Hugo Largo (1984–89) was an American musical group known for their unique lineup of two bass guitars, a violin and singer/performance artist Mimi Goese. They released two albums in the late 1980s on Brian Eno's Opal Records label.

Sommer had a small speaking role in Tougher Than Leather, a 1988 feature film starring Run-D.M.C., Beastie Boys and other acts from the mid-1980s New York City hip hop movement.

He was a member of the New Orleans–based Hi-Fi Sky, who released Music for Synchronized Swimming in Space in 2005.

Sommer began working with New York City–based rock band the Indecent in 2008, in collaboration with Stuart Chatwood (formerly of the Tea Party), and produced their self-released debut album, Her Screwed Up Head (2010). In the late summer of 2010, along with Julian Raymond, he produced post-album demos for the Indecent which led to the group being signed to Warner Bros. Records.

Since 2010, Sommer has been working on his own project, titled Uncommon Folk, focusing on electric slowcore interpretations of traditional American folk songs, and featuring guest vocals by Glen Campbell, Mavis Staples, Blind Boys of Alabama, Jakob Dylan and Robin Zander.

== Journalism career ==
Sommer joined the staff of Trouser Press at the age of 16 in 1978.

Sommer wrote for the Village Voice between 1980 and 1984 and worked closely with music editor Robert Christgau; according to journalist Michael Azerrad, in his book Our Band Could Be Your Life, Sommer was the inspiration for the lyrics of the Sonic Youth song "Kill Yr Idols", in which Moore questioned his friend Sommer's respect for Christgau.

In 1989, Sommer hosted MTV's Post-Modern MTV, a five-nights-per-week late-night show devoted to alternative music. He was also a senior producer and news correspondent for MTV News. From 1990 to 1992, Sommer ran VH1's music news department, and was the exclusive host for their on-air news programming.

== A&R career ==
Sommer began working for the A&R department of Atlantic Records shortly after he left VH1. His first signing for the label was the Gits, but their lead singer Mia Zapata was murdered four days after the deal to sign the band was completed.

Later in 1993, Sommer discovered Hootie & the Blowfish and signed them to the label that August.

Sommer also worked with 7 Year Bitch, Michael Crawford, Duncan Sheik and Scott Weiland. He was also involved in the early careers of both the Beastie Boys and Kara's Flowers, producing three tracks for the latter in the summer of 2000, shortly before the group changed their name to Maroon 5. These tracks remain unreleased.

== Discography ==
Hugo Largo

- Drum (1988)
- Mettle (1989)

As producer:

- Hetch Hetchy – Swollen (1990)
- Drunken Boat – See Ruby Falls (1990)
- Cowboy Mouth – Hurricane Party (2000, unreleased)
- Kara's Flowers – MCA demos (2000, unreleased)
- Todd Kearns – MCA demos (2000, unreleased)
- Paul Sanchez – Hurricane Party (2001)
- Alexandra Scott – Spyglass (2003)
- Alexandra Scott – Spring (2005)
- The Indecent – Her Screwed Up Head (2010)
