= Vic Chesnutt =

American singer-songwriter (1964–2009)

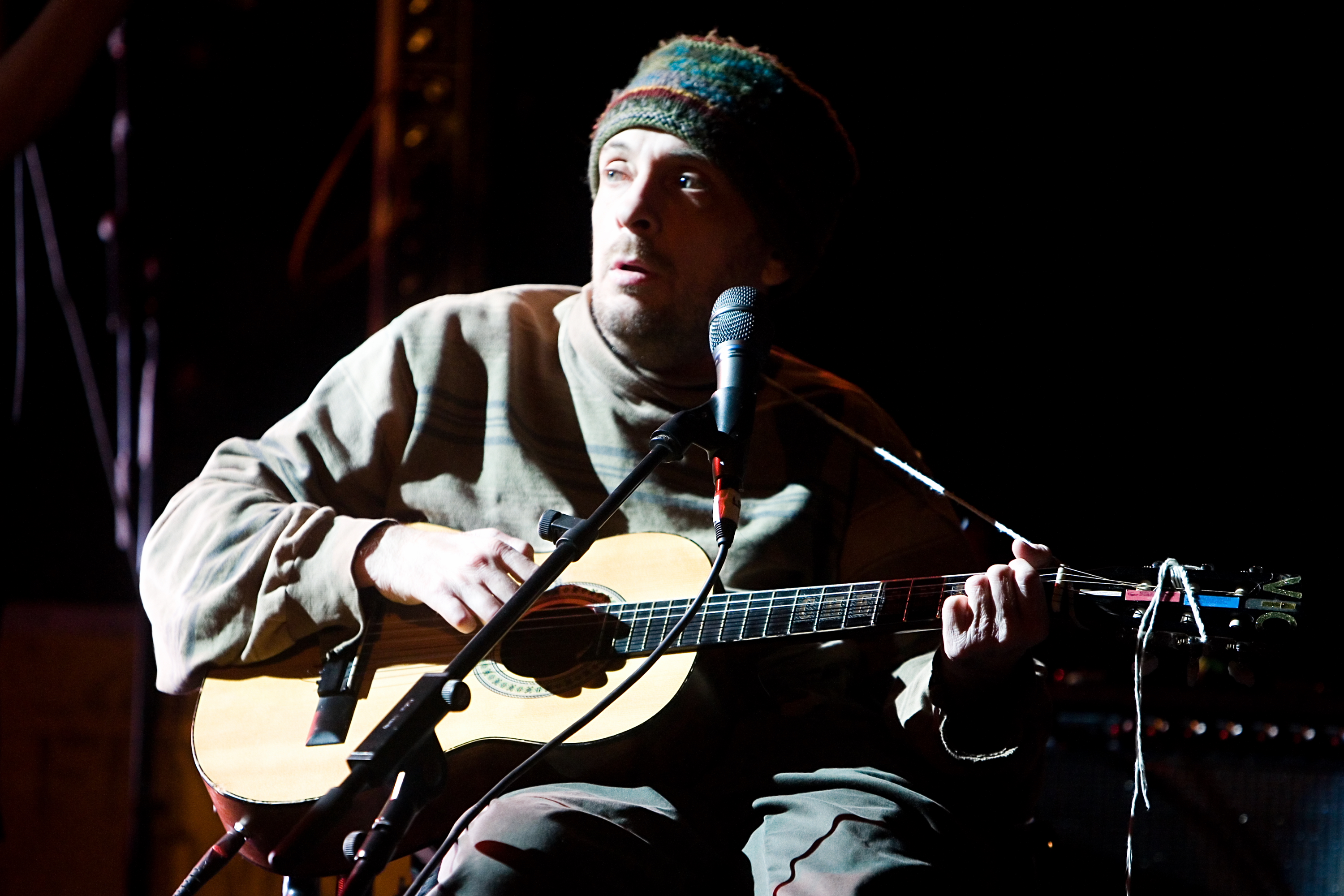
- Vic Chesnutt performing in 2008

Background information
- Born: James Victor Chesnutt; November 12, 1964; Jacksonville, Florida, U.S.
- Origin: Athens, Georgia, U.S. Zebulon, Georgia, U.S.
- Died: December 25, 2009 (aged 45) Athens, Georgia, U.S.
- Genres: Folk rock; indie folk; roots rock; alternative country
- Occupations: Singer-songwriter; musician
- Instruments: Vocals; guitar
- Years active: 1985–2009
- Labels: Constellation Records; Texas Hotel; Capitol; PolyGram; Backburner; New West; Orange Twin; Vapor
- Formerly of: brute.; Cowboy Junkies; Elf Power; Lambchop; Thee Silver Mt. Zion; Sparklehorse; Danger Mouse; The Undertow Orchestra; Widespread Panic; The La-Di-Da's; The Amorphous Strums
- Website: vicchesnutt.com (no longer active)

James Victor Chesnutt (November 12, 1964 – December 25, 2009) was an American singer-songwriter from Athens, Georgia. His first album, Little, was released in 1990. His commercial breakthrough came in 1996 with the release of Sweet Relief II: Gravity of the Situation, a charity record of alternative artists covering his songs.

Chesnutt released 17 albums during his career, including two produced by Michael Stipe, and a 1996 release on Capitol Records, About to Choke. His musical style has been described by Bryan Carroll of AllMusic as a "skewed, refracted version of Americana that is haunting, funny, poignant, and occasionally mystical, usually all at once".

Injuries from a 1983 car crash left him partially paralyzed; he used a wheelchair and had limited use of his hands.

== Early life ==
An adoptee, Chesnutt was raised in Zebulon, Georgia. He first started writing songs at the age of five. When he was 13, Chesnutt declared that he was an atheist, a position that he maintained for the rest of his life.

At 18, while drinking and driving, a car crash left him partially paralyzed. In a December 1, 2009, interview with Terry Gross on her NPR show Fresh Air, Chesnutt said he was "a quadriplegic from [his] neck down", and although he had feeling and some movement in his body, he could not walk "functionally". He realized shortly after the car crash that he could still play guitar, however he could only play simple chords. After his recovery, he left Zebulon and moved to Nashville, Tennessee; the poetry he read there (by Stevie Smith, Walt Whitman, Wallace Stevens, W. H. Auden, Stephen Crane and Emily Dickinson) served to inspire and influence him.

== Early career and films ==
Around 1985, Chesnutt moved to Athens and joined the band La-Di-Das with future member of the Dashboard Saviors Todd McBride. After leaving that group, he began performing solo on a regular basis at the 40 Watt Club; it was there that he was spotted by Michael Stipe of R.E.M. Stipe went on to produce Chesnutt's first two albums, Little (1990) and West of Rome (1991).

In 1993, Chesnutt was the subject of filmmaker Peter Sillen's independently produced documentary, Speed Racer: Welcome to the World of Vic Chesnutt, which was shown on PBS. Chesnutt also had a small role as "Terence" in the 1996 Billy Bob Thornton movie Sling Blade, which he later described self-mockingly as a poor performance.

In 1996, Chesnutt was exposed to a wider audience with the release of the charity record Sweet Relief II: Gravity of the Situation, the proceeds from which went to the Sweet Relief Fund. The album consisted of Chesnutt covers by famous musicians including R.E.M., Indigo Girls, Madonna with her brother-in-law Joe Henry, Garbage, The Smashing Pumpkins (with Red Red Meat), Cracker, Soul Asylum, and Live.

For the 2007 edition of the Vienna International Film Festival (Viennale), New York filmmaker Jem Cohen was commissioned to close the festival, which he did with his program titled, Evening's Civil Twilight in Empires of Tin. An impressionistic narrative was constructed through live readings from the texts of Joseph Roth and a live musical score performed by Vic Chesnutt, members from Thee Silver Mt. Zion Memorial Orchestra, Guy Piciotto (Fugazi), and The Quavers. The music includes improvisations, interpretations of Johann Strauss I's "Radetzky March", and renditions of a number of Vic Chesnutt songs. The result was a string of film vignettes bound by the poetry of Roth's writing and by the sounds and songs of the live musicians. A DVD of the program was released in 2009.

== Collaborations ==
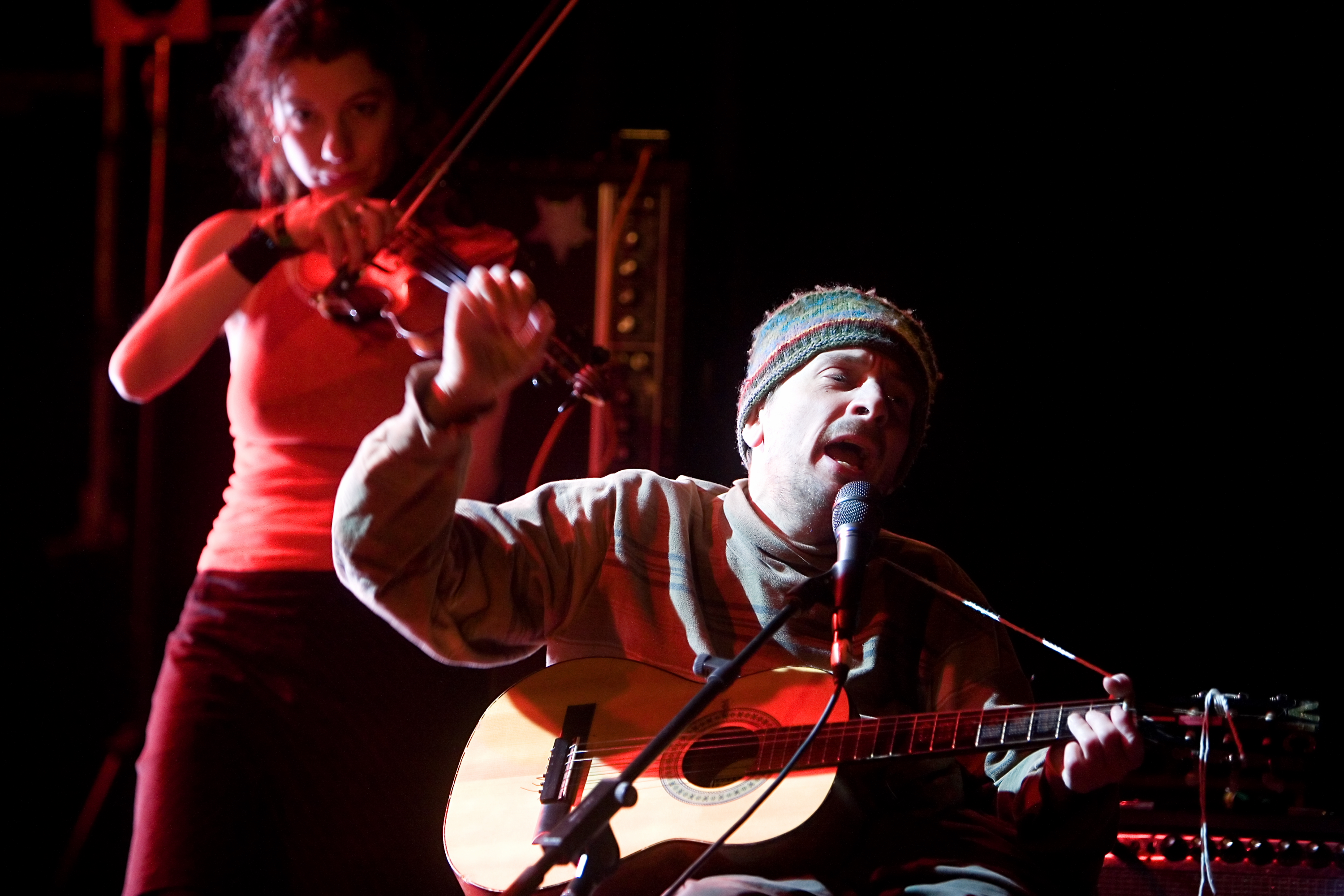
Chesnutt performing live with Jessica Moss from A Silver Mount Zion in 2008

Chesnutt recorded with many other groups and artists. He collaborated with Bob Mould on a version of Gram Parsons' song "Hickory Wind", which appeared on the 1993 compilation Conmemorativo: A Tribute to Gram Parsons.

He made two albums with fellow Athens, Georgia, group Widespread Panic, under the name brute. Chesnutt wrote "Aunt Avis" and co-wrote "Blight" and "Protein-Drink/Sewing-Machine", which are often performed live by Widespread Panic. "Aunt Avis" appeared on WSP's album Bombs & Butterflies, on which Chesnutt made a guest appearance. The 1997 video for "Aunt Avis" was directed by Billy Bob Thornton and featured Chesnutt.

After getting to know engineer Scott Stuckey during the recording of West of Rome, Stuckey and Chesnutt became close friends and would go on to collaborate on various projects including producing two more albums together, co-writing "Weed to the Rescue" for NORML's Hempilation benefit album, and working on numerous videos, including "Ladle". At the time of his death, Chesnutt and Stuckey were working on a documentary about Chesnutt's music. The film, tentatively titled Degenerate, was scheduled to be released in 2012.

Chesnutt's 1998 album The Salesman and Bernadette was recorded with alt-country group Lambchop as the backing band. The album Merriment was a collaborative effort between Chesnutt and Kelly and Nikki Keneipp, with Chesnutt writing and singing the songs, and the Keneipps playing the music.

Chesnutt was featured singing on the title track of Walking with the Beggar Boys, the 2004 album by Athens-based Elephant 6 collective recording artists Elf Power.

The 2005 album Ghetto Bells featured famed guitarist Bill Frisell, whom Chesnutt met in 2004 at the Century of Song concert series at the German festival Ruhrtriennale. Ghetto Bells also featured lyricist and composer Van Dyke Parks on accordion and keyboards. Chesnutt's wife, Tina, would frequently play bass on his albums, including Ghetto Bells. His niece and fellow songwriter, Liz Durrett, also appeared on the album.

In the winter of 2006, he recorded North Star Deserter at the Hotel2Tango in Montreal, Quebec. It was released on September 11, 2007, by Constellation Records. The record included contributions from Constellation artists Thee Silver Mt. Zion Memorial Orchestra & Tra-La-La Band, as well as Fugazi's Guy Picciotto and Bruce Cawdron of Godspeed You! Black Emperor. The album was produced by documentary filmmaker Jem Cohen.

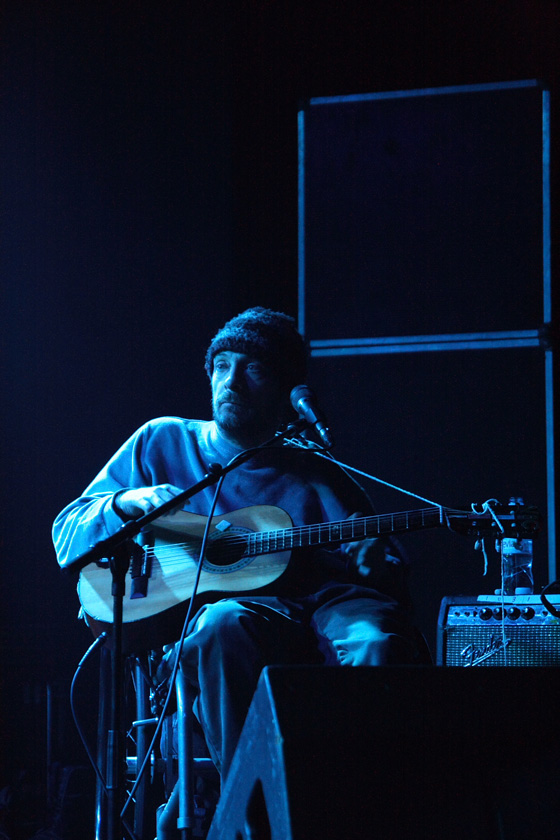
Chesnutt onstage in 2008

In 2008, Elf Power collaborated with Chesnutt on the album Dark Developments, released under the name Vic Chesnutt, Elf Power, and the Amorphous Strums. "The Amorphous Strums" refers to Curtiss Pernice and Sam Mixon, who also played on the album.

In 2009, Chesnutt again worked with many of the contributors to North Star Deserter on his new album At the Cut, released in September. As with North Star Deserter, the album was recorded in Montreal and released on Constellation Records. Later in 2009, Chesnutt recorded the album Skitter on Take-off with Jonathan Richman, which was inspired by the two albums recorded in Montreal and was released on Vapor.

In 2009, he recorded vocals for the track "Grim Augury", released on the 2010 album Dark Night of the Soul by Danger Mouse and Sparklehorse. Mark Linkous had previously attempted to collaborate with Chesnutt on the Sparklehorse album Good Morning Spider; however, Chesnutt was unable to feature in person on the album. Instead, a recorded voice message he left Linkous apologising for his inability to show was used on the song "Sunshine".

== Label history ==
Chesnutt's first four albums were released on the independent Texas Hotel label. He then recorded About to Choke (1996) for Capitol Records. The Salesman and Bernadette (1998) was on PolyGram; Merriment (2000) was on the Backburner Records label; spinART was the label for the self-performed and recorded Left to His Own Devices (2001). Chesnutt then found a home at the New West Records label, which released two of his albums. In 2004, New West also re-released the early Texas Hotel recordings, including expanded liner notes and extra tracks. In 2010 About to Choke was re-released on 180-gram vinyl on the Four Men with Beards label and distributed by City Hall Records.

== Other work ==
Chesnutt provided a powerful performance of the 1972 Bobby Russell-penned classic song, "The Night the Lights Went Out in Georgia" on Pravda Records' 1994 "Star Power" CD featuring various artists.

Chesnutt sang another, much older, classic song, "Home on the Range", based on the poem, "The Western Home", written in 1872 by Dr. Brewster M. Higley, on another CD featuring various artists entitled, "Rudy's Rockin' Kiddie Caravan", produced by Turner Network Television. Proceeds from the sale of the CD went to support the National Center for Family Literacy.

Chesnutt was also a supporter of medical marijuana, which he said helped with his medical problems. He contributed the track, "Weed to the Rescue", to the 1998 Hempilation II charity album, with proceeds going to NORML, an American organization dedicated to marijuana legalization.

Chesnutt wrote and provided vocals on the song, "Aunt Avis" on Widespread Panic's 1997 album, Bombs & Butterflies (a solo demo of Chesnutt performing the song was included as a bonus track on the 2004 re-release of his 1993 album, Drunk).

Chesnutt frequently performed Daniel Johnston's song, "Like a Monkey in a Zoo", during live performances. Chesnutt recorded a version of the song that was released on the 2004 compilation CD, The Late Great Daniel Johnston: Discovered Covered.

He also appeared as a guest musician on Cowboy Junkies' 2007 album and accompanying DVD Trinity Revisited, a 20th anniversary remake of the Junkies' classic album The Trinity Session. In 2011 Cowboy Junkies released Demons, an album of eleven Chesnutt covers.

Chesnutt recorded a solo acoustic version of the song, "Little Man", for the CD Ciao My Shining Star: The Songs of Mark Mulcahy, which was released under the Shout! Factory label in 2009.

== Death ==
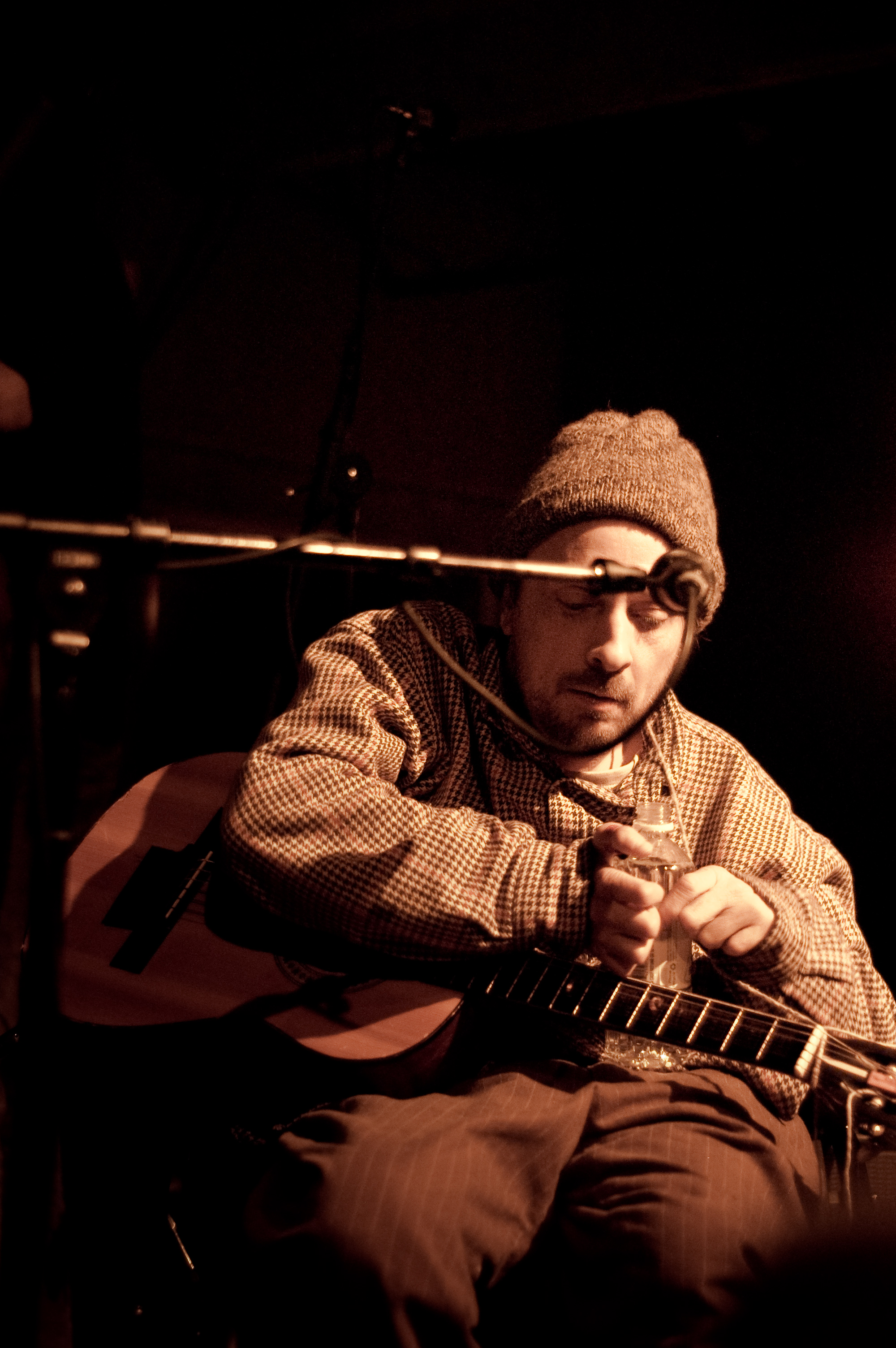
Chesnutt on stage, weeks before his death

Chesnutt died on Christmas Day 2009 from an overdose of muscle relaxants that had left him in a coma in an Athens hospital. He was 45 years old. In his final interview, which aired on National Public Radio 24 days before his death, Chesnutt said that he had "attempted suicide three or four times. It didn't take."

According to him in the same interview, being "uninsurable" due to his quadriplegia, he was $50,000 in debt for his medical bills, and had been putting off a surgery for a year ("And, I mean, I could die only because I cannot afford to go in there again. I don't want to die, especially just because of I don't have enough money to go in the hospital.").

== Impact ==
The Canadian alt-country band Cowboy Junkies recorded an album called Demons after his death, released on January 18, 2011. A tribute to Chesnutt, it features his songs. Conor Oberst of Bright Eyes described Chesnutt as "one of the greatest ever," and released a cover of Chesnutt's song "Flirted with You All My Life" in 2021.

Kristin Hersh wrote a book titled Don't Suck, Don't Die: Giving Up Vic Chesnutt, which was published by University of Texas Press and released on October 1, 2015.

== Discography ==
- 1990 Little
- 1991 West of Rome
- 1993 Drunk
- 1995 Is the Actor Happy? (with liner notes by Forrest Gander)
- 1996 About to Choke
- 1998 The Salesman and Bernadette
- 2000 Merriment
- 2001 Left to His Own Devices
- 2003 Silver Lake
- 2005 Ghetto Bells
- 2005 Extra Credit EP
- 2007 North Star Deserter
- 2008 Dark Developments (with Elf Power and The Amorphous Strums)
- 2009 Mitte Ende August OST
- 2009 At the Cut
- 2009 Skitter on Take-Off

With brute.

- 1995 Nine High a Pallet
- 2002 Co-Balt

== See also ==
- The Undertow Orchestra
