= North Star Deserter =

Studio album by Vic Chesnutt
- Released: August 27, 2007
- Genre: Alt-country
- Length: 56:58
- Label: Constellation
- Producer: Jem Cohen with Efrim Menuck, Guy Picciotto and Thierry Amar

Vic Chesnutt chronology
Ghetto Bells (2005)	North Star Deserter (2007)	Dark Developments (2008)

North Star Deserter is a 2007 album by Vic Chesnutt. The backing musicians on the album are Guy Picciotto (guitarist and vocalist for the groups Rites of Spring and Fugazi) and Canadian Post-rock band, A Silver Mt. Zion. It was released on Constellation Records on August 27, 2007 (Europe), September 11, 2007 (rest of world)

== Reception ==
Professional ratings
Review scores
Source	Rating
Pitchfork Media	(7.6/10)

Metacritic gave North Star Deserter a score of 77 (generally favorable reviews). The music review online magazine Pitchfork Media gave North Star Deserter a 7.6.

== Track listing ==
All songs written by Vic Chesnutt, except for the melody for "Glossolalia" composed by Jeff Mangum and "Fodder On Her Wings" by Nina Simone.

1. "Warm" – 3:00
2. "Glossolalia" – 3:32
3. "Everything I Say" – 6:53
4. "Wallace Stevens" – 2:17
5. "You Are Never Alone" – 5:42
6. "Fodder On Her Wings" – 3:12
7. "Splendid" – 8:29
8. "Rustic City Fathers" – 4:23
9. "Over" – 4:00
10. "Debriefing" – 8:27
11. "Marathon" – 5:34
12. "Rattle" – 1:29
