= Hugo Largo =

American musical group

- Origin: New York City
- Genres: Art rock, dream pop, ambient, avant-rock
- Years active: 1984–1991
- Labels: Relativity Records, Opal Records, Land Records, All Saints Records
- Members: Mimi Goese; Tim Sommer; Greg Letson; Adam Peacock; Hahn Rowe; Bill Stair

Hugo Largo was an American musical group formed in 1984, known for their unique lineup: two bass guitars, a violin and singer/performance artist Mimi Goese. Their sound has been characterized as art rock, dream pop, ambient and avant-rock.

== History ==
Hugo Largo formed in 1984, initially as a trio featuring vocalist Goese and bassists Tim Sommer and Greg Letson (who Sommer had met while they played together with Glenn Branca). In January 1985, Letson left, and was replaced by Adam Peacock. Shortly thereafter, they were joined on violin by Hahn Rowe, who had been engineering their live sound.

In February 1987, they released the EP Drum on Relativity Records. It was produced by Michael Stipe, who also sang backing vocals on two tracks. The EP was reissued in 1988 as a full album with additional material on Brian Eno's label, Opal Records. Their second album, Mettle, was released in 1989, first on Opal, then on All Saints Records (and on Land Records in the United Kingdom). This lineup of the band performed their final shows in July 1989.

In late 1990, Goese, Peacock and Rowe decided to reform the band without founding member Sommer (who had become an MTV veejay). They recruited bassist Bill Stair (ex-Art Objects) via an ad in The Village Voice. This new lineup of Hugo Largo spent several months rehearsing and composing new material before making their debut at a sold-out gig at the Knitting Factory in New York City on April 12, 1991. Stipe and Mike Mills of R.E.M. were in attendance as fans of the band, and they were in New York for a taping of Saturday Night Live. The reformed lineup played several more shows in New York, but a third album was never recorded although some demos and live recordings were mad). Hugo Largo played their last gig at the Brooklyn Bridge Anchorage on September 5, 1991.

In September 2024, Missing Piece Records released "Huge, Large and Electric: Hugo Largo 1984-1991," a compilation consisting of Drum and Mettle plus live and previously unreleased material.

== Later projects ==
Under the name Mimi, Goese released a solo album, Soak, in 1998, and has collaborated with artists like Moby and Ben Neill.

Sommer later played with the New Orleans–based Hi-Fi Sky, who released Music for Synchronized Swimming in Space in 2005.

== Discography ==
=== Studio albums ===
- Drum (1988, Opal Records)
- Mettle (1989, Opal Records/All Saints Records)
- Huge, Large and Electric: Hugo Largo 1984-1991 (2024, Missing Piece Records)

=== Singles and EPs ===
- Drum 12" EP (1987, Relativity Records)
- "Turtle Song" 12" single (1989, Land Records)
