= All Saints Records =

British independent record label

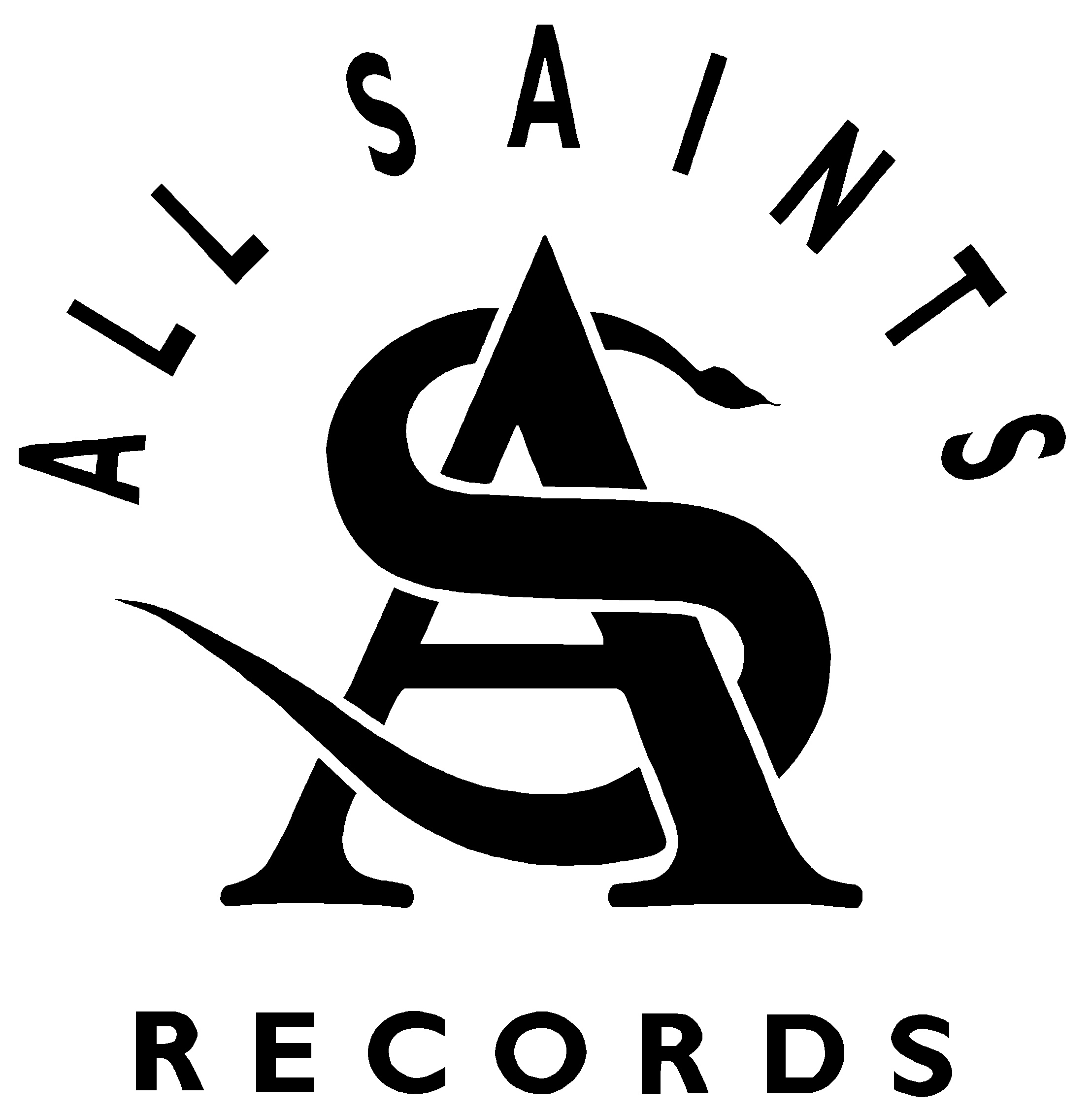
- Founded: 1991; 35 years ago
- Founder: Dominic Norman-Taylor
- Distributor: Warp Records
- Genre: Ambient
- Country of origin: United Kingdom
- Location: London, England
- Official website: allsaintsrecords.bandcamp.com

All Saints Records is a British independent record label specialising in post-rock, downtempo and ambient music.

== History ==
All Saints Records was established on 1 November 1991 by Dominic Norman-Taylor (formerly of Opal Records). Originally formed as an independent record label with distribution through Pinnacle, All Saints licensed the label through Hannibal Records until Warner Bros bought Hannibal in 2006 and closed it down. It is now closely associated with Warp Records for international marketing and distribution.

Its initial releases closely followed those of Opal Records which had ceased as a label in 1990, its first being ‘Flow Goes The Universe’ by New York artist Laraaji. Other artists followed including Biosphere, Marconi Union and Dallas Acid.

The label has released three artworks by Brian Eno, Mistaken Memories of Mediaeval Manhattan, Thursday Afternoon (on a single DVD) and 77 Million Paintings

The label is named after All Saints Road in West London despite being established on All Saints Day.

== Roster ==
- Dallas Acid
- Biosphere
- Michael Brook
- Harold Budd
- John Cale
- Channel Light Vessel
- Brian Eno
- Roger Eno
- Djivan Gasparyan
- Jon Hassell
- Daniel Lanois
- Laraaji
- Hugo Largo
- Marconi Union
- Bill Nelson
- Roedelius
- Kate St John
- Vacabou
- Jah Wobble

== See also ==
- Lists of record labels
