= Hahn Rowe =

American musician

Hahn Rowe is an American violinist, guitarist, composer, and engineer/producer, involved in a wide range of projects. He also performs using the stage name Somatic.

== Career ==
Originally a violinist and guitarist with New York City dream-poppers Hugo Largo, Rowe became a session player in the New York scene.

He has performed with Glenn Branca, Foetus, Swans, Ikue Mori, R.E.M., David Byrne, Michael Stipe, Firewater, That Petrol Emotion, and Moby. As drum and bass performer Somatic, he released the album, the new body (1998)

Rowe has engineered and produced recordings for Bill Laswell, Roy Ayers, Antony and the Johnsons, and Yoko Ono, among others. He produced several tracks on Hugo Largo former singer Mimi Goese's solo album, Soak.

Rowe has a long-standing collaboration with Brussels/Berlin-based choreographer Meg Stuart (Damaged Goods) which has resulted in the creation of eight evening-length dance/theater works. He has also created scores for choreographers Benoit Lachambre, Louise Lecavalier, and John Jasperse. Active as a composer for film and television, Rowe has created scores for films such as Clean, Shaven by Lodge Kerrigan, Spring Forward by Tom Gilroy, Married in America by Michael Apted, and Sing Your Song by Susanne Rostock.

Rowe is a three-time Bessie Award recipient; his 2001 Bessie Award was for musical composition.

== Personal life ==
Rowe is based in New York City.

== Discography ==
=== As Somatic ===
- the new body (1998, Caiprinha)
