= Texas Hotel Records =

Independent record label

Texas Hotel
- Founded: 1986; 40 years ago
- Defunct: 1996
- Status: Defunct
- Country of origin: United States
- Location: 122 Broadway, Santa Monica, California (1986-1987); No. 151, 172 Wilshire Boulevard, Santa Monica, California (1988–1995)

Texas Hotel Records was an independent record label based in Santa Monica, California, which released records by singer-songwriter Vic Chesnutt, Henry Rollins and the Rollins Band from the mid-1980s to the mid-1990s. The label, which started as a record store and later expanded into a record label, was founded by Michael Meister and Susan Farrell.

Texas Hotel was voted Hot Record Label of the year by Rolling Stone in 1989. At the time, it was planning to release a solo album by Michael Stipe, and the band Poi Dog Pondering, which was signed to the label, had attracted attention. However, Stipe's solo album was not released, and Poi Dog Pondering moved to Columbia Records, without major success. Texas Hotel Records closed in 1996. In Rolling Stone's 1000th issue, published in May 2006, Texas Hotel's subsequent lack of success was pointed out, as well as the fact that no Wikipedia article existed for the label at the time.

== Releases ==
- Henry Rollins—Hot Animal Machine (1986)
- Henrietta Collins and the Wifebeating Childhaters—Drive by Shooting (1987)
- Henry Rollins—Big Ugly Mouth (1987)
- Downy Mildew—Broomtree (1987)
- Rollins Band—Life Time (1988)
- Rollins Band—Do It (1988)
- Downy Mildew—Mincing Steps (1988)
- Kilkenny Cats—Hammer EP (1988)
- Poi Dog Pondering—Poi Dog Pondering EP (1988)
- Henry Rollins—Sweatbox (1989)
- Rollins Band—Hard Volume (1989)
- Hetch Hetchy-Swollen (1989)
- Poi Dog Pondering—Living with the Dreaming Body (1989)
- Poi Dog Pondering—Circle Around the Sun (1989)
- Baby Flamehead — Life Sandwich (1990)
- Vic Chesnutt—Little (1990)
- Poi Dog Pondering—Big Beautiful Spoon (1990)
- Poi Dog Pondering—Wishing like a Mountain and Thinking like the Sea (1990)
- Poi Dog Pondering—Everybody's Trying (1990)
- Poi Dog Pondering—Fruitless (The Breath of Life Leaves Her...) (1990)
- Vic Chesnutt—West of Rome (1991)
- Downy Mildew—An Oncoming Train (1992)
- Vic Chesnutt—Drunk (1993)
- Vic Chesnutt—Is the Actor Happy? (1995)

== See also ==
- List of record labels
