= The Mountain Goats discography =

Discography

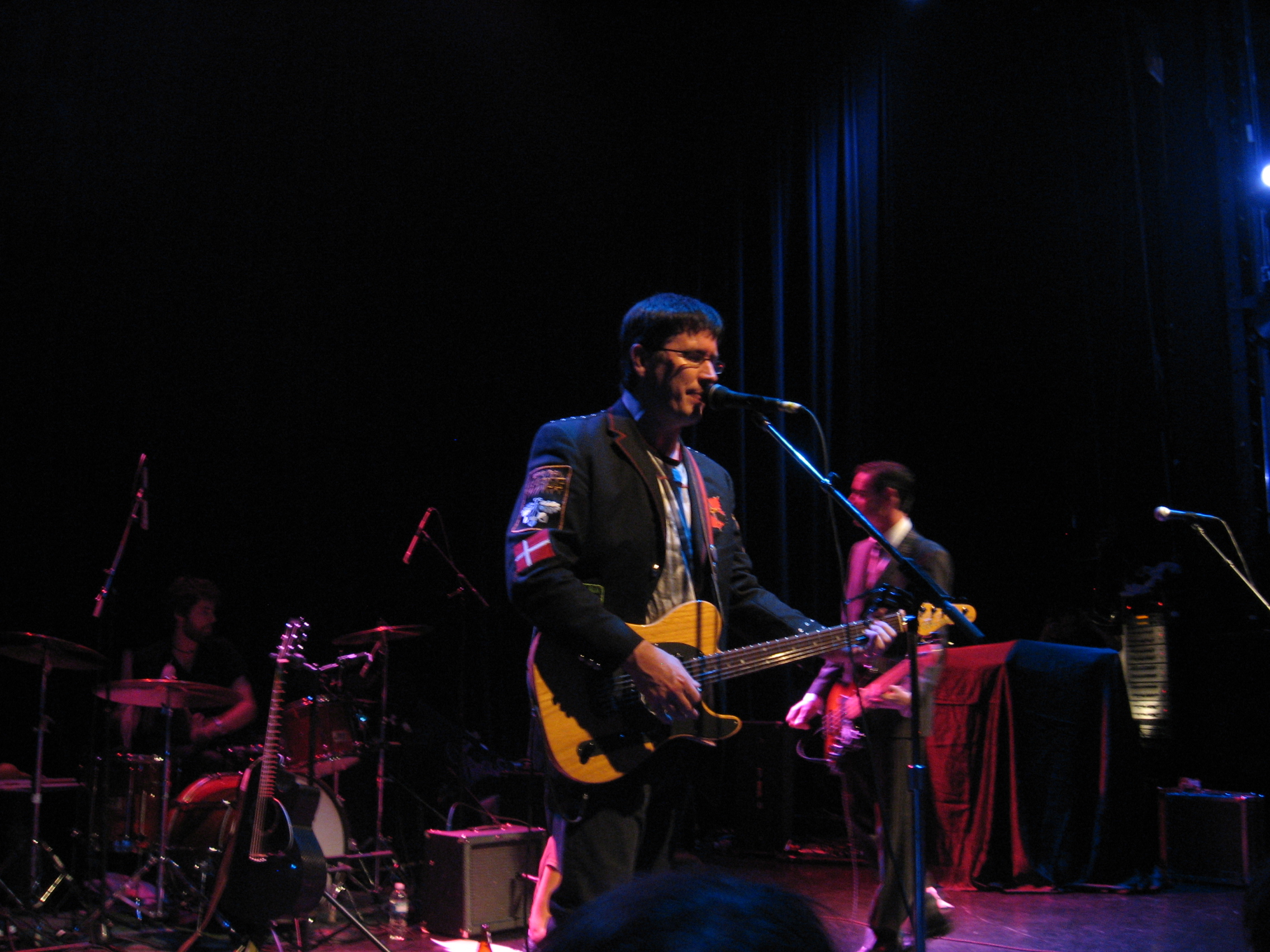
- Studio albums: 24
- Extended plays: 18
- Live albums: 4
- Compilation albums: 4
- Singles: 24
- Cassette Releases & Demo albums: 10
- Split EPs: 7

The Mountain Goats are an American, Durham, North Carolina–based band, led by American singer-songwriter John Darnielle. Darnielle began recording in 1991, and is known for his highly literate lyrics and (until 2002) his lo-fi recording style. The Mountain Goats' albums have featured a constantly changing line-up of musicians, with Darnielle the only constant; when performing live, the band commonly comprises only Darnielle backed by Peter Hughes on bass guitar and Jon Wurster playing drums. Their discography consists of 24 studio albums, four compilation albums, four live albums, six cassette-based releases, four demo albums, 18 solo extended plays, seven collaborative extended plays, and 24 singles. In addition, three unreleased albums circulate amongst collectors, and multiple unreleased or live-only tracks circulate as well.

== Albums ==
=== Studio albums ===
List of studio albums with selected chart positions and certifications
Title	Album details	Peak chart positions					
Title	Album details	US	US Indie	AUS	SCO	UK Sales	UK Indie
Zopilote Machine	Released: July 11, 1994; Label: Ajax, 3 Beads of Sweat; Format: CD, vinyl	—	—	—	—	—	—
Sweden	Released: August 7, 1995; Format: CD, vinyl	—	—	—	—	—	—
Nothing for Juice	Released: August 19, 1996; Label: Ajax; Format: CD, vinyl	—	—	—	—	—	—
Full Force Galesburg	Released: June 10, 1997; Label: Emperor Jones; Format: CD, vinyl	—	—	—	—	—	—
The Coroner's Gambit	Released: October 17, 2000; Label: Absolutely Kosher; Format: CD, vinyl	—	—	—	—	—	—
All Hail West Texas	Released: February 19, 2002; Label: Emperor Jones; Format: CD, vinyl	140	—	—	—	—	—
Tallahassee	Released: November 5, 2002; Label: 4AD; Format: CD, vinyl	—	—	—	—	—	—
We Shall All Be Healed	Released: February 3, 2004; Label: 4AD; Format: CD, vinyl	—	—	—	—	—	—
The Sunset Tree	Released: April 26, 2005; Label: 4AD; Format: CD, vinyl	—	—	—	—	—	—
Get Lonely	Released: August 22, 2006; Label: 4AD; Format: CD, vinyl	193	19	— (Note: Get Lonely did not enter the Australian ARIA Albums Chart but peaked at number 17 on the ARIA Hitseekers Chart.)	—	—	—
Heretic Pride	Released: February 19, 2008; Label: 4AD; Format: CD, vinyl	194	28	— (Note: Heretic Pride did not enter the Australian ARIA Albums Chart but peaked at number 15 on the ARIA Hitseekers Chart.)	—	—	—
The Life of the World to Come	Released: October 6, 2009; Label: 4AD; Format: CD, vinyl	110	14	—	—	—	—
All Eternals Deck	Released: March 29, 2011; Label: Merge; Format: CD, vinyl	72	15	—	—	—	—
Transcendental Youth	Released: October 2, 2012; Label: Merge; Format: CD, vinyl	86	16	—	—	—	—
Beat the Champ	Released: April 7, 2015; Label: Merge; Format: CD, vinyl	65	5	— (Note: Beat the Champ did not enter the Australian ARIA Albums Chart but peaked at number 19 on the ARIA Hitseekers Chart.)	—	—	— (Note: Beat the Champ did not enter the UK Independent Albums Chart but peaked at number 16 on the UK Independent Album Breakers Chart.)
Goths	Released: May 19, 2017; Label: Merge; Format: CD, vinyl	89	4	— (Note: Goths did not enter the Australian ARIA Albums Chart but peaked at number seven on the ARIA Hitseekers Chart.)	85	— (Note: Goths did not enter the UK Albums Chart but peaked at number 97 on the UK Album Downloads Chart.)	25
In League with Dragons	Released: April 26, 2019; Label: Merge; Format: CD, vinyl	110	6	—	65	87	38
Songs for Pierre Chuvin	Released: April 10, 2020; Label: Merge; Format: Cassette, digital, vinyl	152	19	86	13	21	5
Getting Into Knives	Released: October 23, 2020; Label: Merge; Format: CD, vinyl, cassette, digital	162	34	—	—	—	44
Dark in Here	Released: June 25, 2021; Label: Merge; Format: CD, vinyl, cassette, digital	—	40	—	—	73	31
Bleed Out	Released: August 19, 2022; Label: Merge; Format: CD, vinyl, cassette, digital	— (Note: Bleed Out did not enter the Billboard 200 but peaked at number ten on the Top Album Sales component chart.)	37	—	73	67	22
Jenny from Thebes	Released: October 27, 2023; Label: Merge; Format: CD, vinyl, cassette, digital	—	—	—	—	— (Note: Jenny from Thebes did not enter the UK Albums Chart but peaked at number 29 on the UK Album Downloads Chart.)	48
Through This Fire Across from Peter Balkan	Released: November 7, 2025; Label: Cadmean Dawn; Format: CD, vinyl, cassette, digital	—	22	—	73	67	48
Days	Released: August 7, 2026; Label: Cadmean Dawn; Format: CD, vinyl, cassette, digital	—	—	83	—	73	20
"—" denotes a recording that did not chart or was not released in that territory.

=== Live albums ===
Title	Album details	Peak chart positions		
Title	Album details	US Sales	US Folk	AUS
The Jordan Lake Sessions: 1 & 2	Released: December 4, 2020; Label: Merge; Format: digital	59	9	90
The Jordan Lake Sessions: 3 & 4	Released: November 5, 2021; Label: Merge; Format: digital	89	—	—
The Jordan Lake Sessions: 5	Released: November 18, 2022; Label: Merge; Format: digital	—	—	—
Live Archive Vol. 1: Going to Princeton 10/20/24	Released: September, 2025; Label: Cadmean Dawn; Format: vinyl	—	—	—

=== Compilation albums ===
No.	Name	Date	Label	Format
1	Protein Source of the Future...Now!	1999	Ajax	CD
2	Bitter Melon Farm	1999	Ajax	CD
3	Ghana	2002	3 Beads of Sweat	CD
4	The Hound Chronicles/Hot Garden Stomp	2012	Shrimper	CD

=== Cassette releases & Demo albums ===
Name	Date	Label	Format
Taboo VI: The Homecoming	1991	Shrimper	Cassette
The Hound Chronicles	1992	Shrimper	Cassette
Transmissions to Horace	1993	Sonic Enemy	Cassette
Hot Garden Stomp	1993	Shrimper	Cassette
Taking the Dative	1994	Car in Car	Cassette
Yam, the King of Crops	1994	Oska	Cassette
Come, Come to The Sunset Tree	2005	Self-released	LP
Heretic Pride Demos	2008	4AD	Digital download
The Life of the World in Flux	2009	4AD	CD
All Survivors Pack	2011	Merge	Cassette

== Extended plays ==
Title	EP details	Peak chart positions	
Title	EP details	US Indie	AUS
Songs for Petronius	Released: 1992; Label: Shrimper; Formats: 7"	—	—
Chile de Árbol	Released: 1993; Label: Ajax; Formats: 7"	—	—
Beautiful Rat Sunset	Released: 1994; Label: Shrimper; Formats: 10", CD, digital download	—	—
Philyra	Released: 1994; Label: Theme Park; Formats: 7"	—	—
Songs for Peter Hughes	Released: 1995; Label: Sonic Squid; Formats: 7"	—	—
Songs About Fire	Released: 1995; Label: Cassiel; Formats: 7"	—	—
Nine Black Poppies	Released: 1995; Label: Emperor Jones; Formats: CD, digital download	—	—
New Asian Cinema	Released: 1998; Label: Yoyo; Formats: 12", digital download	—	—
Isopanisad Radio Hour	Released: 2000; Label: Yoyo; Formats: 12", digital download	—	—
On Juhu Beach	Released: 2001; Label: Nursecall; Formats: MiniCD, digital download	—	—
Devil in the Shortwave	Released: 2002; Label: Yoyo; Formats: 12", digital download	—	—
Dilaudid	Released: March 21, 2005; Label: 4AD; Formats: Digital download	—	—
Babylon Springs EP	Released: April 3, 2006; Label: 4AD; Formats: CD, digital download	—	86
Satanic Messiah	Released: 2008; Label: Self-released; Formats: 2x7", digital download	—	—
Selected Goths in Ambient	Released: May 19, 2017; Label: Merge; Formats: 12" (exclusive with pre-order for Goths)	—	—
Marsh Witch Visions	Released: October 6, 2017; Label: Merge; Formats: Digital download	—	—
Hex of Infinite Binding	Released: September 7, 2018; Label: Merge; Formats: Digital download	44	—
Aquarium Drunkard's Lagniappe Session	Released: November 30, 2018; Label: Merge; Formats: Digital download	—	—

=== Split EPs ===
Title	EP details
Why You All So Thief? (with Simon Joyner)	Released: 1994; Label: Sing, Eunuchs!; Formats: 7"
Orange Raja, Blood Royal (with Alastair Galbraith)	Released: 1995; Label: Walt; Formats: 7"
Tropical Depression EP (with Furniture Huschle)	Released: 1996; Label: Little Mafia; Formats: 7"
Bedside Recordings Vol. 1.2 (with John Vanderslice)	Released: 2003; Label: Bedside; Formats: 7"
Black Pear Tree (with Kaki King)	Released: 2008; Label: Cadmean Dawn; Formats: 12"
Moon Colony Bloodbath (with John Vanderslice)	Released: 2009; Label: Cadmean Dawn; Formats: 12"
Takin' It Easy / Good Morning / Revolution Blues / Shot In The Dark (with Mikal Cronin, Superchunk, and Mount Moriah)	Released: February 2014; Label: Merge; Formats: 2x7"

== Singles ==
Title	Year	Album
"Jam Eater Blues"	2002	Non-album single
"See America Right"	2002	Tallahassee
"Palmcorder Yajna"	2003	We Shall All Be Healed
"Letter from Belgium"	2004	We Shall All Be Healed
"Steal Smoked Fish" / "In The Shadow Of The Western Hills"	2012	Transcendental Youth bonus track
"Who You Are" (Note: Released exclusively through Google Play.)	2014	Non-album single
"Blood Capsules" / "Dub Capsules"	2015	Beat the Champ bonus track
"Rain in Soho"	2017	Goths
"Andrew Eldritch Is Moving Back To Leeds"	2017	Goths
"From the Lake Trials"	2017	Non-album singles
"Song for Sasha Banks"	2018	Non-album singles
Welcome to Passaic ("Passaic 1975" / "Get High and Listen to The Cure")	2019	In League with Dragons
"Younger"	2019	In League with Dragons
"Sentries In The Ambush" / "Divided Sky Lane"	2019	In League with Dragons bonus track
"Get Famous"	2020	Getting Into Knives
"As Many Candles as Possible"	2020	Getting Into Knives
"Picture of My Dress"	2020	Getting Into Knives
"Mobile"	2021	Dark in Here
"The Slow Parts On Death Metal Albums"	2021	Dark in Here
"Dark in Here"	2021	Dark in Here
"Training Montage"	2022	Bleed Out
"Wage Wars Get Rich Die Handsome"	2022	Bleed Out
"Mark on You"	2022	Bleed Out
"Clean Slate"	2023	Jenny from Thebes
"Fresh Tattoo"	2023	Jenny from Thebes
"Murder at the 18th St. Garage"	2023	Jenny from Thebes
"Armies of the Lord"	2025	Through This Fire Across from Peter Balkan
"Cold at Night"	2025	Through This Fire Across from Peter Balkan
"Rocks in My Pockets"	2025	Through This Fire Across from Peter Balkan
"Put the Message in the Box" / "Migrations" (with Mary Chapin Carpenter)	2026	Non-album single
"Charlie Sheen Reaches Out to the Feds"	2026	Days
"Shallow Grave"	2026	Days
"Candlebox"	2026	Days

=== Certified songs ===
Year	Title	Certifications	Album
2002	"No Children"	RIAA: Gold	Tallahassee

== Other appearances ==
Name	Date	Label	Song contributed
Back to the Egg, Asshole	1991	Shrimper	"Wild Palm City (aka Within You, Without You)"
A Munchies Kinda Christmas	1992	Sonic Enemy	"The Pieman (live)"
Pawnshop Reverb	1992	Shrimper	"The Window Song"
Hard Core Acoustic	1993	Shrimper	"Going to Maine"
I Like Walt	1994	Walt	"Noche del Guajolote"
You and What Army?	1994	Sing Eunuchs	"Going to Bangor"
Howl...A Farewell Compilation of Unreleased Songs	1994	Glitterhouse/Zuma	"Against Agamemnon"
I Present This	1994	Union Pole	"Rain Song"
Those Pre-Phylloxera Years	1994	Box Dog Sound	"Faithless Bacchant Song"
The Basement Tapes: Live Recordings at KSPC 1989–1995	1995	KSPC	"The Anglo-Saxons"
The Long Secret	1995	Harriet	"Duke Ellington"
Corkscrewed	1995	Theme Park	"Flight 717: Going To Denmark" and "The Admonishing Song"
Cool Beans #4	1995	Cool Beans	"The Last Day of Jimi Hendrix's Life"
Fast Forward 2	1995	Brinkman	"Noctifer Birmingham"
The Wheel Method	1995	Pottery	"Song for an Old Friend"
The Wedding Record	1995	Walt	"Going To Port Washington"
Our Salvation Is in Hand	1995	Theme Park	"Hand Ball" and "Alpha Omega"
Goar #11	1995	Goar	"Creature Song" and "Pure Sound"
Cyanide Guilt Trip	1996	Cactus Gum	"Leaving Home"
Dog So Large I Cannot See Past It	1996	Dark Beloved Cloud	"Snow Song"
In Release City	1996	Slowball	"Black Molly"
Hey Dan K.	Unreleased	Ajax	"Going to Kirby Sigston"
We'll Sail Out Far... Maybe a Little Too Far...	1997	Apartment	"Please Come Home to Hamngatan"
Object Lessons: Songs About Products	1998	Inconspicuous	"Golden Boy"
Acuarela Songs	2001	Acuarela	"Saigon Shrunken Panorama"
Gold Kiss Gala: I'll Wed You	2001	Dark Beloved Cloud	"Un Reve Plus Long Que La Nuit"
Comes with a Smile 11: Hope Isn't a Word	2004	Comes with a smile	"Beat the Devil"
Down in a Mirror: A Second Tribute to Jandek	2005	Summersteps Records	"White Box" (Jandek cover)
The Believer 2005 CD	2005	The Believer	"Pet Politics" (Silver Jews cover)
Like A Version 2	2006	Australian Broadcasting Corporation	"Wild World" (The Birthday Party cover)
n/a (specially commissioned song)	2008	Weekend America	"Down to the Ark"
Score! 20 Years of Merge Records: The Covers!	2009	Merge Records	"Drug Life" (East River Pipe cover)
Stroke – Songs for Chris Knox	2009	Flying Nun	"Brave" (Chris Knox cover)
Smooth Sounds: The Future Hits of WCKR SPGT (A 20th Anniv. Shrimper Comp.)	2010	Shrimper	"Predator Eyes"
A.V. UNDERCOVER	2011	A.V. UNDERCOVER Studio	"Boxcar" (Jawbreaker cover)
Our First 100 Days	2017	Secretly Group	"Etruscans"
Almost Live From Joyful Noise	2017	Joyful Noise Recordings	"From the Lake Trials"
Tick, Tick... Boom! (film)	2021	Netflix	"Only Takes a Few (bonus track)" (Jonathan Larson cover)

== Unreleased ==
Name	Date	Label	Format
Nall's Picks	1993	Unreleased	N/A
Hail and Farewell, Gothenburg	1995	Unreleased	N/A
Jack and Faye	1996	Unreleased	7"
