= Sax Rohmer 1 =

"Sax Rohmer #1"

Single by The Mountain Goats

from the album Heretic Pride
- Released: February 18, 2008 (United Kingdom); February 19, 2008 (United States)
- Genre: Folk rock, indie rock
- Length: 3:41
- Label: 4AD
- Songwriter: John Darnielle
- Producers: Scott Solter, John Vanderslice

The Mountain Goats singles chronology
"Sax Rohmer #1" (2008)	"San Bernardino" (2008)

Music video
- "Sax Rohmer #1" on YouTube

"Sax Rohmer #1" is the first track on the Mountain Goats' Heretic Pride album released in 2008 on 4AD.

The song describes the milieu of prolific English writer Sax Rohmer whose series of novels featured master criminal Dr. Fu Manchu.

== Reception ==
Allmusic's Steve Leggett called "Sax Rohmer #1" "shuffling." Crawdaddy!'s Jessica Gentile called "Sax Rohmer #1" an "anthemic opener [that] lets us know that 'All roads lead towards the same blocked intersection.'" NPR's Afton Woodward called "Sax Rohmer #1" "one of the best songs" from Heretic Pride stating "[Darnielle] lets loose a barrage of dark and sinister imagery that could have been lifted from a Fu Manchu novel, from 'piles of broken bricks, sign posts on the path' to 'hopeless urchins' and 'spies from imperial China.' He lays this narrative over a diligent but unremarkable guitar melody, intentionally (and wisely) letting the story dominate. But then, slipping into a catchy and strangely upbeat chorus, the song becomes less about the dangers of Rohmer's dark world, and more about finding the way home in spite of them."

Paste's Jesse Jarnow noted the melodrama with lyrics as "I am coming home to you, with my own blood in my mouth ... if it’s the last thing that I do." and found the song reflective in "phrasing and word choice" of "Half Dead" from the 2006 studio album Get Lonely. Pitchfork Media's Zach Baron called "Sax Rohmer #1" (along with "Lovecraft in Brooklyn" and "In the Craters of the Moon") a "seething throwback [...] taut, propulsive, paranoid, furious." Sputnikmusic's Ryan Flatley remarked on the "fullness of the sound and words [that] spill out methodically behind a sweet-and-sour story that is almost heart-wrenching."

Stereogum said they were "totally stoked with the older-school sound." The Village Voice's Mike Powell reviewed "Sax Rohmer #1" noting both the character and composition. "The familiar grind of a character valiantly trying to make it home in a world full of reasons why he won't. Reality is so absurdly stacked against him that my inclination is to laugh, but it's hard to laugh at someone who admits his mouth is full of his own blood. Darnielle's flurry of downstrokes—he has about three different song types, the flurry-of-downstrokes model being the signature and possibly most beloved among them—is mimicked by the rattle of snare and the somersault of tom-toms. His urgency—and the song's poignancy—is encapsulated by the title's reference to Sax Rohmer, the English pulp novelist: a character blessed with an eye keen enough to catalog the grimness that surrounds him, but also dumb enough to believe he's going to escape it."
