= Bitter Melon Farm =

Compilation album by the Mountain Goats
- Released: 1999; April 23, 2002
- Recorded: 1992–1996
- Genre: Folk-rock, lo-fi, rock
- Length: 66:57
- Label: Ajax; 3 Beads of Sweat
- Producer: John Darnielle

The Mountain Goats chronology
Protein Source of the Future...Now! (1999)	Bitter Melon Farm (1999)	Ghana (1999)

Professional ratings
Review scores
Source	Rating
AllMusic	4/5 stars
Pitchfork	7.5/10

Bitter Melon Farm is the second in a three-part series of compilations by the Mountain Goats, released in 1999 by Ajax Records. It is preceded by Protein Source of the Future...Now!, and followed by Ghana.

== Track listing ==
All tracks are written by John Darnielle, except where noted.

No.	Title	Original release	Length
1.	"Noche del Guajolote"	I Like Walt	2:03
2.	"Going to Bangor"	You and What Army?	1:36
3.	"Against Agamemnon"	Howl...a Farewell Compilation of Unreleased Songs	2:10
4.	"Going to Cleveland"	Transmissions to Horace	3:07
5.	"Early Spring"	Transmissions to Horace	2:20
6.	"Historiography"	Transmissions to Horace	2:53
7.	"No, I Can't"	Transmissions to Horace	3:25
8.	"Alpha Desperation March"	Transmissions to Horace	2:51
9.	"Going to Monaco"	Transmissions to Horace	2:40
10.	"Star Dusting"	Transmissions to Horace	2:15
11.	"Teenage World"	Transmissions to Horace	2:27
12.	"Going to Santiago"	Transmissions to Horace	2:27
13.	"Sail On" (Lionel Richie)	Transmissions to Horace	2:57
14.	"Black Molly"	In Release City	2:24
15.	"Rain Song"	I Present This	1:54
16.	"The Bad Doctor"	Songs for Petronius	3:39
17.	"Alpha Double Negative: Going to Catalina"	Songs for Petronius	2:43
18.	"Pure Intentions"	Songs for Petronius	2:14
19.	"The Lady from Shanghai"	Songs for Petronius	2:10
20.	"Pure Love"	Songs for Petronius	2:19
21.	"Song for an Old Friend"	The Wheel Method	2:25
22.	"Snow Song"	Dog So Large I Cannot See Past It	2:04
23.	"Faithless Bacchant Song"	Those Pre-Phylloxera Years	1:59
24.	"Short Song About the 10 Freeway"	Songs for Peter Hughes	1:47
25.	"No, I Can't"	Songs for Peter Hughes	3:36
26.	"Song for Dana Plato"	Songs for Peter Hughes	1:54
27.	"The Sign" (Jonas Berggren)	Songs for Peter Hughes	2:28

== Personnel ==
- John Darnielle – vocals, guitar
- Rachel Ware – vocals, bass
