= Lovecraft in Brooklyn =

Single by The Mountain Goats

from the album Heretic Pride
- Released: February 18, 2008 (United Kingdom); February 19, 2008 (United States)
- Genre: Folk rock, indie rock
- Length: 3:49
- Label: 4AD
- Songwriter: John Darnielle
- Producers: Scott Solter, John Vanderslice

The Mountain Goats singles chronology
"In the Craters on the Moon" (2008)	"Lovecraft in Brooklyn" (2008)	"Tianchi Lake" (2008)

Music video
- "Lovecraft in Brooklyn" on YouTube

"Lovecraft in Brooklyn" is the eighth track on the Mountain Goats' Heretic Pride album released in 2008 on 4AD.

The title refers to the fears of horror fiction writer H. P. Lovecraft during his residence in Red Hook, Brooklyn.

== Lyrics ==
Comic book artist Jeffrey Lewis contributed pre-release promotional material for the album accompanied with John Darnielle's notes.

In an interview with io9's Charlie Jane Anders concerning the song's imagery, songwriter John Darnielle stated "Lovecraft in Brooklyn" "is not really about Lovecraft — it's sung by a guy who's identifying with Lovecraft at his most xenophobic and terrified. Why does that appeal? I think I'm just attracted to hermits in general — to people who don't feel like they're part of the world, who have a hard time feeling like they're really present in the same space as everybody else."

== Reception ==
Allmusic's Steve Leggett called "Lovecraft in Brooklyn" "odd (and) lysergic" and noted that it "feels like the screenplay for a campy B movie monster flick given musical form, only, of course, it might be something else entirely." Crawdaddy!'s Jessica Gentile called "Lovecraft in Brooklyn" "muscular, electric, and imbued with paranoia" and "by far, the heaviest song the band’s ever recorded." Pitchfork Media's Zach Baron called "Lovecraft in Brooklyn" (alongside songs "Sax Rohmer #1" and "In the Craters of the Moon") a "seething throwback [...] taut, propulsive, paranoid, furious."

Slant Magazine's Dave Hughes found it to be "surprisingly assertive" and "awesomely angular." Sputnikmusic's Ryan Flatley noted its "staccato, yet catchy bass-line and Kayo Dot-esque violins." Tiny Mix Tapes's Judy Berman praised Darnielle's "talent for subtly coloring his lyrics with the voice of the frightened narrator", and in particular emphasized the line "woke up afraid of my own shadow / Like, genuinely afraid." Cokemachineglow, however, found this same line to be "utterly, ridiculously superfluous" and "a bad line" that "rings false".

== Live versions ==
For 2013's SF Sketchfest, John Darnielle performed "Lovecraft in Brooklyn" along with "The Best Ever Death Metal Band" for the podcast Judge John Hodgman.

== Alternate versions ==
American hip hop music artist Aesop Rock remixed the song including additional lyrics. Musician John Darnielle called it a "completely great from-the-ground-up remix."

The Morning News's Erik Bryan called the collaboration "strange. Darnielle’s lyrics and vocals make it not the chillest groove, even as Aesop Rock’s mix tries to force it in that direction, which may be precisely akin to the paranoid displacement H.P. Lovecraft felt upon moving to New York."
