= Universal Harvester =

2017 novel by John Darnielle

- First edition cover
- Author: John Darnielle
- Cover artist: Rodrigo Corral and Alex Merto
- Publisher: Farrar, Straus and Giroux
- Publication date: February 7, 2017
- Publication place: United States
- Media type: Print
- ISBN: 978-0-374-28210-3

Universal Harvester is a novel by the American novelist and singer-songwriter John Darnielle. It is the second novel written by Darnielle, after Wolf in White Van. It tells the story of a video store clerk in Iowa who finds strange and disturbing clips recorded over the store's VHS tapes.

The New York Times Book Review described the novel as "effortlessly sketching modest lives in the green, empty expanses of the heartland" and noted "ultimately the novel doesn't belong in the horror aisle".

Universal Harvester was released on February 7, 2017.
