= Blood Circus =

Blood Circus may refer to:

- Blood Circus (film)
- Blood Circus (band)
