= Ox Baker =

American wrestler & actor (1934–2014)

Personal information
- Born: Douglas Baker; April 19, 1934 Sedalia, Missouri, U.S.
- Died: October 20, 2014 (aged 80) Hartford, Connecticut, U.S.
- Cause of death: Myocardial infarction

Professional wrestling career
- Ring name(s): Doug Baker; Ox Baker; The Ox; The Arkansas Ox
- Billed height: 6 ft 3 in (191 cm)
- Billed weight: 308 lb (140 kg)
- Billed from: Waterloo, Iowa
- Trained by: Buddy Austin; Pat O'Connor; Bob Geigel
- Debut: June 20, 1958
- Retired: June 21, 2008

Douglas Baker (April 19, 1934 – October 20, 2014), known professionally as Ox Baker, was an American professional wrestler and actor. He was famous for his distinctive eyebrows and finishing move, the Heart Punch, sometimes called the "Hurt Punch", after Baker's famous catchphrase "I love to hurt people!". He appeared in several films including Blood Circus and Escape from New York.

== Early life ==
Baker was an accomplished high school athlete in his adopted hometown of Waterloo, Iowa, but he quit school. Later, he began wrestling to provide financial support to his family, having married and had children at a young age.

== Professional wrestling career ==
=== Early career ===
Baker was trained by Buddy Austin, Pat O'Connor, and Bob Geigel. He then had his debut in 1964. As time went on, he was winning a majority of his matches by knockout caused by the Heart Punch; he later renamed the move the Hurt Punch when Stan Stasiak, from whom Baker adopted the move, objected. Initially debuting as a kind, horn-rimmed-glasses-wearing country simpleton, Baker later turned into a villain.

In 1967 Baker worked for the World Wide Wrestling Federation (WWWF) as The Friendly Arkansas Ox. In his first appearance there, Baker teamed with Armand Hussein in a handicap match versus Gorilla Monsoon. Later on, Baker went to fight in different promotions through North America, including Stampede Wrestling in Canada, the World Wrestling Council in Puerto Rico, and the United States–based American Wrestling Association throughout the 1970s.

=== 1970s ===
On June 13, 1971, Baker and his partner The Claw were wrestling in an AWA Midwest Tag Team Championship tag team match against Alberto Torres and "Cowboy" Bob Ellis in Verdigre, Nebraska. Torres died shortly after the match with the cause determined to be a result of heart disease. This was worked into an angle in which Baker's Heart Punch was blamed to reinforce Baker's wrestling heel persona. On August 1, 1972, Baker lost to Ray Gunkel. Following the match, Gunkel also died; his death has been variously attributed to a blood clot, which led to a heart attack or simply to heart disease. Again, the death was worked into Baker's character, and in 1974, a riot erupted in Cleveland, Ohio, when Baker continually Heart Punched his opponent Ernie Ladd after the match was finished.

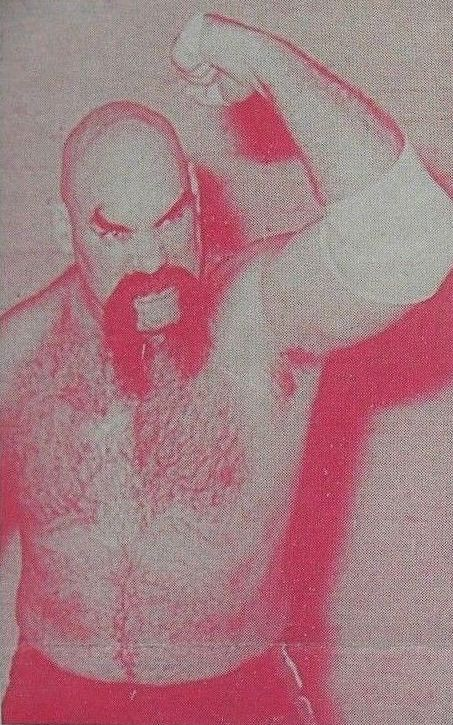
Baker in 1975

During his career he defeated "Cowboy" Bob Ellis for the World Wrestling Association's World Heavyweight Championship in Indianapolis and Carlos Colon for the WWC Universal Heavyweight Championship in Puerto Rico's World Wrestling Council. Baker beat The Sheik to win the Detroit version of the US Heavyweight title; he also won the NWA American Heavyweight Championship and the NWA Texas Heavyweight title several times. In addition, Baker was a multi-time tag team champion; he teamed with Ole Anderson and Skandor Akbar to capture tag team championships in the National Wrestling Alliance and National Wrestling Federation. Baker teamed with Chuck O'Connor to win the WWA World Tag Team Championship in 1976. He also teamed with Superstar Billy Graham to hold the NWA Florida Tag Team Championship. He is noted for a feud with Randy Savage in International Championship Wrestling, the southern promotion that Savage ran with his father Angelo Poffo and his brother Lanny Poffo. Late in his career, Baker appeared with Central States Wrestling as a face and feuded with Rip Rogers.

=== 1980s ===
In 1988, Baker returned to the AWA and remained under contract with them until later that same year when he officially retired from wrestling. The following year in 1989, he opened "Ox Baker's Wrestling School", becoming a renowned wrestling trainer. His students include The Undertaker, Bryan Clark, and Ox Baker Jr (Ronald Schell) as well as NWA New England Superstar The Dark Angel and his Kayfabe twin brother Micky Byggs of Wrestling Spotlite Radio/TV.

=== Later career ===
He returned to the WWF in 1980 and was given The Grand Wizard as his manager. Baker appeared at a TV tapings in Allentown, Pennsylvania, on March 25, beating 3 jobbers but left shortly after and never wrestled for the WWF again. He also did commentary for some IWCCW events in the early 1990s. Baker made an appearance in Ring of Honor in 2004 during their At Our Best event, confronting Dusty Rhodes before the show started and again during the main event that Rhodes was involved in. Baker also made an appearance in Combat Zone Wrestling on December 8, 2007, at Cage of Death 9 as the guest of Cult Fiction (Halfbreed Billy Gram and Toby Klein). In June 2008, Baker fought in two matches defeating Moonshine McCoy for Ultimate Championship Wrestling in Florida. In December 2013, Baker returned to the ring to be crowned the CCW Champion after being a surprise entrant in a thirteen-man battle royal in Ohio.

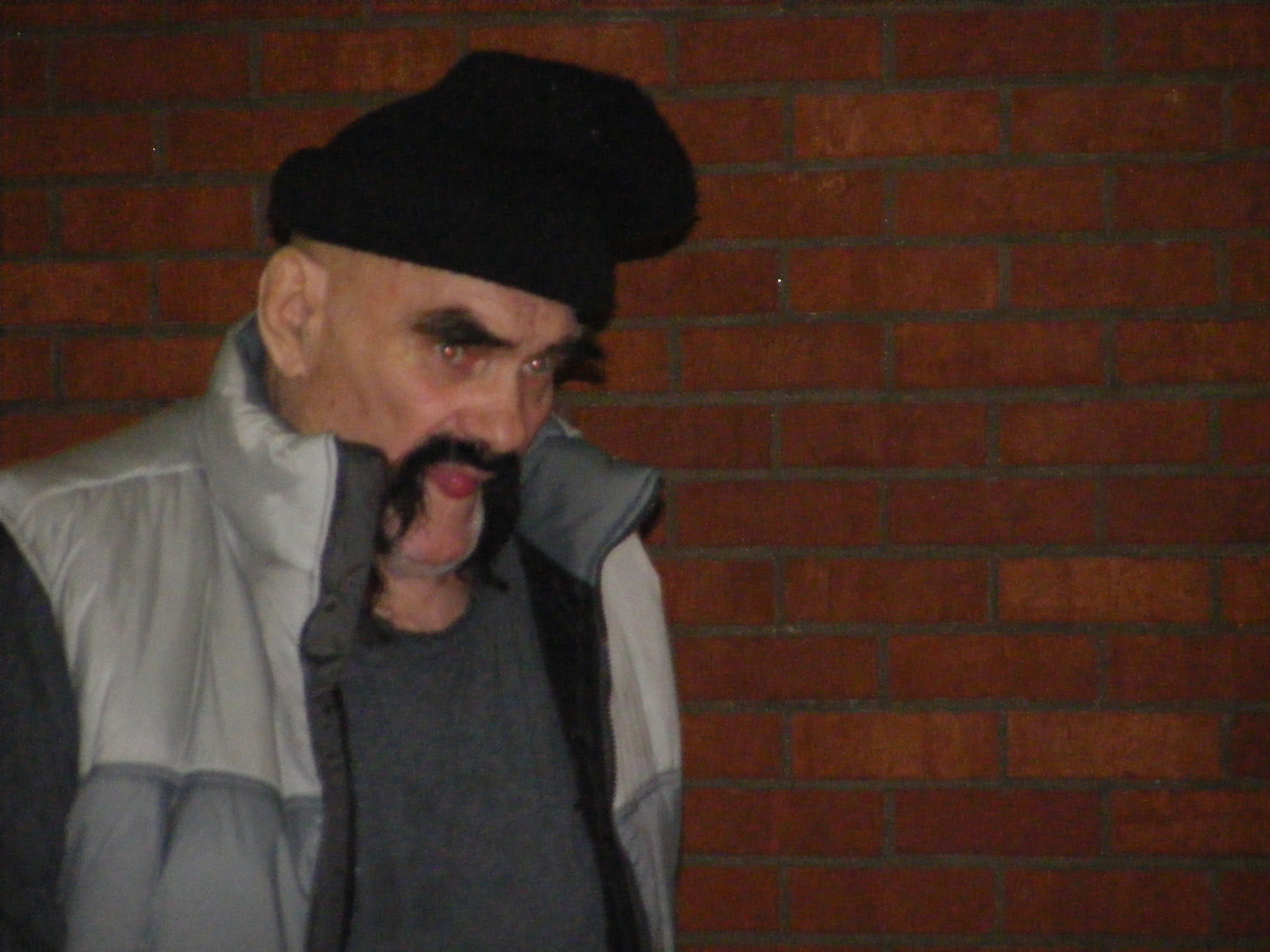
Baker in 2010

== Other media ==
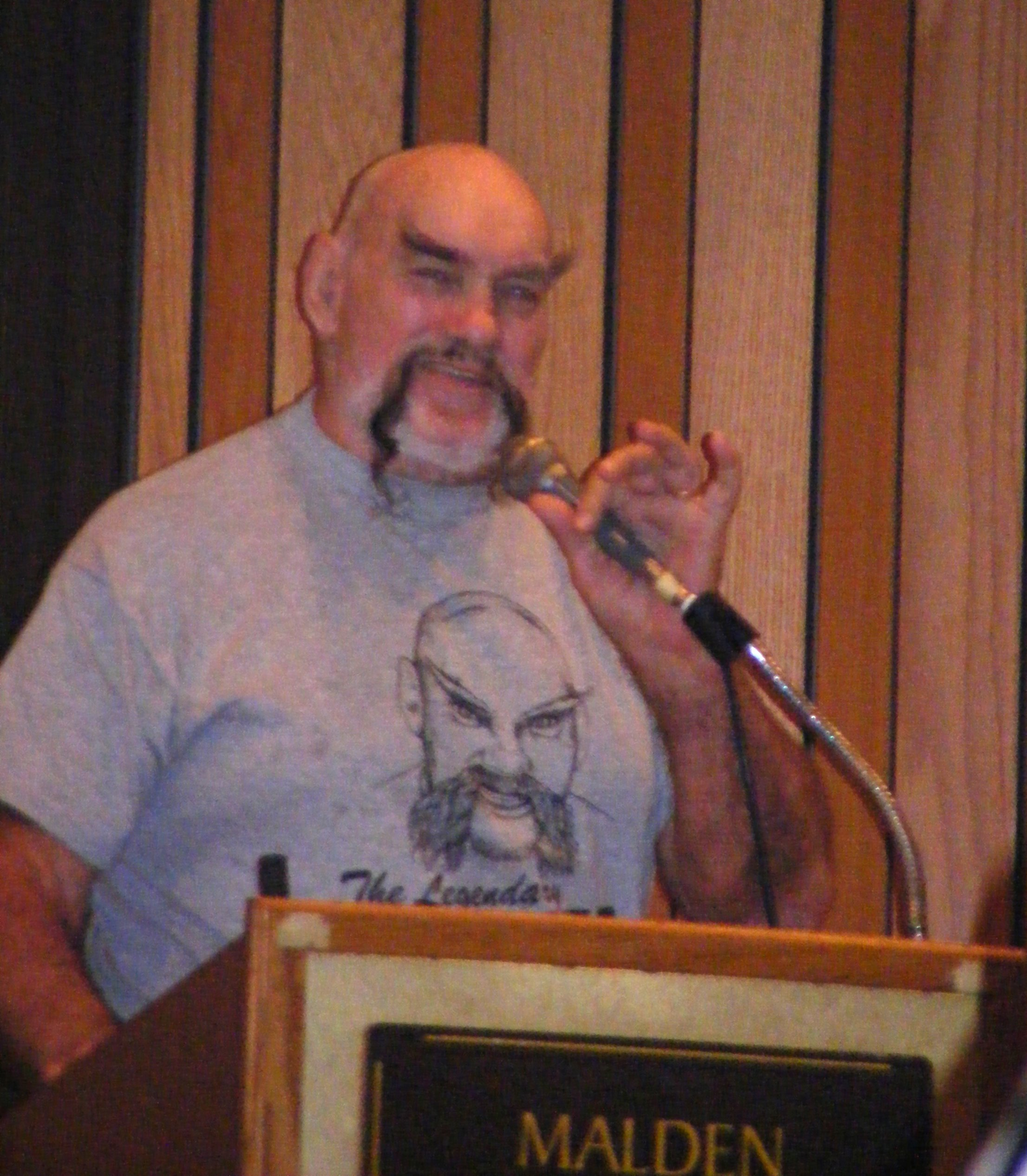
Baker speaks at the Killer Kowalski Memorial Show in Malden, Massachusetts, on October 26, 2008

During the midst of his professional wrestling career, Baker appeared in many films from time to time, most notably during the late 1970s and early 1980s. He appeared as a fighter in Jackie Chan's The Big Brawl (1980) and as Kurt Russell's gladiatorial opponent in John Carpenter's Escape from New York (1981). In addition, he was cast in the professional wrestling film named for his catch phrase, I Like to Hurt People. On January 19, 1981, Baker was a contestant on the game show The Price is Right. In 1985, Ox Baker played the Russian in the wrestling film Blood Circus, and in 2013, appeared in Chilling Visions: 5 Senses of Fear as The Butcher.

In 2005, a documentary based on the life and career of Baker was filmed, directed by Halfbreed Billy Gram, with the working title of I Love the People I Hurt: The Life and Legend of the Mighty Ox Baker. A short comedy feature titled My Smorgasboard with Ox, co-written and co-starring Baker and Gram, was also filmed during this time, with both remaining in post-production status.

In 2006, the North Carolina–based indie band the Mountain Goats released a song on their Babylon Springs EP titled "Ox Baker Triumphant", in which Baker is betrayed by the wrestling community and rises up to strike vengeance upon them. In 2011, Baker self-published his own cookbook, which included recipes and stories during his time in the wrestling business. In 2015, Veteran Pro Wrestling out of Groton, Connecticut held the first annual Ox Baker Memorial Cup. The winner for 2015 was Bad News Walter Swan and US Army Veteran "The Patriot Paul Severe", aka Jared Keefe. In 2016, the winner was "Rescue 911", aka Christopher Annino.

== Personal life and death ==
Douglas Baker was married to Darlene Doyle Baker from 1959 until her death in 1989. He later remarried in 1996 to Peggy Ann Kawa until her death in 2010. Baker had two children, Garren and Meghan. Garren died in 2022.

=== Death ===
Baker died on October 20, 2014, in Hartford, Connecticut, due to complications from a heart attack he suffered earlier that year.

== Legacy ==
Ox Baker is considered one of professional wrestling’s most iconic territory-era heels, renowned for his physique, long mustache, and his signature Heart Punch finisher. His gimmick, amplified by the real-life deaths of two opponents shortly after matches against him (Alberto Torres in 1971 and Ray Gunkel in 1972), created a aura of danger that drew crowds and occasionally sparked fan riots.

Baker received several honors, including induction into the New England Pro Wrestling Hall of Fame in 2009 and a posthumous induction into the NWA Hall of Fame in 2014.

== Championships and accomplishments ==
- All Star Pro Wrestling (New Zealand)
  - NWA Australasian Tag Team Championship (1 time) – with King Kamaka
- American Wrestling Association
  - AWA Midwest Tag Team Championship (3 times) – with Rock Rogowski (1), The Claw (1) and The Great Kusatsu (1)
- Atlantic Coast Wrestling
  - ACW Tag Team Championship (1 time) – with Purple Haze
- Big Time Wrestling
  - NWA United States Heavyweight Championship (Detroit Version) (1 time)
- Cauliflower Alley Club
  - Other honoree (2002)
- Central States Wrestling
  - NWA North American Tag Team Championship (Central States Version) (1 time) – with Luke Brown
- Championship Wrestling from Florida
  - NWA Florida Tag Team Championship (1 time) – with Superstar Billy Graham
  - NWA Southern Heavyweight Championship (Florida version) (1 time)
- International Wrestling Association
  - IWA North American Heavyweight Championship (1 time)
- Memphis Wrestling Hall of Fame
  - Class of 2022
- Mid-Atlantic Championship Wrestling
  - NWA Mid-Atlantic Tag Team Championship (1 time) – with Carl Fergie
- Mid-South Sports
  - NWA Georgia Tag Team Championship (1 time) – with Skandor Akbar
- Midwest Championship Wrestling
  - MCW International Heavyweight Championship (1 time)
- National Wrestling Alliance
  - NWA Hall of Fame (2014)
- NWA Big Time Wrestling
  - NWA American Heavyweight Championship (2 times)
  - NWA Texas Heavyweight Championship (1 time)
- NWA Hollywood Wrestling
  - NWA Americas Tag Team Championship (1 time) – with Enforcer Luciano
  - NWA World Tag Team Championship (Los Angeles version) (1 time) – with Enforcer Luciano
- NWA New Zealand
  - NWA British Commonwealth Heavyweight Championship (1 time)
- National Wrestling Federation
  - NWF North American Heavyweight Championship (2 times)
- New England Pro Wrestling Hall of Fame
  - Class of 2009
- Pro Wrestling Academy (Connecticut)
  - Ox Baker "Old School" Heavyweight Championship (1 time)
- Pro Wrestling Illustrated
  - Ranked No. 360 of the top 500 singles wrestlers in the PWI Years in 2003
- Southeastern Championship Wrestling
  - NWA Southeastern Heavyweight Championship (Southern Division) (1 time)
- United States Wrestling Federation
  - USWF Tag Team Championship (1 time) – with Killer Kowalski
- Stampede Wrestling
  - Stampede North American Heavyweight Championship (1 time)
- St. Louis Wrestling Hall of Fame
  - Class of 2025
- World Championship Wrestling (Australia)
  - NWA Austra-Asian Tag Team Championship (1 time) – with Butcher Brannigan
- World Wrestling Association
  - WWA World Heavyweight Championship (1 time)
  - WWA World Tag Team Championship (1 time) – with Chuck O'Connor
- World Wrestling Council
  - WWC Puerto Rico Heavyweight Championship (1 time)
  - WWC Universal Heavyweight Championship (1 time)

== See also ==
- List of oldest surviving professional wrestlers
