= Ghana (album) =

2002 compilation album by The Mountain Goats

Compilation album by the Mountain Goats
- Released: April 2, 2002
- Genre: Folk-rock, lo-fi, rock
- Length: 68:26
- Label: 3 Beads of Sweat
- Producer: John Darnielle

The Mountain Goats chronology
Bitter Melon Farm (1999)	Ghana (2002)

Professional ratings
Review scores
Source	Rating
AllMusic	4/5 stars
Pitchfork	8.9/10

Ghana is third in a three-part series of compilations of songs by The Mountain Goats that have appeared on various releases. It is preceded by Protein Source of the Future...Now!, and Bitter Melon Farm.

== Track listing ==
All tracks are written by John Darnielle.

No.	Title	Original release	Length
1.	"Golden Boy"	Object Lessons: Songs About Products	3:16
2.	"Pure Gold"	Songs About Fire	1:50
3.	"Papagallo"	Songs About Fire	1:54
4.	"Song for John Davis"	Songs About Fire	2:20
5.	"Stars Around Her"	Songs About Fire	2:14
6.	"Going to Port Washington"	The Wedding Record	2:04
7.	"Blood Royal"	Orange Raja, Blood Royal	2:04
8.	"The Only Thing I Know"	Orange Raja, Blood Royal	3:04
9.	"Raja Vocative"	Orange Raja, Blood Royal	2:06
10.	"Hatha Hill"	Orange Raja, Blood Royal	1:32
11.	"Going to Kirby Sigston"	Previously Unreleased	1:59
12.	"Please Come Home to Hamngatan"	We'll Sail Out Far... Maybe a Little Too Far...	2:52
13.	"The Last Day of Jimi Hendrix's Life"	Cool Beans #4	2:11
14.	"Orange Ball of Peace"	Taking the Dative	1:25
15.	"Standard Bitter Love Song #8"	Taking the Dative	2:46
16.	"Chino Love Song 1979"	Taking the Dative	2:12
17.	"Wrong!"	Taking the Dative	2:18
18.	"Going to Jamaica"	Taking the Dative	2:34
19.	"Alpha Gelida"	Taking the Dative	1:59
20.	"Wild Palm City (aka Within You, Without You)"	Back to the Egg, Asshole	2:31
21.	"The Anglo-Saxons"	The Basement Tapes: Live Recordings at KSPC 1989-1995	1:49
22.	"Flight 717: Going to Denmark"	Corkscrewed	2:17
23.	"The Admonishing Song"	Corkscrewed	2:28
24.	"Anti-Music Song"	Tropical Depression	1:31
25.	"Going to Hungary"	Tropical Depression	2:30
26.	"Earth Air Water Trees"	Tropical Depression	2:18
27.	"Creature Song"	Goar #11	1:50
28.	"Pure Sound"	Goar #11	1:41
29.	"Going to Maine"	Hardcore Acoustic	1:41
30.	"Noctifer Birmingham"	Fast Forward 2	2:30
31.	"Leaving Home"	Cyanide Guilt Trip	2:41

== Personnel ==
- John Darnielle - Vocals, acoustic guitar
- Rachel Ware - Bass guitar, backing vocals (2, 5, 6, 11, 21, 30)
- Alastair Galbraith - Violin, etc. (7–10)

== Cover versions ==
- Michael and the G2s cover "Going to Port Washington" in their album Michael and the G2s Cover Everything.
