= Leela Corman =

American cartoonist

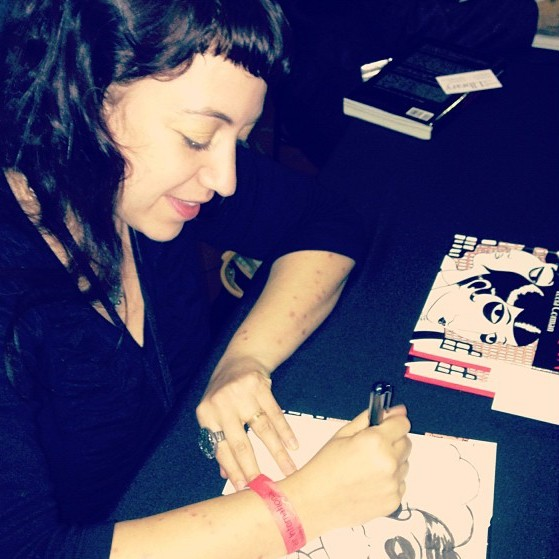
- Born: 1972 (age 53–54) Massachusetts, U.S.
- Area: Cartoonist
- Notable works: Unterzakhn
- Awards: Xeric Award, 1999
- Spouse: Tom Hart

Leela Corman is an American cartoonist and illustrator. Corman created the 2012 graphic novel Unterzakhn, which follows the lives of Jewish twin sisters growing up in the tenements of Manahttan's Lower East Side at the turn of the last century. Unterzakhn was published by Schocken Books and nominated for the Los Angeles Times Book Award, the Eisner Award, and Le Prix Artemisia. Portions of Unterzakhn were serialized in HEEB magazine and Lilith magazine.

== Early life and college years ==
Corman was born in 1972 in Massachusetts. Her father's side of the family is Russian Jewish, while her mother's side is Jewish from Poland. Leela's grandmother taught her Yiddish, which became a common motif in her work. Corman's grandfather lost several family members in the Holocaust. Corman became interested in comics at the age of 13 and went on to study painting, printmaking, and illustration at the Massachusetts College of Art, She self-published three issues of the minicomic, Flimflam, while still in college, and won a 1999 Xeric Grant for the graphic novel Queen’s Day.

== Career ==
Corman's illustrations have appeared on album covers and for PBS, The New York Times, and BUST Magazine. Corman also has other short comic publications in Nautilus Magazine, The Nib, Tablet Magazine, Symbolia, and The OC Weekly. She teaches at the Sequential Artists Workshop (SAW) in Gainesville, Florida, a low-cost school for comic arts and at the University of Florida. She was also an adjunct professor at the University of Florida's College of Fine Arts and a founding instructor at Sequential Artists Workshop in Gainesville. Later, she became a faculty member at the Rhode Island School of Design. Corman remains an online teacher at SAW.

Corman has also worked on album covers, having illustrated the covers for Beat the Champ and Goths by The Mountain Goats.

Corman has had works published in the US, as well as Portugal, Spain, and France. Corman has stated that she is interested in addressing the life of women through a feminine perspective, offering representation for women and by women. She describes her creative process as going between thumb-nailing and writing and relies a lot on the experiences of her Jewish family for inspiration.

=== Unterzakhn ===
Unterzakhn is Corman's second graphic novel and uses simplistic black and white drawings to illustrate the lives of twin Jewish girls in the turn of the last century on the Lower East Side. Corman's focus on the Jewish experience in New York earned her a role in the Yiddish community in the US as well as abroad. Unterzakhn has been translated into Dutch, Spanish, French, and Italian. Reviewer Laura Dattaro writes that, "The book is a sweetly sad story, illustrating the difficulty of life in the early 20th century as seen through the narrow eye of a specific subculture." Columnist Joe Gross reviews Unterzakhn as, "A haunting and often heartbreaking look at Eastern European Jewish immigrants in the early 20th century... is also a story about women, power and bodies."

== Personal life ==
Corman is married to fellow cartoonist (and SAW faculty member) Tom Hart. Corman met Hart in Gainesville, Florida, where they currently reside and he was also a co-founder of the Sequential Artists Workshop. Hart's book Rosalie Lightning (St. Martin's Press, 2016) is named after their daughter, who died suddenly when she was almost two, and is about Hart and Corman's grief and their attempts to make sense of their life afterwards. Corman addressed the loss of her loss of the child in her work, “PTSD: The Wound That Never Heals”, published by Nautilus Magazine. She credited her work to being a type of exposure therapy. The couple have since had another child.

== Bibliography ==
- Flimflam (self-published)
- Queen's Day (1999)
- Subway Series (Alternative Comics, 2002) ISBN 978-1-891867-14-9
- Too Much Love in Put the Book Back on the Shelf: A Belle & Sebastian Anthology (Image Comics, 2006) ISBN 978-1-582406-00-8
- Unterzakhn (Schocken/Pantheon Books, 2012) ISBN 978-0-805242-59-1
- We All Wish For Deadly Force (Retrofit, 2016)
- Victory Parade (Schocken Books, 2024) ISBN 978-0-805243-44-4

== Awards and nominations ==
Corman's first award was a Xerix Award in 1999 for her first graphic novel, Queen's Day. For her 2012 graphic novel, Unterzakhn, Corman earned a Le Prix Millepages award and best Anglo-American comic at Rome Festival. She was also nominated for an LA Times Book Award, Eisner award, and Le Prix Artemisia in France.
