= Set list =

Ordered list of elements an artist intends to present

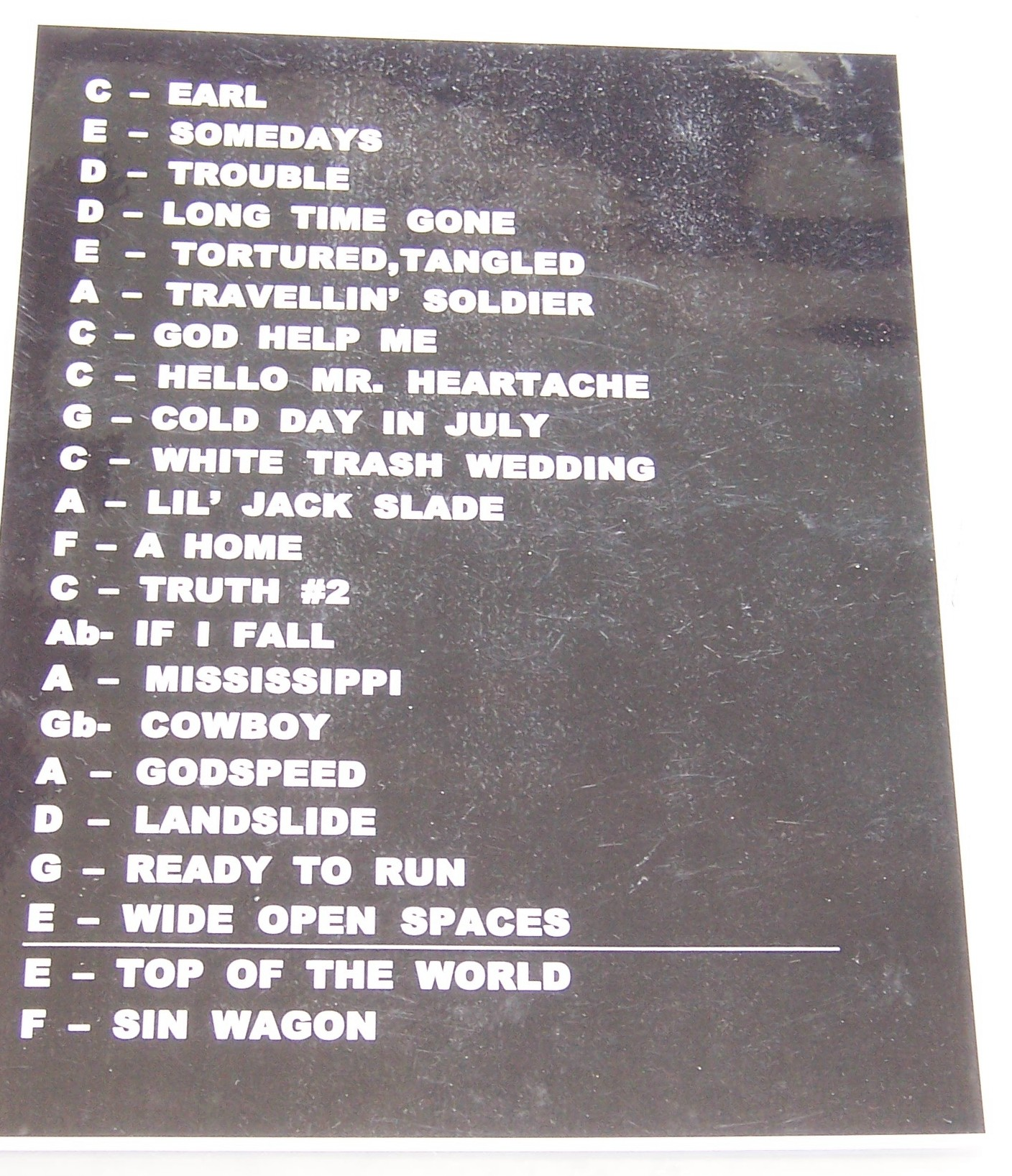
9" × 12" laminate set list from a the Chicks concert in 2003. In this instance, the keys the songs are played in are also given. The horizontal line (or a wide blank space) near the bottom delineates the encore.

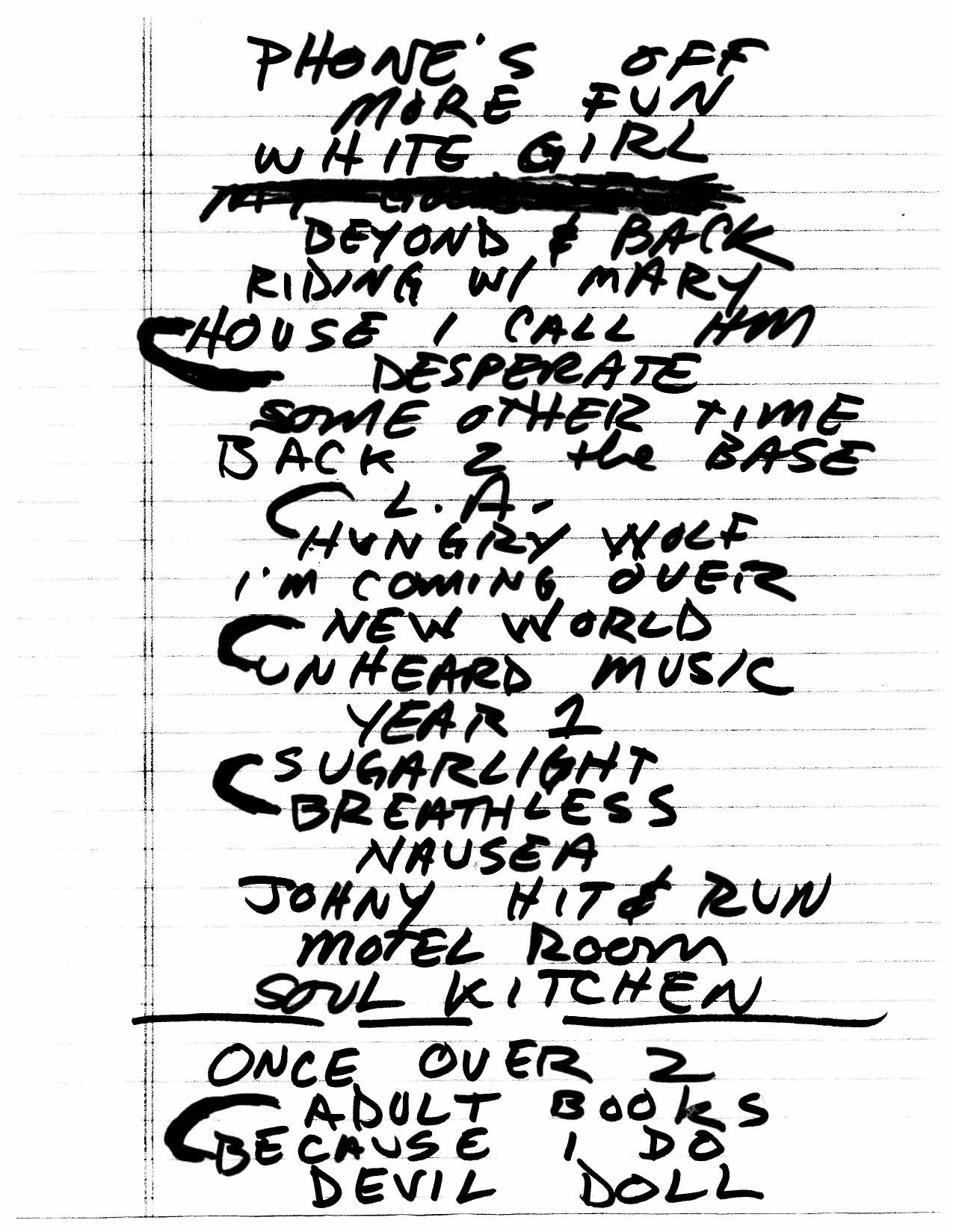
Setlist by X at the Theatre of Living Arts in Philadelphia

A set list, or setlist, is typically a handwritten or printed document created as an ordered list of songs, jokes, stories and other elements an artist intends to present during a specific performance.

Artists and bands use setlists for a variety of reasons beyond the mere order of performance events. They are often used to help create the set's overall mood by establishing a memorable sense of range and variety in tone, tempo and dynamics between songs.

They are also used to create sets for specific audiences and locations. An increasingly common application is the use of technologies such as instant polling on social media and websites, where fans can choose material to be performed.

Many performers also craft their playlists to highlight other elements of their shows, such as visual ambiance, choreography, or to refer to specific albums or phases of their careers.

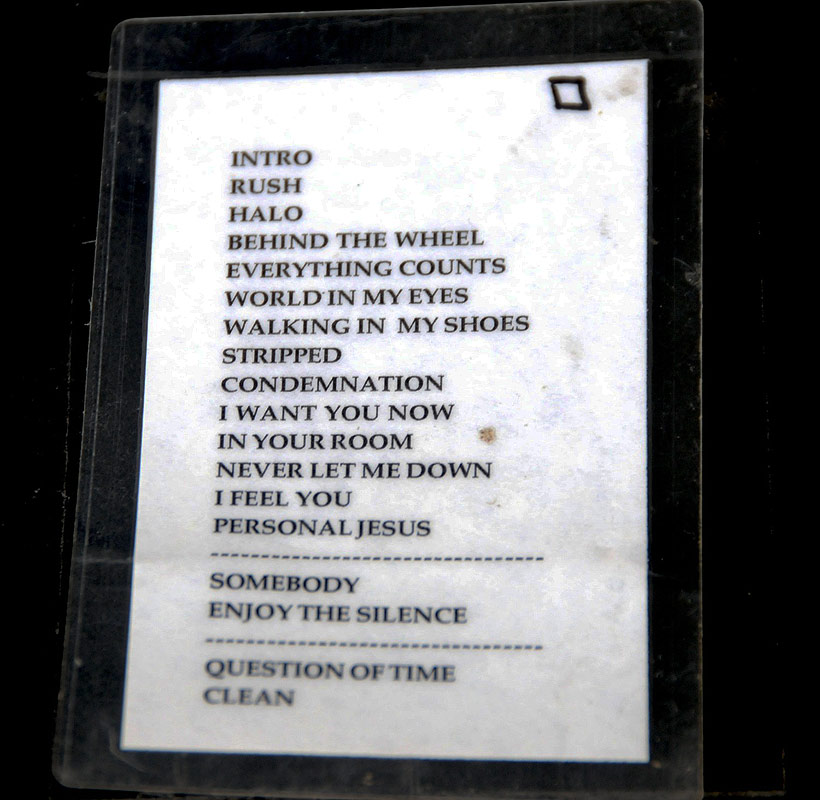
A laminated Depeche Mode setlist

There are websites such as Setlist.fm that track and report information on such things as the venue and bands on the bill of each date, as well as which band members were in attendance, copies of the show posters and other memorabilia available, and most importantly, the actual setlist used for that particular event. This is done to provide a more accurate record of each individual show, which is later used to differentiate between performances during a tour, as many artists will change their setlist from one night to another. In the pre-smartphone era, devoted followers attending concerts of popular artists such as Bruce Springsteen or Led Zeppelin, which have very large fan bases spanning the globe, often took on the task of tracking which songs were played and in what order, creating their own handwritten version of the correct setlist for the event to be shared later with other fans through fan clubs and other forums. When early mobile phones became commonplace with the general public, people began using text-messaging to report the songs played in real-time to a friend or fellow fan who would then update a running setlist on one or more Internet forums devoted to the performer of the night. When Internet-connected smartphones came about, fans began to post the setlists directly to these forums and websites themselves, often as part of a running play-by-play commentary of their concert experiences on social media sites such as Myspace and later Twitter (now known as X).

Setlists have become collectibles, with fans often waiting after a concert to take one off the stage after a performance or to request one from road crew or other event staff.
