= Hex of Infinite Binding =

Album by The Mountain Goats

EP by the Mountain Goats
- Released: September 7, 2018
- Recorded: 2017
- Genre: Indie rock; indie folk
- Length: 14:19

The Mountain Goats chronology
Goths (2017)	Hex of Infinite Binding (2018)

Hex of Infinite Binding is an EP by the Mountain Goats, self-released online on September 7, 2018.

== Reception ==
In their review, online music magazine Pitchfork gave Hex of Infinite Binding a score of 7.4/10.

== Track listing ==
No.	Title	Length
1.	"Song for Ted Sallis"	3:30
2.	"Almost Every Door"	4:30
3.	"Hospital Reaction Shot"	4:04
4.	"Tucson Fog"	2:15

== Personnel ==
- John Darnielle - guitars, vocals, possibly some keyboard
- Matt Douglas - woodwinds, vocals, harmony vocals, probably some keyboard
- Matt Espy - percussion (“Almost Every Door” and “Song for Ted Sallis”)
- Chris Stamey - electric guitar, bass guitar, and string arrangement (“Hospital Reaction Shot”)
- Leah Gibson - cello (“Hospital Reaction Shot”)
- Aubrey Keisel - viola and violin (“Hospital Reaction Shot”)
- Jon Wurster - drums and percussion (“Hospital Reaction Shot”)
