= Goths (album) =

2017 album by the Mountain Goats

Studio album by the Mountain Goats
- Released: May 19, 2017
- Recorded: 2017
- Studio: Blackbird Studio (Nashville, Tennessee)
- Genres: Indie rock; indie folk
- Length: 55:08
- Label: Merge
- Producers: Brandon Eggleston; Scott Solter

The Mountain Goats chronology
Beat the Champ (2015)	Goths (2017)	In League With Dragons (2019)

Singles from Goths
- 1. "Rain in Soho" Released: 2017; 2. "Andrew Eldritch Is Moving Back To Leeds" Released: 2017

Goths is the sixteenth studio album by the Mountain Goats, released on May 19, 2017, on Merge Records. The band has stated that Goths was inspired by an adolescence listening to The Cure, Bauhaus, Siouxsie and the Banshees, and Joy Division, as well as hearing songs on the radio station KROQ-FM. The album also marked the band's first release as a four-piece outfit, having added touring member Matt Douglas (keyboards/woodwinds) as a permanent fixture of the band following the By, For, and About the Trees Southeastern Fall Tour that supported their previous record, Beat the Champ.

The album was critically acclaimed upon release. In the U.S., it peaked at number 89 on the Billboard 200.

== Background ==
Singer John Darnielle spent his teenage years listening to dark music and was attracted by outsiders at school. In 2014, prior to recording Goths, he performed live a cover version of "Spellbound", a single by one of his favorite bands Siouxsie and the Banshees.

== Content ==
For the album, Darnielle wrote lyrics with references to some of his favorite bands. On "Abandoned Flesh", they sing: The Cure's Robert Smith may be "secure at his villa in France" and Siouxsie Sioux "had enough hits to keep the bills paid". The Guardian describes Darnielle's writing as "evocative", with lines such as "Outside it's 92 degrees and KROQ is playing Siouxsie and the Banshees", "92°" being the title of a Siouxsie song from the album Tinderbox. The track "Andrew Eldritch Is Moving Back to Leeds" is a description of the Sisters of Mercy frontman. "Rain in Soho" includes the line "There's a club where you'd like to go You could meet someone who's lost like you" an allusion to The Smiths, "How Soon is Now?". The lyrics have been described as a mix of "wry insight and black humor". Musically, the songs have been compared to artists such as Nick Cave, Prefab Sprout, and New Order.

Bassist Peter Hughes described the album's theme as goth, covering the bands that "never made it out of Fender's Ballroom, the Gene Loves Jezebels of the world—the ones whose gothic paths were overtaken by the realities of life, or of its opposite." Track #10, "Shelved", is the first Mountain Goats song to feature lyrics written by Hughes.

Goths is the first Mountain Goats album not to feature any guitars, excluding bass guitar. Darnielle's parts on both acoustic and electric pianos are relatively sparse on most tracks, leaving room for elaborate, Steely Dan-esque saxophone arrangements on tracks like "Paid in Cocaine" and "Abandoned Flesh" and trilling flutes on "Andrew Eldritch..." and "Unicorn Tolerance". Various social media posts by Darnielle in 2017-18 allude to nagging tendinitis as a factor in the decision to eschew guitars, in addition to a broader desire to impose a creative constraint on himself in the spirit of Brian Eno's Oblique Strategies. Darnielle has since performed Goths songs on the guitar, including an arrangement of "Rain in Soho" on his Paul Reed Smith electric baritone guitar.

== Release ==
The album was announced by Merge on February 22, 2017, after which the second track, "Andrew Eldritch Is Moving Back to Leeds", was released for streaming on the band's Bandcamp page. The announcement was accompanied by a Facebook live stream. The second single, "Rain in Soho", was released Apr 25, 2017 on Merge's YouTube channel.

The album was released May 19, 2017, on Merge Records. A special edition is available, which comes with an additional 12" record featuring four ambient non-album tracks.

== Reception ==
Professional ratings
Aggregate scores
Source	Rating
Metacritic	83/100
Review scores
Source	Rating
AllMusic	4/5 stars
A.V. Club	B
Exclaim!	9/10
The Guardian	4/5 stars
Pitchfork Media	8/10
Slant Magazine	4/5 stars
The Line of Best Fit	7/10
Under The Radar	8/10

Goths was acclaimed by music critics. At Metacritic, which assigns a normalized rating out of 100 to reviews from mainstream critics, the album received an average score of 83 (based on 20 reviews) indicating "universal acclaim". Stereogum named Goths its Album of the Week among May 19, 2017 releases.

== Track listing ==
All tracks are written by John Darnielle, except where noted.

No.	Title	Length
1.	"Rain in Soho"	4:46
2.	"Andrew Eldritch Is Moving Back to Leeds"	4:18
3.	"The Grey King and the Silver Flame Attunement"	4:54
4.	"We Do It Different on the West Coast"	5:21
5.	"Unicorn Tolerance"	5:24
6.	"Stench of the Unburied"	4:30
7.	"Wear Black"	4:11
8.	"Paid in Cocaine"	3:57
9.	"Rage of Travers"	5:54
10.	"Shelved" (John Darnielle and Peter Hughes)	4:01
11.	"For the Portuguese Goth Metal Bands"	4:10
12.	"Abandoned Flesh"	3:42

Deluxe edition bonus 12"
No.	Title	Length
13.	"For the West Coast Dark Ambient Bedroom Warriors"	4:36
14.	"Scaling the Well"	4:54
15.	"Vanishing Act"	4:05
16.	"Grave Dust"	4:23

== Personnel ==
- John Darnielle – vocals, piano, rhodes piano, lyrics, composition
- Peter Hughes – bass, vocals, lyrics ("Shelved")
- Jon Wurster – drums, percussion
- Matt Douglas – woodwind, woodwind arrangement, vocals, additional keys
- Robert Bailey – vocal arrangement, background vocals
- Dan Perry – vocal arrangement
- Rob Carmichael – graphic design, typography
- Leela Corman – cover illustration, additional illustrations
- Brandon Eggleston – producer
- Scott Solter – mixing
- Michael Mishaw – background vocals
- Jason Eskridge – background vocals
- Everett Drake – background vocals

== Charts ==
Chart (2017)	Peak position
New Zealand Heatseekers Albums (RMNZ)	6
Scottish Albums (Official Charts)	85
US Billboard 200	89
