= Zopilote Machine =

Studio album by the Mountain Goats
- Released: July 11, 1994
- Recorded: 1994
- Genre: Lo-fi
- Length: 40:45
- Label: Ajax, 3 Beads of Sweat
- Producer: John Darnielle

The Mountain Goats chronology
Hot Garden Stomp (1993)	Zopilote Machine (1994)	Sweden (1995)

Professional ratings
Review scores
Source	Rating
AllMusic	3.5/5 stars

Zopilote Machine is the 1994 debut studio album by the Mountain Goats. ("Zopilote" is Spanish for buzzard.) Note, however, that the Mountain Goats had been active since 1991, and before releasing this album had issued multiple long-playing cassette releases, as well as EPs (extended play records) and songs contributed to compilations. Zopilote Machine was originally released on CD only by Ajax Records in July 1994. In March 2005, it was re-released in CD and LP formats by the 3 Beads of Sweat label. It is the only full Mountain Goats album to include the entirety of The Bright Mountain Choir.

Critical retrospectives have noted that Zopilote Machine contains early examples of several song cycles and thematic preoccupations that would become central to John Darnielle's songwriting. The album features three tracks from what would become the Alpha series - "Alpha Incipiens," "Alpha Sun Hat," and "Alpha in Tauris" — early installments in the story of the dysfunctional couple whose story would span multiple albums before culminating in 2002's Tallahassee - a concept album about the Alpha Couple. Additionally, the album includes three entries in Darnielle's "Going To..." series and three songs drawing on Aztec mythology, establishing patterns that would recur throughout the Mountain Goats' discography.

== Track listing ==
All tracks are written by John Darnielle.

No.	Title	Length
1.	"Alpha Incipiens"	1:36
2.	"Azo Tle Nelli in Tlalticpac?"	3:02
3.	"Alpha Sun Hat"	1:24
4.	"The Black Ice Cream Song"	2:03
5.	"Sinaloan Milk Snake Song"	2:14
6.	"We Have Seen the Enemy"	1:53
7.	"Standard Bitter Love Song #7"	2:22
8.	"Quetzalcoatl Eats Plums"	2:25
9.	"Orange Ball of Love"	2:12
10.	"Orange Ball of Hate"	2:09
11.	"Bad Priestess"	1:29
12.	"Going to Bristol"	2:02
13.	"Young Caesar 2000"	2:17
14.	"Going to Lebanon"	2:29
15.	"Grendel's Mother"	2:20
16.	"Song for Tura Satana"	2:03
17.	"Alpha in Tauris"	2:09
18.	"Going to Georgia"	2:15
19.	"Quetzalcoatl Is Born"	2:21
Total length:		40:45

== Release history ==
Date	Label	Format	Catalogue number
11 July 1994	Ajax Records	CD	AJAX 036
29 March 2005	3 Beads of Sweat	CD, LP	3BOS 1006

== Personnel ==
John Darnielle — vocals, guitar

The Bright Mountain Choir (Rachel Ware, Amy Piatt, Sarah Arslanian, Roseanne Lindley) — vocals
