= In League with Dragons =

Album by The Mountain Goats

In League With Dragons

Studio album by the Mountain Goats
- Released: April 26, 2019
- Recorded: 2018–2019
- Studio: Blackbird Studio (Nashville, Tennessee)
- Genre: Alternative rock
- Length: 48:22
- Label: Merge
- Producer: Owen Pallett

The Mountain Goats chronology
Goths (2017)	In League With Dragons (2019)	Songs for Pierre Chuvin (2020)

Singles from In League With Dragons
- 1. "Passaic, 1975" Released: 2019 (Note: Released as "Welcome to Passaic".); 2. "Younger" Released: 2019

In League With Dragons is the seventeenth studio album by the Mountain Goats, released on April 26, 2019, on Merge Records. Inspired by tabletop role-playing games such as Dungeons & Dragons, the album has been described as a "partial rock opera" with influences from noir literature.

== Background ==
Indie rock band the Mountain Goats released their 16th full-length studio album, Goths, on May 19, 2017, via Merge Records. The album was inspired by John Darnielle's childhood enjoyment of gothic rock. After supporting Jason Isbell on tour in June and July 2017, the Mountain Goats went on a North American headlining tour from September through December 2017 in support of Goths.

== Release ==
The album was announced on January 28, 2019. The announcement was accompanied by a live streaming event on Facebook and Twitch, hosted by Wizards of the Coast. The band also released three singles from the album: "Younger", "Cadaver Sniffing Dog", and "Sicilian Crest". The release of "Sicilian Crest" was accompanied by an hour-long discussion about the making of the song by frontman John Darnielle and podcaster Joseph Fink, on the podcast I Only Listen to the Mountain Goats; season two of the podcast consisted of a track-by-track discussion of each song on the album.

The album was released on April 26, 2019, on Merge Records. Special editions of the album come with an additional 7-inch record, Sentries in the Ambush EP, featuring two non-album tracks.

== Track listing ==
All tracks are written by John Darnielle.

No.	Title	Length
1.	"Done Bleeding"	4:38
2.	"Younger"	5:52
3.	"Passaic 1975"	3:55
4.	"Clemency for the Wizard King"	2:47
5.	"Possum by Night"	2:59
6.	"In League with Dragons"	3:11
7.	"Doc Gooden"	4:19
8.	"Going Invisible 2"	3:05
9.	"Waylon Jennings Live!"	3:15
10.	"Cadaver Sniffing Dog"	3:55
11.	"An Antidote for Strychnine"	6:04
12.	"Sicilian Crest"	4:22
Total length:		48:22

Sentries in the Ambush EP (special edition bonus 7")
No.	Title	Length
13.	"Sentries in the Ambush"	2:48
14.	"Divided Sky Lane"	3:38

== Reception ==
Professional ratings
Aggregate scores
Source	Rating
Metacritic	77/100
Review scores
Source	Rating
AllMusic	4/5 stars
Consequence of Sound	B−
The Guardian	4/5 stars
Pitchfork	7.4/10
Rolling Stone	3.5/5 stars

At Metacritic, which assigns a normalised rating out of 100 to reviews from mainstream critics, the album received an average score of 77 (based on 14 reviews) indicating "generally favorable reviews".

== Personnel ==
- John Darnielle – vocals, piano, lyrics, composition
- Peter Hughes – bass
- Jon Wurster – drums, percussion
- Matt Douglas – woodwinds, guitars, vocals
- Thom Gill – guitars
- Johnny Spence – organ, Memorymoog, piano, Wurlitzer, synth
- Bram Gielen – guitars, piano, synth
- Owen Pallett – piano, organ, guitar, production
- Dan Dugmore – pedal steel
- Robert Bailey – vocal arrangements, vocals
- Everett Drake – vocals
- Jason Eskridge – vocals
- Michael Mishaw – vocals
- The Macedonian Radio Symphonic Orchestra – strings
  - strings arranged by Owen Pallett, conducted by Oleg Kondratenko, engineered by Giorgi Hristovski with Atanas Babaleski
- Matt Ross-Spang – engineering
- Shani Gandhi – mixing
- Brent Lambert – mastering
- Elton D'Souza – artwork
- Daniel Murphy – design

== Charts ==
Chart (2019)	Peak position
Australian Digital Albums (ARIA)	33
Scottish Albums (Official Charts)	65
US Billboard 200	110
US Top Alternative Albums (Billboard)	9
US Americana/Folk Albums (Billboard)	5
US Top Rock Albums (Billboard)	16
