= Get Lonely =

2006 studio album by the Mountain Goats

Studio album by the Mountain Goats
- Released: August 21, 2006
- Studio: Prairie Sun Recording Studios, (Cotati, California)
- Genre: Folk rock; indie rock
- Length: 42:36
- Label: 4AD
- Producer: Scott Solter

The Mountain Goats chronology
The Sunset Tree (2005)	Get Lonely (2006)	Heretic Pride (2008)

Professional ratings
Aggregate scores
Source	Rating
Metacritic	75/100
Review scores
Source	Rating
AllMusic	4/5 stars
Blender	3/5 stars
Entertainment Weekly	B
The Guardian	3/5 stars
Mojo	3/5 stars
Pitchfork	7.6/10
Q	3/5 stars
Rolling Stone	3.5/5 stars
Spin	4/5 stars
Uncut	4/5 stars

Get Lonely is the tenth studio album by the Mountain Goats, released in the UK on August 21, 2006 on 4AD. It was released in the US on the following day, August 22, and in Japan on December 6, 2006. It peaked at #193 on the Billboard top 200 album chart. At least four outtakes from the album circulate - 'Naming Day', 'Keeping House', 'They are Stone Swallowers' and 'Going Invisible'.

== Track listing ==
All tracks are written by John Darnielle, except where noted.

No.	Title	Length
1.	"Wild Sage"	4:13
2.	"New Monster Avenue"	3:38
3.	"Half Dead"	3:26
4.	"Get Lonely"	3:50
5.	"Maybe Sprout Wings"	2:46
6.	"Moon Over Goldsboro"	5:02
7.	"In the Hidden Places"	4:21
8.	"Song for Lonely Giants"	3:10
9.	"Woke Up New"	2:57
10.	"If You See Light"	1:58
11.	"Cobra Tattoo"	3:10
12.	"In Corolla" (John Darnielle, Franklin Bruno)	4:05
Total length:		42:36

Japanese bonus tracks
No.	Title	Length
13.	"Naming Day"	3:11
14.	"They Are Stone Swallowers"	3:08
15.	"Keeping House"	2:38
Total length:		51:33

== Personnel ==
- John Darnielle - vocals, piano, acoustic guitar, electric guitar
- Peter Hughes - bass, percussion, vibraphone
- Franklin Bruno - piano, organ, horn arrangements, acoustic guitar, electric guitar
- Corey Fogel - drums
- Erik Friedlander - cello, string arrangements
- Gene Baker - trumpet
- Jen Baker - trombone
- Scott Solter - percussion, vibraphone, "landscapes", production
- Aaron Prellwitz - engineering
- Timin Murray - engineering
