= Protein Source of the Future...Now! =

Protein Source of the Future...NOW!

Compilation album by the Mountain Goats
- Released: 1999, April 23, 2002
- Recorded: 1993–1995
- Genre: Folk-rock, lo-fi, rock
- Length: 50:25
- Label: Ajax, 3 Beads of Sweat
- Producer: John Darnielle

The Mountain Goats chronology
| Protein Source of the Future...NOW! (1999) | Bitter Melon Farm (1999) |

Professional ratings
Review scores
| Source | Rating |
|---|---|
| Allmusic | 4/5 stars |
| Pitchfork | 8.5/10 (1999); 8.0/10 (2002) |
| Stylus Magazine | A− |

Protein Source of the Future...Now! is the first in a three-part series of compilations by the Mountain Goats, released in 1999 by Ajax Records. The two compilations that follow Protein Source of the Future...Now! are Bitter Melon Farm and Ghana.

== Notes ==
The album's title is derived from the book The Book of Tofu: Protein Source of the Future...Now! by William Shurtleff and Akiko Aoyagi.

== Track listing ==
All tracks are written by John Darnielle.

| No. | Title | Original release | Length |
|---|---|---|---|
| 1. | "Going to Tennessee" | Why You All So Thief? | 2:45 |
| 2. | "Pure Heat" | Why You All So Thief? | 2:31 |
| 3. | "Hand Ball" | Our Salvation Is in Hand | 2:37 |
| 4. | "The Window Song" | Pawnshop Reverb | 2:20 |
| 5. | "Night of the Mules" | Chile de Árbol | 1:39 |
| 6. | "Going to Malibu" | Chile de Árbol | 2:02 |
| 7. | "Billy the Kid's Dream of the Magic Shoes" | Chile de Árbol | 2:06 |
| 8. | "Fresh Berries for You" | Chile de Árbol | 3:32 |
| 9. | "Alphabetizing" | Chile de Árbol | 2:00 |
| 10. | "Third Snow Song" | Philyra | 1:44 |
| 11. | "The Monkey Song" | Philyra | 2:00 |
| 12. | "Love Cuts the Strings" | Philyra | 2:22 |
| 13. | "Pure Honey" | Philyra | 1:44 |
| 14. | "Duke Ellington" | The Long Secret, A Harriet Records Compilation | 2:31 |
| 15. | "Seed Song" | Yam, the King of Crops | 2:16 |
| 16. | "Quetzalcoatal Comes Through" | Yam, the King of Crops | 1:59 |
| 17. | "Omega Blaster" | Yam, the King of Crops | 2:05 |
| 18. | "Coco-Yam Song" | Yam, the King of Crops | 1:53 |
| 19. | "Alagemo" | Yam, the King of Crops | 2:23 |
| 20. | "Two Thousand Seasons" | Yam, the King of Crops | 1:40 |
| 21. | "Chinese Rifle Song" | Yam, the King of Crops | 1:55 |
| 22. | "Yam, the King of Crops" | Yam, the King of Crops | 2:00 |
| 23. | "Alpha Omega" | Our Salvation Is in Hand | 2:21 |

== Personnel ==
- John Darnielle - vocals, guitar, keyboard
