= Pattern Is Movement =

American indie rock band

- Pattern Is Movement performing in 2008

Background information
- Origin: Philadelphia, Pennsylvania, United States
- Genres: Indie rock, math rock, experimental pop
- Years active: 2001–2015
- Labels: NFI, Hometapes
- Members: Andrew Thiboldeaux; Chris Ward
- Past members: Wade Hampton; Daniel McClain; Corey Duncan

Pattern Is Movement (often stylized as Pattern is Movement) is an American indie rock band from Philadelphia, Pennsylvania, that was established in 2001. They have been categorized by some reviewers as a math rock group and compared to groups such as Don Caballero, Sunny Day Real Estate and Pinback. However, as the band moved from a five-piece to a two-piece, their sound moved away from the angular sound of previous records and closer to a more melodic heavy composition structure with sing-a-long choruses. The current two-piece sound can be attributed to influences such as Dirty Projectors, Beirut and Grizzly Bear. In an interview with Baeble Music, Ward coined the band with the term "indie cabaret".

In 2006, producer and engineer Scott Solter (who has worked with John Vanderslice and the Mountain Goats) remixed the 2005 album Stowaway, which he had also recorded. This remix was considered unique due to its exclusivity to analog processes. Solter is credited on the album with "machines, razors, tape."

Since 2008, Pattern Is Movement have been performing as a two-piece. On the January 2008, issue of Philadelphia Weekly they were featured in a cover story citing "Four indie bands that can expect a big year". The band emerged with a new album, All Together, documenting the lineup in the spring of 2008, also recorded with Solter. In his favorable review, Pitchfork Media writer Joe Tangari described it as "an accessible album that nonetheless sounds unlike what any other band is doing".

In April 2009 they became one of Limewire's Featured Artists.

In 2015, after releasing their self-titled fourth album, Pattern Is Movement announced their farewell tour.

== Discography ==
- The (im)possibility of Longing (NFI) – 2004
- Stowaway (NFI) – 2005
- Scott Solter Plays Pattern Is Movement: Canonic (Hometapes) – 2006
- All Together (Hometapes) – 2008
- Pattern Is Movement (Hometapes) – 2014
