= Silo Sam =

American professional wrestler (1952–2005)

- Harris, then known as Little John, standing in the ring at Texas Stadium in 1985

Personal information
- Born: John Elmo Harris; September 12, 1952 Suitland, Maryland, U.S.
- Died: April 19, 2005 (aged 52) Manatee County, Florida, U.S.

Professional wrestling career
- Ring name(s): Silo Sam; Trapper John; Big John Harris; Little John
- Billed height: 7 ft 5 in (226 cm)
- Billed weight: 475 lb (215 kg)
- Billed from: Sugarcreek, Pennsylvania, U.S.
- Debut: 1984
- Retired: 1990

John Elmo Harris (September 12, 1952 – April 19, 2005) was an American professional wrestler and actor who became known under his ring name Silo Sam under the American Wrestling Association and for a brief stint with the WWE, where he was known as Trapper Jon.

== Life and career ==
=== Professional wrestling ===
Harris played basketball before his wrestling career. In 1984, he started wrestling professionally and first appeared under the ring name "Big John Harris" in Jerry Jarrett's Memphis-based CWA. In 1985, he worked as "Little John" for Fritz Von Erich's World Class Championship Wrestling and acted as the bodyguard for The Fantastics (Bobby Fulton and Tommy Rogers). He would guide The Fantastics to winning the tag team titles in March 1987.

In 1986, he had a short appearance for the American Wrestling Association as Silo Sam. Because of his large size, he primarily wrestled in handicap matches. He was interviewed by AWA's Ken Resnick and replied to his questions with "Yup" every time. At one point in June 1987, he made an appearance in the World Wrestling Federation as Trapper John and wrestled in a dark match, but was never used again. He remained under the WWF's payroll for about a year, unused and never brought into television tapings. He retired from professional wrestling by 1990.

=== Acting ===
During the midst of his wrestling career, Harris played minor roles in several films, including Tell Me a Riddle (1980), Blood Circus (1985) and Pee-wee's Big Adventure (1985), appearing in the latter as Andy, a jealous boyfriend who chases Pee-wee.

=== Later life ===
After leaving the wrestling life in 1990, he went back to every day life, he worked as a welder at some point in Calvert County Maryland. He was also said to have mainly been a truck driver, and was an owner of several small businesses in his post wrestling and acting life.

== Personal life ==
Harris married Rayola Johnson in the mid-'80s, and divorced a few years later in Calvert County, Maryland.

== Death ==
Harris died at the age of 52 in Manatee County, Florida on April 19, 2005.

== Filmography ==
Year	Title	Role	Notes
1980	Tell Me a Riddle	Mathew	
1985	Pee-wee's Big Adventure	Andy	
1985	Blood Circus		(final film role)
