= Heretic Pride =

Studio album by the Mountain Goats
- Released: February 18, 2008
- Studios: Prairie Sun Recording Studios, (Cotati, California)
- Length: 44:37
- Label: 4AD
- Producers: Scott Solter, John Vanderslice

The Mountain Goats chronology
Get Lonely (2006)	Heretic Pride (2008)	The Life of the World to Come (2009)

Heretic Pride is the eleventh studio album by the Mountain Goats, released in the UK on February 18, 2008, and in the US on February 19 by 4AD, their sixth album on the label. It is the first to feature the band's lineup of John Darnielle, Peter Hughes, and Jon Wurster. The album was produced by Scott Solter and John Vanderslice.

== Notes ==
According to Pitchfork, the album takes its title from Aura Noir's song "Black Deluge Night" (found on their 2004 album The Merciless) which contains the couplet "Soaring demons now swarm the skies/ In awe and heretic pride".

A three-page comic book press kit was created for this album, with John Darnielle giving a brief text description of each song and songwriter/artist Jeffrey Lewis providing the illustrations. This art is not included in the album packaging, and was created only for promotional usage prior to release.

Backing vocals and guitar work were provided by Annie Clark, who later began recording under the name St. Vincent.

== Reception ==
Professional ratings
Aggregate scores
Source	Rating
Metacritic	74/100
Review scores
Source	Rating
Allmusic	4/5 stars
Blender	3/5 stars
Crawdaddy!	(favorable)
The Guardian	4/5 stars
NME	4/5 stars
Paste Magazine	4/5 stars
Pitchfork	(8.0/10)
Slant	2.5/5 stars
Sputnikmusic	4/5 stars
Twisted Ear	4/5 stars

Heretic Pride received mostly positive reviews, with website Metacritic projecting an aggregate score of 74/100. The Guardian critic Maddy Costa praised the album as "13 absorbing songs, sparingly orchestrated to concentrate attention on the lyrics [...] that grows more enveloping with every listen.". Pitchfork critic Zach Baron awarded the album a rating of 8.0/10, and notes that it marks a return to earlier Mountain Goats albums, both musically and lyrically, and praises the album for its balance, stating "For every furious declaration, there's a moment of uncertainty."

On the negative side, Mojo awarded the album only 2/5, arguing that "[t]he polished arrangements of Heretic Pride do Darnielle's songwriting no favours". Similarly, despite acknowledging that John Darnielle "is a monstrously talented guy," Slant Magazine criticises the album for going over old territory, arguing that Darnielle "has covered every last of these inches before," and that "[t]he lack of the sort of overarching theme that powered previous discography standouts Tallahassee and The Sunset Tree through their dull bits means that these moments rob the record of a lot of momentum and goodwill."

For the most part, however, the record was considered a very strong one. Reviewers such as Jessica Gentile at Crawdaddy gave credit not only to Darnielle but to his growing group of collaborators: "The album’s vast effectiveness is due in no small part to a team of extraordinary musicians; Heretic Pride is the Goats' most collaborative effort to date. Contributions by longtime bassist Peter Hughes, keyboardist Franklin Bruno, and cellist Erik Friedlander, not to mention the additions of Superchunk drummer John Wurster and guitarist Annie “St. Vincent” Clark, provide a tight-knit, full-bodied sound, serving to strengthen the already strong words they belie." Eric Sams focused more on Darnielle's unique songwriting prowess: "Even at his most abstract, his most obscure, his most manic, we always believe the words that John Darnielle is singing. This is the other half of the Mountain Goats’ singular mystique. No other human writing songs today channels so much ethos from his founding myths with such economic references. He wraps his words achingly tight around steely emotions and then punches us in the kidney with them until we believe them."

== Track listing ==
All tracks are written by John Darnielle.

No.	Title	Length
1.	"Sax Rohmer #1"	3:41
2.	"San Bernardino"	3:19
3.	"Heretic Pride"	3:43
4.	"Autoclave"	3:34
5.	"New Zion"	2:55
6.	"So Desperate"	3:21
7.	"In the Craters on the Moon"	3:32
8.	"Lovecraft in Brooklyn"	3:49
9.	"Tianchi Lake"	3:20
10.	"How to Embrace a Swamp Creature"	3:27
11.	"Marduk T-Shirt Men's Room Incident"	3:21
12.	"Sept. 15 1983"	3:43
13.	"Michael Myers Resplendent"	2:52
Total length:		44:37

iTunes bonus track
No.	Title	Length
14.	"Toolshed"	2:18
Total length:		46:55

Amazon bonus track
No.	Title	Length
14.	"Last Man on Earth"	3:56
Total length:		48:33

== Personnel ==
- John Darnielle – vocals, guitar
- Franklin Bruno – piano, organ
- Annie Clark – guitar, backing vocals
- Erik Friedlander – arrangement, strings
- Peter Hughes – electric guitar, bass guitar
- Jon Wurster – drums, percussion
- Rachel Ware Zooi – backing vocals
- Sarah Arslanian – backing vocals
- John Vanderslice – synthesizer, production
- Scott Solter – additional percussion, production, recording, mixing
- Aaron Prellwitz – recording
- Timin Murray – assistant recording
