= New Asian Cinema =

EP by the Mountain Goats
- Released: 1998
- Genre: Rock
- Length: 11:53
- Producer: Pat Maley and Brooks Martin

Professional ratings
Review scores
| Source | Rating |
|---|---|
| AllMusic | 4/5 stars |

New Asian Cinema is the first of three one-sided 12" records by the Mountain Goats on Olympia, WA's Yo Yo label. The B-side of the record includes etchings by Nikki McClure. It was produced by Pat Maley and Brooks Martin.

== Track listing ==
All tracks are written by John Darnielle.

| No. | Title | Length |
|---|---|---|
| 1. | "Cao Dai Blowout" | 2:05 |
| 2. | "Korean Bird Paintings" | 2:29 |
| 3. | "Narakaloka" | 2:18 |
| 4. | "Golden Jackal Song" | 3:00 |
| 5. | "Treetop Song" | 2:01 |
| Total length: | | 11:53 |
