= Devil House =

2022 novel by John Darnielle

- Author: John Darnielle
- Set in: Milpitas, California
- Publisher: MCD/Farrar, Straus and Giroux
- Publication date: January 25, 2022
- Publication place: United States
- Media type: Print (Hardcover / Paperback)
- ISBN: 9781250862884

Devil House is a 2022 novel by American singer-songwriter and author John Darnielle. It depicts true crime author Gage Chandler working on an unsolved double homicide committed in the Satanic Panic of the 1980s, further discussing the moral implications that arise as a result of working in the genre. Darnielle uses metafiction to tell Devil House's story. The novel is set largely in the California towns of Milpitas and San Luis Obispo, where Darnielle was raised.

The novel debuted on the New York Times Bestseller List on February 13 at #7, staying on the list for two weeks.

== Reviews ==
The New York Times called the book a "confident, creepy novel." NPR said, "Devil House is not a novel about karma or comeuppance. It is a portrait — sometimes direct, sometimes refracted — of a man realizing that his career, combined with his powerful imagination, has taken him far from his morals." In a starred review, Kirkus Reviews deemed it Darnielle's best novel to date.

Publishers Weekly named it one of the top ten books of fiction published in 2022.
