= Setlist.fm =

Wiki-type website listing concert song lists

- The Setlist.fm logo
- Website type: Website
- Available in: English
- Owner: Live Nation Entertainment
- Website: setlist.fm

Setlist.fm is a website that relies on crowdsourcing to publish lists of songs performed at concerts.

== Overview ==
The site has more than 9 million set lists compiled by thousands of volunteers. The lists, which cover performances from the 16th Century to the present, range from Wolfgang Amadeus Mozart to rock and pop artists such as Taylor Swift and Bruce Springsteen.

Bad Bunny set list example

The website enables users to see the length of shows and the most frequently played songs. For example, Taylor Swift's average show is more than three hours long, and her most frequently played song is "Love Story". Music journalists often use the site to analyze an artist's performances during a tour and predict what they will play at an upcoming concert. Some people reportedly use the lists to choose when to take bathroom breaks during a performance.

The site is owned by Live Nation Entertainment, a multinational entertainment company that promotes and sells tickets for entertainment events.

The use of set lists has been criticized for removing the spontaneity of live shows. Roger Daltrey, the lead vocalist of the English rock band the Who, told Billboard that the wide availability of the lists had "ruined" live shows for him. He later said in The New York Times that "the age of social media and the internet has changed the ability of any band" to provide fans with the unexpected. Before people were online, he said, "the power of word of mouth left people more room for imagination, and enjoyment."

Other artists say set lists help them keep track of their performances and make adjustments. John Darnielle, lead vocalist of American indie folk band the Mountain Goats, said he consults Setlist.fm almost every night when he is on tour to keep his solo portion of sets fresh.
