= Beat the Champ =

Studio album by the Mountain Goats
- Released: April 7, 2015
- Recorded: 2014
- Studios: Overdub Lane, Durham, North Carolina
- Genres: Indie rock; indie folk
- Length: 45:51
- Label: Merge
- Producers: Brandon Eggleston; Scott Solter

The Mountain Goats chronology
Transcendental Youth (2012)	Beat the Champ (2015)	Goths (2017)

Beat the Champ is the fifteenth studio album by the Mountain Goats, released on April 7, 2015, on Merge Records. The release is a concept album on professional wrestling, though frontman John Darnielle has stated that several of its songs are "really more about death and difficult-to-navigate interior spaces than wrestling."

It is the first album to feature multi-instrumentalist and current member Matt Douglas; as well as the first album since Heretic Pride to feature former member Erik Friedlander.

== Release ==
The album was announced by Merge on January 20, 2015, after which the second track, "The Legend of Chavo Guerrero", was released for streaming on the label's SoundCloud page. Shortly afterwards it became available for pre-order, where the large number of orders caused the site to crash. The song received praise from Guerrero as well his son Chavo Guerrero Jr., and Guerrero also appeared in a music video for the song alongside wrestlers Ray Rosas, Joey Ryan and Ryan Nemeth.

The second single, and sixth track of the album, titled "Heel Turn 2" was released on Merge Records' SoundCloud page on February 28, 2015. The following day, it officially premiered on an episode of the podcast Welcome to Night Vale.

The album was released in Australia and New Zealand on April 3, 2015, on Merge Records and distributed by Remote Control Records, in the United States and Canada on April 7, 2015, on Merge Records, and in Europe on April 13, 2015, on Merge Records.

== Critical reception ==
Professional ratings
Aggregate scores
Source	Rating
Metacritic	79/100
Review scores
Source	Rating
Rolling Stone Australia	4.5/5 stars
Alternative Press	7.5/10 stars
The A.V. Club	B
Consequence of Sound	B
Pitchfork	6.6/10
Los Angeles Times	3.5/4 stars
Paste	7.5/10

Beat the Champ received largely positive reviews from contemporary music critics. At Metacritic, which assigns a normalized rating out of 100 to reviews from mainstream critics, the album received an average score of 79, based on 24 reviews, which indicates "generally favorable reviews".

Several critics praised Beat the Champ for providing an accessible interpretation of professional wrestling, such that listeners not interested in the sport could still enjoy the album. Writing for Exclaim!, Jer Fairall called the record "yet another highlight in a career overflowing with them", in large part due to the group's "sonic adventurousness, matched with Darnielle's singular presence as a storyteller and a songwriter."

== Track listing ==
All tracks are written by John Darnielle.

No.	Title	Length
1.	"Southwestern Territory"	4:14
2.	"The Legend of Chavo Guerrero"	3:00
3.	"Foreign Object"	2:51
4.	"Animal Mask"	2:54
5.	"Choked Out"	1:42
6.	"Heel Turn 2"	5:58
7.	"Fire Editorial"	3:22
8.	"Stabbed to Death Outside San Juan"	3:48
9.	"Werewolf Gimmick"	2:34
10.	"Luna"	3:27
11.	"Unmasked!"	3:28
12.	"The Ballad of Bull Ramos"	2:53
13.	"Hair Match"	5:40
Total length:		45:51

Deluxe edition bonus 12"
No.	Title	Length
14.	"Blood Capsules"	3:25
15.	"Dub Capsules"	4:05
Total length:		53:21

== Personnel ==
- John Darnielle – acoustic guitar, vocals, piano, keyboards, lyrics, composition
- Peter Hughes – bass, electric guitar
- Jon Wurster – drums, percussion
- Brad Cook – vocals (background)
- Phil Cook – organ, vocals (background)
- Matt Douglas – woodwind, woodwind arrangement
- Erik Friedlander – strings, string arrangement
- Nathan Golub – steel guitar
- Austin Nevins – guitar
- Rob Carmichael – graphic design, typography
- Leela Corman – cover illustration, additional illustrations
- Brandon Eggleston – producer
- Brent Lambert – mastering
- Scott Solter – additional production, mixing
