= Killer Kowalski Memorial Show =

Walter "Killer" Kowalski Memorial Show
- Promotion(s): Big Time Wrestling; United States Wrestling Federation
- Date: October 26, 2008
- City: Malden, Massachusetts, United States
- Attendance: 400 (est.)

The Walter "Killer" Kowalski Memorial Show was a professional wrestling memorial event co-produced by the Big Time Wrestling (BTW) and United States Wrestling Federation (USWF) promotions, which took place on October 26, 2008, at the Irish American Club in Malden, Massachusetts. The event was held in honor of Walter "Killer" Kowalski, who had died August 30, 2008, a little over three weeks after suffering a heart attack on August 8, 2008. All proceeds from the show were donated to the Walter "Killer" Kowalski Memorial Fund" to help pay for his medical bills; A wrestling memorabilia raffle was another attraction, and which included gift baskets (some filled with WWE t-shirts and DVDs), a broken autographed guitar by The Honky Tonk Man, and autographed Killer Kowalski action figures and photographs donated from wrestlers all over the world. Fans were also able to bid on memorabilia from Kowalski's wrestling career including an original pair of wrestling tights, boots and his mask. In all, over $7,000 was raised.

== Attendees ==
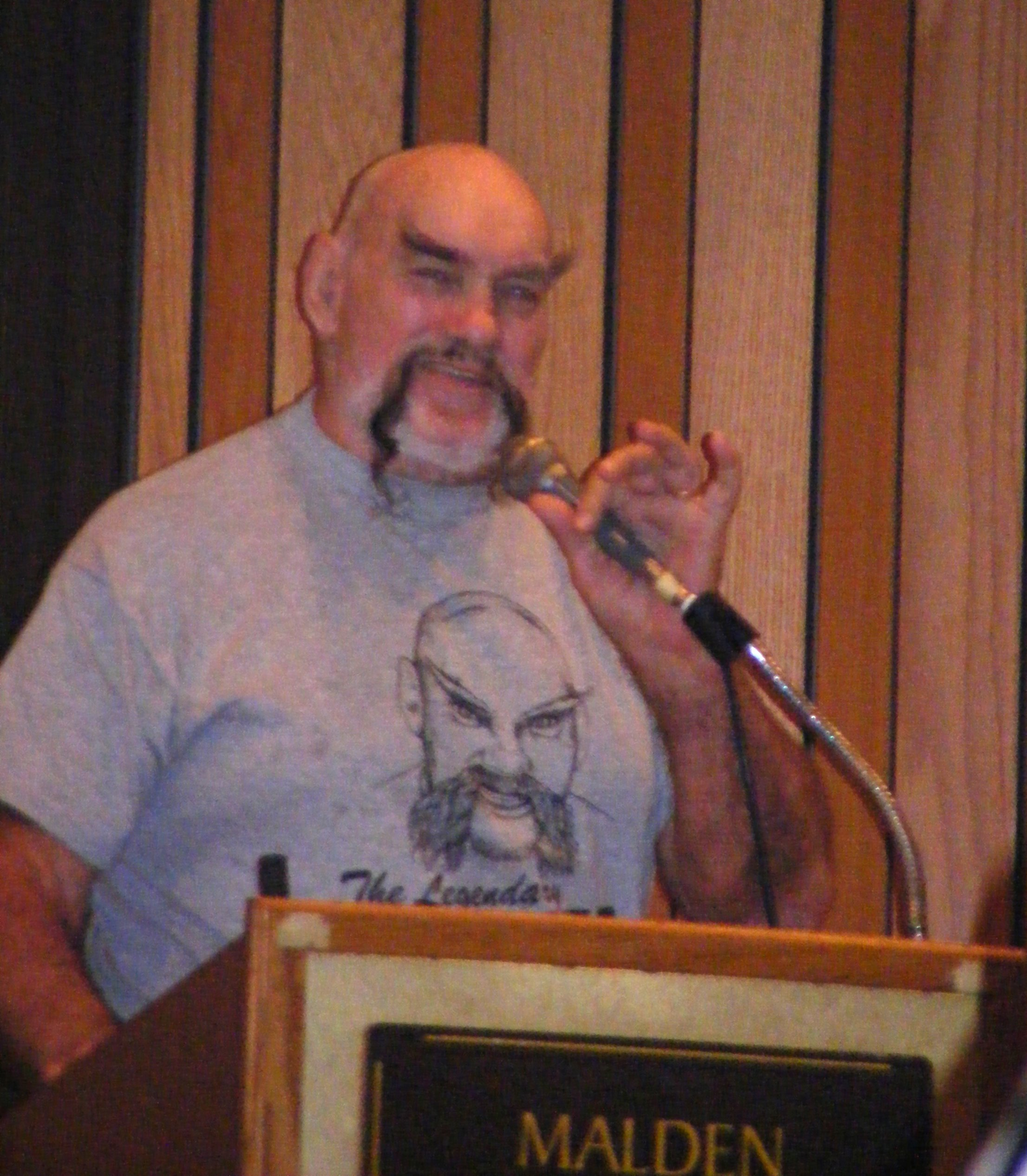
Ox Baker speaks at the Killer Kowalski Memorial Show in October 2008.

Among those in attendance included Richard Byrne, J. J. Dillon and Kowalski's former tag team partner Ox Baker, who each delivered speeches during the 30-minute opening ceremony, as was Walter's widow Theresa who performed a song entitled "When Polish Hearts Are Smiling" (sung to the tune of the Irish folksong When Irish Eyes Are Smiling). Also scheduled to appear were Nikolai Volkoff and Tito Santana, however, both were later forced to cancel at the last minute with Santana suffering from strep throat. A number of wrestlers from Total Nonstop Action Wrestling and World Wrestling Entertainment, as well from the Northeastern independent circuit, were also present at the event to pay their respects as many of the attendees were either taught or mentored by Kowalski at some point in their career. A few wrestlers who had wanted to be at the show, most notably Hunter Hearst Helmsley, were unable to do so due to WWE holding a pay-per-view, Cyber Sunday, in Phoenix, Arizona that same night. Eight professional wrestling matches were featured on the event's card, with three including championships.

== Main event ==
The main event was a twenty-person battle royal, including two female wrestlers, which was won by Tubby Muffin after eliminating Ron Zombie. There were two other two-semi main events. The first was a standard wrestling match for the BTW Heavyweight Championship between the champion, R. J. Brewer, accompanied by manager Johnny Fabulous, and the challenger, Aaron Stevens, in which Stevens won the championship due to outside interference by Frankie Kazarian, and the second, a match between Justin Credible and Spike Dudley. Another featured match was Jack Maverik and AJ Mtrino, managed by J. J. Dillon, against Eric Ego and Tony Delfonzo, which Maverik and Mtrino won. Doink the Clown defeated Mr. TA, Tre Smooth successfully defended the BTW Gangsta Championship against Jimmy Jact Cash, and Dukes Dalton and Mike Hallow defeated The French Connection (Antoine Roy and Roberto Rush) to win the BTW Tag Team Championship.

== Results ==
October 26, 2008 in Malden, Massachusetts (Irish American Club)
No.	Results	Stipulations
1	Luis Ortiz defeated Malice Mason and Benny Jux	Three-Way Dance
2	Jack Maverik and AJ Mtrino (with J. J. Dillon) defeated Eric Ego and Tony Delfonzo	Tag Team match
3	Tre Smooth (c) defeated Jimmy Jact Cash	Singles match for the BTW Gangsta Championship
4	Dukes Dalton and Mike Hallow defeated The French Connection (Antoine Roy and Roberto Rush) (c) (with "The Poroxide Princess" Felicia Lou)	Tag Team match for the BTW Tag Team Championship
5	Doink the Clown defeated Mr. TA	Singles match
6	Spike Dudley defeated Justin Credible	Singles match
7	Aaron Stevens defeated R. J. Brewer (c) (with Johnny Fabulous)	Singles match for the BTW Heavyweight Championship
8	Tubby Muffin defeated 19 other participants by last eliminating Ron Zombie (Note: A partial list of the other participants included were: Benny Jux, AJ Mtrino, Eric Egoh, Tony Delfonzo, Louie the Pizza Guy, Wolfman Branford, Zachery Springate III, Slyck Wagner Brown, Freight Train, and Luis "Demon" Ortiz.)	Twenty-man battle royal
(c) / – the champion(s) heading into the match
