= List of cassette releases by Mountain Goats =

The Mountain Goats discography includes a number of cassette-only releases from the 1990s, starting with Taboo VI: The Homecoming, the band's first release in 1991. The following is a list of cassette-only releases by the band.

== Taboo VI: The Homecoming ==
Taboo VI: The Homecoming

EP by the Mountain Goats
- Released: 1991
- Recorded: California, 1991
- Genre: Lo-fi
- Length: 24:50
- Label: Shrimper
- Producer: John Darnielle

The Mountain Goats chronology
Taboo VI: The Homecoming (1991)	The Hound Chronicles (1992)

While working as a psychiatric nurse in Southern California, the Mountain Goats frontman John Darnielle purchased a Panasonic boom box from Circuit City and began writing and recording, as well as playing small venues. After completing the album, Darnielle dispersed Taboo VI to his friends; one of which ended up in the hands of Dennis Callaci. It was then released by Callaci under his label Shrimper in 1992. Darnielle had no idea anyone except his friends would hear Taboo VI: The Homecoming.

John Darnielle had this to say of the cassette:

"When I wrote and recorded Taboo VI, I had no idea that anyone outside of a few friends would ever hear it; neither did I hope that anyone outside of those friends would ever express any interest in it. A couple of the things on it (Going to Alaska, Eleven Bands, Solomon Revisited, the Hank Williams song) are things I'd stand by if pressed, though I wish I'd've known how to sing better back when they were recorded. While I completely understand the collector's urge, I would offer the following caveat to anyone trying to hunt down Taboo VI: it's not what you think it is. Its successor, the Hound Chronicles, represented an abrupt and total change in direction, and is the stylistic starting point for all that followed. While I can't and wouldn't disown Taboo VI, I'd like to offer this note of caution to those who like the later stuff and are trying to get their hands on my first efforts: you probably won't like it much, and if you pay an inflated price for it, you'll probably feel cheated. Having said that, if you still feel inclined to hunt it down, I do hope that you enjoy it on its own meager terms. It means well and didn't want to hurt anyone. Except for maybe that one guy. I hate that guy."

All tracks are written by John Darnielle, except where noted.

Side one
No.	Title	Length
1.	"Running Away With what Freud Said"	1:35
2.	"Ice Cream, Cobra Man""	1:36
3.	"Move (Chicago 196X)"	3:59
4.	"This Magic Moment" (The Drifters)	2:42
5.	"Don't Take the Dogs Away"	2:17

Side two
No.	Title	Length
1.	"One Winter at Point Alpha Privative"	1:25
2.	"Solomon Revisited"	4:06
3.	"Going to Alaska"	2:33
4.	"I'm So Lonesome I Could Cry" (Hank Williams, Sr.)	2:43
5.	"Eleven Bands" (The Congress)	2:01

Track listing.

== The Hound Chronicles ==
The Hound Chronicles

EP by the Mountain Goats
- Released: 1992
- Recorded: 1992
- Genre: Lo-fi
- Length: 41:27
- Label: Shrimper Records
- Producer: John Darnielle

The Mountain Goats chronology
Taboo VI: The Homecoming (1991)	The Hound Chronicles (1992)	Transmissions to Horace (1993)

The Hound Chronicles is the second cassette-only release of the Mountain Goats, released in 1992 on the Shrimper Records label. All songs are written by John Darnielle, except "Keep It on Your Mind" by Hank Williams. It was reissued on CD and as a digital download alongside Hot Garden Stomp on July 26, 2012. The song "Going to Kansas" was re-recorded for their 1996 album Nothing for Juice.

All tracks are written by John Darnielle, except where noted.

Side one
No.	Title	Length
1.	"The Garden Song"	2:13
2.	"Going to Wisconsin"	2:26
3.	"Spilling Toward Alpha"	2:31
4.	"Alpha Negative"	1:55
5.	"Torch Song"	1:30
6.	"שקט (Be Quiet)"	3:00
7.	"The Cow Song"	3:08
8.	"(Untitled)"	0:18
9.	"Going to Chino"	4:30

Side two
No.	Title	Length
1.	"(Intro)"	0:19
2.	"Standard Bitter Love Song No. 4"	2:07
3.	"Going to Mexico"	1:52
4.	"Lab Rat Blues"	1:57
5.	"Going to Kansas"	4:39
6.	"The Water Song"	2:28
7.	"Going to Spain"	1:57
8.	"Keep It on Your Mind" (Hank Williams, Sr.)	2:15

== Transmissions to Horace ==
Transmissions to Horace

EP by the Mountain Goats
- Released: 1993
- Genres: Lo-fi, Rock
- Label: Sonic Enemy
- Producer: John Darnielle

The Mountain Goats chronology
The Hound Chronicles (1992)	Transmissions to Horace (1993)	Hot Garden Stomp (1993)

Transmissions to Horace is the third cassette-only release by The Mountain Goats, released in 1993. Each tape features a different cover. The cassette in its entirety appeared in 1999 as part of Bitter Melon Farm, which was re-released in 2002.

In 2013, it was revealed that additional songs were included in certain copies of the cassette. These songs are early recordings by The Extra Glenns, John Darnielle's other band, some of which possibly predate the recordings of Taboo VI: The Homecoming.

All tracks are written by John Darnielle, except where noted.

Side one
No.	Title	Length
1.	"Going to Cleveland"	3:07
2.	"Early Spring"	2:20
3.	"Historiography"	2:52
4.	"No, I Can't"	3:22
5.	"Alpha Desperation March"	2:31
6.	"Going to Monaco"	2:59

Side two
No.	Title	Length
1.	"Star Dusting"	2:10
2.	"Teenage World"	2:23
3.	"Going to Santiago"	2:27
4.	"Sail On" (The Commodores)	2:51

Extra tracks
No.	Title	Length
1.	"Sure" (Later released on Sidereal Rest)	3:13
2.	"Greasepaint Friday" (Unreleased)	2:19
3.	"The Moon" (Unreleased)	2:12
4.	"(Unknown title)" (Unreleased)	4:56
5.	"Bird on the Wire" (Leonard Cohen cover; live performance)	3:25
6.	"Infidelity" (Live performance; later released on Infidelity EP)	2:40
7.	"Rockin' Rockin' Twilight of the Gods" (Live performance; later released on Undercard)	4:29

== Hot Garden Stomp ==
Hot Garden Stomp

EP by the Mountain Goats
- Released: 1993
- Recorded: 1993
- Genre: Lo-fi
- Length: 36:46
- Label: Shrimper
- Producer: John Darnielle

The Mountain Goats chronology
Transmissions to Horace (1993)	Hot Garden Stomp (1993)	Taking the Dative (1994)

Hot Garden Stomp is a 1993 cassette-only release by The Mountain Goats. All songs by John Darnielle except "Tell Me on a Sunday", written by Andrew Lloyd Webber. It was reissued on CD and as a digital download alongside The Hound Chronicles on July 26, 2012.

All tracks are written by John Darnielle, except where noted.

Side one
No.	Title	Length
1.	"Pure Milk"	2:18
2.	"Ice Blue"	1:48
3.	"Water Song II"	2:20
4.	"Sun Song"	1:52
5.	"Going to Japan"	2:18
6.	"Are You Cleaning Off the Stone?"	2:00
7.	"The Hot Garden Stomp"	2:47
8.	"Love Hymn to Aphrodite"	1:36

Side two
No.	Title	Length
1.	"Beach House"	2:18
2.	"Hello There Howard"	2:33
3.	"Going to Norwalk"	2:12
4.	"Fresh Cherries in Trinidad"	1:52
5.	"Feed This End"	3:23
6.	"15-1"	2:00
7.	"Thanks for the Dress"	2:13
8.	"Tell Me on a Sunday" (Andrew Lloyd Webber)	3:16

== Taking the Dative ==
Taking the Dative

EP by the Mountain Goats
- Released: 1994
- Genres: Lo-fi, Folk
- Label: Car in Car Disco
- Producer: John Darnielle

The Mountain Goats chronology
Hot Garden Stomp (1993)	Taking the Dative (1994)	Yam, the King of Crops (1994)

Taking The Dative is the fifth cassette-only release by The Mountain Goats, released by Car in Car Disco Records in 1994. The cassette in its entirety appeared on their compilation Ghana, which was released in 1999. According to John Darnielle, there is a bonus track on as few as one copy of the cassette, titled "8 to 20 on a Weapons Charge".

All tracks are written by John Darnielle.

Side one
No.	Title	Length
1.	"Orange Ball of Peace"	1:25
2.	"Standard Bitter Love Song No. 8"	1:45
3.	"Chino Love Song 1979"	2:12

Side two
No.	Title	Length
1.	"Wrong!"	2:18
2.	"Going To Jamaica"	2:18
3.	"Alpha Gelida"	1:52

== Yam, the King of Crops ==
Yam, the King of Crops

EP by the Mountain Goats
- Released: 1994
- Genres: Lo-fi, Rock
- Label: Oska Records
- Producer: John Darnielle

The Mountain Goats chronology
Taking the Dative (1994)	Yam, the King of Crops (1994)	Zopilote Machine (1994)

Yam, the King of Crops is the sixth cassette-only release by the Mountain Goats, released in 1994. It was the last cassette released by the band until 2011, when they released All Survivors Pack as a preorder bonus for All Eternals Deck. It appears in its entirety on the Protein Source of the Future...Now! compilation CD.

The title and lyrics of the song "Two Thousand Seasons" come from the 1973 novel by Ghanaian writer Ayi Kwei Armah.

All tracks are written by John Darnielle, except where noted.

Side one
No.	Title	Length
1.	"Seed Song"	2:16
2.	"Quetzalcoatl Comes Through"	1:59
3.	"Omega Blaster"	2:06
4.	"Coco-Yam Song"	1:53

Side two
No.	Title	Length
1.	"Alagemo"	2:23
2.	"Two Thousand Seasons"	1:40
3.	"Chinese Rifle Song"	1:55
4.	"Yam, the King of Crops"	2:00
