= Moon Colony Bloodbath =

EP by the Mountain Goats and John Vanderslice
- Released: 2009
- Studios: Tiny Telephone (San Francisco), et al.
- Genres: Rock, folk rock
- Length: 18:55
- Label: Cadmean Dawn
- Producer: Chris Stamey

Moon Colony Bloodbath is an EP released by the Mountain Goats and John Vanderslice while on tour in 2009. It was recorded by John Darnielle and John Vanderslice, with a cover art collage by Michael Pajon. John Darnielle had this to say about its status as a concept album:

"Some of the songs have something to do with a loose rock opera/'concept album' idea about organ harvesting colonies on the moon and the employees thereof, who spent their off months living in secluded opulence in remote American locations. Concepts like this are actually more fun when you abandon them but leave their traces kicking around, so that’s what we did.”

Bobby Beausoleil, who is serving a life sentence for murder and has association with the Manson Family, is the subject of lyrics on the track "Scorpio Rising". Bobby Beausoleil was also to be the star of the movie Lucifer Rising, the title of another song on the record.

The EP was initially produced in a limited vinyl run of 1,000 and sold during their "Gone Primitive" tour. In late May 2024, it was announced that a remaster had been completed by Bob Weston, which was released digitally on Bandcamp on the 31st. Additionally, a vinyl repress run of 2,000 was released the same day.

== Track listing ==
All tracks are written by John Darnielle and John Vanderslice.

Side A
No.	Title	Length
1.	"Surrounded"	2:21
2.	"Lucifer Rising"	2:48
3.	"Satori In Denver"	2:35

Side B
No.	Title	Length
1.	"Scorpio Rising"	2:30
2.	"Sudden Oak Death"	3:16
3.	"Columns Pillars Steps"	2:31
4.	"Emerging"	2:54

== Reception ==
Science fiction blog io9 listed Moon Colony Bloodbath as #88 in their list "100 Albums Every Science Fiction and Fantasy Fan Should Listen To."

According to io9's Charlie Anders, Moon Colony Bloodbath is "well worth tracking down. It starts with a gorgeously melancholy song with the lyric 'Let me die surrounded by machines,' and ends with the singer left alive after the Satanic massacre on the Moon, wearing a suit that keeps him warm but starving. Totally intense, and as bleak as the Moon itself."

== Personnel ==
- John Darnielle – acoustic guitar, vocals, keyboard, harmonica, glockenspiel, lyrics, composition
- John Vanderslice – acoustic guitar, vocals, keyboard, mandolin, lyrics, composition
- Chris Stamey – electric bass guitar, acoustic bass guitar, cello, keyboard, production
- Michael Pajon – cover artwork
