= Wolf in White Van =

2014 debut novel by John Darnielle

- Author: John Darnielle
- Language: English
- Genre: Novel
- Publisher: Farrar, Straus and Giroux
- Publication date: 2014
- Publication place: United States
- Pages: 224
- ISBN: 978-0374292089

Wolf in White Van is the first novel by the American author and singer-songwriter John Darnielle. Wolf in White Van tells the story of Sean Phillips, a reclusive game designer whose face has been severely disfigured. One reviewer characterizes Sean as someone "steeped in video games, bad sci-fi movies, and Conan the Barbarian comic books". The plot, which is told non-chronologically, alternates among Sean's childhood, adolescence, and adulthood to describe the circumstances surrounding the incident that disfigured him. A fictional play-by-mail role-playing game called Trace Italian figures prominently in the novel.

The novel has been described as a "meditation on the power of escape," exploring the escapist qualities of fantasy fiction and role-playing games, particularly as a way to cope with trauma. Wolf in White Van received positive reviews on release and was nominated for the 2014 National Book Award.

== Background and creation ==
The title Wolf in White Van is a reference to the practice of backmasking, as the phrase "wolf in white van" can allegedly be heard when the Larry Norman song "Six, Sixty, Six" is played in reverse.

Darnielle started work on the novel the day after completing his previous book, Master of Reality. "I'd been working on it so long that it felt weird not to be working on anything, so I started typing something up, and it was what became the last chapter of Wolf in White Van. I just started typing it up and it ended with a guy shooting himself and I said, 'Well, that’s not a good story.' So then I wrote a bunch of other chapters with no direction at all," he said.

== Plot summary ==
Sean Phillips lives with a caretaker after shooting himself in the head at age 17, causing facial disfigurement. The circumstances of the shooting are initially left ambiguous. Sean's relationship with his parents is strained as they struggle to understand why he chose to shoot himself. The novel alternates between different moments in Sean's life. He describes the reactions people have to his appearance, and the experience he has meeting people before and after the shooting. One of his friends, Kimmy, visits him in the hospital, but she is discouraged by Sean's parents who believe she convinced Sean to shoot himself.

While recuperating in the hospital, Sean develops the play-by-mail role-playing game Trace Italian, from which he earns a small income. The objective of Trace Italian is to traverse a post-apocalyptic United States and locate a fortress after which the game is named—a fortress that Sean claims no player will ever penetrate. Sean describes the correspondence he has with players, in particular two teenage players who attempt to carry out the game's actions in real life. One dies and the other is injured, and Sean is sued in court by the players' parents but the case is dismissed.

The novel ends with Sean recalling a time before the shooting when he sneaked out with Kimmy and they kissed behind a store. That same night, Sean takes out a rifle and considers whether to shoot himself as well as his parents. He decides not to shoot his parents, then enters his room, rests the rifle against under his chin and lies on his stomach. The sentence ends with an excerpt from a fantasy.

The narrative is told in a non-chronological order, with the current life of the narrator interrupted with frequent flashbacks, in a reverse chronological order.
