= Blood Circus (film) =

1985 science fiction-horror film

- Promotional "scream bag" produced for film
- Directed by: Santo Victor Rigatuso (as Bob Harris): John Corso; Joseph Ryan Zwick
- Starring: Victor Santo Rigatuso: Ox Baker; Jon Harris (III); Vinnie Valentino
- Cinematography: John Corso
- Production company: Santo Productions
- Release date: 1985
- Country: United States

Blood Circus (also known as Blood Circus Wrestling) is a 1985 independent American science fiction-horror film in which aliens take part in professional wrestling matches on Earth. It was produced by Baltimore-native Santo Victor Rigatuso, also called Robert "Bob" Harris, who promoted it through infomercials for his mail-order "Santo Gold" jewelry business. Though it had a brief regional release funded by Rigatuso, the film never received distribution.

== Premise ==
Aliens from the planet Zoran are sent to Earth to fight against professional wrestlers from the United States and the Soviet Union, but prove to actually to devour their opponents upon defeating them.

== Cast ==
- Santo Victor Rigatuso as Santo Gold
- John Harris (III)
- Jerry Reese (as Voodoo Malumba)
- Vinnie Valentino

== Production ==
Filming for Blood Circus began in 1985 on a purported budget of $2 million, largely financed by Rigatuso's Credit Card Authorization Center business. This business offered customers with bad credit histories the opportunity to purchase a fake credit card for $50, with which they could only purchase exclusive "Santo Gold" jewelry (Rigatuso would later serve ten months in prison in 1989 for mail fraud in relationship to the enterprise).

One of the key moments in Blood Circus was filmed at the Baltimore Civic Center, where Rigatuso, playing a character called Santo Gold, performs a song before the climactic wrestling match. The song lyrics have nothing to do with the film; instead, the song promotes Rigatuso's "Santo Gold" jewelry. Extras were paid $10 each to sit in arena and observe the action. Some of the "Earth wrestlers" were actual professional wrestlers from the San Antonio-based Southwest Championship Wrestling promotion, including Douglas “Ox” Baker, an experienced actor in his own right, Vinnie Valentino, and Eric Embry.

On June 5, 1985, it was reported in The Arizona Republic that Rigatuso was planning to release a 30-minute documentary on the production and an album to promote the film.

== Release ==
After spending two years editing the film, Rigatuso could not find a distributor for the Blood Circus; he ended up renting several theaters in the Baltimore area to show his film. It was shown for only a week, and took in far less than it cost to produce. The film was never shown to the public after it ended its initial run, and the original copy was believed to have been lost. Clips of Blood Circus can still be seen in portions of "Santo Gold" infomercials circulating on the Internet.

"Scream bags" were also provided to moviegoers as a promotional tie-in. The bags had a long poem about Blood Circus on each side, as well as a coupon for a free diamond ring from Rigatuso's "Santo Gold" infomercials.

In 2008, Santo Gold claimed that the 35mm negatives of Blood Circus had at last been found, and that producers were being sought for its release.
