= Babylon Springs EP =

Babylon Springs

EP by the Mountain Goats
- Released: 2006
- Genre: Rock
- Label: 4AD

Professional ratings
Review scores
Source	Rating
Stylus	C+

Babylon Springs is a 2006 EP by the Mountain Goats on the 4AD label. It was released as a CD and a digital download.

== Track listing ==
All tracks are written by John Darnielle, except where noted.

No.	Title	Length
1.	"Ox Baker Triumphant"	2:40
2.	"Alibi"	3:43
3.	"Sail Babylon Springs"	3:13
4.	"Sometimes I Still Feel The Bruise" (Trembling Blue Stars)	4:44
5.	"Wait For You"	3:14
Total length:		17:34

== Charts ==
Chart performance for Babylon Springs
Chart (2006)	Peak position
Australia (ARIA)	86
