= Orange Raja, Blood Royal =

EP by the Mountain Goats & Alastair Galbraith
- Released: 1995
- Genre: Lo-fi
- Label: Walt Records

Orange Raja, Blood Royal is a 7" record by the Mountain Goats and Alastair Galbraith on the Walt Records label. The back cover of the sleeve features two quotations. The first is from Fear and Trembling by Søren Kierkegaard: "Fools and young men prate about everything being possible for a man. That, however, is a great error. Speaking spiritually, everything is possible, but in the world of the finite there is much that is not possible." The second quotation is from Seneca the Younger's tragedy Thyestes: "Credite mihi, amate poenas." ("Believe me, and love your punishments")

== Track listing ==
Side one:

1. "Blood Royal"
2. "The Only Thing I Know"
3. "Raja Vocative"
4. "Hatha Hill"
