= Scott Solter =

American record producer

Scott Solter is an American recording engineer, record producer, mixer, remixer and musician. As a producer and mixer, Solter has worked with numerous indie rock artists, including Maps & Atlases, St. Vincent, Spoon, Sarah Jaffe, Becca Stevens, John Vanderslice, Superchunk, Okkervil River, The Mountain Goats, Erik Friedlander, Pattern is Movement, Two Gallants, Boxharp, Lost in the Trees, Bombadil, The Forms, Broken Arm Trio, Michael Zapruder, The Caribbean, Centro-matic, Division Day, Alex Turnquist, Liam Singer, The Court and Spark, Charles Atlas, Tarental, Mike Patton, Derek Piotr, Fred Frith, and Zeena Parkins.

Solter has released two solo albums — The Brief Light, One River — remixed numerous works of other artists, and is a member of The Balustrade Ensemble and Boxharp.
