= John Darnielle =

American singer-songwriter

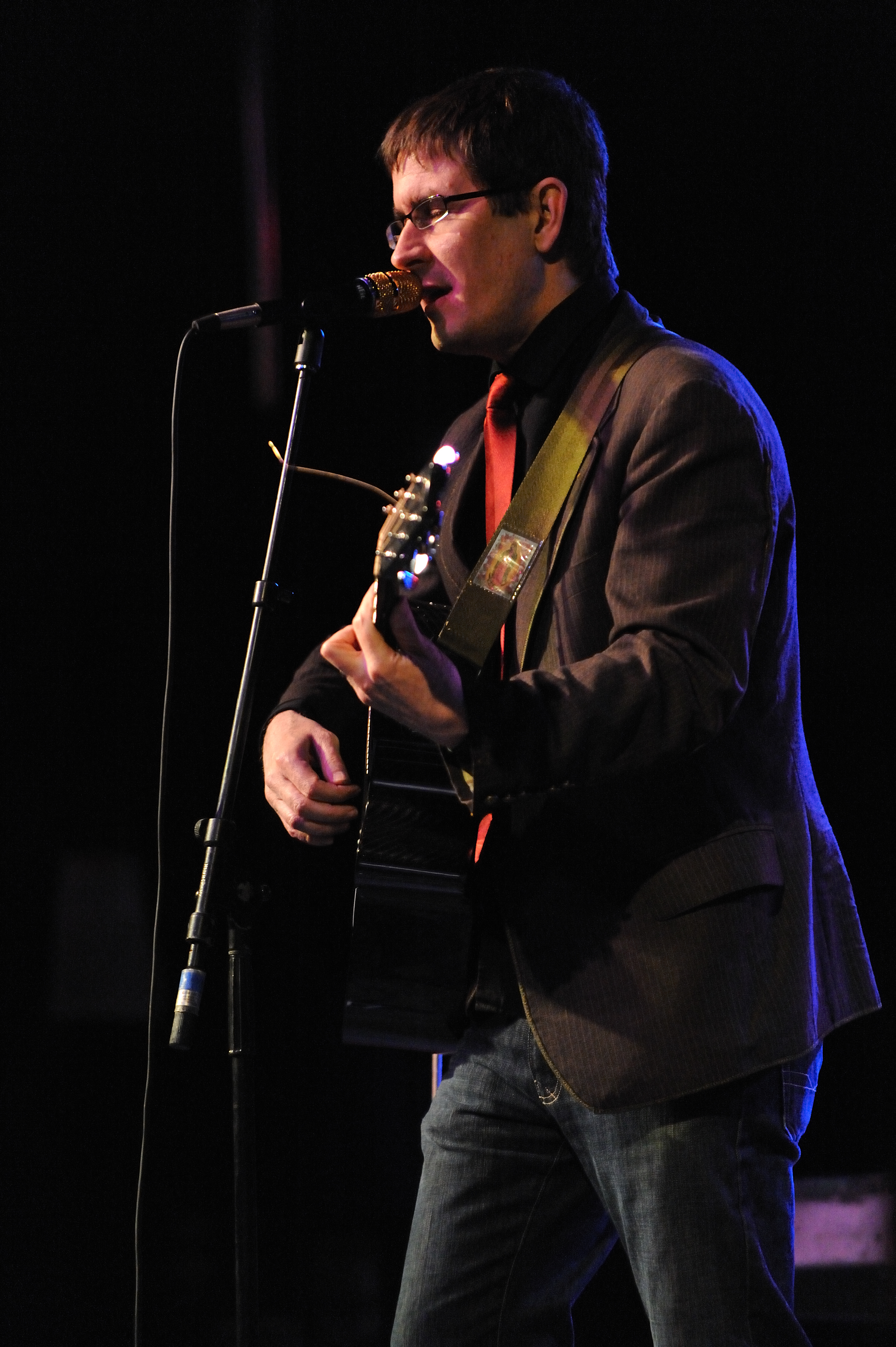
- Darnielle playing in St. Augustine, Florida, in 2010.

Background information
- Born: March 16, 1967 (age 59); Bloomington, Indiana
- Genres: Indie folk; indie rock; folk rock; lo-fi; folk
- Occupations: Singer-songwriter; musician; novelist
- Instruments: Vocals; guitar; piano
- Years active: 1991–present
- Member of: The Mountain Goats
- Formerly of: The Bloody Hawaiians; The Congress; The Extra Lens; The Seneca Twins

John Darnielle (/dɑːrˈniːl/; born March 16, 1967) is an American musician and novelist best known as the primary, and originally sole, member of the American indie folk band the Mountain Goats, for which he is the writer, composer, guitarist, pianist, and vocalist. Since starting the band in 1991, he has gained a cult following and is known for his prolific output and literary lyrics. He has written three novels: Wolf in White Van (2014), Universal Harvester (2017), and Devil House (2022).

== Early life ==
Born in Bloomington, Indiana, Darnielle grew up in San Luis Obispo and then Claremont, California with an abusive stepfather. The Mountain Goats' 2005 album The Sunset Tree is dedicated to his stepfather and frequently references the dysfunction of his upbringing.

Darnielle often attended professional wrestling matches with his stepfather at the Grand Olympic Auditorium. There, he developed a passion for the sport and local wrestlers like Chavo Guerrero Sr. His childhood love of wrestling would go on to inspire the Mountain Goats' album Beat the Champ.

Darnielle attended Claremont High School, located in the Pomona Valley region of Southern California. For a short time after high school, he lived in Portland, Oregon, where he developed an addiction to intravenous methamphetamine and other hard drugs (as referenced in We Shall All Be Healed). Darnielle worked as a psychiatric nurse at the Metropolitan State Hospital in Norwalk, California. Darnielle attended Pitzer College from 1991 to 1995, graduating as a double major in Classics and English.

Throughout his college education, he continued to record music. In 1992, Dennis Callaci, a friend of Darnielle's and owner of Shrimper Records, released a tape of Darnielle's songs called Taboo VI: The Homecoming. Around that time, the Mountain Goats were born and began touring with just Darnielle on guitar and a bassist, first Rachel Ware and then Peter Hughes.

== Musical career ==
Darnielle is best known for his role in the band the Mountain Goats. Since starting the band in 1991, he has gained a cult following. Despite being dubbed a low fidelity artist, Darnielle has always dubbed his work "bi-fi", pointing out that recordings such as his couldn't be made without modern technology. He is known for his prolific output and literary lyrics. Sasha Frere-Jones, writing in The New Yorker, referred to him as "America's best non-hip-hop lyricist". In its June 2006 issue, Paste magazine named Darnielle one of the "100 Best Living Songwriters".

Darnielle has several series of songs with similar titles or storylines. A series entitled "Going To..." features small stories about various places and includes songs such as "Going to Cleveland", "Going to Maryland", "Going to Georgia", and "Going to Queens". This series explores the futility of running away from one's problems in stark and cryptic detail. There is no reoccurring main character or strong thematic subject linking these similarly titled tracks, and in a 1997 interview with KJHK-Lawrence, Darnielle has described the series as "real loose, though. it's real loose". His "Alpha" series predates his musical career and began as a collection of poems called 'Songs from Point Alpha Privative'. It is about a distressed couple's marriage and history, with such song titles as "Alpha Incipiens", "Alphabetizing", and "Alpha Rats Nest". The band's 2002 album Tallahassee was exclusively about the couple. "Their broader story", Darnielle writes, "involved an alcohol-soaked trek from California through Nevada and then bottom-crawling across the country until they wound up in northern Florida". Unless otherwise specified in the lyrics, the songs are intended to be sung by either member of the couple. There are a number of songs, not all containing the word 'alpha', that are generally considered to be part of the series, and are explored in more detail on Kyle Barbour's site 'The Annotated Mountain Goats'.

Darnielle has stated that all songs written up to and including those on Tallahassee are fictional, but that We Shall All Be Healed, The Sunset Tree, and other more recent works are partially autobiographical. He told The New York Times that he consults Setlist.fm most nights to keep his live shows fresh.

=== Collaborations ===
Darnielle is featured on Aesop Rock's song "Coffee" (from the hip-hop artist's 2007 album None Shall Pass) and appears in the corresponding music video. Additionally, Aesop Rock remixed the Mountain Goats' "Lovecraft in Brooklyn".

He collaborated with John Vanderslice on lyrics for the 2005 album Pixel Revolt, and in 2009, Darnielle released a collaborative recording titled Moon Colony Bloodbath, after a shared tour with Vanderslice. They toured under the collective name The Comedians, though their recording is attributed to "the Mountain Goats and John Vanderslice".

With Franklin Bruno, Darnielle formed The Extra Lens, originally named The Extra Glenns. They have released two albums: 2002's Martial Arts Weekend and 2010's Undercard.

In 2008, Darnielle collaborated with Kaki King on a six-track EP entitled Black Pear Tree. The project was jointly released under King's name, and the Mountain Goats moniker. The Mountain Goats and Kaki King subsequently embarked on a co-headlining tour, billed as the Last Happy Night of Your Life Tour, with the EP being sold as a tour-exclusive release throughout.

On September 20, 2010, Darnielle appeared on Late Night with Jimmy Fallon as a guest vocalist in a performance of the song "Digging for Something" with the band Superchunk (whose drummer, Jon Wurster, is also in the Mountain Goats).

Darnielle appeared on Kimya Dawson's 2011 album Thunder Thighs, featured on the song "Walk Like Thunder."

Lin Manuel Miranda sang on four songs from The Mountain Goats' 2025 album, Through This Fire Across from Peter Balkan.

== Writing ==
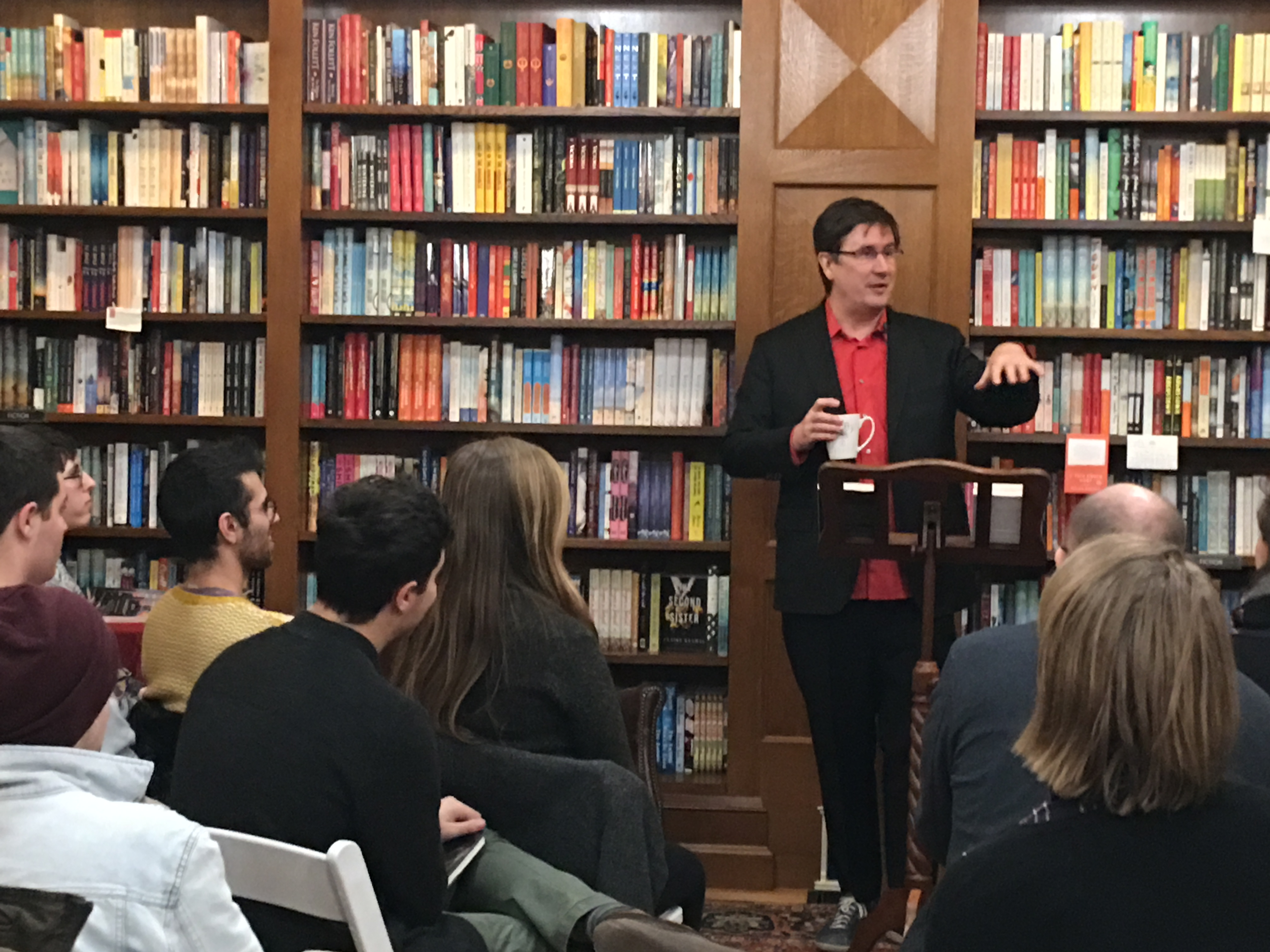
Darnielle giving a reading from Universal Harvester in 2018

Darnielle's first book, Black Sabbath: Master of Reality, was published in April 2008 as part of the 33⅓ series. Unlike most other entries in the series, which are non-fiction books that focus on an album's production or legacy, Darnielle's book on Master of Reality was instead a fictional narrative in the form of a novella, centering around a young man held in a psychiatric facility in the mid-1980s who is attempting to retrieve his confiscated Walkman and tape of the album.

Darnielle's first novel, titled Wolf in White Van, was published on September 16, 2014, and was nominated for the National Book Award for Fiction two days later. His second novel, Universal Harvester, was published on February 7, 2017. Darnielle's third novel, Devil House, was published on January 25, 2022. One year later, it was nominated for an Edgar Award for Best Novel.

From 2004 to 2011 Darnielle created and wrote the webzine Last Plane To Jakarta, citing other projects as the reason for its abandonment. He writes the "South Pole Dispatch" feature in Decibel Magazine every month. Darnielle also guest edited the poetry section of The Mays, an anthology of the best creative work coming out of Oxford and Cambridge.

Darnielle wrote the introduction to the June 2016 book The Empty Bottle Chicago: 21+ Years of Music / Friendly / Dancing, about the eponymous nightclub.

In 2025, he released the book In This Year: 365 Songs Annotated: A Book of Days, in which he gives insight into the crafting and meaning of his song lyrics.

In 2026, Darnielle published a novella with the Eden Book Society, a literary hoax created by Dead Ink Books, alongside authors Grady Hendrix, Alison Rumfitt, Nina Allan, Rowan Hisayo Buchanan and Chịkọdịlị Emelụmadụ. The six novellas were published pseudonymously, leaving readers to guess which author wrote which.

== Podcasting ==
In 2012, Darnielle guest starred in John Hodgman's podcast Judge John Hodgman serving as an expert witness and musical guest.

From 2017 to 2019, he co-hosted the podcast "I Only Listen to the Mountain Goats" with Joseph Fink. Each episode of the podcast explores one Mountain Goats song in great detail.

In August 2022 Darnielle appeared as a guest on Margaret Killjoy's podcast "Cool People Who Did Cool Stuff". Darnielle appeared on the episodes "The Diggers, the Levelers, the Ranters and John Darnielle" part one and two.

In March 2023 John appeared on Conan Neutron's Protonic Reversal for a career-spanning interview.

== Acting ==
In January 2023, Darnielle made his acting debut in "Rest in Metal", the fourth episode of Rian Johnson's television series Poker Face. He portrayed Al, a member of a one-hit-wonder metal band called Doxxxology.

== Personal life ==
In the mid-1990s, Darnielle worked in the promotions department at Touch and Go Records in Chicago.

In 1996, Darnielle moved to Grinnell, Iowa, to live with his then-girlfriend, Lalitree Chavanothai, a botanist and musician whom he first met on a music-oriented mailing list. Chavanothai's work later led the pair to move to Colo, Iowa, where they married in April 1998, and then again to nearby Ames. In 2003, desiring a change of scenery, they moved to Durham, North Carolina, where they have resided since. They have two sons, Roman (born 2011) and Moses (born 2014).

Darnielle prays regularly and identifies as a Christian. His music often includes religious themes, including The Life of the World to Come, on which each song is named after a Bible verse; additionally, his work consistently analyzes meanings and interpretations of the text, often through the characters in his songs. He is a fan of Christian singers Amy Grant and Rich Mullins. While living in Iowa, Darnielle also studied Gaudiya Vaishnavism.

Darnielle is a frequent player of the card game Magic: The Gathering. In August 2023, game publisher Wizards of the Coast announced an upcoming collaborative release in which all the cards were designed by Darnielle.

=== Activism ===
Darnielle became a vegetarian in 1996 and by 2007 identified as a vegan. In the same year, he performed at a benefit for the animal welfare organization Farm Sanctuary in Watkins Glen, New York. He performed again at Farm Sanctuary in 2009.

In 2011, Darnielle performed solo in support of Planned Parenthood, at the Stand Up for Women's Health Rally in New York City. In an interview with BuzzFeed, Darnielle identified himself as a feminist, and was described as a "frequent Twitter commentator on women's issues, social justice, and heavy metal."

== Bands in which Darnielle has played ==
Darnielle is also a member or former member of the following bands:

- The Congress, Darnielle's first band, which he founded in high school with a classmate
- The Extra Lens formerly known as The Extra Glenns (along with Franklin Bruno)
  - Releases: two full-lengths titled Martial Arts Weekend & Undercard, as well as a double sided 7-inch EP titled Infidelity
- The Comedians (along with John Vanderslice). The band's only studio recording was credited to "the Mountain Goats and John Vanderslice"
  - Releases: Moon Colony Bloodbath
- The Bloody Hawaiians (along with Joel Huschle (Furniture Huschle), Mark Givens (Wckr Spgt), Caroline)
  - Releases: The Magnificent Bloody Hawaiians, Bastard Son, The Threegos, "Lemon" on Cool Beans #4)
- He is the founder (and was for a while the sole member of) the Mountain Goats since 1991.

== Bibliography ==
=== Novels ===
- Wolf in White Van (2014)
- Universal Harvester (2017)
- Devil House (2022)

=== Novellas ===
- 33 1/3: Master of Reality (2008)

=== Memoirs ===
- This Year: 365 Songs Annotated: A Book of Days (2025)
