= Christopher McGuire =

American musician

- Christopher performing at the Meat Raffle Music Festival #5

Background information
- Born: November 28, 1975 (age 50)
- Origin: Oxford, Ohio
- Instruments: Drum set, percussion
- Labels: Speedstar, Noise McCartney, Barsuk, Chairkickers' Union, V2, Minty Fresh
- Website: www.drumsetplayer.com jp.drumsetplayer.com

Christopher McGuire (born November 28, 1975) is an American drum set player, session drummer, drum teacher, and producer. He is based in Milwaukee, Wisconsin, United States.

== Early life and career ==
Christopher McGuire was raised in a musical family. His mother is a singer and his father is an organist. He grew up in Oxford, Ohio, United States.

In 1992, McGuire and other long-time friends and Oxford natives began the band 12 Rods. The group moved to Minneapolis in 1995. McGuire served as the drummer for the band from the start of their career until late September 1999 when he left the group.

In the summer of 2003, McGuire was hired as a support musician by Japanese band Quruli (くるり) to temporarily fill the position of drummer for the group for summer festival performances. However, in November 2003 he was hired by Quruli as a full-time member. He continued on with the group, both recording and touring, for the next 11 months. In October 2004 it was announced that Christopher would be leaving Quruli due to creative differences. Since his departure, the group has only filled the position of drummer with temporary support musicians.

He is also the ex-drummer for American band Kid Dakota.

Other American bands and artists McGuire has performed and/or recorded with include the Legendary Jim Ruiz Group, The Melismatics, Alva Star, Great Girls Blouse, John Vanderslice, Mark Mallman, Willie Wisely, The Court & Spark, The Mountain Goats, Née Née; She, Sir; questionsinletters, West Elliot, Communist Daughter (band), Puppies, and Faux Jean.

As a producer, McGuire produced Tokyo band Squadcar's second CD while in Japan. He noted the experience as "killer". He has also done production work for Minneapolis bands Barfly and Great Girls Blouse.

McGuire is currently a member of the band Puppies who are from his native Oxford.

He is often recognized by his highly positioned crash cymbal.

In November 2009, McGuire returned to Japan to perform with Japanese band Luminous Orange at a few of their concerts and record with them in the studio. One of the tracks he recorded, titled "Yueqin Spring Moon", is featured on the band's latest release Songs of Innocence.

== Discography ==
12 Rods

- Bliss (1993)
- gay? (1996)
- Split Personalities (1998)
- Separation Anxieties (2000)

Alva Star

- Alligators in the Lobby (2001)

Communist Daughter

- Soundtrack to the End (2010)

The Court & Spark

- Witch Season (2004)

Terry Eason

- Cry Baby EP (2002)

Great Girls Blouse

- EP No. 2 (2001)

Kid Dakota

- So Pretty (2001)
- The West Is the Future (2004)

Luminous Orange

- Songs of Innocence (2010)

Mark Mallman

- How I Lost My Life and Lived To Tell About It (2000)
- Live from First Avenue, Minneapolis (2003)
- Seven Years (2005)

The Melismatics

- Postmodern Rock (2001)

The Mountain Goats

- We Shall All Be Healed (2004)

Puppies

- Sick Machine (2007)
- War & Reconstruction (2011)

questionsinletters

- - - intentionally left blank - - (2004)

Quruli

- Antenna (2004)

Squadcar

- Misses (producer) (2005)

torored

- So Real (2016)

John Vanderslice

- Cellar Door (2004)
