= Mark Mallman discography =

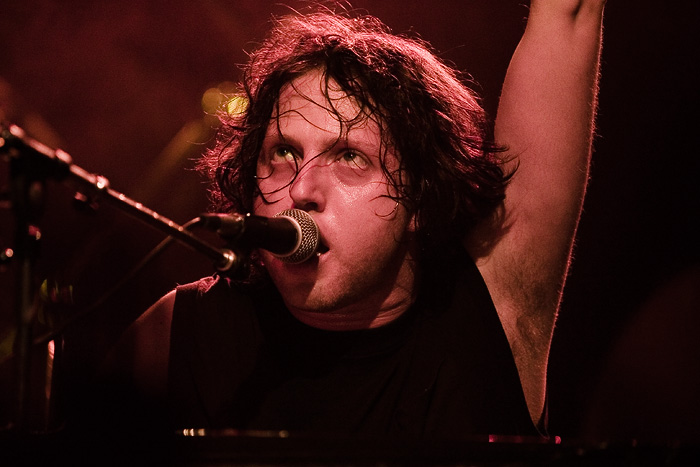
- Mallman during a performance in 2006
- Studio albums: 12
- Extended plays: 4
- Live albums: 1
- Singles: 4
- Music videos: 33
- Spoken word albums: 1
- Compilation albums: 4

This is a list of music released by Minnesota musician Mark Mallman.

== Studio albums ==
=== Solo discography ===
Title	Album details
The Tourist	Released: 1998; Label: Eagles Golden Tooth
How I Lost My Life and Lived to Tell about It	Released: 2000; Label: Eagles Golden Tooth
Mark Mallman and Vermont (with Vermont)	Released: 2001; Label: Guilt Ridden Pop
The Red Bedroom	Released: 2002; Label: Guilt Ridden Pop
Mr. Serious	Released: 2004; Label: Badman Recording Co.
Between the Devil and Middle C	Released: 2006; Label: Badman Recording Co.
Invincible Criminal	Released: 2009; Label: Badman Recording Co.
Double Silhouette	Released: 2012; Label: Eagles Golden Tooth
The End Is Not The End	Released: 2015; Label: Polka Dot Mayhem
Happiness	Released: 2021; Label: Eagles Golden Tooth

=== The Odd discography ===
Title	Album details
Oh My G*d - It's the Odd	Released: 1998; Label: Preaching Leech Productions

=== Ruby Isle discography ===
Title	Album details
Night Shot	Released: 2008; Label: Kindercore
Appetite for Destruction	Released: 2010; Label: Kindercore

== Live albums ==
Title	Album details
Live from First Avenue, Minneapolis	Released: 2003; Label: Susstones

== EPs ==
=== Solo discography ===
Title	Album details
Who's Gonna Save You Now?	Released: 2002; Label: Guilt Ridden Pop
Do You Feel Like Breaking Up?	Released: 2010; Label: self-released

=== Future Wives discography ===
Title	Album details
Dark Side of the Man	Released: 2004; Label: self-released

== Singles ==
Album title	Year	Label
"Minneapolis"	2011	Eagles Golden Tooth
"Monster Movies"	2014	Eagles Golden Tooth
"El Campeon"	2014	Eagles Golden Tooth
"Parasite Eyes"	2015	Eagles Golden Tooth
"I Love You, I Steal Your Gas!" (with Dick Valentine)	2017	self released

== Spoken word ==
Album title	Year	Label
The Incredible Urban Myth of the Invincible Criminal	2009	

== Compilation albums ==
Album title	Year	Label
Seven Years	2005	Eagles Golden Tooth
Outtakes Vol 1 [mp3 download]	2006	mallman.com
Loneliness in America [mp3 download]	2008	mallman.com
Rejects	2016	Eagles Golden Tooth

== Remix albums ==
Album title	Year	Label
Night Shot - The Remixes (with Ruby Isle)	2010	Kindercore

== Contributions and other releases ==
Album title	Year	Label	Contribution
Twin Town Music Yearbook 1997-1998	1997	Pulse of the Twin Cities	Song: "Hyena" (w/ The Odd)
Twin Town Music Yearbook vol. 2 • 1998-1999	1998	Monster X/Pulse of the Twin Cities	Song: "I Married a Skull"
Twin Town Music Yearbook vol. 3 • 1999-2000	1999	Digital Edison/City Pages	Song: "Waking the Neighborhood"
Cheapo Hot Dish	2000	Cheapo/Noiseland Ptd.	Song: "Goodnight Goodbye"
Drum Solo on the Bumpers by Florida	2000	Kactus Cognac	Electric piano on "Little Sunrise"
Amusia by Katastrophy Wife	2001	Almafame	Organ on "Anathema"
Stuck on AM 3: Live from Radio K	2001	Radio K	Song: "Love Look at You" (live)
Silage: Live Recordings from Studio B	2003	KQ92 Homegrown	Song:"Baby Takes it Slow" (live)
Crisp Songs Sampler Vol. 1	2004	Crisp Songs/The Orchard	Song: "Besides the B-Sides"
Audiophile's Guide to the Twin Cities	2004	Pioneer Press/MCAD/Copycats	Song: "True Love"
An Earful of Sound Unseen	2005	Sound Unseen/Copycats	Song: "Missed a Year"
Badman Slow Rock Sampler		Badman	Song: "Hardcore Romantics"
Badman - Winter 2005 Sampler	2005	Badman	Song: "Hardcore Romantics"
The Bootlegs, Vol. 1: Celebrating 35 Years at First Avenue	2005	SRO Productions	Song: "To Speak of the Animal" (live)
Over You by Ben Connelly	2006	AD/CD Records LLC / IODA	Vocals on "I'm Over You"
Revolver USA Sampler Summer '06	2006	Revolver USA	Song: "Death Wish"
Twin Town High Music Yearbook #9	2007	City Pages/Copycats	Song: "Remember the 20th Century"
Buffetlibre Rewind	2008	Buffetlibre	Song: "The Final Cut" (w/ Ruby Isle)
Buffetlibre Rewind	2008	Buffetlibre	Song: "The Boy In The Bubble"
Bristol Nights	2009	Bristol Motor Speedway	Song: "Bristol or Bust" (w/ Ryan Smith)
Minnesota Beatle Project, Vol. I	2009	Vega Productions	Song: "Fool on the Hill"
Heartbeats and Brainwaves by Electric Six	2011	Metropolis Records	Guest performer

== Music videos ==
- "Tell me How A Man Gets Close to You" (2006)
- "Do You Feel Like Breaking Up?" (2008)
- "Invincible Criminal" (2009)
- "White Leather Days" (2009)
- "Mercy Calls" (2009)
- "Friday I'm in Love" (2009, with the Varsity 2009 New Years Crew)
- "Giant Wave (Phase 1)" (2010)
- "The Blood Flow (Phase II)" (2010)
- "Liquid Moth (Phase III)" (2010)
- "Put Your Collar Up" (2011)
- "Pompeii" (2011)
- "Minneapolis" (2011)
- "Dirty Dishes" (2012)
- "Slow the Guillotine" (2013)
- "Monster Movies" (2014)
- "It's Good To Be Alive" (2016)
- "Terrified" (2016)
- "The End Is Not The End" (2016)
- "I Love You, I Steal Your Gas" (2017, with Dick Valentine)
- "Peace On Earth" (2018, with Lazerbeak)
- "Quarantined" (2020)
- "Reverse Paradise" (2020)
- "We Are We" (2020)
- "Fake Gold Silver Chains" (2021)
- "The Beauty Is Alive" (2021)
- "For Love I Will Let Love Go" (2021)
- "Happiness" (2021)

=== With Ruby Isle ===
- "Into the Black" (2007)
- "Teenage Riot" (2007)
- "How it Hurts" (2008)
- "White Winter Hymnal" (Fleet Foxes cover) (2009)
- "Skinny Love" (Bon Iver cover) (2009)
- "The Rake's Song" (The Decemberists cover) (2009)
- "My Girls (Animal Collective cover) (2009)
- "Short Fuse" (Black Lips cover) (2009)
- "Now We Can See" (The Thermals cover) (2009)
- "Elbo.ws2Megamix" (2009)
- "So Damn High" (Free Maxi Mix) (2009)
- "So Damn High" (Will Eastman Club Edit) (2010)
- "Night Shot" (Invasion of the Pussy Snatchers remix) (2010)
- "Mr. Brownstone" (Guns N' Roses cover) (2010)
- "My Michelle" (Guns N' Roses cover) (2010)
- "All the Angles" (2010)

=== With Waxx Maxx ===
- "Phenomena" (2010)
- "Eaten Alive" (2010)
- "Carnival of Souls" (2011)

== Movies ==
- With or Without You (1998) ... Co-worker
