= Romanian names (disambiguation) =

Romanian names or Romanian name may refer to:

- Romanian name, a given name or surname in Romania
- Romanian Names, a 2009 album by John Vanderslice
- Name of Romania, etymology of Romania
