= 12 Rods =

American indie rock band

- Also known as: Ryan'z Bihg Hed (1992)
- Origin: Oxford, Ohio, United States
- Genre: Indie rock
- Years active: 1992–2004; 2015; 2021–2025
- Labels: V2; Chigliak; American-Dreams; Husky Pants
- Website: www.12Rods.site

12 Rods (also known by the stylistic variants 12RODS and Twelve Rods) was an American indie rock band from Minneapolis, Minnesota. The group was formed in Oxford, Ohio in 1992, later relocating to Minneapolis in 1995 where it was based until its initial disbandment in 2004.

Aside from a one-off reunion show in 2015, the band remained inactive until 2021, when frontman Ryan Olcott announced on Facebook that he was making a new album under the 12 Rods name. He released If We Stayed Alive and toured with a new line up.

In June of 2025, Olcott posted to Instagram announcing the band had disbanded again, stating that the members were fired due to insubordination.

== History ==
=== 1992: Formation ===
An early incarnation of 12 Rods was formed in Oxford, Ohio in May 1992, initiated by Talawanda High School student Ryan Olcott. Friends and fellow students Christopher McGuire, Matt Flynn, and Daniel Perlin were members of the band. At this time, the group was known as Ryan'z Bihg Hed, a name coined by Flynn in reference to Olcott's purported behavior during their rehearsals. The band prepared numerous songs for a performance early in the summer of 1992 at a local high school graduation party named "Field Fest 3". A cassette recording of this performance, titled Helikopter Hundrid Dolurz, was their first release before the group disbanded until July 1992, when Olcott was invited to join a new group formed by McGuire, Flynn, and Daniel Burton-Rose at a performance at the end of the summer. Olcott accepted and they name themselves 12RODS, a title Flynn discovered in a passage from a children's Bible.

=== 1993–1995: Career beginnings and relocation ===
The group independently released Bliss in 1993, their first album as 12 Rods, which was recorded in Minneapolis while the members were still living in Oxford. In 1996, one year after relocating to Minneapolis, the band released the EP gay?, which brought the group publicity following a review by Pitchfork where it received one of the few 10.0 ratings given in the publication's history. Former Pitchfork columnist Jason Josephes spoke of gay? favorably in his "Three Blocks from Groove Street" column after he and Pitchfork founder Ryan Schreiber saw 12 Rods' first Minneapolis concert and bought the EP.

=== 1996–2000: V2 Records era ===
In 1996, 12 Rods became the first American act to sign to V2 Records, then a part of Richard Branson's Virgin Group, where gay? was reissued, making it the group's first major label release. The band's next album, Split Personalities, was released in 1998 and named in Pitchfork's first list of the best albums of the 1990s (although it was absent in the second version). Minneapolis musician Bill Shaw joined the group around this time, serving as its bassist until the end of the band's career.

12 Rods released its next album, the Todd Rundgren-produced Separation Anxieties, in 2000. Band members say Rundgren didn't do much during recording:

“All he would do was press the ‘record’ button and go back to doing crossword puzzles,” said Ev Olcott, who, like his brother, wound up producing records for other bands. “Some of those songs are good, but Todd Rundgren did the absolute worst job possible with that record,” Ryan Olcott sneered. “I would straight-up re-record that record before I’d reissue it.”

— Star Tribune

The band was dropped by V2 Records following the album's release, which was a disappointment critically and commercially. Local Minneapolis drummer Dave King became the group's drummer for most of the remainder of its career after McGuire's departure following the recording sessions for Separation Anxieties.

=== 2000–2004: Independent era and disbandment ===
Jake Hansen joined the band in the summer of 2002 as an additional guitarist, and in 2003 George Marich took over drums due to King's touring conflicts with The Bad Plus. The group recorded and released one more album, 2002's self-released Lost Time, then broke up in 2004.

=== Post-disbandment ===
Following the band's first break-up, Ryan Olcott performed solo as Foodteam (and later as c.Kostra), with a band as Mystery Palace, and is a record producer in Minneapolis. Ev Olcott played in Halloween, Alaska and The Few Nice Words, and co-founded audio software company Audiofile Engineering. McGuire played with Kid Dakota, John Vanderslice, The Mountain Goats, Quruli and gives drumming lessons. Flynn currently lives in Cincinnati, Ohio, and performs in a group called the Queen City Silver Stars and The Matt Flynn Jazz Trio, where he plays upright bass. Shaw reformed Post Mortem Grinner and also plays in The Few Nice Words and Halloween, Alaska. King plays actively with Happy Apple, The Bad Plus, Halloween, Alaska, and Dave King Trucking Company.

=== 2011–present: Lost Time reissue and first reunion, documentary, and second reunion ===
On September 7, 2011, it was announced on the website for Justin Vernon's record label Chigliak that 12 Rods had an album awaiting release in the label's "first year of vinyl releases", which began on May 22, 2012, with Amateur Love's It's All Aquatic, produced by Ev Olcott.

On October 8, 2014, 12 Rods announced via Facebook that Chigliak would be reissuing Lost Time on January 20, 2015, and the band would be playing a reunion show at First Avenue in Minneapolis on January 16, 2015 with Ryan Olcott, Ev, Christopher McGuire, Matthew Foust, Matt Flynn, Tal Tahir, Bill Shaw, Dave King, and Jake Hanson.

James Francis Flynn filmed the reunion show as part of a documentary about 12 Rods. Throughout the summer and fall of 2015 he completed gathering the interviews and additional footage for the documentary titled "Accidents Waiting to Happen". The film, modeled after Martin Scorsese's "The Last Waltz," was funded by a Kickstarter campaign and was shown at the Minneapolis Saint Paul International Film Festival in April 2017.

In September 2021, Ryan Olcott announced via the band’s Facebook page that he was making a new 12 Rods record with “zero help, zero support and zero financing”.

On June 20, 2023, a new 12 Rods lineup was announced on the artist's Facebook page, along with a new single, "Twice," the third from new album If We Stayed Alive announced for release on July 7. The album was released on the distribution platform Bandcamp.

On July 14, 2023, 12 Rods performed their first show with the new lineup, consisting of Lars Oslund (guitar), Adri Mehra (bass), Alec Tonjes (drums), and Efren Maldonado (keyboards). The show took place at First Avenue and marked the announcement of a U.S. tour.

On October 31, 2023, it was announced Ryan would be livestreaming solo on Ursa Live. The first stream took place on November 7, 2023, which he would continue to host on a semi-regular basis up until July 2024.

On June 7th 2024, keyboardist Efren Maldonado died unexpectedly at the age of 49. His position in the band had not been replaced by the time of their disbandment.

In April 2025, Ryan Olcott announced the launch of a Patreon page to host exclusive 12 Rods content. Ryan also spoke on his Patreon about writing new music.

On June 14, 2025, a statement on 12 Rods' social media accounts stated that all the members were fired for "insubordination" and 12 Rods would be disbanded until further notice. On November 13 that same year, it was announced on the band's social media that Ryan would be performing a solo set January 7th, 2026 at First Avenue. The post was captioned "further notice", implying that 12 Rods as a project has not been officially retired.

On December 8th, 2025, it was revealed that Ryan would be touring the US and Canada solo under the 12 Rods name.

== Members ==
Current members

- Ryan Olcott – lead vocals, guitar (1992–2004, 2021–present)

Former members

- David King – drums (2000–2004)
- William Shaw – bass guitar (1998–2004)
- Matthew Foust – bass guitar (1994–1996)
- Ev Olcott – synthesizer, guitar, backing vocals (1992–2004)
- Matt Flynn – bass guitar (1992–1994)
- Christopher McGuire – drums (1992–1999)
- Daniel Burton-Rose – guitar (1992)

Former touring members

- Alec Tonjes – Drums (2023–2025)
- Lars Oslund – Guitar (2023–2025)
- Adri Mehra – Bass (2023–2024)
- Efren Maldonado – Keyboards (2023–2024)
- George Marich – drums (2003–2004)
- Jacob Hansen – guitar (2002–2004)
- Alejandro Urzagaste – bass guitar (1998)
- Tal Tahir – bass guitar (1997)

Timeline

== Discography ==
Studio albums

- Bliss (1993)
- Split Personalities (1998)
- Separation Anxieties (2000)
- Lost Time (2002)
- If We Stayed Alive (2023)

EPs

- A Very Special Christmas (1995)
- Gay? (1996)

Compilations

- Unreleased Vol. 1–6 (2004)
- December 1994 4-Track Demos (2023)
- Spring 1997 4-Track Demos (2024)
- December 1992 4-Track Demos (2024)
- Bliss Era 4-Tracks (2024)
- Block Rockin' Demos (2025)

Live albums

- Helikopter Hundrid Dolurz (1992)
- Last Show: First Avenue (2004)
- Reunion Show: First Avenue (2015)
- 2004-05-29 Big Wu Family Reunion (2025)
