= Keep the Dream Alive =

Keep The Dream Alive or Keeping the Dream Alive may refer to:

== Songs ==
- "Keep The Dream Alive", a song by Praga Khan from the 2000 album Mutant Funk
- "Keep The Dream Alive", a single Tony Mills (musician)
- "Keep The Dream Alive", a single by Light of the World (band)
- "Keep The Dream Alive", a song by John Vanderslice, from the 2001 album Time Travel Is Lonely
- "Keep the Dream Alive", a song performed by Kelly King at the 2013 Viña del Mar International Song Festival
- "Keep The Dream Alive", a song by Oasis from the 2005 album Don't Believe the Truth
- "Keeping the Dream Alive", a song by Münchener Freiheit from the 1988 album Fantasy

== Other uses ==
- Keep The Dream Alive (album), a 1977 album by jazz saxophonist David "Fathead" Newman
- "Keep The Dream Alive", Martin Luther King Humanitarian award won by Wolfgang Busch and many others
- Keep the Dream Alive (sculpture), Spokane
- Keeping the Dream Alive, a 2026 memoir by Joanna Cherry
