= Mass Suicide Occult Figurines =

Studio album by John Vanderslice
- Released: July 11, 2000
- Genre: Indie rock
- Length: 33:47
- Label: Barsuk

John Vanderslice chronology
The Dream Is Over (1999)	Mass Suicide Occult Figurines (2000)	Time Travel Is Lonely (2001)

Professional ratings
Review scores
Source	Rating
AllMusic	4/5 stars
Entertainment Weekly	A−
Pitchfork	8.1/10

Mass Suicide Occult Figurines is the debut album by John Vanderslice, released in 2000. It is named after a line in Neutral Milk Hotel's "Song Against Sex".

== Reception ==
In anticipation of Vanderslice's fourth album Cellar Door, CMJ New Music Monthly's Louis Miller described the album as "a perfectly disjointed pop album." Exclaim! wrote that "Vanderslice uses a mix of traditional rock instrumentation spiced with the occasional strings to bring his pop visions to life."

== Track listing ==
No.	Title	Length
1.	"Confusion Boats"	3:42
2.	"Speed Lab"	3:28
3.	"Bill Gates Must Die"	3:43
4.	"Ambition"	3:25
5.	"Josie Anderson"	2:21
6.	"Interlude"	2:26
7.	"Big Band Stars"	4:15
8.	"Gruesome Details"	2:11
9.	"And What Did You Do Today"	1:57
10.	"Foothills of My Mind"	3:51
11.	"Mass Suicide Occult Figurines"	2:27
