= Bill Gates Must Die =

2000 song performed by John Vanderslice

Single by John Vanderslice

from the album Mass Suicide Occult Figurines
- Released: July 11, 2000
- Genre: Indie rock
- Length: 3:43
- Label: Barsuk Records
- Songwriter(s): John Vanderslice

John Vanderslice singles chronology
"Speed Lab" (2000)	"Bill Gates Must Die" (2000)	"Ambition" (2000)

Music video
- "Bill Gates Must Die" on YouTube

"Bill Gates Must Die" is the third track on John Vanderslice's Mass Suicide Occult Figurines album released in 2000 on Barsuk Records.

== Release ==
A CD-ROM edition of Mass Suicide Occult Figurines was made to parody the Windows 95 installation disc.

On 9 February 2000, SF Weekly reported that Vanderslice had trouble releasing a number of promotional compact discs of the album Mass Suicide Occult Figurines featuring the track "Bill Gates Must Die". The Los Altos, California-based CD manufacturer Media Technology Services declined the release stating they took issue with the submitted cover art that spoofed the Microsoft logo. Sales associate of the company, Parvis Ghajar, said "By looking at [the CD], it implied that it was by Microsoft, and we didn't want to have Microsoft come after this." The song later appeared on the Fortune Records' local music compilation album Fortune Cookies.

== Reception ==
=== Fortune Cookies release ===
Reviewing the Fortune Records' compilation album Fortune Cookies, Allmusic's Denise Sullivan called "Bill Gates Must Die" an "adolescent rock rant." CMJ New Music Monthly called the song "a soon-to-be hit." Ink 19's Jason Feifer called it one of the "a few sloppy mounds of music [...] that provides nothing particularly special or new."

=== Mass Suicide Occult Figurines release ===
Allmusic's Matt Fink reviewed "Bill Gates Must Die" with "the big bruising guitars [...] drive lyrics that are surprisingly free of attack on the multi-billionaire, instead telling the story of a man whose life is ruined by his obsessive internet use." In anticipation for Vanderslice's fourth album Cellar Door, CMJ New Music Monthly's Louis Miller described the song as "minor media sensation [...] complete with a made-up lawsuit and Vanderslice's claims of being pushed around by Microsoft goons." Pitchfork Media's Nick Mirov preferred the song "Speed Lab" over it stating that "allusions to paranoia about internet security loopholes and federal eavesdropping don't quite coalesce into the damning, righteous indictment of Microsoft that the title would suggest. For this particular computer geek, it's a bit of a letdown."
