= Appetite for Destruction (disambiguation) =

Appetite for Destruction is a 1987 album by Guns N' Roses.

Appetite for Destruction may also refer to:

- Appetite for Destruction (Ruby Isle album) (2010)
- "Appetite for Destruction" (song), a 1991 song by N.W.A.
- Appetite for Destruction, a painting by Robert Williams
- Appetite for Destruction, a professional wrestling tag team consisting of Kevin Steen and Super Dragon
- "Appetite for Destruction" (Dawson's Creek), a 2001 episode
- "Appetite for Destruction", an episode of The Loud House

== See also ==
- Appetite for Disctruction, a 2000 album by Funkstörung
