= Revolute =

Revolute may mean:

- in botany, having the edges rolled down or back; see Glossary of botanical terms#R
  - Revolute leaf
- in engineering, being able to rotate but not slide (of a joint)
- "Revolute", a song by 12 Rods from Gay?

== See also ==
- Revolut
