= All That the Rain Promises =

Studio album by Bombadil
- Released: November 2, 2011

Bombadil chronology
Tarpits and Canyonlands (2009)	All That the Rain Promises (2011)	Thank You (2012)

All That the Rain Promises is North Carolina band Bombadil's third full-length album which was released on November 2, 2011. The band members when the record was released were James Phillips, Bryan Rahija, Daniel Michalak and Stuart Robinson. The album contains eleven songs. It was named after the book All That the Rain Promises and More, which is about mushrooms. It was recorded in a barn in Happy Valley, Oregon where the Decemberists have also recorded. The album took ten days to record.
