= If We Stayed Alive =

Studio album by 12 Rods
- Released: July 7, 2023
- Recorded: 2021–2022
- Studio: Carleton Lofts in St. Paul, Minnesota, US
- Genre: Indie rock
- Length: 28:15
- Language: English
- Label: American Dreams/Husky Pants
- Producer: Ryan Olcott

12 Rods chronology
Lost Time (2002)	If We Stayed Alive (2023)

If We Stayed Alive is a 2023 studio album by American indie rock band 12 Rods, their first studio work in 21 years. The album has received positive reviews from critics.

== Reception ==
This was the Album of the Week at KCMP, where Jade Tittle called it "a tighter, melodic nostalgia album from the band that scored a perfect 10 in Pitchfork's early days". Brad Shoup of Pitchfork rated this album 7.3 out of 10, characterizing it as "more than pandemic-motivated housecleaning", "a proper comeback", and "a stirring achievement for an act that had come so far so fast, only to find itself out of place, and out of time". At Spill Magazine, Ljubinko Zivkovic gave this album an 8 out of 10, summing up that "the seven tunes here are brimming with that ringing guitar sound and multi-layered vocals, where brushing up the arrangements and production just accentuated the fact that a good song remains a good song, no matter how much time passes by".

== Track listing ==
All songs written by Ryan Olcott.

1. "All I Can Think About" – 1:47
2. "My Year (This Is Going to Be)" – 3:03
3. "Private Spies" – 4:32
4. "Comfortable Situation" – 5:11
5. "The Beating" – 3:48
6. "Hide Without Delay" – 5:13
7. "Twice" – 4:41

== Personnel ==
12 Rods

- Ryan Olcott – vocals, instrumentation, recording, mixing, production, mastering

Additional personnel

- Michael Vallera – photography, art, layout

== See also ==
- 2023 in American music
- List of 2023 albums
