= Life and Death of an American Fourtracker =

Studio album by John Vanderslice
- Released: May 7, 2002
- Recorded: January–December 2001
- Genre: Indie rock
- Length: 35:06
- Label: Barsuk

John Vanderslice chronology
Time Travel Is Lonely (2001)	Life and Death of an American Fourtracker (2002)	Cellar Door (2004)

Professional ratings
Review scores
Source	Rating
Allmusic	4/5 stars
Pitchfork Media	7.9/10

Life and Death of an American Fourtracker was the third album by John Vanderslice, released in 2002.

== Track listing ==
All songs by John Vanderslice unless otherwise noted

1. "Fiend in a Cloud" (Blake, Vanderslice)
2. "Me and My 424"
3. "Underneath the Leaves"
4. "Interlude No. 4"
5. "The Mansion"
6. "Nikki Oh Nikki" (Darnielle, Vanderslice)
7. "Amitriptyline"
8. "Greyhound"
9. "Interlude No. 5" (Barnett, Vanderslice)
10. "Cool Purple Mist" (Darnielle, Vanderslice)
11. "From Out Here"
12. "Fiend in a Cloud, Pt. 2"
