= Emerald City (John Vanderslice album) =

Studio album by John Vanderslice
- Released: July 24, 2007
- Genre: Indie rock
- Length: 38:16
- Label: Barsuk

John Vanderslice chronology
Pixel Revolt (2005)	Emerald City (2007)	Romanian Names (2009)

Emerald City is the sixth album by American singer-songwriter John Vanderslice. It was officially released in the United States on July 24, 2007, after having been leaked to the internet on or around June 23, 2007.

Professional ratings
Review scores
Source	Rating
Allmusic	link
Metacritic	(82/100) link
Pitchfork Media	(6.2/10)
The Wheel's Still in Spin	link
Slant	link

== Background ==
Vanderslice has said about the album: "I was so beaten down after the 2000 election and after 9/11 and then the invasion of Iraq, Afghanistan; I was so depleted as a person after all that stuff happened, that I had to write my way out of it. I really had to write political songs because for me it is a way of making sense and processing what is going on."

The name of the album references both the nickname of the fortified Green Zone in Baghdad and the name of the city in The Wizard of Oz.

== Track listing ==
1. "Kookaburra" (5:30)
2. "Time to Go" (2:28)
3. "The Parade" (4:41)
4. "White Dove" (4:00)
5. "Tablespoon of Codeine" (5:26)
6. "The Tower" (4:06)
7. "The Minaret" (4:27)
8. "Numbered Lithograph" (2:22)
9. "Central Booking" (5:16)

== Critical reception ==
Emerald City achieved a score of 82/100 on Metacritic. Entertainment Weekly called the album "a gleaming gem" that doesn't disappoint. Billboard's review of the record called Vanderslice an "always perceptive lyricist". Calling Vanderslice a "master story-teller", Matt Fink of Paste said that Emerald City was "vividly imagined yet subtle in tone, with conflicted character sketches unfolding around somber synth melodies, creaky electronic effects, and fuzzy acoustic guitar strums."
