= Ruby Isle =

American band

- Years active: 2007 -
- Label: Kindercore
- Members: Mark Mallman; Dan Geller; Aaron LeMay
- Website: http://kindercore.com/bands/view/ruby-isle

Ruby Isle is a band created when Mark Mallman joined with his high school friend Dan Geller (co-founder of Kindercore Records) and drummer Aaron LeMay. They released an EP, Into the Black in 2007 and released their first full-length album Night Shot in 2008.

== elbo.ws covers ==
In late 2007, Ruby Isle started a project in which they covered the No. 1 song on indie music blog aggregator elbo.ws. The first pressing of their album Night Shot included all the covers from the first wave of this project:

1. "Shadow Falls" (Hello Blue Roses)
2. "Aly Walk with Me" (The Raveonettes)
3. "Tyrant" (Black Mountain)
4. "Foam Hands" (Destroyer)
5. "Gila" (Beach House)
6. "The Planes of Baltimore" (Stephen Malkmus/MIA)

- Ruby Isle missed a week, so they took two weeks' number ones ("Baltimore" by Stephen Malkmus and "Paper Planes" by MIA) and created one "mash-up" cover

7. "Sax Rohmer No. 1" (The Mountain Goats)
8. "Cherry Tulips" (Headlights)

=== elbo.ws II ===
In January 2009, they started the project again, this time also making videos for the covers, which were posted on YouTube:

1. "White Winter Hymnal" (Fleet Foxes)
2. "Skinny Love" (Bon Iver)
3. "The Rake's Song" (The Decemberists)
4. "My Girls (Animal Collective)
5. "Short Fuse" (Black Lips)
6. "Now We Can See" (The Thermals)

== Discography ==
=== Studio albums ===
- Night Shot (2008, Kindercore)
- Appetite for Destruction (2010, Kindercore)

=== Singles/EPs ===
- Into the Black EP (2007, Kindercore)
- "Someday" (The Strokes cover) [free mp3 download] (2009, Kindercore)

=== Remix albums ===
- Night Shot - The Remixes (2010)

=== Contributions and other releases ===
- Xmas 3 - The War on Christmas! (2007, Kindercore)
  - Song: "Jack's Obsession"
- Rewind (2008, Buffetlibre)
  - Song: "The Final Cut"
