= Lost Time (12 Rods album) =

Studio album by 12 Rods
- Released: October 15, 2002
- Genre: Indie rock
- Length: 39:04
- Producer: Ryan Olcott

12 Rods chronology
Separation Anxieties (2000)	Lost Time (2002)	If We Stayed Alive (2023)

Professional ratings
Review scores
Source	Rating
Pitchfork Media	(8.1/10) link
Sputnikmusic	4.2/5

Lost Time is a 2002 album by indie rock band 12 Rods. It was the band's fourth full-length album.

== Track listing ==
1. "Universal Time" – 1:15
2. "Fake Magic 8-ball" – 3:38
3. "24 Hours Ago" – 4:02
4. "One Thing Does Not Belong" – 3:06
5. "Boy In The Woods" – 3:48
6. "Summertime Vertigo" – 4:37
7. "Accidents Waiting To Happen" – 4:00
8. "Terrible Hands" – 3:36
9. "The Time Is Right (To Be Wrong)" – 3:30
10. "Lost/Found" – 2:29
11. "Telephone Holiday" – 4:41
