= Bliss (12 Rods album) =

Studio album by 12 Rods
- Released: May 15, 1993
- Recorded: Metro Studio "C", Minneapolis, Minnesota
- Studio: Metro Studio G (Minneapolis), February 10–12, 1993
- Genre: Alternative, Indie
- Label: self-released
- Producer: Ev (Olcott) and 12 Rods

12 Rods chronology
Bliss (1993)	Gay? (1996)

Bliss is a 1993 album by 12 Rods.

== Track listing ==
- All songs written by Ryan Olcott, except where noted.
1. "Stella" (4:17)
2. "Repeat" (4:35)
3. "Choke" (Olcott, Dan Perlin 2:12)
4. "When Comes Sunday" (5:15)
5. "Day By Day" (3:32)
6. "I Am Faster" (4:53)
7. "Come Down On Me" (5:50)
8. "Megabright" (6:26)
9. "Tell a Lie" (5:19)
10. "Mr. Whipple" (Olcott, Perlin 2:51)
11. "Bliss" (5:07)
12. "Rainman" (3:22)

== Personnel ==
=== 12 Rods ===
- Ryan Olcott: vocals, guitars
- Matt Flynn: bass
- Christopher McGuire: drums

=== Additional personnel ===
- EV Olcott: saxophone, recorder, keyboards
