= Split Personalities (album) =

1998 studio album by 12 Rods

Studio album by 12 Rods
- Released: July 28, 1998
- Genre: Alternative rock, indie rock
- Length: 51:05
- Label: V2 Records
- Producer: 12 Rods

12 Rods chronology
Gay? (1996)	Split Personalities (1998)	Separation Anxieties (2000)

Professional ratings
Review scores
Source	Rating
AllMusic	4/5 stars
Pitchfork Media	9.7/10

Split Personalities is the second album by 12 Rods, released in 1998.

== Critical reception ==
The Washington Post wrote that "the clamorous yet tuneful 'Chromatically Declining Me' adds synthbeats and raga-rock riffs to the mix, while both 'I Am Faster' and 'Girl Sun' build noisy rockers atop blithe bossa novas." The Stuart News though that 12 Rods "are nothing less than an American hybrid of Radiohead's ethereal beauty mixed with head-banging metal riffing topped with a singer who sounds like Ozzy Osbourne whining." City Pages opined that the "police siren of a voice and the band's smart-rock overachieving begin to sound like great pop with repeated exposure."

In 2005, City Pages included "Part of 2" on its list of the greatest Minnesota-made records of all time.

== Track listing ==
1. "Split Personality" – 5:35
2. "Red" – 6:34
3. "I Am Faster" – 6:43
4. "Chromatically Declining Me" – 3:55
5. "Part of 2" – 3:23
6. "The Stupidest Boy" – 5:17
7. "I Wish You Were a Girl" – 5:37
8. "Lovewaves" – 3:49
9. "Make-Out Music" – 4:01
10. "Girl Sun" – 6:12

== Personnel ==
- Ryan Olcott – vocals, guitars, synthesizers, bass
- Ev Olcott – synthesizers, guitars, vocals
- Christopher McGuire – drums
- Bill Jackson – bass on "Chromatically Declining Me", "The Stupidest Boy", "I Wish You Were a Girl", "Lovewaves", "Girl Sun"
- Kevin Matheny – trombone on "Lovewaves"
