= Separation Anxieties =

2000 studio album by 12 Rods

Studio album by 12 Rods
- Released: June 20, 2000
- Recorded: 1999
- Genre: Alternative rock
- Length: 52:48
- Label: V2 Records
- Producer: Todd Rundgren

12 Rods chronology
Split Personalities (1998)	Separation Anxieties (2000)	Lost Time (2002)

Professional ratings
Review scores
Source	Rating
AllMusic	3/5 stars
Pitchfork	2.0/10

Separation Anxieties is a 2000 album by 12 Rods. It was the band's third full-length album.

== Recording ==
Separation Anxieties was recorded on the island of Kauai with famed producer Todd Rundgren over the course of six weeks. However, the band thought negatively of his performance. According to vocalist and guitarist Ryan Olcott, "Todd was underperforming. He was the last person to show up at each session and the first one to leave. He didn't care. He was just there to press 'record', read magazines, and drink Foster's. It was disheartening." Ev Olcott remembered, "All he would do was press the 'record' button and go back to doing crossword puzzles. Some of those songs are good, but Todd Rundgren did the absolute worst job possible with that record." Adding to the sessions' troubles, drummer Christopher McGuire had left the band during the recording process after just three weeks, leaving the band to finish recording the album by themselves.

== Reception ==
Separation Anxieties garnered mostly negative reviews upon its release. Pitchfork, which had previously given 12 Rods' prior work rave reviews (with Gay? receiving the website's first perfect rating and Split Personalities receiving a 9.7), gave Separation Anxieties a 2.0 out of a possible 10, with writer Matt LeMay panning the album: "This record is acid reflux, gastroenteritis, and dysentery all rolled into one." Exclaim! also gave Separation Anxieties a negative review, with writer Cam Lindsay writing that the "melodies seem to have potential, but are then ruined by either the "futuristic-ness" or the terrible lyrics."

However, over time, the album has garnered a more positive reaction among fans and critics. AllMusic gave the album 3 stars out of a possible 5 and claimed that "the quirky pop edge that helped make earlier releases such a joy is still present". Justin Vernon of the indie-folk band Bon Iver is a noted fan of the album, stating: "All my picks would come from the last two records. So insanely good. I went and sold 95% of my CDs and probably kept 100 or 150 of my most important records to me, and these two are list toppers." He also named four songs off Separation Anxieties as some of his favorites of the band's work, mentioning "Marionette", "What Has Happened", "Rock n' Roll Band" and "Glad That It's Over" as highlights.

== Track listing ==
1. "Kaboom" – 4:00
2. "What Has Happened?" – 2:56
3. "Astrogimp" – 3:57
4. "Radioaction" – 4:17
5. "I Think I'm Flying" – 3:56
6. "Your Secret's Safe With Me" – 5:30
7. "Marionette" – 3:04
8. "You Gotta Go" – 3:25
9. "Everybody" – 4:05
10. "Rock N' Roll Band" – 7:14
11. "Repeat" – 5:01
12. "Glad That It’s Over" – 4:36
