= Marathon IV: Road Rogue =

Marathon IV: Road Rogue was an eight-day experimental music performance by Minneapolis musician and composer Mark Mallman. The project consisted of a continuous, 180-plus hour mobile webcast from the back of a van as it traveled from New York City to Los Angeles. The vehicle was equipped with technology that translated brain waves and heart rhythms into electronic music, allowing the artist to continue performing while he was sleeping.

== Origins ==
Mark Mallman is a Minneapolis piano-based rock musician known for pushing creative and physical limits on stage. Among his most notable performances are a series of “Marathon” events. In 1999, he penned and performed a 26.2 hour song titled “Marathon” at St. Paul's Turf Club. Five years later he doubled the feat with a 52.4 hour “Marathon 2” performance. And in October 2010 he completed “Marathon 3,” a 78.6-hour song that stretched across four days.

The “Marathon 4” concept emerged from conversations with Stuart DeVaan, a musician and technologist whose company Implex had provided live video streaming services for Marathon 3. DeVaan designed and built the rolling performance space inside a 1992 Vandura conversion van, complete with cameras, mixers, laptops, antennas and a data center to deliver. The duo also partnered with video producer Hamil Griffin-Cassidy and musician Gus Watkins.

== Performance ==
The performance began Sept. 15, 2012, in New York City and concluded eight days later in Los Angeles following stops in Pittsburgh, Detroit, Chicago, Omaha, Denver and Las Vegas. The song featured few vocals and consisted of a largely ambient soundscape. “Sometimes I’m making up lyrics and music and playing live. And then sometimes the machine makes its own music based on instructions.” From sunrise to sunset the musicians performed using conventional electronic music instruments, including electric guitar, a Yamaha keytar, iPad apps, a hacked NES cartridge and other gadgets. After dark it transitioned to a sleep-mode soundscape generated from the artist's own biorhythms.

== Technology ==
As the sun set, the musician hooked himself up to a Polar heart-rate monitor and a Mattel Mindflex headset, both of which fed into a laptop through an Arduino-based microcontroller kit. Ableton Live sequencing software translated the signals into MIDI messages. One MIDI channel set the song's tempo based on the heart-rate monitor. Meanwhile, a homebrew program called BioWave turned the brain output into an additional 10 MIDI signals to produce “ambient, chordal soundscapes.” The software was developed by a University of Georgia student.

During the day, the artist channeled brain waves through a program called Mind Synth using a different neuroheadset called the Emotiv Epoc, sometimes used to control wheelchairs. The van was also equipped with five video cameras, mixers, analog-to-digital converters, and a data center containing a video encoding system and two-carrier cellular data system with outboard antennas.

== Objective ==
Mallman wanted to build on his 78.6 hour “Marathon 3” performance but believed he was reaching the limit of what could be accomplished in a conventional performance and venue. “I had to abandon my body at a certain point, because it was just holding me back.” Initially he drew plans for a machine that would move his arms up and down mechanically before moving on to focus on generating sounds from his body's involuntary systems. “For me, it’s about exploring the back of the mind in music.”

The artist also sought to abandon the traditional concept of what a venue is. There was no in-person audience beyond the musicians and technicians inside the van, though the performance was broadcast live on the artist's website, MarkMallman.com.
