= Pixel Revolt =

Studio album by John Vanderslice
- Released: August 23, 2005 (US)
- Recorded: December 2004 – April 2005
- Genre: Indie rock
- Length: 53:36
- Label: Barsuk
- Producer: Scott Solter

John Vanderslice chronology
| Cellar Door (2004) | Pixel Revolt (2005) | Emerald City (2007) |

Professional ratings
Review scores
| Source | Rating |
|---|---|
| Allmusic | link |
| Pitchfork Media | 8.3/10 8/26/05 |
| PopMatters | 8/10 8/18/05 |
| Slant | link |

Pixel Revolt is an album by American singer-songwriter John Vanderslice. It was released on August 23, 2005.

== Release ==
In addition to the normal track listing, a track titled "The Kingdom" can be found on the Japanese compact disc and vinyl versions of the record (on the vinyl release "The Kingdom" is track 9 and the remaining tracks follow accordingly). According to Vanderslice, the piece thematically belongs on the record but "bogs it down", and was left off the American CD release.

== Track listing ==
1. "Letter to the East Coast"
2. "Plymouth Rock"
3. "Exodus Damage"
4. "Peacocks in the Video Rain"
5. "Trance Manual"
6. "New Zealand Pines"
7. "Radiant with Terror"
8. "Continuation"
9. "Dear Sarah Shu"
10. "Farewell Transmission"
11. "Angela"
12. "Dead Slate Pacific"
13. "The Golden Gate"
14. "CRC 7173, Affectionately"
15. "The Kingdom" (Japanese CD release)
