= Dagger Beach =

Studio album by John Vanderslice
- Released: June 11, 2013 (US)
- Genre: Indie rock
- Length: 38:32
- Label: Tiny Telephone
- Producer: Ian Pellicci and John Vanderslice

John Vanderslice chronology
White Wilderness (2011)	Dagger Beach (2013)	Vanderslice Plays Diamond Dogs (2013)

Professional ratings
Review scores
Source	Rating
Consequence of Sound	3.5/5 stars
Pitchfork	6.2/10 stars

Dagger Beach is the ninth album by American singer-songwriter John Vanderslice. It was self-released on June 11, 2013, financed by a Kickstarter campaign.

== Track listing ==
All songs written and composed by John Vanderslice except "Song For the Landlords of Tiny Telephone" written by Shawn Alpay and "interlude 2" by Rob Shelton.

1. "Raw Wood" (3:18)
2. "Harlequin Press" (3:27)
3. "Song For Dana Lok" (2:21)
4. "How The West Was Won" (3:48)
5. "Interlude #1" (2:12)
6. "Song For David Berman" (4:54)
7. "Damage Control" (4:22)
8. "Song For The Landlords Of Tiny Telephone" (1:32)
9. "Gaslight" (2:45)
10. "Sleep It Off" (2:43)
11. "Sonogram" (2:25)
12. "North Coast Rep" (4:05)
13. "Interlude #2" (:47)
