= Night Shot – The Remixes =

Night Shot - The Remixes

Remix album by Ruby Isle
- Released: November 24, 2009
- Label: Kindercore

Ruby Isle chronology
Night Shot (2008)	Night Shot - The Remixes (2009)	Appetite for Destruction (2010)

Mark Mallman chronology
The Incredible Urban Myth of the Invincible Criminal (2009)	Night Shot - The Remixes (2010)	Do You Feel Like Breaking Up? (2010)

Night Shot – The Remixes is a 2009 remix album by Ruby Isle. It was released through iTunes on November 24, 2009 and was released as an on-demand CDR through Amazon.com on April 7, 2010

== Track listing ==
1. "So Damn High" (Will Eastman Club Edit) (4:38)
2. "Hey Hey Hey" (Le Chansons Remix) (3:13)
3. "No Sweatpants" (Aaron Lemay Remix) (2:35)
4. "Atom Bombs" (Immuzikation Remix) (2:54)
5. "Night Shot" (GraveRobbers Arena Rock '85 Remix) (3:12)
6. "Someday" (feat. Kathie Pony Hixon Smitth) (Onslaught of the Aquamen Remix) (2:52)
7. "So Damn High" (Stay Free Maxi Mix) (2:54)
8. "Stand Back" (Incesteral Maneuvers in the Dark Mix) (2:41)
9. "Night Shot" (Invasion of the Pussy Snatchers Mix) (2:37)
10. "All the Angels" (The Gold Party Remix) (3:16)
11. "Miracles" (Food Team Remix) (4:20)
12. "So Damn High" (Christian Fritz Remix) (5:31)
13. "All the Angels" (Big Fun 4ever's SVU Mix) (4:33)
