= Tarpits and Canyonlands =

Studio album by Bombadil
- Released: July 7, 2009

Bombadil chronology
A Buzz, a Buzz (2008)	Tarpits and Canyonlands (2009)	All That the Rain Promises (2011)

Tarpits and Canyonlands is North Carolina folk-pop band Bombadil's second full-length album, which was released on July 7, 2009. The band members when the record was released were James Phillips, Bryan Rahija, Daniel Michalak and Stuart Robinson. The album contains fifteen songs. It was re-released in 2014.
