= Names of the Aromanians =

Ethnonyms applied to a Balkanic people

There are several names of the Aromanians used throughout the Balkans, both autonyms (like armân) and exonyms (like Vlach).

== Aromanian ==
The names armân/arumân, just as român/rumân (Romanian), derive directly from Latin Romanus ("Roman") through regular sound changes (see Name of Romania). Adding "a" in front of certain words that begin with a consonant is a regular feature of the Aromanian language.

In Greece variants include arumâni and armâni. An older form of "rumân", was still found in the 19th century, in folk songs in Greece. In Albania, the most common form is rămăńi, with occasional forms rumăńi and romăńi.

The form, aromân, used especially by the Aromanians of Romania, is a modern creation, a blend of român (used by the Daco-Romanians) and arumân (used by the Aromanians in Greece). The form "Aromanian", created by analogy with the word "Romanian", was first used by Gustav Weigand in 1894/1895 to replace terms such as "Macedonian Vlachs" or "Macedo-Romanians".

== Vlach ==
Vlachs was a term used in the Medieval Balkans, as an exonym of Germanic origin for all the Romanic people of the region, but nowadays, it is commonly used only for the Aromanians and Megleno-Romanians, the Romanians being named Vlachs only in historical context and in Serbia.

Greeks also use the name "Koutsovlach" ("lame Vlach"; Greek: κουτσόβλαχος, romanized: koutsóvlachos, plural: κουτσόβλαχοι, koutsóvlachoi). Greek scholar Asterios I. Koukoudes considers the term to be derogatory and offensive for the Aromanians. Archbishop of Athens Spyridon Vlachos pointed out to politician Alexandros Svolos that "anyone who refers to them Koutsovlachs is a lame writer himself".

== Macedo-Romanian ==
Macedo-Romanian (macedo-român, derived from "Macedonia" and "Romanian") is a form created by the modern linguists and ethnologists in analogy with the other Eastern Romance languages: Daco-Romanian (or proper Romanian) in Dacia, Istro-Romanian in Istria and Megleno-Romanian in Meglenia. Although quite often used, it is a rather improper form, as the Aromanians can be found all across the Balkans, not only in Macedonia.

== Macedonian ==
One of the traditional names of Aromanians in the geographical region of Macedonia was Macedonians. It is widespread in Romania.

== Tsintsar ==
Another name used to refer to the Aromanians (mainly in the Slavic countries such as Serbia and Bulgaria is tsintsar (цинцар) and in Hungary cincár) derived from the way the Aromanians pronounce /tʃe/ and /tʃi/ as /tse/ and /tsi/. However, there is also a theory that says that the term is derived from the way the Aromanians say the word 'five': tsintsi, this being according to some from the fifth Roman legion which settled in Balkans at the end of their service. The Albanian variant of this name is "xinxarë" /dzi'ndzarə/.

== Other names ==
- çoban – "shepherd", a term used by some of the Turks, as well as the Albanians, although Albanians also use "vllah" (derived from "Vlach") and rëmër
- rëmër, "Roman", an Albanian word derived from "Romanus".

== Bibliography ==
- Capidan, Theodor (1932) Aromânii. Dialectul aromân, Academia Română.
- Trifon, Nicolas (2005) "The Aromanians, a people on the move".
