= Live from First Avenue, Minneapolis =

Live album by Mark Mallman
- Released: September 23, 2003
- Recorded: November 9, 2001–April 19, 2003
- Genre: Singer-songwriter
- Length: 47:33
- Label: Susstones

Mark Mallman chronology
Who's Gonna Save You Now? (2003)	Live from First Avenue, Minneapolis (2003)	Mr. Serious (2004)

Professional ratings
Review scores
Source	Rating
AllMusic	3/5 stars

Live from First Avenue, Minneapolis was released by Mark Mallman in 2003. Fifth album from Mallman. It was released on September 23, 2003 on Susstones and re-released on Jackpine Social Club on February 28, 2006.

== Track listing ==
1. "Cannibalive"
2. "Who's Gonna Save You Now?"
3. "Natural Blues"
4. "Hook Hand"
5. "Butcher's Ballad"
6. "Goodnight Goodbye"
7. "Life Between Heartbeats"
8. "Baby Takes It Slow"
9. "Love Look at You"
10. "We Only Have Each Other in the Night"
11. "Mother Made Me Do It"
12. "The Dead Bedroom" (Closing Theme)

=== Enhanced CD bonuses ===
Also included on the CD are bonuses accessible through a computer's CD-ROM drive:

- "Cinnamon Girl" mp3 (bonus live recording)
- Live video of "Butcher's Ballad"

== Personnel ==
- Ryan Smith/Jacques Wait — guitars
- Kathie Hixon — bass
- Peter Anderson — drums
- Eric Kassel — synthesizer
- Mark Wade — upright bass

Extra personnel

- Lila Mallman — Guest vocals on "Mother Made Me Do It"
- Missy Heitz — vocals on "Dead Bedroom"
- Christopher McGuire — extra percussion on "Butcher's Ballad"

Production

- Lee Marcucci/Ron Anderson/Tom Cesario/Myles Kennedy — Live engineers
- Dan Witt/Scot Tuma/Dan Boen/Eric Furlong — tracking
- Ed Ackerson — mixing
- Brad Cassetto — mastering

== Recording information ==
The album was recorded at the First Avenue Mainroom (4/19/2003) and 7th Street Entry (11/22/2002) - with the exception of "Butcher's Ballad" recorded in the Mainroom (11/9/2001). "Dead Bedroom" is the exit music, which was prerecorded.
