= Bombadil (band) =

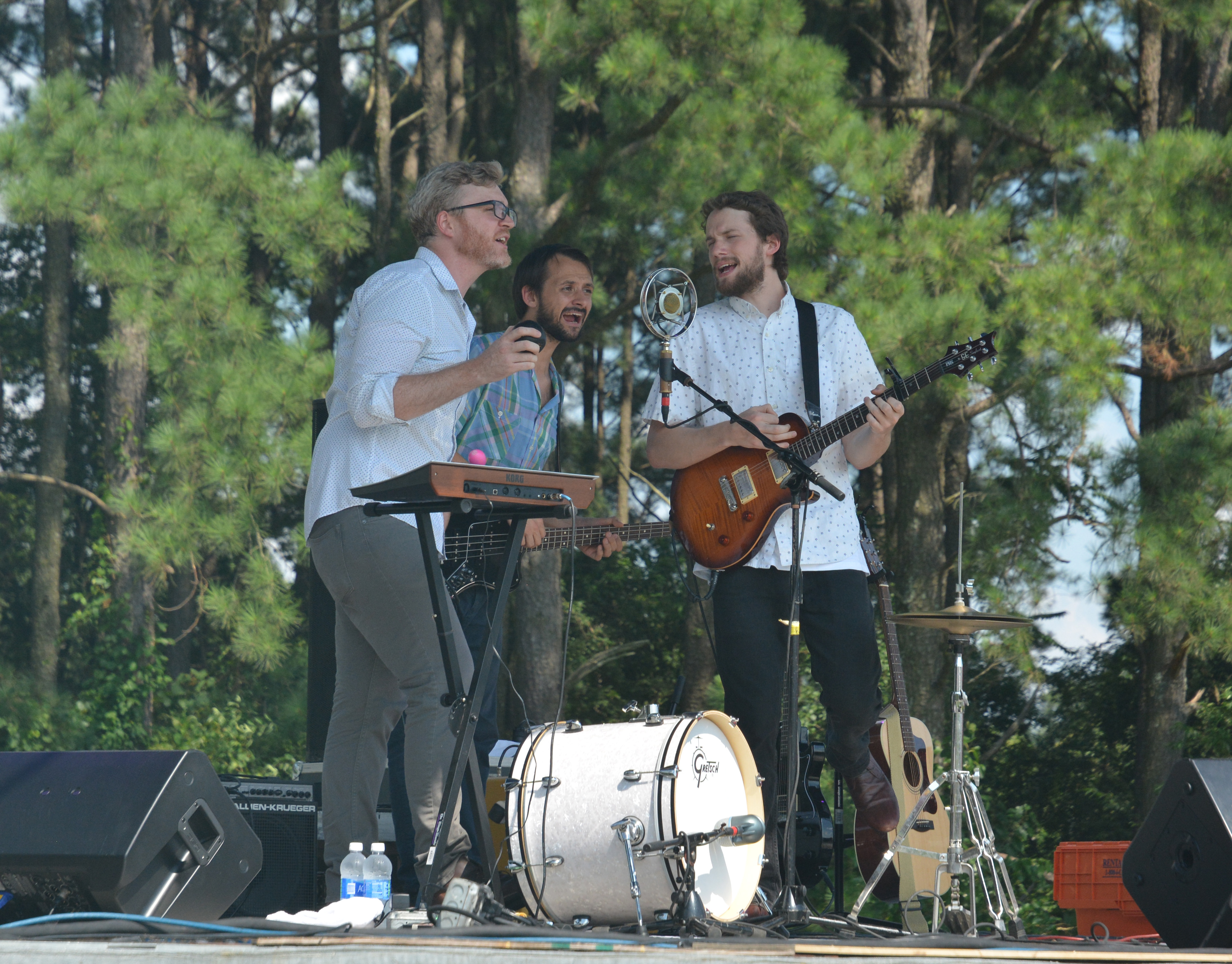
- Bombadil performing at the Destination Dix festival in Raleigh, NC

Background information
- Origin: Durham, North Carolina, United States
- Genres: Americana, folk, pop
- Years active: 2005–present
- Label: Ramseur Records
- Members: Daniel Michalak; James Phillips; Madison Rivis
- Past members: Bryan Rahija; John Michalak; Stephen Bennett; Nicholas Vandenberg; Stacy Harden; MK Rodenbough; Stuart Robinson
- Website: www.bombadilmusic.com

Bombadil is a four-piece Americana folk-pop band from Durham, North Carolina with guitar, bass, piano, and drums as their primary instruments. The band is known for their creative and heartfelt lyrics, lush vocal harmonies, thoughtful arrangements, and engaging live show.

== History ==
Bombadil began in early 2005 after guitarist Bryan Rahija and bassist Daniel Michalak were studying abroad in Bolivia as students at Duke University. They recorded several demos at an elementary school in La Paz during their spare time.

After returning to the U.S., Michalak recruited his brother John to write drum parts. Pianist and friend Stuart Robinson joined the band a few months later.

After a busy year of touring and writing, Bombadil signed with Ramseur Records of Concord, North Carolina after playing a show with The Avett Brothers at the University of North Carolina at Chapel Hill. The group immediately set out recording a debut EP, which was released in May 2006. John Michalak left the band to pursue medical school and was replaced by James Phillips in the fall of 2007.

The group released their first full-length album entitled A Buzz, A Buzz on April 29, 2008. The band toured throughout the United States, playing festivals like Bonnaroo, FloydFest, Pickathon, and Bristol Rhythm and Roots Reunion to support the album.

Their second album, Tarpits and Canyonlands, was recorded with Scott Solter and released on July 7, 2009. The band went on hiatus from July 2009 to December 2010, due to Daniel suffering from nerve damage in his hands. Stuart Robinson also briefly left the band during this time to pursue academic interests, but later returned.

The band gathered in Portland, Oregon to record a follow-up to Tarpits and Canyonlands in November 2010. The album was recorded by drummer James Phillips in a barn on Pendarvis Farm (the same barn where The Decemberists recorded The King is Dead). The album, released on November 8, 2011, is named All That the Rain Promises.

In the summer of 2011, the four members moved back to Durham to record Metrics of Affection, which was released on July 25, 2014. After recording Metrics of Affection, Bryan Rahija left the band to attend business school at the University of Michigan Ross School of Business.

In Rahija's absence, the other members recorded Hold On, their 5th full-length album. The album was released on March 24, 2015. "Amy's Friend," a song from the album, was used on the soundtrack to the movie Trainwreck. On March 4, 2015, it was announced that Stuart Robinson would be leaving the band to pursue personal interests, and Daniel and James would continue writing and touring as Bombadil.

During September 2016, the band, with new member Stacy Harden, recorded Fences, their 6th full-length album, with producer John Vanderslice in San Francisco. Bryan Rahija contributed guitar tracks. The album was released on March 3, 2017. The band released their 7th full-length album Beautiful Country in September 2019 but were unable to tour in support of the album due to the COVID-19 pandemic. After taking 2020 and 2021 off, Bombadil took to social media to announce their return to touring with guitarist MK Rodenbough, known individually as Rodes Baby, on guitar in Harden's stead. It was initially announced that founding member Stuart Robinson would join the band as an opening act for their first show back, but he ended up joining them for the majority of the spring 2022 tour, and as of fall 2022 appears to be back as a full touring member.

== Personnel ==
=== Current members ===
- Daniel Michalak (vocals, bass, piano, guitar)
- James Phillips (vocals, drums, synth)
- Madison Rivis (vocals)

=== Past members ===
- Bryan Rahija (guitar)
- John Michalak (drums)
- Stephen Bennett (drums)
- Nicholas Vandenberg (vocals, guitar, bass, piano)
- Stacy Harden (vocals, guitar, bass)
- MK Rodenbough (vocals, guitar)
- Stuart Robinson (vocals, piano, ukulele)

== Discography ==
=== Full-length albums ===
- A Buzz, a Buzz (April 2008)
- Tarpits and Canyonlands (July 2009)
- All That the Rain Promises (November 2011)
- Metrics of Affection (July 2013)
- Hold On (March 2015)
- Fences (March 2017)
- Beautiful Country (September 2019)
- In Color (2023)
- How the Moon Got Back Home (2025)

=== EPs ===
- Bombadil (May 2006)
- Still Bombadil Issue #1: Score for Cell Phone, Rubber Band & Wine Glass (limited edition EP, March 2015)
- Still Bombadil Issue #2: Attic Guitar Nocturnes No. 2-9 (Demos 2014-2015) (August 2020)

=== 7-inches ===
- Thank You (limited edition 7-inch, June 2012)

=== Singles ===
- "Sad Birthday" (June 2014)
- "Sunny December"
- "A Question"
- "Coughing on the F Train"
