= Mk Ultra (California band) =

American alternative band

Mk Ultra was an American alternative band that played between 1994 and 1999. They took their name from the CIA experiment MKUltra.

== History ==
Mk Ultra formed in the Bay Area in the early nineties and went on to become a hit in local circles. The band broke up soon after their first album release but was reformed by John Vanderslice with a new lineup. Mk Ultra's career culminated in a national tour in 1999 but came to a rapid end when guitarist John Tyner decided to leave. The other members, already working on side projects, did not wish to find a replacement.

Writing in the Charlotte Observer Lindsay Planer called them art rock saying they have "music that recalls the intelligence of the early '80's Roxy Music, combined with the typically edgy angular ostinato of early Police (not to be confused with "Every Breath You Take"). Couple that with the sagacious Wit of Ray Davies' of The Kinks and you have the band in question." Brian Watts of the Daily Utah Chronicle wrote of a live performance "MK Ultra held the crowd's attention by the sheer bizarreness that is their music. Every musician seemed to be in their own musical world, attempting to blend their individual lines into some sort of cohesive final product."

Ink Blot Magazine's Jess Fahnestock said of their debut album "They play with familiar sounds - choppy funk guitars, ramshackle rhythms, bursts of noisy rock - but they don't build familiar shapes with them."

Mk Ultra falsely claimed that their album Original Motion Picture Soundtrack was created for a unrealized film to be directed by Tommy Borgnine (son of Ernest Borgnine). John Chandler of the Rocket said of that album "the words are lovingly wrapped in completely edible melodies executed with sufficient skill so as not to intrude upon the melodramatic dioramas created by a deft turn of phrase."

Pitchfork's Nick Mirov gave their next album a rating of 9.2. He writes "The Dream is Over is incredibly ambitious, full of passionate songwriting, and at once complex and effortless; in other words, everything that independent music in the '90s should be." Brian Watts of the Daily Utah Chronicle gave it 1 1/2 out of 4. He states "the uninventive melodies become more and more monotone as the album progresses, leaving the listener torn between a desire to hear Vanderslice's unusual themes and the wish that his voice would cease." Alexis Scherl of Ink Blot Magazine called it flawless and said "Sonically, MK Ultra has grown confident enough to embrace simplicity, stripping down the songs to the most vital elements. Yet, the richness of the instrumentation and the interplay between each vocal and guitar line is such that you discover something new to like about each song with each subsequent listen."

Much of Mk Ultra's style has been carried on by John Vanderslice and his new band.

== Members ==
- Dan Carr on bass and backup vocals, became a member of Creeper Lagoon
- Matt Torrey on drums, backup vocals and piano, became a member of Jets to Brazil
- John Tyner, guitar and backup vocals
- John Vanderslice, lead vocals, guitar, and sampling, now a solo artist
- Jon Merker, bass
- Jordan Newhouse, guitar
- Josh Glidden, drums
- Peter Shwonek, bass and vocals

== Discography ==
- Mk Ultra (1993)
- Original Motion Picture Soundtrack (1995)
- The Dream Is Over (1999)
