= Chigliak =

American record label and imprint of Jagjaguwar

- Founded: 2012
- Founder: Justin Vernon
- Country of origin: United States
- Official website: www.chigliak.com

Chigliak is a record label and imprint of Jagjaguwar dedicated to albums that have had limited or non-commercial releases. It was founded in 2012 by Justin Vernon of Bon Iver.

== History ==
Chigliak was named after Northern Exposure character Ed Chigliak, whom Vernon cited as "[his] favorite in the pantheon of characters in the history of the world. [...][H]e's sort of a representation of what we're trying to do at the label: like good music that may not be box office-smashing."

== Artists ==
- 12 Rods
- Amateur Love
- Sarah Siskind

== See also ==
- List of record labels
