= Romanian Names =

Studio album by John Vanderslice
- Released: May 19, 2009
- Genre: Indie rock
- Length: 37:20
- Label: Dead Oceans

John Vanderslice chronology
Emerald City (2007)	Romanian Names (2009)

Professional ratings
Review scores
Source	Rating
Alternative Press	4/5 stars
NME	8/10 stars
Pitchfork Media	link
PopMatters	link
Q Magazine	3/5 stars
The Skinny	link
Stereo Subversion	link

Romanian Names is the seventh album by American singer-songwriter John Vanderslice. It was released in the United States on May 19, 2009.

== Critical praise ==
In a review by NME in May 2009, Laura Snapes said, "Not since Bon Iver's 'For Emma, Forever Ago' has there been such an accomplished album of torch songs...if you can spend a little time with 'Romanian Names' and not feel duly captivated by its sun-kissed longing, West Coast harmonies and occasional krautrock minimalism, your heart's probably made of stone."

== Track listing ==
1. "Tremble and Tear" (2:45)
2. "Fetal Horses" (3:57)
3. "C & O Canal" (3:16)
4. "Too Much Time" (3:29)
5. "D.I.A.L.O." (3:11)
6. "Forest Knolls" (3:54)
7. "Oblivion" (2:05)
8. "Sunken Union Boat" (2:48)
9. "Romanian Names" (1:39)
10. "Carina Constellation" (3:40)
11. "Summer Stock" (2:53)
12. "Hard Times" (3:47)
