= Quruli =

Japanese rock band

- Quruli performing at the Asian Pop Festival in Incheon, South Korea, in 2026; From left to right: Yasuhiro Nozaki (support member), Shigeru Kishida, and Masashi Satō

Background information
- Origin: Kyoto, Japan
- Genre: Alternative rock
- Years active: 1996–present
- Labels: Bad News; Speedstar（1996 - 2024） NOISE McCARTNEY RECORDS（Indie 2024 -）
- Members: Shigeru Kishida; Masashi Satō
- Past members: Nobuyuki Mori; Christopher McGuire; Tasshin Ōmura; Yūji Tanaka; Shōnen Yoshida; Fanfan
- Website: https://www.quruli.net/

Quruli (Japanese: くるり, Hepburn: Kururi) is a Japanese rock band formed in Kyoto in 1996. It has been a duo consisting of original members Shigeru Kishida and Masashi Sato since March 2021. They have been signed to Speedstar Records since 1998 to 2024. In 2003, Quruli were ranked number 74 on a list of the top 100 Japanese pop acts by HMV Japan.

== Career ==
After meeting at "Rock Commune," Ritsumeikan University's music club, Shigeru Kishida, Masashi Satō, and Nobuyuki Mori formed the original three-piece band. The name "Quruli," an onomatopoeic word expressing rotation, was taken from a sign in the Kyoto Municipal Subway. In October 1998, Quruli released the single 東京 ("Tokyo") on Victor Entertainment's Speedstar Records. They released their first major label album, さよならストレンジャー ("Goodbye Stranger") in 1999.

Quruli released the albums 図鑑 ("Picture Book") in 2000, produced by Jim O'Rourke, and Team Rock in 2001. According to music critic Ian Martin, Picture Book remains one of the most frequently cited influences for Japanese alt-rock bands. During the production of the 2002 album The World is Mine, Quruli added guitarist Tasshin Ōmura to its lineup. In 2002, Mori left the band.

In 2003, after a trip to England, Quruli returned with a single, How to Go, and created the soundtrack for ジョゼと虎と魚たち ("Josee, the Tiger and the Fish"). After working with a number of session drummers, Quruli officially added drummer Christopher McGuire to their lineup in November 2003. In 2004 Quruli released the album アンテナ ("Antenna"). After the tour for the album was completed, McGuire left the group.

2005 saw the release of several Quruli singles along with a new album, Nikki, released in December of that year. At the last day of 2006, Tasshin Ōmura left the band. In 2007 Quruli released a new album, ワルツを踊れ Tanz Walzer ("Dancing the Waltz"), recorded in Vienna with the Ambassade Orchester Wien. They joined forces again in 2008 to put out the live album Philharmonic or die.

Quruli first appeared on television performing 青い空 ("Blue Sky") on NHK. On September 9, 2005, Quruli appeared on the popular "Music Station" program and performed their song, 赤い電車 ("Red Train"). The song was also featured as the theme song to a Keikyu commercial.

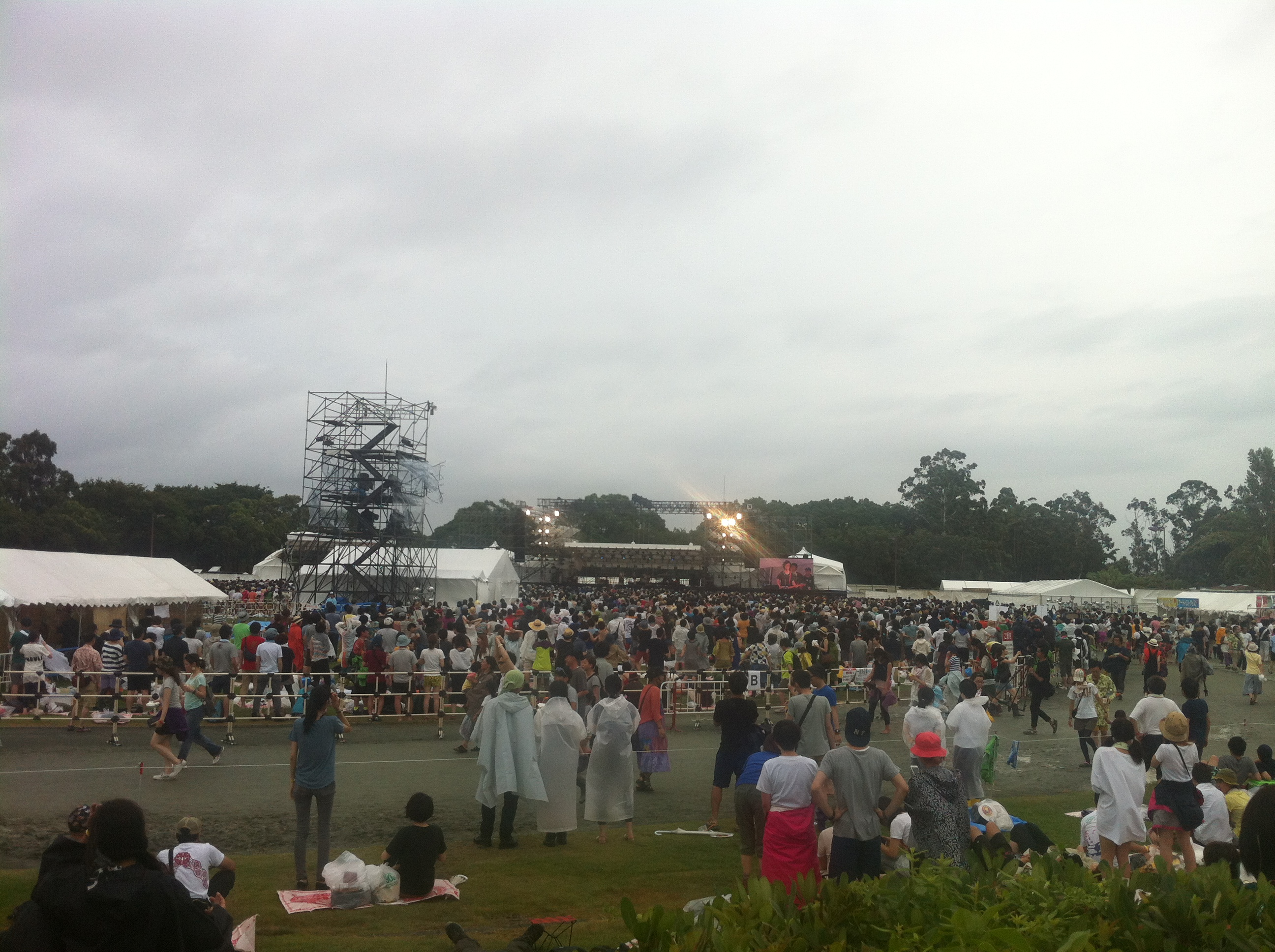
Quruli performing at the World Happiness Festival in 2014

On May 26, 2010, Quruli released the B-side compilation 僕の住んでいた街 ("The Town I Used to Live"), which also included their new song 東京レレレのレ ("Tokyo Le-Le-Le No Le"). The album reached No. 1 on the Oricon weekly album charts, becoming their first No. 1 album on the charts.

On September 8, 2010, Quruli released their album 言葉にならない、笑顔を見せてくれよ ("Show Me Your Indescribable Smile, Please"), including the singles シャツを洗えば ("When I Wash My Shirts") (with Matsutoya Yumi) and 魔法のじゅうたん ("Magical Carpet"). Their songs continued to be used in TIOVITA drink commercials, starting with Jubilee, followed by 太陽のブルース ("The Blues of the Sun"), シャツを洗えば ("When I Wash My Shirts"), 魔法のじゅうたん ("Magical Carpet"), until loveless in 2014. In 2014, those songs were compiled into くるりとチオビタ ("Quruli with TIOVITA").

Quruli released the 10th album 坩堝の電圧 ("Voltage of Melting Pot") in 2012, the 11th album THE PIER in 2014, and the 12th album ソングライン ("Songline") in 2018.

In 2020, Quruli released their 20th album, ”thaw".

After releasing "Love Genius" in April 2021, Quruli entered a new phase in their career, culminating in 4 back-to-back singles in the late summer/early autumn of 2022, and reforming the original trio of Kishida, Sato and Mori in the summer of 2023. In October of that year, a trio album "Driven by Impulse" came out to great acclaim, and a documentary "Quruli Film" was shown in movies nationwide.

Qururi contract with the record company expired in 2024, and since then he has continued to work under his own label.

== Members ==
=== Current members ===
- Shigeru Kishida (岸田繁, Kishida Shigeru) (born April 27, 1976, vocals, electric guitar), was born in Kyoto, and is Quruli's primary songwriter and leader of the band.
- Masashi Satō (佐藤征史, Satō Masashi) (born February 1, 1977, bass guitar, was born in Kameoka, Kyoto. Besides his musical duties, he also serves as the president of Quruli's label, Noise McCartney Records. For most of his career, Satō used a Fender Jazz Bass, but during the recording of Quruli's Antenna album, switched to a Fender Precision Bass.

=== Former members ===
- Nobuyuki Mori (森 信行, Mori Nobuyuki) (born June 20, 1975-, drums) 1996–2002 and 2023
- Christopher McGuire (born November 28, 1975, drums) 2003–2004
- Tasshin Ohmura (大村 達身, Ōmura Tasshin) (born December 17, 1975), electric guitar), is from Hyōgo Prefecture. He uses a Flying-V guitar. It was announced on February 26, 2007, that Ohmura had quit the band.
- Yūji Tanaka (田中 佑司, Tanaka Yūji) (born October 28, 1980-, drums) 2011
- Shōnen Yoshida (吉田 省念, Yoshida Shōnen) (born March 14, 1980-, electric guitar) 2011-2013
- Fanfan (ファンファン, Fanfan) (born February 13, 1985, trumpet, electronic keyboard), was born in Maizuru, Kyoto. 2011–2015,2017-2021 (2015-2017:maternity leave)

=== Supporting musicians ===
- Takefumi Tsujimura (guitar)
- Ahito Inazawa (drum set)
- Taro Dai (drum set, percussion)
- Hirohisa Horie (keyboards, guitar)
- Cliff Almond (drum set)
- Takashi Numazawa (drum set)
- Yuya Kikuchi (drum set)
- Soichiro Yamauchi (guitar)
- Satoshi Mishiba (piano)
- Yuko Araki (drum set)
- Carwyn Ellis (keyboards, guitar, banjo, bouzouki, piano)
- Ren Takada (guitar) (special guest during their Fuji Rock 2011 performance)
- Daiki Matsumoto (guitar) current member
- Shun Ishiwaka (drums, piano) current member
- Yasuhiro Nozaki (keyboards) current member

== Discography ==
=== Albums ===
- もしもし ("Hello?") (indies; November 21, 1997)
- ファンデリア ("Fandelier") (indies; May 15, 1998)
- さよならストレンジャー ("Goodbye Stranger") (April 21, 1999)
- 図鑑 ("Picture Book") (January 21, 2000)
- Team Rock (February 21, 2001)
- The World Is Mine (March 20, 2002)
- ジョゼと虎と魚たち ("Josee, the Tiger and the Fish") (soundtrack; November 5, 2003)
- アンテナ ("Antenna") (March 10, 2004)
- NIKKI (November 23, 2005)
- ベスト オブ くるり -TOWER OF MUSIC LOVER- ("Best Of Quruli - Tower Of Music Lover -") (best album; July 26, 2006)
- ワルツを踊れ Tanz Walzer ("Dancing the Waltz") (June 27, 2007)
- Philharmonic or Die (live album; February 20, 2008)
- 魂のゆくえ ("Fate of the Spirit") (June 6, 2009)
- 僕の住んでいた街 ("The Town I Used to Live") (coupling best album; May 26, 2010)
- 言葉にならない、笑顔を見せてくれよ ("Show Me Your Indescribable Smile, Please") (September 8, 2010)
- ベスト オブ くるり -TOWER OF MUSIC LOVER 2- ("Best Of Quruli - Tower Of Music Lover 2 -") (best album; June 29, 2011)
- 奇跡 ("I Wish") (soundtrack; November 9, 2011)
- 坩堝の電圧 ("Voltage of Melting Pot") (September 19, 2012)
- THE PIER (September 17, 2014)
- くるりとチオビタ ("Quruli with TIOVITA") (compilation album; December 17, 2014)
- 琥珀色の街、上海蟹の朝 ("Amber Colored City, The Morning of The Shanghai Crab") (extended play; July 26, 2016)
- くるりの20回転 ("20 Rotations Quruli has Made") (best album; September 14, 2016)
- ソングライン ("Songline") (September 18, 2018)
- thaw (April 15, 2020)
- 天才の愛 ("Genius Love") (April 28, 2021)

=== Singles ===
- 東京 ("Tokyo") (1998)
- 虹 ("Rainbow") (1999)
- 青い空 ("Blue Sky") (1999)
- 街 ("Town") (1999)
- 春風 ("Spring Wind") (2000)
- ワンダーフォーゲル ("Wandervogel") (2000)
- ばらの花 ("Rose's Flower") (2001)
- リバー ("River") (2001)
- ワールズエンド・スーパーノヴァ ("World's End Supernova") (2002)
- 男の子と女の子 ("Boy and Girl") (2002)
- "How To Go" (2003)
- ハイウェイ ("Highway") (2003)
- ロックンロール ("Rock 'n' Roll") (2004)
- "Birthday" (2005)
- "Superstar" (2005)
- 赤い電車 ("Red Train") (2005)
- "Baby I Love You" (2005)
- "Juice" (feat. Rip Slyme; 2006)
- "Jubilee" (2007)
- 言葉はさんかく こころは四角 ("Words are Triangles, Hearts are Squares") (2007)
- さよならリグレット ("Goodbye Regret") (2008)
- 三日月 ("Crescent Moon") (2009)
- 愉快なピーナッツ ("Pleasant Peanuts") (2009)
- シャツを洗えば ("When I Wash My Shirts") (duet with Matsutōya Yumi; 2009)
- 魔法のじゅうたん/シャツを洗えば（ヴァージョン2） ("Magical Carpet/When I Wash My Shirts (ver.2)") (2010)
- 奇跡 ("Miracle") (2011)
- "everybody feels the same" (2012)
- "Remember Me" (2013)
- 最後のメリークリスマス ("Last Merry Christmas") (2013)
- "There is (always light)/Liberty & Gravity - Special Edition -" (2014)
- ふたつの世界 ("Two Worlds") (2015)
- "How Can I Do?" (included in Live Blu-ray/DVD, くるくる横丁 ("Quru-Quru Alley"); 2017)
- その線は水平線 ("The Line is a Horizon") (2018)
- Sampo (2019)
- Takarasagashi (2022)
- In my pocket (2022)
- August(2022)
- Midsummer (2022)
