= Cheapo =

Music retail chain in Minnesota, US

Inside the "Uptown" Cheapo in Minneapolis, Minnesota

Cheapo Discs is a music retail chain with three locations in Minnesota where customers can purchase new and used compact discs, DVDs, and, at some locations, cassettes and vinyl records. The stores' trademark is a vast selection of new, used, and local music at competitive prices. While the stores generally focus on popular music of numerous types, the locations in St. Paul and Minneapolis also feature jazz and classical music. The Minnesota locations have "the world’s largest selection of Minnesota and North Dakota music." Used discs purchased by Cheapo first go into unsorted racks—one for each day of the week—before being sorted and placed into the general collection. There are usually a few listening stations for trying out discs. Stores may also feature an area of "top ten" selections for a regional radio station. Around 2004, ads called the company "the last authentic music store."

== Locations ==
- Minneapolis - The flagship store is located 2600 Nicollet Ave, Minneapolis. It sells CDs, DVDs, vinyl records and cassette tapes. Popular music is sorted into a large number of genres (modern rock, punk rock, metal, classic rock, avant garde, etc.) unlike many music stores which file a wide range of genres under "pop".
- St. Paul - Located in the Snelling-Hamline neighborhood. All St. Paul Cheapo stores were combined into one building at 71 Snelling Ave N.
- Blaine - A new Cheapo location opened on June 10, 2009. This replaced the Fridley store.
