= Time Travel Is Lonely =

Studio album by John Vanderslice
- Released: June 12, 2001
- Recorded: 2000
- Genre: Indie rock
- Length: 34:17
- Label: Barsuk

John Vanderslice chronology
Mass Suicide Occult Figurines (2000)	Time Travel Is Lonely (2001)	Life and Death of an American Fourtracker (2002)

Professional ratings
Review scores
Source	Rating
Allmusic	4/5 stars
Pitchfork	(8.0/10)

Time Travel Is Lonely is the second album by John Vanderslice, released in 2001. Time Travel Is Lonely is a concept album about Vanderslice's fictional brother Jesse Vanderslice as he slowly succumbs to polar madness while living in Antarctica.

In the track "Do You Remember," Vanderslice imagines different possible outcomes for the famous Chinese rebel who held back tanks while protesting for Democracy at Tiananmen Square.

The song "Interlude 2" is based on the 1st Prelude in C from Bach's Well Tempered Clavier.

== Track listing ==
1. "You Were My Fiji"
2. "Keep the Dream Alive"
3. "Little Boy Lost"
4. "Interlude 1"
5. "Everything Changed"
6. "My Old Flame"
7. "Interlude 3"
8. "Time Travel Is Lonely"
9. "If I Live or If I Die"
10. "Emma Pearl"
11. "Interlude 2"
12. "Do You Remember"
13. "Gainesville, Fla"
