= Appetite for Destruction (Ruby Isle album) =

Studio album by Ruby Isle
- Released: December 7, 2010
- Label: Kindercore

Ruby Isle chronology
Night Shot – The Remixes (2009)	Appetite for Destruction (2010)

Mark Mallman chronology
Do You Feel Like Breaking Up? (2010)	Appetite for Destruction (2010)	Double Silhouette (2012)

Appetite for Destruction is a 2010 album by Ruby Isle. It is a cover of Guns N' Roses' 1987 album of the same name. It was released through iTunes on December 2, 2010. It was scheduled for a CD release with a release party scheduled for January 29, 2011, but on January 11, 2011 it was announced that it was being pulled from all music stores and online music outlets. It was announced on Mark Mallman's Facebook page December 31, 2014 that all legal issues had been resolved and the album is now available on Spotify

== Track listing ==
1. "Welcome to the Jungle"
2. "It's So Easy"
3. "Nightrain"
4. "Out ta Get Me"
5. "Mr. Brownstone"
6. "Paradise City"
7. "My Michelle"
8. "Think About You"
9. "Sweet Child o' Mine"
10. "You're Crazy"
11. "Anything Goes"
12. "Rocket Queen"
