= Name of Romania =

The name of Romania (România) comes from the Romanian Român, which is a derivative of the Latin adjective Romanus (Roman). Romanians are a people living in Eastern Europe speaking a Romance language.

== Etymology of the ethnonym Romanian (român) ==
During the transition from Vulgar Latin to Romanian, there were some phonetical changes that modified romanus into român or rumân. The accusative form romanum was retained.

- ending "-m" dropped (occurred in all Romance languages)
- ending "-u" dropped (regular change; in Old Romanian was however still present)
- "a" → "â" (regular change; vowels before nasal stops turned into "â"/"î")
- "o" → "u" (regular change; however, in some regions of Romania, the variant with "o" was kept)

A reference to the name ''Romanian'' could be contained in the Nibelungenlied (written between 1180 and 1210), where a "Duke Ramunc of Walachia,/with seven hundred vassals, galloped up before her/like flying wild birds men saw them ride". It is argued that "Ramunc" could describe a symbolic figure, representing Romanians. In a document issued about the same period (1190 ?) by King Béla III of Hungary, a count Narad was mentioned as having fought the fury of the "Bulgarorum et Rume⟨n⟩orum" . Hungarian historian Imre Nagy believed Rumeorum to be a mistranscription of Rumenorum, which would be in reference to Romanians in the then recent uprising of the Bulgarians and Vlachs. However, the idea that Rumeorum refers to Romanians is disputed; Hungarian historian Imre Szentpétery, who co-edited the charter with Nagy, believed Rumeorum to be a mistranscription of Ruthenorum "Ruthenes", while Romanian historian Alexandru Madgearu believes this passage to be referring to harassment by the Byzantines (Romei) to a Hungarian army in the Theme of Bulgaria en route to the Holy Land in the Third Crusade.

In the Renaissance Romanians begin to be mentioned in journey and political reports, providing information about the name they give themselves, about their language, customs and the countries they inhabit. The self-designation of Romanians as Romans is mentioned in some 30 scholarly works as early as the 16th century by mainly Italian humanists travelling in Transylvania, Moldavia and Walachia. Thus, Tranquillo Andronico writes in 1534 that Romanians (Valachi) "now call themselves Romans". In 1532, Francesco della Valle accompanying Governor Aloisio Gritti to Transylvania, Walachia and Moldavia notes that Romanians preserved the name of the Romans (Romani) and "they call themselves in their language Romanians (Romei)". He even cites the sentence "Sti Rominest ?" ("do you speak Romanian ?" for originally Romanian "știi românește ?") Further, this author reports what he could learn from local orthodox monks, that "in the present they call themselves Romanians (Romei)" . Reporting his mission in Transylvania, the Neapolitan Jesuit Ferrante Capeci writes around 1575 that the inhabitants of those Provinces call themselves "Romanians" ("romanesci"), while Pierre Lescalopier, relating his voyage from Venice to Constantinople, notes in 1574 that those inhabiting Walachia, Moldavia and the most part of Transylvania say to be descendants of the Romans, calling their language "romanechte" (French transcription for Romanian românește - Romanian). The Italian Dalmatian historian Johannes Lucius writes in 1666: "But the to-day Walachians, whatever Walachian language they speak, don't call themselves Wlachians or Walachians but Romanians and they boast their origin from the Romans and acknowledge to speak the Roman language".

Other first-hand evidence about the name Romanians used to call themselves comes from authors having lived in Transylvania and/or Romanian principalities: the learned Lutheran preacher and first Transylvanian Saxon historiograph Johann Lebel attests in 1542 that common Romanians call themselves "Romuini", the Polish Humanist Stanislaus Orichovius notes as late as 1554 that "these left behind Dacians in their own language are called Romini, after the Romans, and Walachi in Polish, after the Italians". Another humanist, who took up residence in Transylvania as a bishop of Alba Iulia, the Dalmatian Antonius Verantio, who later would become cardinal and viceroy of Habsburg Hungary, also states in 1570 that "the Wallachians call themselves Romans" and provides an example: "When they ask somebody whether they can speak Wallachian, they say: do you speak Roman? and [when they ask] whether one is Wallachian they say: are you Roman?" while the Jesuit Theology professor Martinus Szent-Ivany cites in 1699 Romanian expressions: "Sie noi sentem Rumeni" (modern standard Romanian "Și noi suntem români") and "Noi sentem di sange Rumena" (in modern standard Romanian "Noi suntem de sânge român") The geographer Anton Friedrich Büsching writes in 1754 that "the Wallachians, who are remnant and progeny of the old Roman colonies thus call themselves Romanians, which means Romans" The Hungarian writer András Dugonics in 1801 states: "But those Romans who remained in Dacia mixed their Roman language with the language of the Sarmatians [of the Slavs] and that of the Dacians. Thus a special language was formed, the Wallachian language (oláh nyelv), which is nothing else but a mixture of the Latin language with the Slavic and Dacian language (dákus), and they themselves are today called the Romans (rómaiak), ie rumun" the English author John Paget, in 1839, in his book, "Hungary and Transylvania" writes: ""the Wallack of the present day calls himself "Rumunyi" and retains a traditional pride of ancestry, in spite of his present degradation."

Historical Romanian documents display two variants of "Romanian": "român" and "rumân". For centuries, both spelling forms are interchangeably used, sometimes in the same phrase. Historically, the variant rumân was preferred in Wallachia and Transylvania, with român only common in Moldavia. This distinction was preserved in local dialects even by the mid-20th century: rumân was the preferred form in Transylvania and Oltenia, while român was used in northern and eastern parts of Western Moldavia. Both variant were attested in contact zones such as Bukovina and southern Moldavia, as well as in most of Muntenia; the later occurrence may either be an old phenomenon insufficiently attested in older documents, or it may be a more recent innovation due to the cultural influence of standard Romanian.

In the 17th century, the term "Romanian" also appears as Rumun (Johann Tröster), Rumuny (Paul Kovács de Lisznyai), Rumuin (Laurentius Toppeltinus), and Rumen (Johannes Lucius and Martin Szentiványi).

In the Middle Ages the ethno-linguistical designation rumân/român also denoted common people. During the 17th century, as serfdom becomes a widespread institution, common people increasingly turns into bondsman. In a process of semantic differentiation in 17th-18th centuries the form rumân, presumably usual among lower classes, got merely the meaning of bondsman, while the form "român" kept an ethno-linguistic meaning. After the abolition of the serfage by Prince Constantine Mavrocordato in 1746, the form "rumân" gradually disappears and the spelling definitively stabilises to the form "român", "românesc".

== Etymology of Romania (România) ==
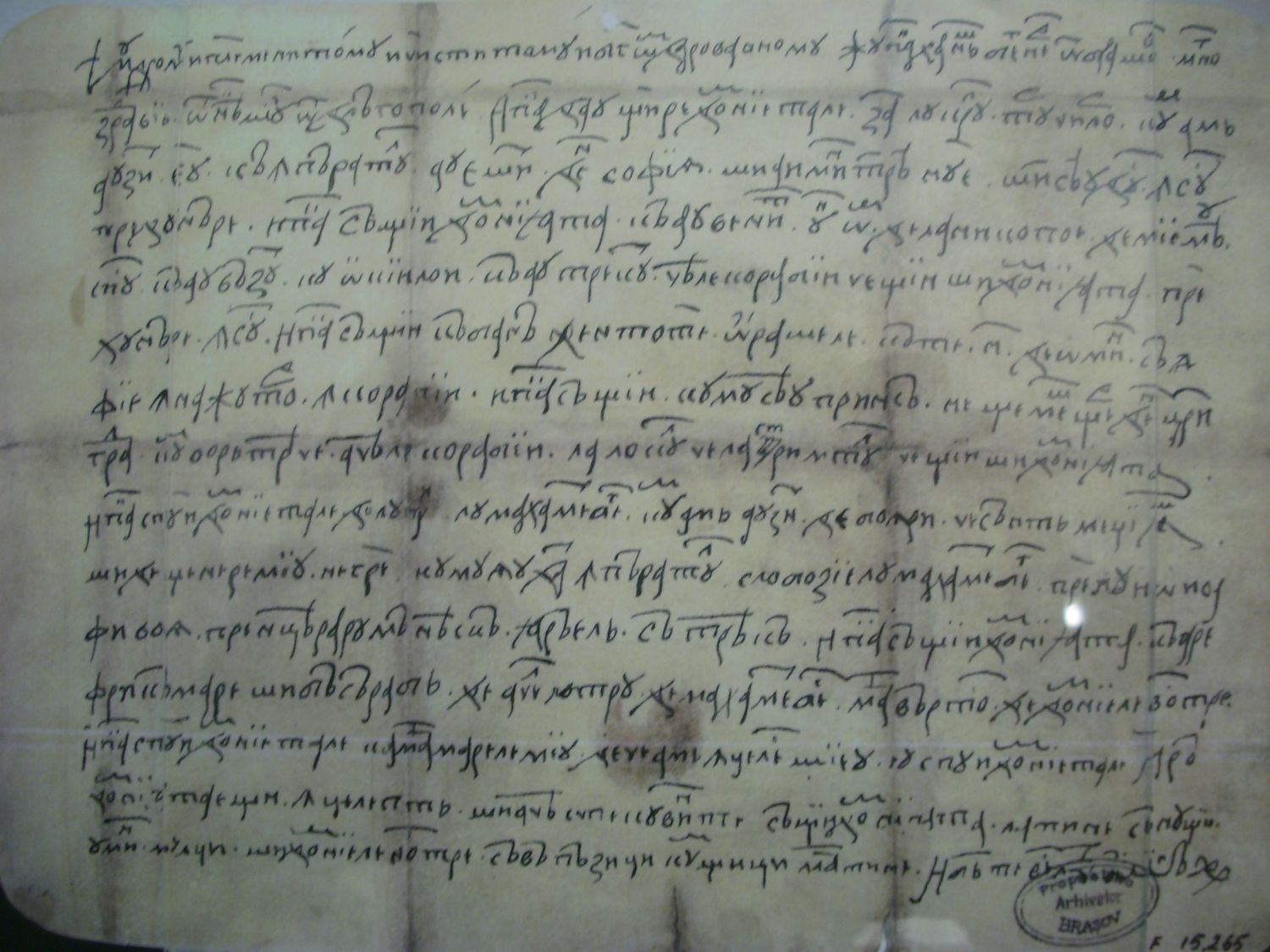
Neacșu's Letter, the oldest surviving document written in Romanian has the oldest appearance of the word "Rumanian"

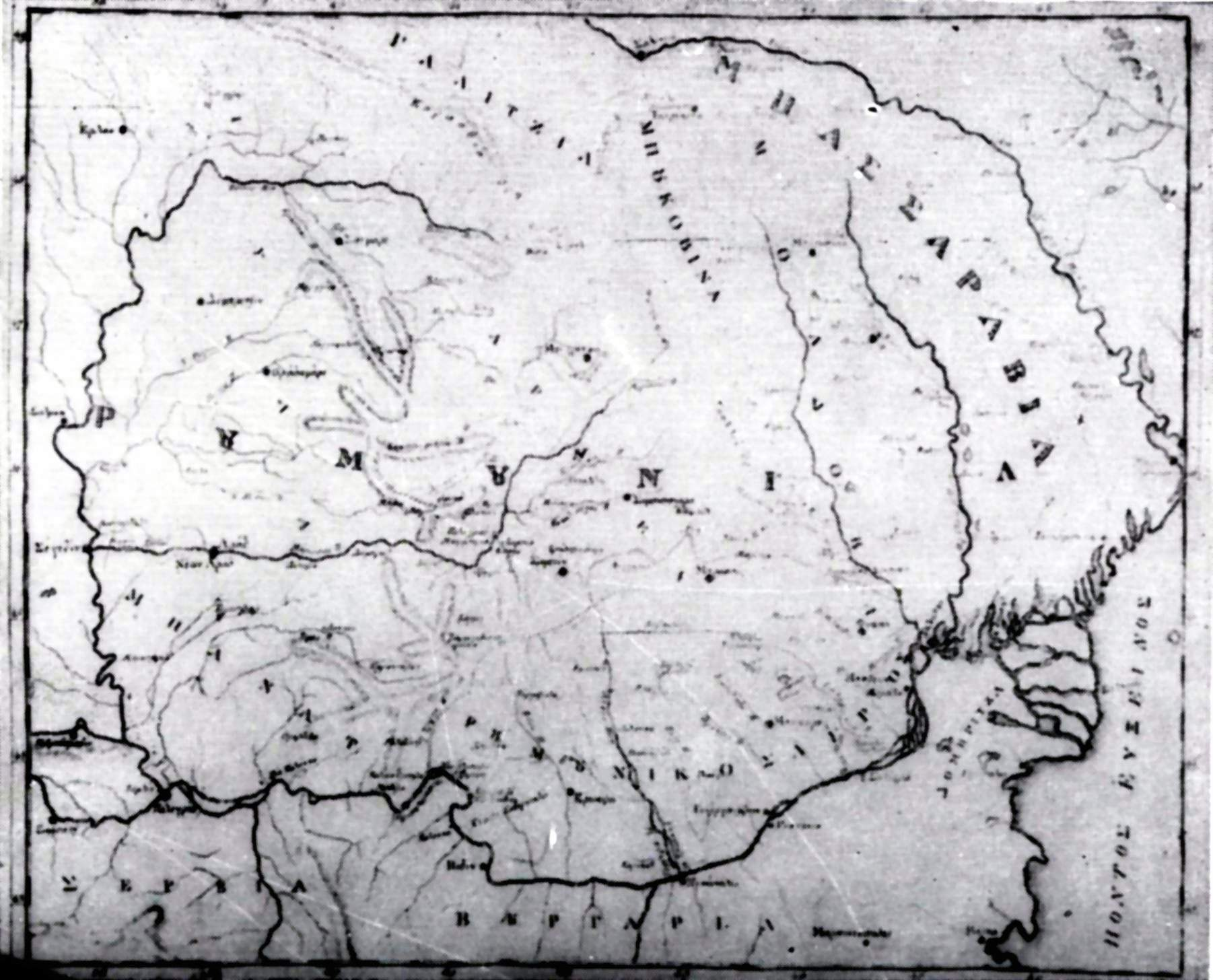
The first map of Romania (Greek: Rumunia) published in Geograficon tis Rumunias, Leipzig, 1816. Author: Dimitrie Daniil Philippide

The earliest preserved document written in the Romanian language is a 1521 letter that notifies the mayor of Brașov about an imminent attack by the Turks. This document, known as Neacșu's Letter, is also notable for having the first occurrence of "Romanian" in a Romanian text, Wallachia being called here the Romanian Land—Țeara Rumânească (Țeara < Latin Terra = land). As in the case of the ethnonym "român/rumân", Romanian documents use both forms, Țara Românească and Țara Rumânească, for the country name, though the first version was preferred in Wallachia.

A common Romanian area called The Romanian Land and embracing Wallachia, Moldavia and Transylvania is mentioned by the chronicler Miron Costin in the 17th century.

In the first half of the 18th century the erudite prince Dimitrie Cantemir systematically used the name Țara Românească for designating all three Principalities inhabited by Romanians.

Ioan-Aurel Pop argued the name "Romania" isn't but a version of the name "Romanian Land", just as in England - Anglia, or Scotland - Scotia.

The etymology of "România" didn't follow the Romanian pattern of word formation for country names, which usually adds the suffix "-ia" to the ethnonym by keeping its accent, like in "grec" → "Grecia", "Bulgar" → "Bulgaria", "rus → "Rusia", etc. Since it is a self-designation, the word "România" has an older history, coming from "românie" which in turn resulted as a derivation of the word "român" by adding the suffix "-ie" with an accented last syllable, like in ""moș → moșie", "domn" → "domnie" or "boier" → "boierie" (lord → lordship). Initially, "românie" may indeed have meant "Romanianship" (just like "rumânie" meant "serfdom" before disappearing), as suggested by Nicolae Iorga's theory of the "Romaniae", i.e. self-organized communities of romanophone peasants all across medieval Europe.

The name "România" as common homeland of the Romanians is first documented in the early 19th century.

The name "Romania" (România) was first brought to Paris by young Romanian intellectuals in the 1840s, where it was spelled "Roumanie" in order to differentiate Romanians (fr.: Roumains) from Romans (fr.: Romains). The French spelling version (Roumanie) spread then over many countries, such as Britain, Spain, Italy, Germany.

In English, the name of the country was originally borrowed from French "Roumania" (<"Roumanie"), then evolved into "Rumania", but progressively fell out of use after World War II in favour of the name used officially: "Romania". The "u" form saw use in English-language material at least as late as 2009. With a few exceptions such as English and Hungarian ("Románia"), in most languages the "u" form is still used (German and Swedish: Rumänien; Bulgarian: Румъния; Serbian: Румунија / Rumunija, Polish: Rumunia, etc.). In Portuguese, to distinguish them from the Romans, the Romanians are called romenos and their country Romênia or Roménia.

== Spelling reforms ==
After the Communist seizure of power, a spelling reform simplified the Romanian alphabet substituting î for â. The name of the country became officially Republica Populară Romînă. Soon an exception was made to allow â for român and its derivations, while î kept used elsewhere. Since, and even after the post-Communist spelling reform, român is spelled with a.

== Other uses of Romania and other derivatives of Romanus ==
- Since 7th century, name for region surrounding Ravenna (Romagna in Italian) where the Byzantines kept off the Germanic rulers.
- The Eastern Roman, or Byzantine, Empire was known during the Middle Ages as the Roman Empire, or more commonly Romania (Ρωμανία in Greek; compare with the modern name Ρουμανία "Roumanía" for Romania). In Western Europe for political and linguistic reasons the Empire came to be referred to as the Greek Empire and eventually the Byzantine Empire. The Greek-speaking Ottoman Christians continued to refer to themselves as Romans (Ρωμαίοι "Romaioi", also the origin of the first name Romeo) long after being absorbed by the Ottoman Empire, only adopting the Greek identity in the 19th century. In the Arabic and Ottoman Turkish languages, Romania came to mean further Eastward regions of the empire, like Rûm in Asia and Rumelia in the Balkans. Rumi was also an Arabic word for Christian.
- It has been an alternative name for the Latin Empire, centred on Byzantium, set up by Roman Catholic Crusaders of the Fourth Crusade with the intention of replacing the Eastern Orthodox Byzantine Empire with a Roman Catholic empire.
- In Romance linguistics it designates all Romance linguistic areas.
- The word Romanus is also kept elsewhere in other parts of the Roman Empire in the name of the Romansh language of Switzerland.
- In the Balkans there are Romanic people that have an ethnonym derived from "Romanus", including Aromanians (armâni, arumâni or rămăni) and Istro-Romanians (rumâri). The Megleno-Romanians originally used the form rămâni, but it was not used until the 19th century and used the word Vlași borrowed from Bulgarian.

== See also ==
- Origin of the Romanians
- History of Romania
- Romanians, Vlachs
- Names of the Aromanians
