= John Vanderslice =

American musician (born 1967)

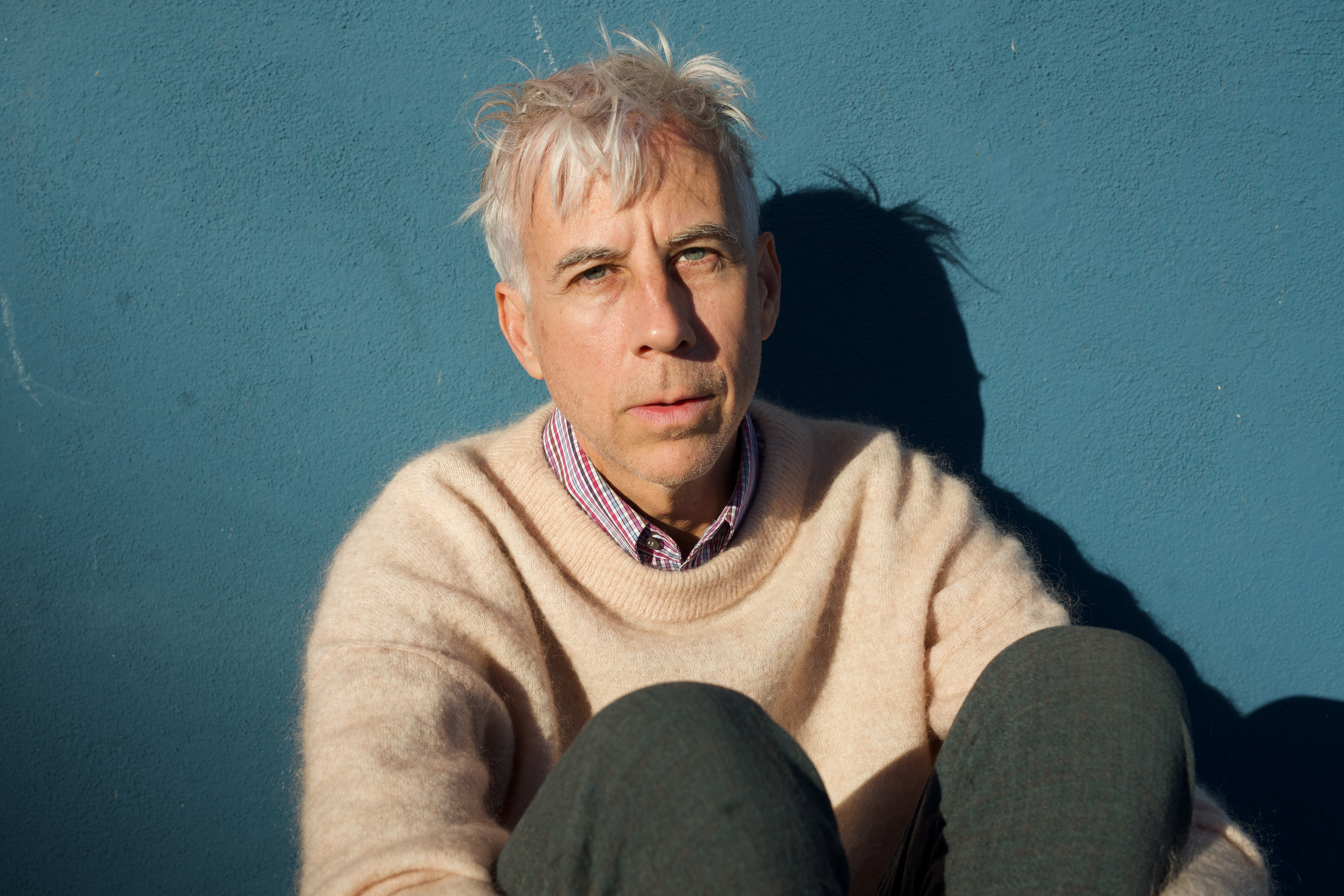
- Vanderslice in November 2022

Background information
- Born: John Warren Vanderslice; May 22, 1967 (age 59); Gainesville, Florida, U.S.
- Origin: San Francisco, California, U.S.
- Genres: Experimental; electronic; indie rock
- Occupations: Musician; record producer; recording engineer
- Instruments: Vocals; guitar; keyboards
- Years active: 1999–present
- Labels: Dead Oceans; Barsuk; The Native Sound
- Formerly of: Mk Ultra
- Spouse(s): Maria Vanderslice (m, 2024)
- Website: johnvanderslice.com

John Warren Vanderslice (born May 22, 1967) is an American musician, songwriter, record producer, and recording engineer. He is the owner and founder of Tiny Telephone, an analog recording studio in San Francisco and Oakland, California.

Vanderslice has released nineteen full-length studio albums and five remix records and EPs on Dead Oceans and Barsuk Records. He has collaborated with musicians such as the Mountain Goats, St. Vincent, and Spoon.

== Early years ==
Vanderslice grew up in rural North Florida before his family moved to Maryland when he was 11. In 1989, he graduated with a degree in economics from the University of Maryland, where he also studied art history. In 1990, he moved to San Francisco, where he supported himself as a waiter while taking classes at the University of California, Berkeley, with the intention of becoming an English teacher.

Vanderslice spent five years as a member of the experimental band Mk Ultra, with whom he released three albums in the 1990s. The last of these, The Dream Is Over, received a 9.2 rating from Pitchfork.

In 1997, Vanderslice founded Tiny Telephone, a 3,000-square-foot, two-room recording studio in the Mission District of San Francisco. Originally used as a rehearsal space, it was later developed into a full-time, all-analog recording studio. Bands who recorded at Tiny Telephone include Death Cab for Cutie, Sleater-Kinney, Okkervil River, Deerhoof, the Mountain Goats, the Magnetic Fields, Tune-Yards, and Spoon.

The original San Francisco studio closed in 2020, with Vanderslice stating that despite being fully booked year-round, it was no longer financially sustainable. However, the Oakland location of Tiny Telephone, which opened in 2015, remains in operation.

== Solo career ==
In 2000, Vanderslice released his first solo album, Mass Suicide Occult Figurines, gaining brief national media attention for the single "Bill Gates Must Die." He orchestrated a hoax claiming that Microsoft had threatened legal action over the song. In reality, Vanderslice faced manufacturing difficulties due to the album's artwork, which resembled a Windows installation disc, causing at least one manufacturer to hesitate over potential legal repercussions. During the controversy, he was interviewed by Spin, Wired, and the San Francisco Chronicle.

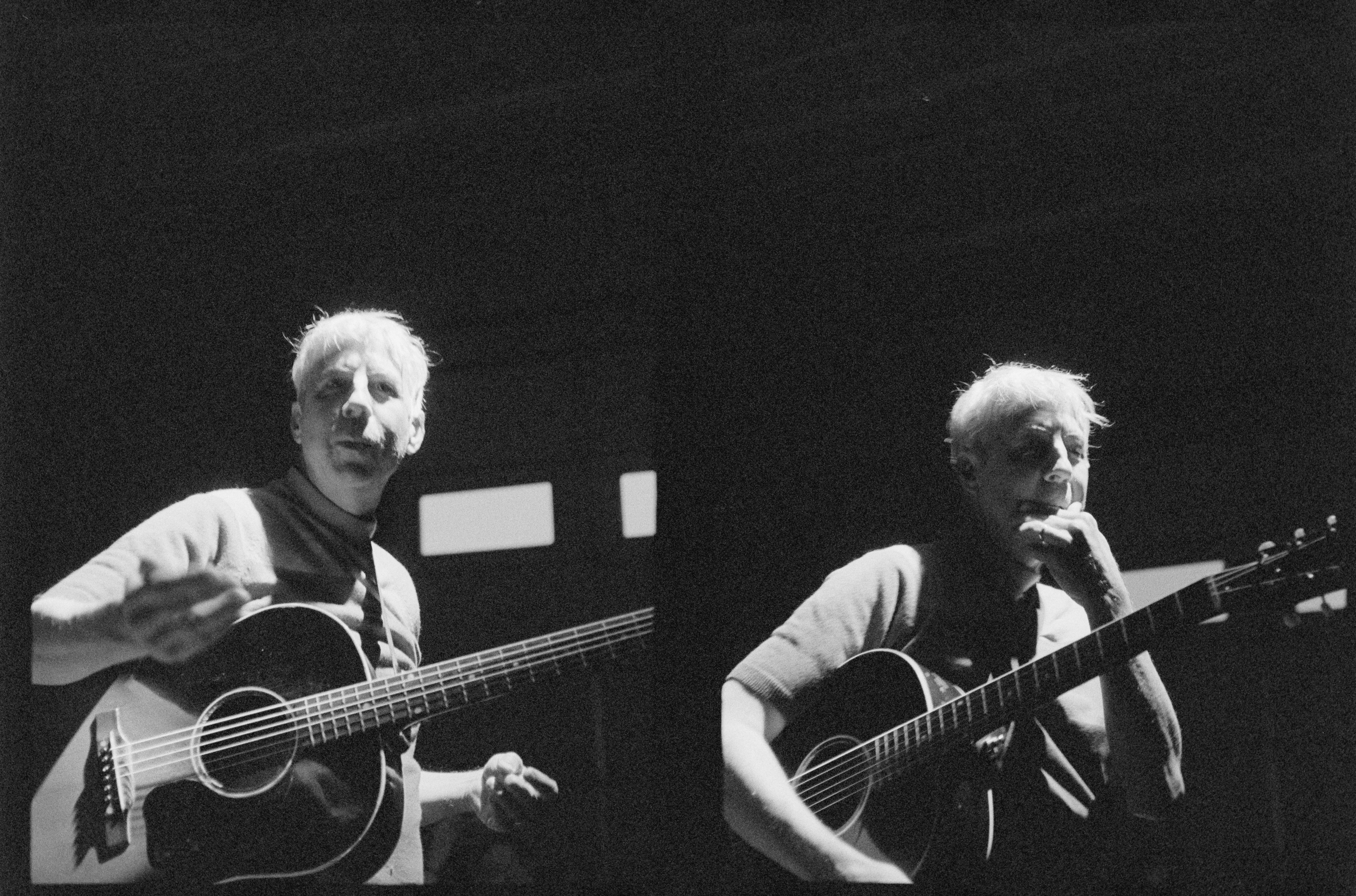
John Vanderslice performing a house show in Dallas, TX (2024)

Time Travel Is Lonely (2001) and Life and Death of an American Fourtracker (2002) followed, with Cellar Door released in 2004.

Many songs on Vanderslice’s 2005 album, Pixel Revolt, referenced the September 11, 2001 attacks and the Iraq War, featuring more overt political themes. Pitchfork awarded the album an 8.3 rating, citing its "meticulous arrangements" and describing it as an "excellent album." The album concludes with a resolution to the narrator’s struggles with acute depression ("Dead Slate Pacific") and suicidal thoughts ("The Golden Gate"), culminating in a love song to psychotropic drugs ("CRC 7173, Affectionately").

The title of Vanderslice's 2007 album, Emerald City, references both the nickname of the fortified Green Zone in Baghdad and the city from The Wizard of Oz. Vanderslice explained: "I was so beaten down after the 2000 election and after 9/11 and then the invasion of Iraq, Afghanistan; I was so depleted as a person after all that stuff happened, that I had to write my way out of it. I really had to write political songs because for me it is a way of making sense and processing what is going on." Emerald City received an 82/100 score on Metacritic. Entertainment Weekly called it "a gleaming gem," while Billboard praised Vanderslice as an "always perceptive lyricist."

With Romanian Names (2009), Vanderslice moved away from overt political themes, shifting toward introspective explorations of romance and humanity’s relationship with nature. Staying true to analog recording, Vanderslice recorded guitar and piano parts in his basement studio before completing production at Tiny Telephone with producer Scott Solter.

In 2010, Vanderslice released a free EP, Green Grow The Rushes.

His 2011 album, White Wilderness, was recorded live in three days at Berkeley’s historic Fantasy Studios in collaboration with Minna Choi and the 19-member MagikMagik Orchestra, Tiny Telephone’s house orchestra. Unlike his previous heavily overdubbed works, Vanderslice adopted a looser, more organic approach, composing acoustic versions while Choi arranged the orchestration. Lyrically, the album reflects on his career and draws inspiration from California landscapes. Songs like "The Piano Lesson" explore childhood musical influences, while "After It Ends" imagines a performer’s dramatic exit. "Convict Lake" recounts a personal experience of overdosing on LSD at the Sierra Nevada lake. The album was produced by John Congleton.

In January 2012, Vanderslice left his record contract with Dead Oceans. He created a Kickstarter campaign to raise funds to start his own label and reached his $18,500 goal within hours of starting the campaign, which ultimately resulted in his ninth album, Dagger Beach.

With Dagger Beach, Vanderslice pushed experimentation with analog production techniques to the forefront of his songwriting. For some songs, including "Harlequin Press" and "Damage Control", he tried to avoid familiar song structures by writing over improvised drum parts played by longtime collaborator Jason Slota. On the album, Vanderslice revisits the theme of navigating the California landscape as a metaphor for personal relationships: "Raw Wood" reflects on solo camping in Wildcat camp of Point Reyes National Park, while "North Coast Rep" describes a disintegrating friendship by way of a found photograph of the Sonoma, California, landscape.

In conjunction with Dagger Beach, Vanderslice released his own full cover version of David Bowie's Diamond Dogs. The idea for the cover album came in August 2012, when Vanderslice performed Diamond Dogs in full at the Vogue Theater in San Francisco, followed by a screening of Michel Gondry's cult classic, The Science of Sleep. After intensive rehearsing for a single show with a limited audience, Vanderslice decided to channel his creative efforts with Bowie's original material into an entire cover version of the album. It was released on limited edition vinyl in June 2013. Using the original album as a backbone to experiment and improvise in the recording studio with collaborators, Vanderslice altered lyrics, song structures, chord progressions, and titles of many of the songs.

With full control of the production and distribution of his self-released albums and a commitment to quality control, Vanderslice had both Dagger Beach and Diamond Dogs pressed on 200-gram vinyl by audiophile Quality Record Pressings plant. In response to widespread music file sharing and in an effort to control sound quality of distributed files, he has made high-quality music files of many self-released songs freely available online.

In an interview with The New Yorker, Vanderslice stated that a near-death experience in 2014, in which the van he was touring in almost flipped on Interstate 80 in Ohio, prompted him to quit touring and making records. Surviving the incident was a life-altering experience: "After that happened, maybe a second later, I was like, I’m done. I don’t want to die in a van. It wasn’t sad, it wasn’t celebratory. It was just like, eh, I had a good run."

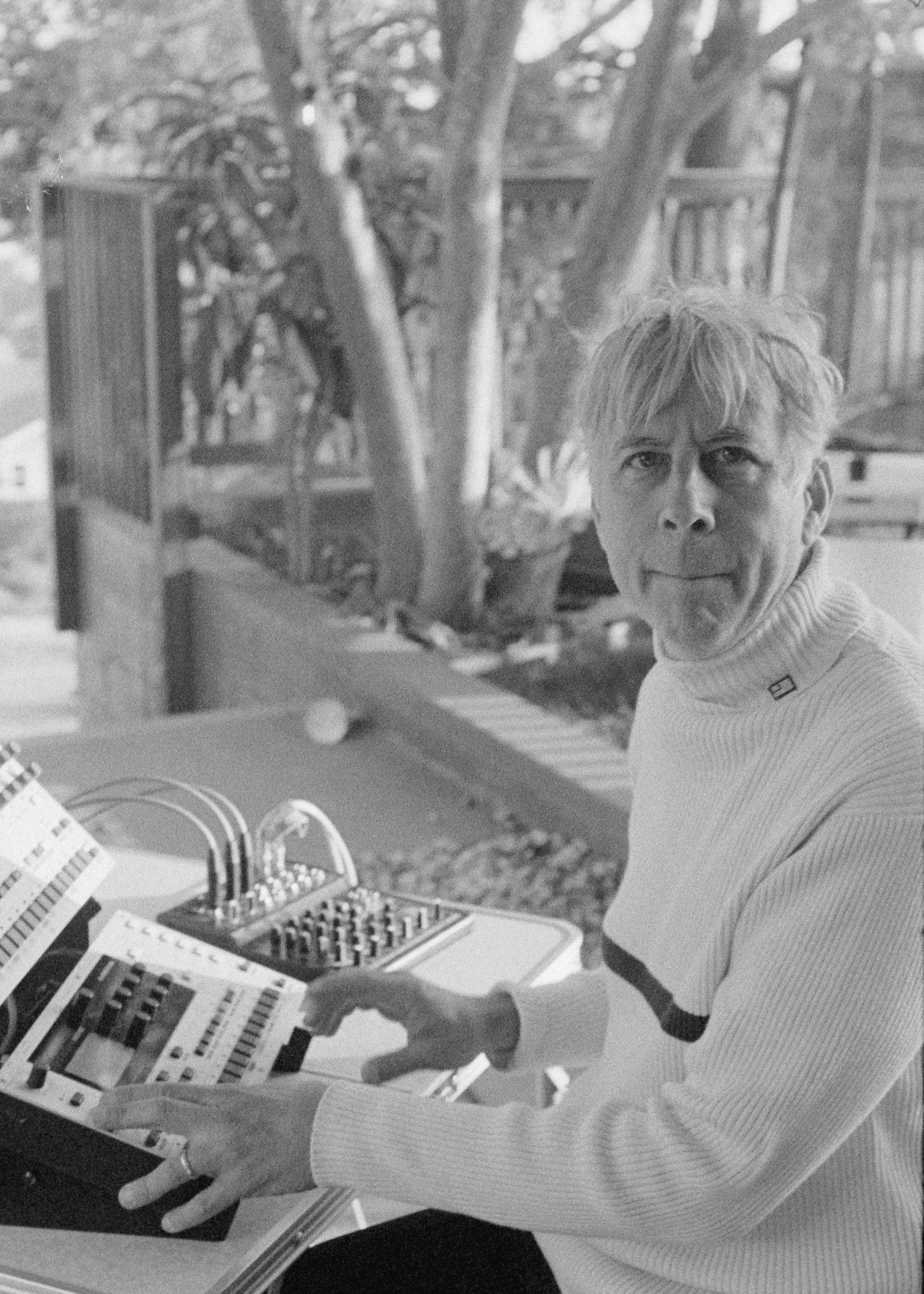
John Vanderslice playing an Elektron Machinedrum and Monomachine.

Vanderslice began touring again in 2018 with Undertow Music, performing a series of house shows. His album The Cedars also released that year would be his last album fully recorded and mixed by analog means of production. His following albums are almost all recorded digitally in his small backyard studio in Los Angeles including Dollar Hits (2020) and d E A T h ~ b U g (2021).

In 2021, Vanderslice self-released his first fully electronic record. CRYSTALS 3.0 is the culmination of a span of experimentation with harsh noise and drugs, curious samples and cascading sequencers. A 19-minute sequence of melodies, meticulous static bursts, and spring-loaded beats, CRYSTALS 3.0 applies Vanderslice's idea about breaking old molds, and avoiding easy interpretation.

Those samples populate CRYSTALS 3.0 like reawakened ghosts, maybe guests of honor at one of the drug parties Vanderslice throws in the backyard with his wife, Maria Vanderslice. The whole dense little record "feels like a distilled fête", its 13 overlapping tracks functioning as fragments from conversations and encounters.

In 2023, Vanderslice began collaborating with James Riotto, producer (Jamie xx, Strand of Oaks, Ezra Furman), long-time friend, and musical partner, under the band name Google Earth. Their first studio album, Street View received an 8.0 from Pitchfork. In the album, John Vanderslice "finds a balance between his headlong embrace of electronic production and his longstanding art-rock inclinations". The record is a collaboration in another sense as well: "Vanderslice’s wife, the artist Maria Vanderslice, wrote four songs". It's the first studio album where John did not write the lyrics himself. Vanderslice and Riotto would embark on hours long jam sessions in Vanderslice's backyard studio, running paired Swedish-made Elektron Monomachines and Machinedrums through MIDI channels, hoping for "happy harmonic accidents". Since the release in 2024, the pair have released another studio album entitled for Mac OS.X 10.11 August 2025.

== Recording technique and collaborations ==
Vanderslice is a proponent of using analog instruments and recording equipment to produce a richer, more raw sound, which he has sometimes called "sloppy hi-fi." He has collaborated closely with engineers and producers in the production of his albums, including John Congleton, Scott Solter, and John Croslin.

Since 2014, Vanderslice has worked as a full-time record producer at Tiny Telephone, collaborating with artists such as Frog Eyes, Samantha Crain, the Mountain Goats, and Grandaddy. He has also previously worked with Sophie Hunger, Bombadil, Strand of Oaks, and Spoon. In recent years, he has shifted away from production work to focus on his own music.

In 2020, Vanderslice largely moved away from analog recording and became an advocate for the creative flexibility offered by digital recording.

Vanderslice was a contributing producer on the Spoon album Gimme Fiction and also produced several albums for the Mountain Goats, including We Shall All Be Healed, The Sunset Tree, and Heretic Pride. In March and April 2009, he toured with the Mountain Goats' John Darnielle on the "Gone Primitive Tour." These shows featured Vanderslice and Darnielle performing acoustic sets before playing together.

Vanderslice has frequently chosen bands to tour with him who later gained widespread recognition and critical acclaim, including Sufjan Stevens, Okkervil River, the Tallest Man on Earth, and St. Vincent.

== Influences and interests ==
Vanderslice is heavily influenced by film and is a fan of David Lynch and Ingmar Bergman. His song "Promising Actress" references the film Mulholland Drive (film), and his 2004 album, Cellar Door, is inspired by and largely written about the 2001 film Donnie Darko.

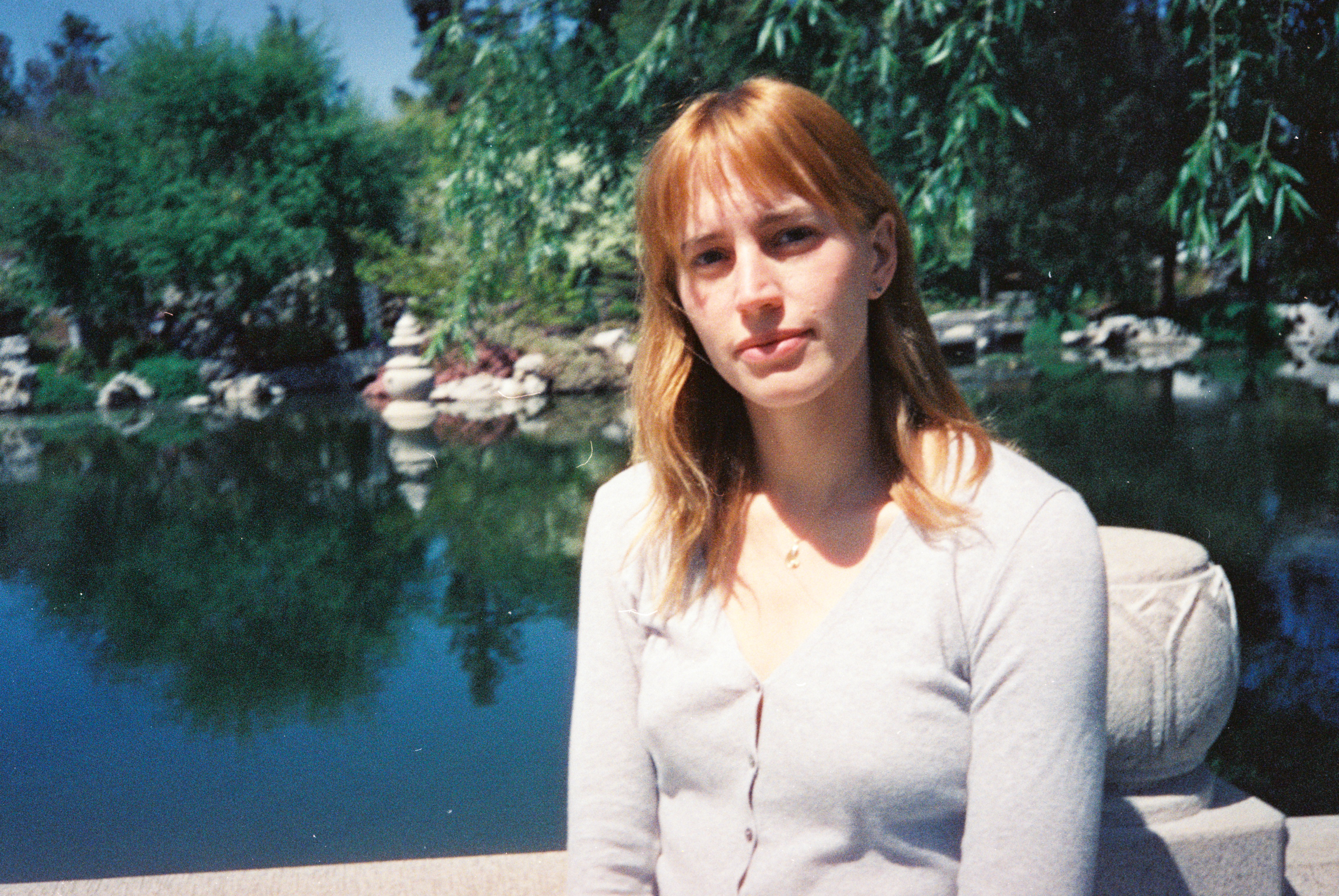
Maria Vanderslice shot by John Vanderslice on a Pentax K1000.

In addition to his music, Vanderslice is a prolific amateur photographer. He has taken publicity photos for Thao Nguyen, the Mountain Goats, Will Sheff of Okkervil River, and Mirah. His work has also been used as album artwork by Matt Nathanson, Carey Mercer of Frog Eyes, and Mobius Band, as well as for his own 2009 release, Romanian Names.

Since shifting away from analog recording in 2020, Vanderslice has radically changed his musical style. He cites his modern influences as Arca, JPEGMafia, Autechre, and Modeselektor.

== Discography ==
=== Albums ===
- Mass Suicide Occult Figurines (2000)
- Time Travel Is Lonely (2001)
- Life and Death of an American Fourtracker (2002)
- Cellar Door (2004)
- Pixel Revolt (2005)
- Emerald City (2007)
- Romanian Names (2009)
- White Wilderness (recorded with the Magik*Magik Orchestra) (2011)
- Dagger Beach (2013)
- Vanderslice Plays Diamond Dogs (2013)
- The Cedars (2019)
- Dollar Hits (2020)
- ETHICAL JUTE MOUSE: Lost Songs from Tiny Telephone 2001–2021 (2021)
- John, I can't believe civilization is still going here in 2021! Congratulations to all of us. Love, DCB (2021)
- d E A T h ~ b U g (2021)
- Released Under Creative Commons 0 (2022)
- CRYSTALS 3.0 (2023)
- Street View (2024) (released as Google Earth)
- for Mac OS.X 10.11 (2025) (released as Google Earth)
- Focus (2026)

=== Remix albums ===
- MGM Endings: Cellar Door Remixes (2004)
- Suddenly It All Went Dark: Pixel Revolt Live to 2-Track (2006)
- Scott Solter Remixes Pixel Revolt in Analog (2007)

=== Singles and EPs ===
- "Bedside recordings vol. 1.2" – 7" (with the Mountain Goats) (2003)
- Moon Colony Bloodbath – EP (with the Mountain Goats) (2009)
- "Too Much Time" – 7" (2009)
- "D.I.A.L.O." – 7" (2010)
- Green Grow the Rushes – (2010)
- "Song For Clay Miller" – Flexi (2013)
- "Midnight Blue" – Flexi (2015)
- Eeeeeeep! (2020)
- Amethyst (2022)
- Montezuma (for Maria) (2024)
- music for running (2025)
