= Gay? =

1996 EP by 12 Rods

EP by 12 Rods
- Released: January 14, 1996
- Genres: Alternative rock; indie rock; dream pop
- Length: 37:47
- Label: V2 Records
- Producer: 12 Rods

12 Rods chronology
Bliss (1993)	Gay? (1996)	Split Personalities (1998)

Gay? is an EP by 12 Rods. It was released on January 14, 1996, by V2 Records.

The EP is notable for being the first recording to receive a very rare 10 rating from Pitchfork upon its release, being one of the few albums to ever have done so.

== Critical reception ==
Professional ratings
Review scores
Source	Rating
AllMusic	3/5 stars
NME	8/10 stars
Pitchfork	10/10

AllMusic wrote that the EP "documents a formative stage in the band's evolution, as the songs here hint at space-country, ambient synth textures, and jazzy, quiet storm-influenced adult contemporary." Simon Williams, writing for the NME, said that the EP "virtually sparkles with wit and spectacular invention."

== Track listing ==
1. "Red" (6:17)
2. "Make-Out Music" (3:51)
3. "Gaymo" (6:09)
4. "Mexico" (6:23)
5. "Friend" (5:34)
6. "Revolute" (9:31)
