= Mark Mallman =

American musician, film composer, and memoirist (born 1973)

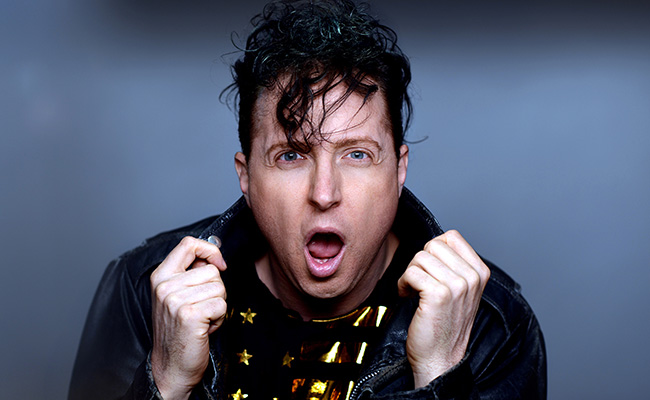
- Mallman in 2016

Background information
- Born: Mark Mallman; July 20, 1973 (age 53); Waukesha, Wisconsin
- Origin: Minnesota
- Instrument: Piano
- Works: Mark Mallman discography
- Labels: Eagles Golden Tooth, Guilt Ridden Pop, Susstones, Badman Recording Company, Kindercore, Polka Dot Mayhem
- Website: MarkMallman.com; Bermuda Music Company

Mark Mallman (born July 20, 1973) is a Minnesota musician, film composer, and memoirist. Since 1998, he has released nine full-length studio albums, Happiness (2021) being his most recent.

== Education ==
Mallman graduated from Waukesha South High School in 1991. He studied jazz piano at the Wisconsin Conservatory of Music then moved to Minneapolis, Minnesota, in 1991. In 1995, at age 21, Mallman earned a Bachelor of Fine Arts from Minneapolis College of Art and Design, where he studied painting and performance art.

== Musical career ==
Mark Mallman has earned a reputation as one of the Twin Cities' must-see live acts, complete with his own star on the wall outside First Avenue. He started his career in the late 1990s with the short-lived band, the Odd, a surprisingly popular postmodern joke on 1970s rock histrionics. Days after they topped the City Pages "Best new Band" poll, they broke up, but reunited in 1998 to record and release one album, Oh My G*d – It's the Odd, which was co-written and co-produced by Mallman. His solo debut came in 1998 with the release of The Tourist. In 2000, Mallman issued his sophomore effort, How I Lost My Life and Lived to Tell about It, which featured guest spots by Kat Bjelland of Babes in Toyland, and Mallman's schoolmate Davey von Bohlen of The Promise Ring. The Red Bedroom, his third album, was issued in Spring 2002. It was produced by Radiohead producer Paul Q. Kolderie. His Who's Gonna Save You Now? EP and Live from First Avenue, Minneapolis album were released in 2003. Mr. Serious, Mallman's first self-produced album, followed in 2004. It marked his first album for Badman Recording Company.

Mallman's energetic performance style, combining the punk rock attitude of Johnny Rotten and Darby Crash with the flambouyance of '70s disco, glam and Elton John, began to gain attention in the U.S. around the time of this record. While performing about 150 shows per year, Mallman recorded and released Between the Devil and Middle C in 2006 and Invincible Criminal in 2009. The latter album featured a duet with Craig Finn of The Hold Steady, and violins by Shannon Frid of Cloud Cult. After extensive U.S. touring, he spent the first half of 2012 in Los Angeles, writing and recording Double Silhouette, released later that year.

On March 25, 2016, Mallman released The End is Not The End. David Bowie's Scary Monsters and Super Creeps helped inspire the direction of the 12-track album, with themes of life after death and constant rebirth on earth. Mallman made the album after his mother died and his subsequently dealing with depression and anxiety attacks. He described the work as "a deliberate meditation on overcoming the roots of despair."

== The Happiness Playlist ==
In the wake of his mother's death and a breakup with a longtime girlfriend, Mallman found himself struggling to listen to music that might trigger or amplify his despair, including previous favorites such as Joy Division. In late 2014, in hopes of changing his mood, he compiled a playlist of 50 feel-good songs and decided to listen to nothing but the playlist for the entire winter. He also began journaling, the results of which eventually morphed into a memoir, The Happiness Playlist: The True Story of Healing My Heart With Feel-Good Music.

The book was published in March 2019 by Think Piece Publishing, which promotes mental health advocacy through the arts. It features a foreword by essayist Chuck Klosterman. More memoir than self-help, the book follows Mallman through his day-to-day life in Minneapolis as he recovers from grief with the help of his new soundtrack. Mallman has stressed that the playlist was just one tool — he also sought out therapy, antidepressants, meditation, and ceased consuming alcohol. "Music is not going to cure you but it is gonna make things better," he said.

IndieReader called it "an uplifting memoir that earns its wings honestly, with humor and perception." Forward Reviews said Mallman's "prose is fueled by short, declarative sentences and a narrative willingness to be emotionally vulnerable." Jim Walsh, author of The Replacements: All Over But the Shouting, called it "wise, funny, and heartfelt."

== Marathon song cycles ==
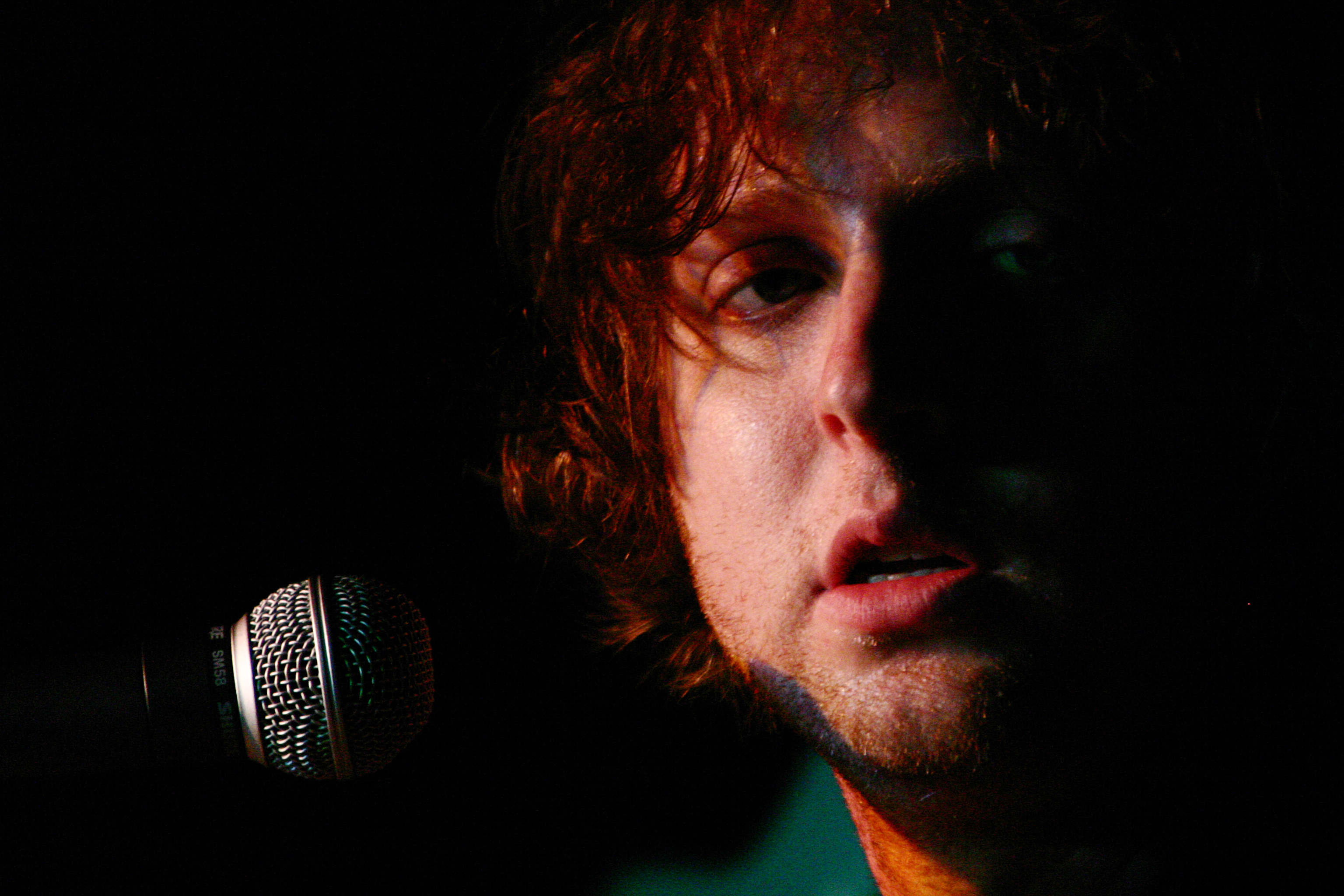
Mallman performing at The Cave at Carleton College in 2004.

In 1999 Mallman performed a 26-hour long song titled "Marathon 1". Later, in 2004, Mallman's "Marathon Two" session took place back at the Turf Club in St. Paul, Minnesota. Seventy-five musicians took turns backing Mallman as he performed one song for over two consecutive days, only breaking to go to the bathroom. On October 10, 2010, he completed "Marathon 3", a 78-hour long song complete with 576 pages of lyrics. During the performance, he injured his left foot. He finished at 10pm on Sunday night by biting into a bouquet of flowers and spitting them over the crowd.

Mayor Chris Coleman declared October 7–10, 2010 "Mark Mallman Days" in St. Paul, Minnesota in honor of his creative achievement. The mayor's proclamation included the statement "Whereas Mark Mallman is totally AWESOME." From September 15 to Sept 22, 2012 he endured "Marathon IV: Road Rogue", an 8-day, 150-hour plus nonstop performance from New York to Los Angeles in the back of a van. Marathon IV: Road Rogue was the first ever intercontinental mobile musical webcast in the history of the Internet. In addition to the pioneering webcast, Mallman also employed a hacked midi brain controller which enabled him to perform music with his brainwaves while he was sleeping.

== Film music ==
Mallman started working on video game music in 2001. That led to working on trailers, starting with the 2007 remake of the thriller The Hitcher. Mallman was a professional composer of major motion picture trailers, such as Adventureland, 10,000 BC and Haunting of Molly Hartley from 2006 - 2009. He has also composed music for Living Arrangements (2009). In 2012, he composed the score for the Lion's Gate / Machinima webseries Bite Me. He currently operates his own music composition company, Bermuda Music, in Minneapolis.

== Discography ==
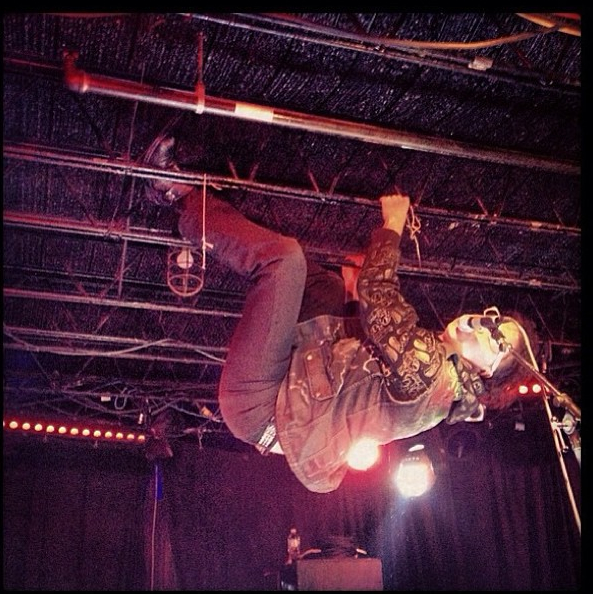
Mark Mallman swinging from the 7th Street Entry rafters in 2012.

Solo discography

- The Tourist, 1998
- How I Lost My Life and Lived to Tell about It, 2000
- Mark Mallman and Vermont, (with Vermont) 2001
- The Red Bedroom, 2002
- Mr. Serious, 2004
- Between the Devil and Middle C, 2006
- Invincible Criminal, 2009
- Double Silhouette, 2012
- The End Is Not The End, 2015
- Happiness, 2021.

The Odd discography

- Oh My G*d - It's the Odd, 1998

Ruby Isle discography

- Night Shot, 2008
- Appetite for Destruction, 2010

== Awards ==
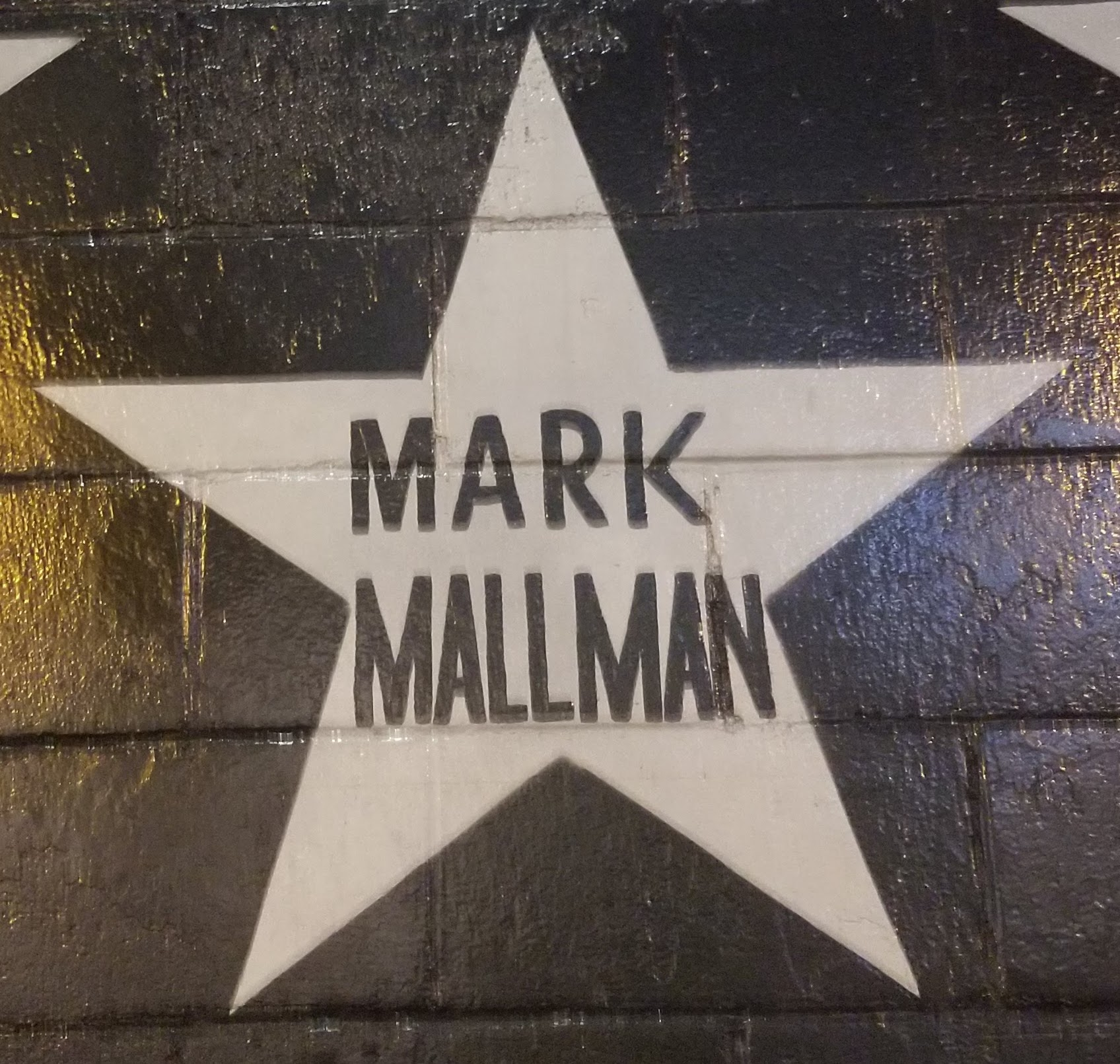
Mallman's star on the outside mural of the Minneapolis nightclub First Avenue

- "Best Male Vocalist Twin Cities" by City Pages (2000)
- Minnesota Music Award for best keyboard/piano player (2004)
- Minnesota Music Award for Rock Band and Rock Record for Mr. Serious (2005)
- "Best Live Artist Twin Cities" by City Pages (2010)
- "Best Music Video Twin Cities" for It's Good To Be Alive by City Pages (2010)

Mallman has been honored with a star on the outside mural of the Minneapolis nightclub First Avenue, recognizing performers that have played sold-out shows or have otherwise demonstrated a major contribution to the culture at the iconic venue. Receiving a star "might be the most prestigious public honor an artist can receive in Minneapolis," according to journalist Steve Marsh.
