= Cellar Door (John Vanderslice album) =

Studio album by John Vanderslice
- Released: January 20, 2004
- Recorded: 2003
- Genre: Indie rock
- Length: 42:02
- Label: Barsuk
- Producer: Scott Solter, John Vanderslice

John Vanderslice chronology
Life and Death of an American Fourtracker (2002)	Cellar Door (2004)	Pixel Revolt (2005)

Professional ratings
Review scores
Source	Rating
AllMusic	4.5/5 stars
Pitchfork Media	7.9/10

Cellar Door is an album by John Vanderslice, released in 2004. The album contains a few songs based on then-recent films: "Promising Actress" is about Mulholland Drive and "When It Hits My Blood" narrates Requiem For A Dream.

== Critical reception ==
The Austin Chronicle wrote that the "rogues' gallery of miscreants and misanthropes dart among simple instrumentation (synth, guitar, drums) as Vanderslice channels their tales." Exclaim! noted that "as the content gets darker, the music grows strangely pretty, with delicate guitar, bells and his distinctive big, weird drum sound."

== Track listing ==
All tracks written by John Vanderslice, except the lyrics for Pale Horse, adapted from Shelley's The Masque of Anarchy.

1. "Pale Horse" – 2:41
2. "Up Above the Sea" – 3:41
3. "Wild Strawberries" – 1:50
4. "They Won't Let Me Run" – 3:52
5. "Heated Pool and Bar" – 4:04
6. "My Family Tree" – 2:24
7. "White Plains" – 4:18
8. "Promising Actress" – 4:29
9. "Coming and Going on Easy Terms" – 4:27
10. "Lunar Landscapes" – 2:50
11. "When It Hits My Blood" – 3:27
12. "June July" – 4:01
