= Wckr Spgt =

American musical group

Wckr Spgt is an American musical band, that formed in 1981 in Claremont, California. With influences that include dadaism and punk rock, they were part of an early movement focused primarily on experimental home recording and cassette culture in the Pomona Valley at that time. The band consists of Joel Huschle, Mark Givens, and Dave Carpenter and, over the years, several guest musicians and artists, notably John Darnielle of The Mountain Goats, Ian Carlson of The Desperation Squad, and the members of Nothing Painted Blue (Franklin Bruno, Kyle Brodie, and Peter Hughes).

Early audio cassettes were distributed throughout the Pomona Valley at local music stores. In the 1990s the record label Shrimper distributed Wckr Spgt recordings including 1997's Everybody's Dead (Oh, No). Their solitary 7-inch EP 'Cream' (1993) came in a limited edition of 450 in a hand-drawn sleeve sprinkled with glitter.

The band's 2017 album, Dense Pack, received a four-star rating from Punknews.org.

== Discography ==
=== Shrimper Records ===
- 5 Years (Aloha) (Shrimper Cassette)
- Drops Of Love (Shrimper Cassette)
- The Charles Mansion (Shrimper Cassette)
- Dance 'Til You Stop (Shrimper Cassette)
- Who Will Die (Shrimper Cassette)
- CRTV (Shrimper Cassette)
- Everybody's Dead (Oh, No) (Shrimper CD)
- Cream (Shrimper 7-inch)

=== JUPA Records ===
- (4 song) EP (JUPA 003)
- Fortune Came Today (JUPA 006)
