= Days (The Mountain Goats album) =

Studio album by the Mountain Goats
- Released: August 7, 2026
- Recorded: 2026
- Studios: Sear Sound (Manhattan, New York)
- Genres: Alternative rock, indie folk
- Label: Cadmean Dawn
- Producer: John Congleton

The Mountain Goats chronology
Through This Fire Across from Peter Balkan (2025)	Days (2026)

Singles from Days
- 1. "Charlie Sheen Reaches Out to the Feds" Released: May 13, 2026

Days is the twenty-fourth studio album by American alternative rock band the Mountain Goats, released on August 7, 2026, through the band's independent label Cadmean Dawn, with marketing and distribution by Thirty Tigers. The album was recorded at Sear Sound in Manhattan and produced by John Congleton.

== Background and recording ==
According to frontman John Darnielle, the album originated as Grunges, a planned sequel to the band's 2017 album Goths, after Darnielle joked on social media about writing a song titled "Contemplating Pearl Jam in the Carolina Dawn". Darnielle wrote the album's songs while his wife was away at a two-week residency in Virginia, a circumstance he compared to the writing of the band's 2002 album All Hail West Texas, which he had written while his wife was out of town playing hockey in Banff. Darnielle described the songs as loosely concerning the 1970s, 1980s, and 1990s, and about the accumulation of days receding into the past.

The album was recorded over a two-week session at Sear Sound in Manhattan with producer John Congleton, who also engineered and mixed the record. Guest contributors include Rob Jost on bass and French horn, harpist Mikaela Davis, and group backing vocals from Janis Siegel of the Manhattan Transfer, Catherine Russell, and Jamie and Carolyn Leonhart.

Days was released nine months after the band's previous studio album, Through This Fire Across from Peter Balkan (2025). Several of its songs concern musicians and music history of recent decades, including Alice in Chains singer Layne Staley, the band Candlebox, Renaissance vocalist Annie Haslam, the English extreme metal band Venom, and the Woodstock '99 festival.

== Release and promotion ==
The album was announced on May 13, 2026, alongside the release of its lead single, "Charlie Sheen Reaches Out to the Feds", inspired by actor Charlie Sheen's reported response to rumors of a snuff film in the 1990s. The announcement was accompanied by an international tour, including dates supported by Craig Finn of the Hold Steady in Europe.

The track "Going to Fennario" had previously been released as a standalone single in January 2026, prior to the album's announcement. A visualizer for "Woodstock '99", and other songs not accompanied by a video, was released alongside the album.

== Critical reception ==
Professional ratings
Aggregate scores
Source	Rating
Any Decent Music	7.4/10
Metacritic	80/100
Review scores
Source	Rating
AllMusic	4/5
Paste	B
Spill Magazine	4/5

Any Decent Music gave the album a weighted average score of 7.4 out of 10 from eight critic scores. According to Metacritic, it received "generally favorable" reviews based on a weighted average score of 80 out of 100 from six critic scores.

Reviewing the album for Paste, the critic characterized Days as a meditation on the rigidity of time and the power to reframe the past, describing the record as a collection of touchstones and takeaways reflecting what Darnielle chooses to remember and how he chooses to remember it. The review concluded that while the album was unlikely to be as foundational for listeners as All Hail West Texas, Tallahassee, or The Sunset Tree, it invited meaningful reflection on the listener's own past.

Spill Magazine described the album as a work of self-reflection looking back across recent decades with an increasing awareness of mortality, noting that it abandoned the gothic trappings of its originally conceived predecessor concept. Still Listening highlighted "Annie Haslam Imperial Phase" as a new wave-inflected standout featuring saxophone and synthesizer, and identified the title track and closer "Last Day" as the album's emotional core, presenting two diverging views of the end of life. Seven Days wrote that despite its dense musical references, the album did not require specialist knowledge to enjoy, with darker themes serving as accents to its fundamentally good-spirited character.

== Track listing ==
All tracks are written by John Darnielle.

No.	Title	Length
1.	"Song for Layne Staley"	2:12
2.	"Charlie Sheen Reaches Out to the Feds"	3:12
3.	"Shallow Grave"	2:29
4.	"Candlebox"	2:56
5.	"Annie Haslam Imperial Phase"	3:17
6.	"Crying on Eddie Nash's Grave"	2:52
7.	"Days"	2:33
8.	"Best Hard Rock Albums 2013"	2:57
9.	"Going to Fennario"	3:55
10.	"Woodstock '99"	3:58
11.	"Hidden Majesty of Later Venom Albums"	3:59
12.	"Last Day"	2:03

== Personnel ==
Credits adapted from album notes and digital credits.

The Mountain Goats

- John Darnielle – vocals, guitar, songwriting
- Jon Wurster – drums
- Matt Douglas – multi-instrumentalist

Additional musicians

- Rob Jost – bass, French horn
- Mikaela Davis – harp
- Janis Siegel – group backing vocals
- Catherine Russell – backing vocals
- Jamie Leonhart – backing vocals
- Carolyn Leonhart – backing vocals

Technical

- John Congleton – production, recording engineering, mixing
- Steven Sacco – assistant engineering
- Jasper Leach – assistant engineering
- Maximillian Trope – assistant engineering

== Charts ==
Chart performance for Days
Chart (2026)	Peak position
Australian Albums (ARIA)	83
UK Albums Sales (Official Charts)	73
UK Americana Albums (Official Charts)	10
UK Independent Albums (Official Charts)	20
US Top Album Sales (Billboard)	13
