= The Life of the World to Come (album) =

Studio album by the Mountain Goats
- Released: October 6, 2009
- Recorded: April–June 2009
- Studios: Electrical Audio in Chicago, Illinois; Sonic Ranch in Tornillo, Texas; and Baucom Road Studios in Monroe, North Carolina
- Genres: Folk rock, indie rock
- Length: 43:08
- Label: 4AD
- Producers: Brandon Eggleston, John Congleton, Scott Solter

The Mountain Goats chronology
Heretic Pride (2008)	The Life of the World to Come (2009)	All Eternals Deck (2011)

The Life of the World to Come is the twelfth studio album by the Mountain Goats, released by 4AD on October 6, 2009. The third track, "Genesis 3:23", was released as a free download via the band's website on July 28. The album peaked at #110 on the Billboard Top 200 albums on its chart debut.

The Life of the World to Come is a concept album in which John Darnielle draws inspiration from specific verses of the Bible. The twelve tracks of the album are each inspired by (and titled after) a single verse from either the Jewish Tanakh (that is, the Christian Old Testament) or the Christian New Testament. The album's title comes from a line of the Nicene Creed.

Early copies of the album sold via Rough Trade's physical and online stores featured a bonus CD-R, The Life of the World in Flux. It contains early drafts of most of the songs which appear on the main album and four extra songs that do not, and has some stylistic resemblances to both the band's pre-2002 'lo-fi' albums and to the 2005 The Sunset Tree LP. 2010 saw the release of The Life of the World to Come: A Film by Rian Johnson, in which American filmmaker Rian Johnson films a Claremont, California performance by Darnielle of the entire album, mostly solo on piano and guitar, but joined by former Mountain Goat Rachel Ware on several songs.

== Reception ==
Professional ratings
Aggregate scores
Source	Rating
Metacritic	78/100
Review scores
Source	Rating
AllMusic	3.5/5 stars
Robert Christgau	A−
Drowned In Sound	(8/10)
Pitchfork	(8.4/10)
PopMatters	9/10 stars
Slant Magazine	3.5/5 stars

The album was positively reviewed by critics, gaining 78/100 points on Metacritic. Pitchfork Media listed it as 45th best of the year, adding that album is "a work of deep, profound empathy-- the kind of thing the Bible is supposed to teach us in the first place". Music critic Robert Christgau said of the album: 'this is literary rock as it should be' and gave it an A− rating.

As of October 2009 it had sold 14,000 copies in the United States according to Nielsen SoundScan.

== Track listing ==
The Life of the World to Come
No.	Title	Length
1.	"1 Samuel 15:23"	4:07
2.	"Psalms 40:2"	3:13
3.	"Genesis 3:23"	3:10
4.	"Philippians 3:20-21"	3:03
5.	"Hebrews 11:40"	2:48
6.	"Genesis 30:3"	3:24
7.	"Romans 10:9"	2:42
8.	"1 John 4:16"	3:09
9.	"Matthew 25:21"	5:47
10.	"Deuteronomy 2:10"	3:21
11.	"Isaiah 45:23"	3:38
12.	"Ezekiel 7 and the Permanent Efficacy of Grace"	4:46
Total length:		43:08

iTunes bonus track
No.	Title	Length
13.	"Enoch 18:14"

Amazon bonus track
No.	Title	Length
13.	"Proverbs 6:27"

The Life of the World in Flux - Rough Trade bonus disc
No.	Title	Length
1.	"Deuteronomy 2:10"
2.	"Daniel 12:8 (third)"
3.	"Matthew 25:21"
4.	"1John 4:16"
5.	"Isaiah 45:23"
6.	"Hebrews 11:40"
7.	"Psalms 40:2"
8.	"Philippians 3:20–21"
9.	"Genesis 3:23"
10.	"Proverbs 6:27"
11.	"Romans 10:9"
12.	"Matthew 11:14–19"
13.	"Enoch 18:14"

The Life of the World to Come: A Film by Rian Johnson - limited edition live DVD
No.	Title	Length
1.	"Intro"
2.	"Enoch 18:14"
3.	"Genesis 30:3"
4.	"1John 4:16"
5.	"1Samuel 15:23"
6.	"Genesis 3:23"
7.	"Isaiah 45:23"
8.	"Philippians 3:20–21"
9.	"Psalms 40:2"
10.	"Romans 10:9"
11.	"Hebrews 11:40"
12.	"Deuteronomy 2:10"
13.	"Matthew 25:21"
14.	"Ezekiel 7 and the Permanent Efficacy of Grace"
15.	"Credits"

== Personnel ==
- John Darnielle - acoustic guitar, vocals, piano, keyboards
- Owen Pallett - strings, arrangement
- Peter Hughes - bass, electric guitar
- Jon Wurster - drums, percussion
- Vaughan Oliver - art direction, design
- Phoebe Richardson - artwork
- Brian Whitehead - assistant design
- Scott Solter - mixing
- Marc Atkins - photography
- Brandon Eggleston - production, engineering (Chicago)
- Grégoire Yeche - assistant production, assistant engineering (Chicago)
- John Congleton - production, engineering (Tornillo)
- Charles Godfrey - assistant production, assistant engineering (Tornillo)
- Scott Solter - production, engineering (Monroe)
