= Jenny from Thebes =

Studio album by the Mountain Goats
- Released: October 27, 2023
- Recorded: January 16–22, 2023
- Studio: The Church, Tulsa, Oklahoma
- Genre: Alternative rock
- Length: 39:43
- Label: Merge
- Producer: Trina Shoemaker

The Mountain Goats chronology
| Bleed Out (2022) | Jenny from Thebes (2023) | Through This Fire Across from Peter Balkan (2025) |

Singles from Jenny from Thebes
- 1. "Clean Slate" Released: July 19, 2023; 2. "Fresh Tattoo" Released: August 23, 2023; 3. "Murder at the 18th St. Garage" Released: September 26, 2023

Jenny from Thebes is the 22nd studio album by indie folk band the Mountain Goats, released on October 27, 2023, through Merge Records. The album serves as a sequel to the band's 2002 release All Hail West Texas, and is structured as a rock opera which tells the story of the character "Jenny" (from the band's previous albums, including All Hail West Texas, along with 2001's Jam Eater Blues and 2012's Transcendental Youth). Lyricist John Darnielle describes the album as being about "the individual and society", and about Jenny's "southwestern ranch style house, the people for whom that house is a place of safety, and the west Texas town that is uncomfortable with its existence."

The album was recorded between January 16–22, 2023 at The Church Studio in Tulsa, Oklahoma and features performances by Darnielle, Alicia Bognanno, Matt Douglas, Peter Hughes, Jon Wurster, Matt Nathanson, and Kathy Valentine. The album was preceded by the lead single "Clean Slate", followed by the singles "Fresh Tattoo" and "Murder at the 18th Street Garage".

It is the final Mountain Goats album to feature longtime bassist Peter Hughes, who departed from the band amicably in August 2024.

== Critical reception ==
Professional ratings
Aggregate scores
| Source | Rating |
|---|---|
| Metacritic | 80/100 |
Review scores
| Source | Rating |
| Exclaim! | 8/10 |
| Paste | 9.3/10 |
| Uncut | 8/10 |

Jenny from Thebes received a score of 80 out of 100 on review aggregator Metacritic based on seven critics' reviews, indicating "generally favorable" reviews. Uncut stated that "familiarity with the back-story is not necessary to enjoy this potted indie-rock opera: as always with Darnielle's work, an appreciation of droll storytelling and deadpan melodies will do". Reviewing the album for Exclaim!, Eric Hill felt that it "manages to truly distill the manic energy of the Mountain Goats' formative phase into a maturing yet vital shape, giving it a place in the upper reaches of their pantheon". Paste named it album of the week, with the reviewer Laura Dzubay writing that "while Jenny from Thebes feels big compared to the Mountain Goats' stripped-down albums, there's restraint on these songs, and the rock-opera approach never feels garish", calling it "a fitting new record" from the band. John Amen of No Depression wrote, "Jenny From Thebes spotlights The Mountain Goats as they explore various sonic balances, Darnielle exercising his narrative and impressionistic bents." He concluded by describing the album as "a largely engaging, if occasionally 'lite,' set."

== Track listing ==
Jenny from Thebes track listing
| No. | Title | Length |
|---|---|---|
| 1. | "Clean Slate" | 3:48 |
| 2. | "Ground Level" | 2:22 |
| 3. | "Only One Way" | 4:01 |
| 4. | "Fresh Tattoo" | 4:42 |
| 5. | "Cleaning Crew" | 3:36 |
| 6. | "Murder at the 18th St. Garage" | 2:52 |
| 7. | "From the Nebraska Plant" | 3:33 |
| 8. | "Same as Cash" | 3:44 |
| 9. | "Water Tower" | 2:27 |
| 10. | "Jenny III" | 2:26 |
| 11. | "Going to Dallas" | 2:02 |
| 12. | "Great Pirates" | 4:10 |
| Total length: | | 39:43 |

== Personnel ==
The Mountain Goats

- Alicia Bognanno – performance
- John Darnielle – performance
- Matt Douglas – performance, string and horn arrangements
- Peter Hughes – performance
- Jon Wurster – performance

Additional contributors

- Trina Shoemaker – production, mixing, recording
- Brent Lambert – mastering
- Isaiah Page – engineering assistance
- Cade Roberts – engineering assistance
- Matt Nathanson – additional instrumentation
- Kathy Valentine – additional instrumentation
- Karen Galvin – strings
- Evan Ringel – trombone
- Daniel Murphy – design
- Jenny – narration on "Cleaning Crew"

== Charts ==
Chart performance for Jenny from Thebes
| Chart (2023) | Peak position |
|---|---|
| UK Album Downloads (OCC) | 29 |
| UK Independent Albums (OCC) | 48 |
