= We Shall All Be Healed =

Studio album by the Mountain Goats
- Released: February 3, 2004
- Studios: Bear Creek, Woodinville, Washington
- Length: 44:45
- Label: 4AD
- Producers: John Vanderslice; Scott Solter

The Mountain Goats chronology
| Tallahassee (2002) | We Shall All Be Healed (2004) | The Sunset Tree (2005) |

Singles from We Shall All Be Healed
- 1. "Palmcorder Yajna" Released: 2003; 2. "Letter from Belgium" Released: 2004

We Shall All Be Healed is the eighth studio album by The Mountain Goats. The album focuses on semi-fictional accounts of band leader John Darnielle's years as a teenager, particularly his friends' and acquaintances' experiences in California and in Portland, Oregon, as methamphetamine addicts. As The Mountain Goats' official website puts it: "All of the songs on We Shall All Be Healed are based on people John used to know. Most of them are probably dead or in jail by now."

Like the previous Mountain Goats album, Tallahassee, but unlike the rest of Darnielle's repertoire up to its release, We Shall All Be Healed was recorded with a full band in a recording studio, and produced by John Vanderslice, as opposed to The Mountain Goats' previous practice of recording at home on a boom box with, at most, one or two backup vocalists or a bassist. Two singles were released from the album, "Palmcorder Yajna" and "Letter from Belgium". "Palmcorder Yajna", when played in concert, is often played with the backing of members of one or more of the opening acts on tour with The Mountain Goats. The song "Cotton" was featured in an episode of the television series Weeds.

One of the provisional titles for the album was New Age Music Will Save Your Wretched Soul.

== Reception ==
Professional ratings
Aggregate scores
| Source | Rating |
|---|---|
| Metacritic | 77/100 |
Review scores
| Source | Rating |
| AllMusic | 3.5/5 stars |
| Alternative Press | 4/5 |
| Blender | 3/5 stars |
| Mojo | 3/5 stars |
| Pitchfork | 6.9/10 |
| Q | 3/5 stars |
| Rolling Stone | 3/5 stars |
| Spin | 8/10 |
| Uncut | 4/5 stars |
| The Village Voice | A |

We Shall All Be Healed was generally liked by critics, though it was divisive in some circles regarding the different direction taken in the album's creation, with a new production style and a band playing alongside the traditionally solo John Darnielle. Other critics, however, felt that the change only added to the power of John Darnielle's voice, creating a 'brighter' sound and adding to the emotionality of Darnielle's lyricism. Influential music critic Robert Christgau of The Village Voice gave We Shall All Be Healed an 'A' grade, calling it a 'singer's record' and praising its character-driven storytelling. In a review for PopMatters, David Antrobus hailed We Shall All Be Healed for Darnielle's embrace of autobiographical material and fuller production while retaining the band's "trenchant wit" and "inscrutable narrative drive". He described Darnielle's voice as a "slightly rusty scalpel" achieving "tarnished beauty". Antrobus asserted the album came closer to achieving "the whole damned elusive enchilada" thematically, lyrically, and rhythmically than anything else released in 2004."

== Track listing ==
All tracks are written by John Darnielle.

| No. | Title | Length |
|---|---|---|
| 1. | "Slow West Vultures" | 2:41 |
| 2. | "Palmcorder Yajna" | 4:08 |
| 3. | "Linda Blair Was Born Innocent" | 2:46 |
| 4. | "Letter from Belgium" | 3:11 |
| 5. | "The Young Thousands" | 4:34 |
| 6. | "Your Belgian Things" | 3:49 |
| 7. | "Mole" | 4:32 |
| 8. | "Home Again Garden Grove" | 3:15 |
| 9. | "All Up the Seething Coast" | 3:45 |
| 10. | "Quito" | 2:03 |
| 11. | "Cotton" | 3:25 |
| 12. | "Against Pollution" | 3:43 |
| 13. | "Pigs That Ran Straightaway into the Water, Triumph Of" | 2:52 |
| Total length: | | 44:45 |

== Personnel ==
- John Darnielle – vocals, guitar
- John Vanderslice – production
- Franklin Bruno – piano
- Peter Hughes – bass
- Nora Danielson – violin
- Christopher McGuire – drums
