= Getting Into Knives =

Studio album by the Mountain Goats
- Released: October 23, 2020
- Recorded: March 1–6, 2020
- Studio: Phillips Recording (Memphis, Tennessee)
- Genre: Alternative rock
- Length: 56:36
- Label: Merge
- Producer: Matt Ross-Spang

The Mountain Goats chronology
Songs for Pierre Chuvin (2020)	Getting Into Knives (2020)	Dark in Here (2021)

Singles from Getting Into Knives
- 1. "As Many Candles as Possible" Released: August 11, 2020; 2. "Get Famous" Released: September 14, 2020; 3. "Picture of My Dress" Released: October 12, 2020

Professional ratings
Aggregate scores
Source	Rating
Metacritic	78/100
Review scores
Source	Rating
American Songwriter	4.5/5 stars
Exclaim!	7/10
Pitchfork	7.7/10
Paste Magazine	8.8/10

Getting Into Knives is the nineteenth studio album by indie folk band the Mountain Goats, released on October 23, 2020, through Merge Records. The album was recorded in March 2020 over six days at Sam Philips Recording in Memphis, in the same room where psychobilly band the Cramps tracked their 1980 debut album Songs the Lord Taught Us. Getting Into Knives was produced, engineered, and mixed by Matt Ross-Spang, who previously engineered In League with Dragons (2019). In addition to being available on streaming and download services, the album also saw physical release on CD, vinyl, and cassette.

The lead single, "As Many Candles as Possible", was released on August 11, 2020, along with a lyric video directed by Lalitree Darnielle. The song features organist Charles Hodges. "Get Famous" was released on September 14, 2020 and the music video, featuring the band as bobbleheads, was released on October 1, 2020. The final single "Picture of My Dress" was released on October 12, 2020.

== Track listing ==
Album and track metadata and details adapted from Bandcamp.

All tracks are written by John Darnielle.

Getting Into Knives track listing
No.	Title	Length
1.	"Corsican Mastiff Stride"	2:20
2.	"Get Famous"	3:19
3.	"Picture of My Dress"	4:20
4.	"As Many Candles as Possible" (featuring Charles Hodges)	3:24
5.	"Tidal Wave"	5:25
6.	"Pez Dorado"	4:56
7.	"The Last Place I Saw You Alive"	4:40
8.	"Bell Swamp Connection"	5:50
9.	"The Great Gold Sheep"	5:03
10.	"Rat Queen"	4:09
11.	"Wolf Count"	3:49
12.	"Harbor Me"	4:07
13.	"Getting Into Knives"	5:14
Total length:		56:36

== Personnel ==
The Mountain Goats

- John Darnielle – vocals, guitars, piano
- Peter Hughes – electric bass, upright bass
- Matt Douglas – keyboards, woodwinds, guitars, accordion, backing vocals
- Jon Wurster – drums, percussion

Additional personnel

- Bram Gielen – piano, guitars, keyboards
- Chris Boerner – guitars
- Charles Hodges – Hammond B-3 (4)
- Sam Shoup – Mellotron
- Tom Clary – horns
- Reba Russell – backing vocals
- Susan Marshall – backing vocals

Production

- Matt Ross-Spang – production, engineering, mixing
- Brent Lambert – mastering (The Kitchen Mastering, Carrboro, North Carolina)
- Daniel Murphy – design
- Wesley Graham – assistant
- Matt Denham – studio attaché
- Ryan Matteson – assistant

== Charts ==
Chart performance for Getting Into Knives
Chart (2020)	Peak position
US Billboard 200	162
US Americana/Folk Albums (Billboard)	4
US Independent Albums (Billboard)	34
US Top Rock Albums (Billboard)	27
