= Full Force Galesburg =

Album by The Mountain Goats

Studio album by the Mountain Goats
- Released: June 10, 1997
- Recorded: 1996–1997
- Genre: Lo-fi
- Length: 41:06
- Label: Emperor Jones
- Producer: John Darnielle

The Mountain Goats chronology
Nothing for Juice (1996)	Full Force Galesburg (1997)	The Coroner's Gambit (2000)

Professional ratings
Review scores
Source	Rating
Allmusic	2.5/5 stars
Fretplay	5/5 stars

Full Force Galesburg is the fourth studio album by the Mountain Goats, released in 1997.

It consists of songs written and recorded by John Darnielle. Darnielle has stated that most, if not all, of the album was written in Grinnell, Iowa. Most of the songs were performed by Darnielle singing and playing guitar solo, and recorded on his Panasonic RX-FT500 boom box; however, several songs also feature stringed instrumentation from Alastair Galbraith. Nothing Painted Blue's Peter Hughes adds backing vocals and guitar work on a few tracks as well. Hughes went on to join the Mountain Goats as a full-time member of the band in 2002.

== Track listing ==
No.	Title	Length
1.	"New Britain"	2:36
2.	"Snow Owl"	2:17
3.	"West Country Dream"	2:03
4.	"Masher"	3:21
5.	"Chinese House Flowers"	2:57
6.	"Ontario"	2:30
7.	"Down Here"	1:35
8.	"Twin Human Highway Flares"	2:42
9.	"Weekend in Western Illinois"	2:43
10.	"US Mill"	2:27
11.	"Song for the Julian Calendar"	2:17
12.	"Maize Stalk Drinking Blood"	2:26
13.	"Evening in Stalingrad"	2:31
14.	"Minnesota"	3:57
15.	"Original Air-Blue Gown"	2:51
16.	"It's All Here in Brownsville"	1:53
Total length:		41:06

== Personnel ==
- John Darnielle - vocals, guitar
- Alastair Galbraith - violin (13, 15)
- Peter Hughes - vocals, electric guitar (7,9)
- Bob Durkee - electric guitar (7,9)

== Notes ==
The image on the top left of the album cover features the Hindu goddess Durga riding a tiger, along with Hanuman (left) and Bhairav (right).
