= Dark in Here =

Studio album by the Mountain Goats
- Released: June 25, 2021
- Recorded: March 9–14, 2020
- Studio: FAME (Muscle Shoals, Alabama)
- Length: 46:40
- Label: Merge
- Producer: Matt Ross-Spang

The Mountain Goats chronology
Getting Into Knives (2020)	Dark in Here (2021)	Bleed Out (2022)

Singles from Dark in Here
- 1. "Mobile" Released: April 20, 2021; 2. "The Slow Parts on Death Metal Albums" Released: May 11, 2021; 3. "Dark in Here" Released: June 3, 2021

Professional ratings
Aggregate scores
Source	Rating
Metacritic	80/100
Review scores
Source	Rating
AllMusic	4/5 stars
American Songwriter	3.5/5 stars
Paste	8.3/10
Pitchfork	7.8/10
PopMatters	7/10
Rolling Stone	3.5/5 stars

Dark in Here is the 20th studio album by indie folk band the Mountain Goats, released June 25, 2021 through Merge Records. The album was recorded in March 2020, just one week after Getting Into Knives (2020), at FAME Studios in Muscle Shoals, Alabama. Dark in Here was produced by Matt Ross-Spang, who also produced Getting Into Knives and engineered In League with Dragons (2019). In addition to being available on streaming and download services, the album was released physically on CD and vinyl.

The album's lead single, "Mobile", featuring organists Spooner Oldham and Will McFarlane, was released on April 20, 2021. "The Slow Parts on Death Metal Albums" was released on May 11, 2021, and the title track "Dark in Here" was released as the final single on June 3, 2021.

The album's cover art is a portion of the painting Valborgsmässoafton i Bergslagen, Grangärde i Dalarna ("Walpurgis Night in Bergslagen, Grandgärde in Dalarna") by Anshelm Schultzberg (1896).

== Accolades ==
Dark in Here on year-end lists
Publication	List	Rank	Ref.
Paste	The 50 Best Albums of 2021	43	

== Track listing ==
All tracks are written by John Darnielle.

Dark in Here track listing
No.	Title	Length
1.	"Parisian Enclave"	1:25
2.	"The Destruction of the Kola Superdeep Borehole Tower"	3:20
3.	"Mobile"	3:42
4.	"Dark in Here"	3:23
5.	"Lizard Suit"	4:15
6.	"When a Powerful Animal Comes"	5:26
7.	"To the Headless Horseman"	3:54
8.	"The New Hydra Collection"	2:28
9.	"The Slow Parts on Death Metal Albums"	5:26
10.	"Before I Got There"	4:14
11.	"Arguing with the Ghost of Peter Laughner About His Coney Island Baby Review"	3:57
12.	"Let Me Bathe in Demonic Light"	5:10
Total length:		46:40

== Personnel ==
The Mountain Goats

- John Darnielle – guitars, vocals, piano
- Peter Hughes – bass
- Jon Wurster – drums, percussion
- Matt Douglas – woodwinds, piano, guitar

Additional personnel

- Spooner Oldham – Hammond B-3, Wurlitzer organ
- Will McFarlane – guitar
- Susan Marshall – vocal harmony
- Reba Russell – vocal harmony

Production

- Matt Ross-Spang – production, engineering
- Shana Gandhi – mixing
- John Lee Gifford – production assistant
- Brent Lambert – mastering (The Kitchen Mastering, Carrboro, North Carolina)

== Charts ==
Chart performance for Dark in Here
Chart (2021)	Peak position
US Americana/Folk Albums (Billboard)	6
US Independent Albums (Billboard)	40
US Top Album Sales (Billboard)	16
US Top Rock Albums (Billboard)	46
