= This Year (the Mountain Goats song) =

Song by The Mountain Goats

from the album The Sunset Tree
- Released: 26 April 2005
- Recorded: November 2004
- Studio: Prairie Sun, Cotati, California
- Length: 3:52
- Label: 4AD
- Songwriter: John Darnielle
- Producer: John Vanderslice

Music video
- "This Year" on YouTube

"This Year" is a 2005 song by American band the Mountain Goats from their album The Sunset Tree, a semi-autobiographical account of John Darnielle's childhood and youth, often focussed on domestic violence, and largely written in the wake of his step-father's death.

== Background and composition ==
When Darnielle was 5, his mother left his father, and she and the children moved to an apartment with the man who was to become his stepfather. Darnielle said, "We moved in, and my sister and I loved my stepfather. He was fun. He's the fun dad. And I'll never forget this gray glass flying across the room—it was full of milk—and breaking on the wall. And it was like this sudden intrusion of violence." His stepfather was physically abusive to Darnielle and his mother, and verbally abusive to the whole family. When Darnielle was a teenager, his stepfather hit his head so forcefully that an ear-stud was driven into his neck. Darnielle described him as "a gigantic egotist who considered himself really, really intelligent."

Darnielle received news that his stepfather died in December 2003, and was undertaking a European tour in early 2004 when he began writing lyrics pertaining to his family life. Darnielle said the song is "about how sometimes you are living in a house and you're in high school and your stepfather is abusing your mother and you, and it really sucks. You have to take a lot of drugs to deal with that. You don't have to, I should say. But you probably do. And when you do, they make you feel marginally better.

== Reception ==
AllMusic said, "Darnielle's talent for writing an engaging narrative is matched only by the succinctness of the music behind it. This is especially true on standout cuts like "This Year", a near-perfect snapshot of youthful defiance with its rousing, last-road-trip-ever refrain of 'I am gonna make it through this year if it kills me'." Pitchfork said, "Brandishing the triumphant chorus, 'I'm gonna make it through this year if it kills me'—"This Year" finds 17-year-old Darnielle breaking free from his 'broken house' on a Saturday morning to play video games 'in a drunk haze' while holding hands with a girl named Kathy.

In 2026, Rolling Stone named "This Year" as one of the top 200 songs of the 21st century, calling it "the sort of warts-and-all autobiography that feels uncomfortably intimate."
