= The Coroner's Gambit =

Studio album by the Mountain Goats
- Released: October 17, 2000
- Genre: Lo-fi
- Length: 43:00
- Label: Absolutely Kosher
- Producer: John Darnielle

The Mountain Goats chronology
Full Force Galesburg (1997)	The Coroner's Gambit (2000)	All Hail West Texas (2002)

Professional ratings
Review scores
Source	Rating
AllMusic	4/5 stars
Pitchfork	8.5/10
Splendid (ezine)	(favorable)
Sputnikmusic	4.5/5 stars

The Coroner's Gambit is the fifth studio album by the Mountain Goats, released on October 17, 2000, by Absolutely Kosher Records. John Darnielle was the only Mountain Goat performing on this album, as it was released in the several year period before Peter Hughes had joined the band, but after Rachel Ware had left. Darnielle offers up an alternative title for the album - 'Slavonic Dances, if you prefer'.

Darnielle has noted that several of the songs from the album, including "The Coroner's Gambit", "Bluejays and Cardinals", and "Shadow Song", were written with Rozz Williams in mind. Rozz Williams, a close friend of Darnielle, was a pioneer of the American gothic rock scene and a founding member of Christian Death among other bands. Williams died by suicide in 1998, two years before the release of The Coroner's Gambit. In some live versions of songs from the album, Darnielle has addressed Williams by first name.

In June 2024, Merge Records re-issued The Coroner's Gambit on vinyl and CD, and a cassette version was issued for the first time. The 2024 release featured new liner notes by Darnielle.

== Recording ==
The album is dominated by John Darnielle and his acoustic guitar, but there is sparse auxiliary instrumentation on some of the tracks. Most of the songs were, like the majority of pre-2002 Mountain Goats recordings, recorded on Darnielle's Panasonic RX-FT500 boom box, but due to either mechanical failure or desire for a different artistic effect, Darnielle used a 4-track recording machine for some tracks.

== Track listing ==
No.	Title	Length
1.	"Jaipur"	3:13
2.	"Elijah"	3:07
3.	"Trick Mirror"	2:40
4.	"Island Garden Song"	2:27
5.	"The Coroner's Gambit"	2:55
6.	"Baboon"	2:16
7.	"Scotch Grove"	1:37
8.	"Horseradish Road"	2:28
9.	"Family Happiness"	2:57
10.	"Onions"	2:15
11.	"Bluejays and Cardinals"	3:03
12.	"Shadow Song"	2:45
13.	"There Will Be No Divorce"	2:51
14.	"Insurance Fraud #2"	3:02
15.	"The Alphonse Mambo"	2:44
16.	"We Were Patriots"	2:40
Total length:		43:00

== Personnel ==
- John Darnielle - vocals, guitar, production
