= Bleed Out (Mountain Goats album) =

Studio album by the Mountain Goats
- Released: August 19, 2022
- Recorded: January 2021
- Studios: Betty's (Chapel Hill, North Carolina, US)
- Genre: Alternative rock
- Length: 47:18
- Label: Merge
- Producer: Alicia Bognanno

The Mountain Goats chronology
Dark in Here (2021)	Bleed Out (2022)	Jenny from Thebes (2023)

Singles from Bleed Out
- 1. "Training Montage" Released: June 1, 2022; 2. "Wage Wars Get Rich Die Handsome" Released: July 11, 2022; 3. "Mark on You" Released: August 2, 2022

Professional ratings
Aggregate scores
Source	Rating
Metacritic	74/100
Review scores
Source	Rating
AllMusic	4/5 stars
And It Don't Stop	A
The Guardian	3/5 stars
Mojo	3/5 stars
Paste	7.4/10
Pitchfork	7.6/10
Record Collector	3/5 stars
Uncut	7/10

Bleed Out is the 21st studio album by indie folk band the Mountain Goats, released on August 19, 2022, through Merge Records. The album was written between December 2020 and January 2021, and recorded immediately following this at Betty's in Chapel Hill, North Carolina. Bleed Out was produced by Alicia Bognanno of Bully. The album was preceded by the lead single "Training Montage".

== Background and recording ==
Mountain Goats frontman John Darnielle took inspiration from action films from the 1960s to the 1980s that he watched at his home in North Carolina towards the end of 2020. He then began writing songs, and in January 2021, was joined by bandmates Peter Hughes, Jon Wurster, and Matt Douglas at Betty's Studios near his home in Chapel Hill, where recording was completed within a week.

== Critical reception ==
According to music critic Robert Christgau, Bleed Out relies more heavily on electric guitars than Darnielle's preceding work, while the logically "allusive" lyrics portray characters, "good [or] bad", who are generally "on some edge or other in a culture stretched near the breaking point by greed and violence that have become commonplaces." Christgau gives the album an 'A' grade.

== Track listing ==
All lyrics and music are written by John Darnielle except where otherwise noted. Writing credits are taken from the album's liner notes.

Bleed Out track listing
No.	Title	Lyrics	Music	Length
1.	"Training Montage"			4:28
2.	"Mark on You"			2:21
3.	"Wage Wars Get Rich Die Handsome"		Darnielle; Matt Douglas	2:30
4.	"Extraction Point"			5:20
5.	"Bones Don't Rust"			2:24
6.	"First Blood"			3:06
7.	"Make You Suffer"			3:29
8.	"Guys on Every Corner"			3:13
9.	"Hostages"			7:09
10.	"Need More Bandages"			3:41
11.	"Incandescent Ruins"			2:28
12.	"Bleed Out"	Darnielle; Peter Hughes		7:09
Total length:				47:18

== Charts ==
Chart performance for Bleed Out
Chart (2022)	Peak position
Scottish Albums (Official Charts)	73
UK Album Downloads (Official Charts)	33
UK Independent Albums (Official Charts)	22
US Americana/Folk Albums (Billboard)	8
US Independent Albums (Billboard)	37
US Top Album Sales (Billboard)	10
US Vinyl Albums (Billboard)	9
