= Through This Fire Across from Peter Balkan =

2025 studio album by the Mountain Goats

Studio album by the Mountain Goats
- Released: November 7, 2025
- Recorded: January 19–27, 2025
- Studio: Dreamland (Hurley, New York)
- Genre: Indie folk
- Length: 50:23
- Label: Cadmean Dawn
- Producer: Matt Douglas

The Mountain Goats chronology
Jenny from Thebes (2023)	Through This Fire Across from Peter Balkan (2025)	Days (2026)

Singles from Through This Fire Across from Peter Balkan
- 1. "Armies of the Lord" Released: September 9, 2025; 2. "Cold at Night" Released: October 7, 2025; 3. "Rocks in My Pockets" Released: October 7, 2025

Through This Fire Across from Peter Balkan is the twenty-third studio album by American indie folk band the Mountain Goats. The album was released on November 7, 2025, on the band’s independent label Cadmean Dawn. It was recorded at Dreamland Recording Studios in New York and produced by band member Matt Douglas.

It is the band's first full-band album in over 23 years not to feature longtime bass guitarist Peter Hughes, who departed from the band in 2024.

== Background ==
The title originated from a phrase John Darnielle noted in a dream, which became the conceptual basis for the album. Between completion of the demos and the final studio recording, the band's long-time bassist Peter Hughes formally retired from the band in August 2024. The record is dedicated to him. Darnielle stated that he briefly considered changing the name of the record to avoid confusion about the record's origins, but ultimately kept it intact.

The album is described in its promotional materials as a “full-on musical,” telling the story of a shipwrecked crew of sixteen men, only three of whom survive a catastrophic storm. One survivor goes missing, leaving the narrator and Captain Peter Balkan struggling with visions and physical decline.

== Recording ==
The album was recorded over nine days in January 2025 at Dreamland Recording Studios in Hurley, New York. It features guest vocals from Lin-Manuel Miranda. It was produced and mixed by Matt Douglas, engineered by Matthew Barnhart, with assistant engineering by Ben Loughran.

== Release and promotion ==
The lead single, "Armies of the Lord," featuring guest vocals from Lin-Manuel Miranda, was released on September 9, 2025. The band announced a North American tour in support of the album beginning in September 2025.

== Critical reception ==
The album received a positive review from The Guardian's Dave Simpson, who rated the album four out of five stars and described the album as "sumptuously crafted, full of gallows humour and – as with so much of Darnielle’s best work – delving below the surface reveals layers of deeper meaning about humanity, togetherness and the precious joys of being alive." Rating the album a 7.4 out of 10, Paste Magazine's Casey Epstein-Gross describes the album as "a record that dramatizes collapse but—for better or for worse—never quite gives in to it." Writing for AllMusic, Mark Deming concluded that the album "confirms the Mountain Goats have talent that's on par with their ambitions, and this album is a thoughtful, dramatically satisfying experience". Deming also noted that Darnielle's talents as a vocalist have continued to grow, saying that Darnielle's "phrasing and sense of where to place the notes and how hard to hit them is superb here."

== Track listing ==
Track listing taken from the official Bandcamp page. Songwriting credits taken from Apple Music.

All tracks are written by John Darnielle except where otherwise specified.

No.	Title	Writer(s)	Length
1.	"Overture"	Darnielle; Matt Douglas; Jon Wurster	4:25
2.	"Fishing Boat"	Darnielle; Douglas	5:05
3.	"Cold at Night"		3:30
4.	"Dawn of Revelation"		3:31
5.	"Your Bandage"	Darnielle; Douglas	4:36
6.	"Peru"		3:54
7.	"Through this Fire"		3:18
8.	"Rocks in My Pockets"		4:04
9.	"Armies of the Lord"		5:09
10.	"Your Glow"		4:28
11.	"The Lady from Shanghai 2"	Darnielle; Douglas; Cameron Ralston	5:21
12.	"Broken to Begin With"		3:02
Total length:			50:23

== Personnel ==
All credits via Bandcamp.

=== The Mountain Goats ===
- John Darnielle – vocals, guitar
- Jon Wurster – drums, percussion, guitar
- Matt Douglas – piano, keyboards, guitar, woodwinds; production, arrangements

=== Additional musicians ===
- Cameron Ralston – bass
- Ben Loughran – synths
- Karen Galvin – strings
- Tommy Stinson – bass on "Cold at Night" and "Dawn of Revelation"
- Lin-Manuel Miranda – backing vocals on “Cold at Night,” “Through this Fire,” “Armies of the Lord,” and “Broken to Begin With”
- Mikaela Davis – harp
- Josh Kaufman – guitar
- Gabriel Mairson – French horn
- Nicole Lawrence – pedal steel

== Charts ==
Chart performance for Through This Fire Across from Peter Balkan
Chart (2025)	Peak position
UK Album Downloads (Official Charts)	20
UK Independent Albums (Official Charts)	46
US Top Album Sales (Billboard)	18
