= Transcendental Youth =

Studio album by the Mountain Goats
- Released: October 2, 2012
- Recorded: 2012
- Studio: Overdub Lane, Durham, North Carolina
- Genre: Indie rock
- Length: 39:10
- Label: Merge
- Producer: Brandon Eggleston

The Mountain Goats chronology
All Eternals Deck (2011)	Transcendental Youth (2012)	Beat the Champ (2015)

Professional ratings
Aggregate scores
Source	Rating
AnyDecentMusic?	7.5/10
Metacritic	81/100
Review scores
Source	Rating
AllMusic	4/5 stars
Alternative Press	4/5 stars
American Songwriter	4/5 stars
The A.V. Club	B+
MSN Music (Robert Christgau)	A
NME	7/10
Pitchfork	7.8/10
Rolling Stone	3.5/5 stars
Spin	8/10
Uncut	8/10

Transcendental Youth is the fourteenth studio album by the Mountain Goats. The album focuses on outcasts, recluses, the mentally ill, and others struggling in ordinary society. The album is loosely unified around a group of people living in Washington state. At least one character is confirmed to be recurring from All Hail West Texas, an earlier album.

Several songs were performed in concert with a capella quartet Anonymous 4 and featured arrangements by long-time friend Owen Pallett. However, Anonymous 4 and Owen Pallett do not appear on the official studio album. This is the first Mountain Goats album to prominently feature a horn section, contributed and arranged by fellow musician Matthew E. White, who opened for the band on their 2012 tour.

The first 1,000 preorders of the album came with a bonus 7", containing demos for the songs "Steal Smoked Fish" on Side A, and "In the Shadow of the Western Hills," which was originally written for the album, on Side B.

== Critical reception ==
Transcendental Youth received a score of 81 out of 100 on review aggregator Metacritic based on thirty critics' reviews, indicating "universal acclaim". AllMusic's Fred Thomas called the album 'some of the strongest, most compelling work of an already brilliant run', and veteran music critic Robert Christgau awarded the album an 'A' grade.

Many critics highlighted the addition of horn arrangements, contributed by Matthew E. White, as a distinctive new element in the Mountain Goats' sound. Lindsay Zoladz of Pitchfork noted that the brass sections added "emotion range" and "complex and many-hued" feelings to tracks like "Cry for Judas" and "Transcendental Youth", while Keith Harris of Spin magazine suggested the horns provided a crucial counterweight to the album's darker themes, "hint[ing] at a fuller world outside the claustrophobic thoughts of a song's narrator."

== Track listing ==
First reported by John Darnielle on July 9, 2012, the track list is:

No.	Title	Length
1.	"Amy AKA Spent Gladiator 1"	2:27
2.	"Lakeside View Apartments Suite"	3:58
3.	"Cry for Judas"	3:13
4.	"Harlem Roulette"	3:23
5.	"White Cedar"	3:05
6.	"Until I Am Whole"	2:49
7.	"Night Light"	3:59
8.	"The Diaz Brothers"	2:46
9.	"Counterfeit Florida Plates"	2:23
10.	"In Memory of Satan"	4:01
11.	"Spent Gladiator 2"	2:52
12.	"Transcendental Youth"	4:10

Japanese bonus tracks
No.	Title	Length
13.	"Steal Smoked Fish Alternate Take (piano version)"	3:44
14.	"Tomorrow (from the musical "Annie")"	3:33

Deluxe edition bonus 7"
No.	Title	Length
1.	"Steal Smoked Fish (guitar version)"	3:14
2.	"In the Shadow of the Western Hills"	2:35

== Personnel ==
- John Darnielle – vocals, guitar, piano, lyrics, composition
- Peter Hughes – bass, backing vocals
- Jon Wurster – drums, percussion
- Matthew E. White – horn arrangements
- Bob Miller – trumpet
- Bryan Hooten – trombone
- Reggie Chapman – bass trombone
- John Licley – tenor saxophone, clarinet
- Jason Scott – tenor saxophone, clarinet, flute
- Phil Cook – piano on "The Diaz Brothers"

Production

- Scott Solter – mixing, "electronics and atmosphere"
- Brent Lambert – mastering, vocals on the song "Transcendental Youth"
