= The Extra Lens =

American band

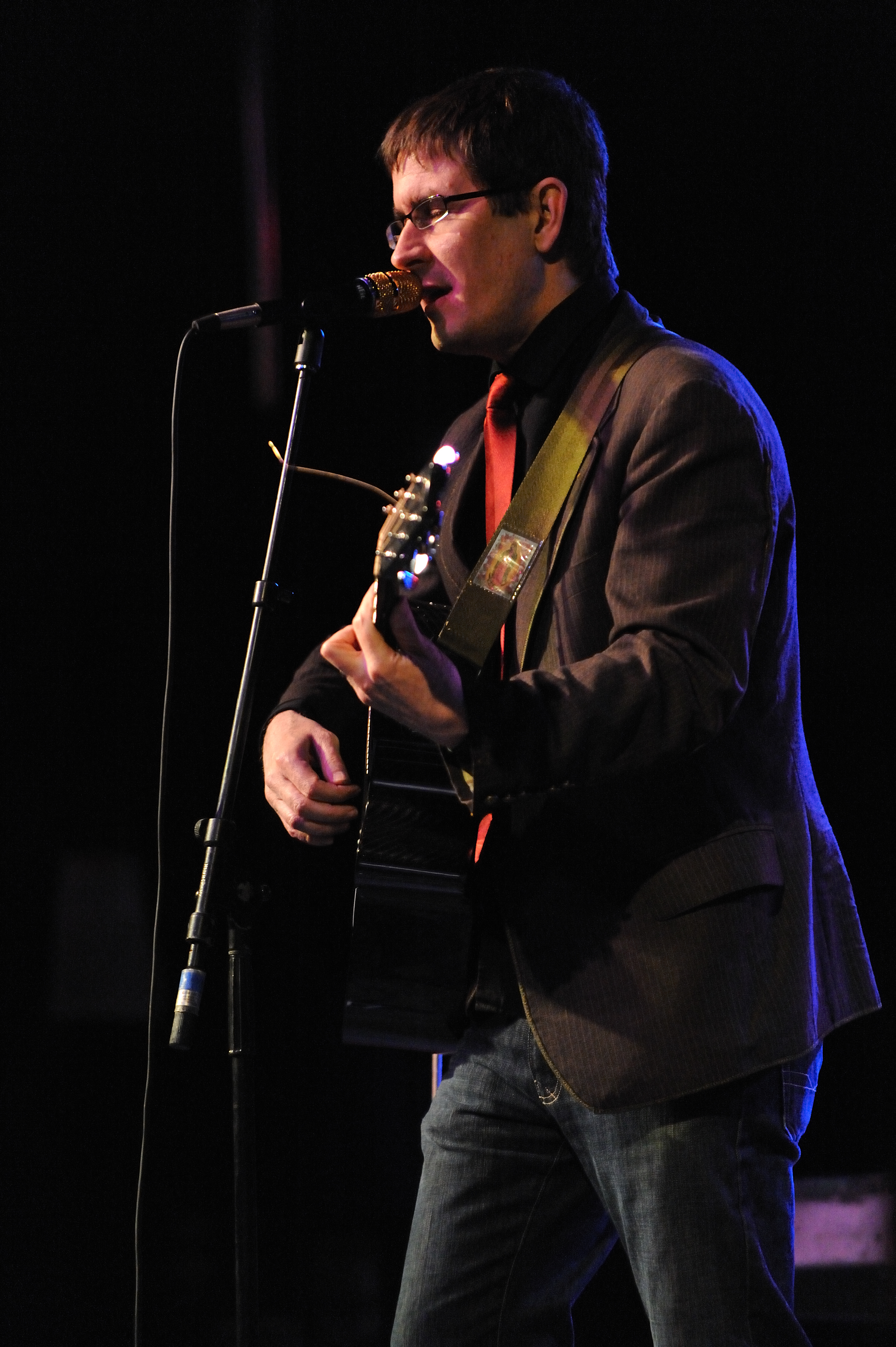
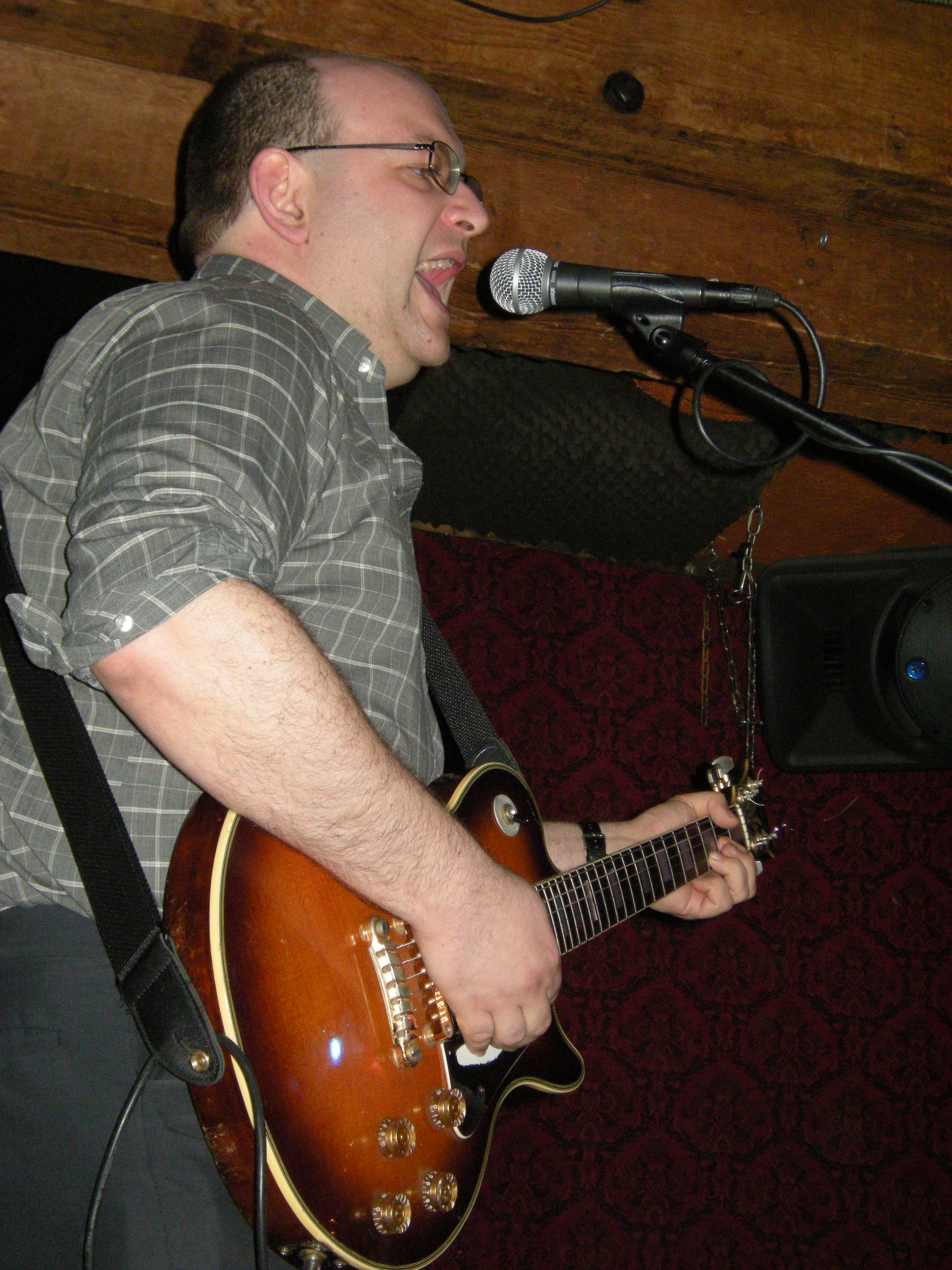
- John Darnielle (left) and Franklin Bruno (right)

Background information
- Also known as: The Extra Glenns
- Origin: California
- Genres: Lo-fi music; indie rock
- Years active: 1992–1996, 1998, 2000–2004, 2010
- Labels: Shrimper; Harriet; Absolutely Kosher; Merge
- Members: Franklin Bruno; John Darnielle

The Extra Lens, formerly known as The Extra Glenns, is a band made up of Franklin Bruno (of Nothing Painted Blue and The Human Hearts) and John Darnielle (of the Mountain Goats). The band acts as a side project for both artists, and stayed underground throughout the 1990s, recording tracks for singles and some compilations. Both artists primarily concentrate on their own solo work, though as their popularity has grown, they have continued to work together.

In the early 2000s, the duo decided to keep the project going, and in 2002 Absolutely Kosher Records released Martial Arts Weekend, their first full-length album.

In August 2010, it was announced that The Extra Glenns had signed to Merge Records and changed their name to The Extra Lens. The new album, Undercard, was released on October 19, 2010. SPIN Magazine gave the record 7 out of 10 stars, calling it "vivid" and "haunting."

== Discography ==
Infidelity

- Released: 1993
- Format: 7-inch Record
- Label: Harriet
- Writers: Franklin Bruno, John Darnielle
- Tracks: "Infidelity", "Going to Lubbock", "Malevolent Cityscape X"

Martial Arts Weekend

- Released: 2002
- Format: CD
- Label: Absolutely Kosher
- Writers: Franklin Bruno, John Darnielle
- Tracks: "Baltimore", "All Rooms Cable A/C Free Coffee", "Ultra Violet", "Twelve Hands High", "The River Song", "Somebody Else's Parking Lot in Sebastopol", "Memories" (Leonard Cohen cover), "Going to Morocco", "Going to Michigan", "Terminal Grain", "Malevolent Seascape Y", "Going to Marrakesh"

Undercard

- Released: 2010
- Format: CD
- Label: Merge
- Writers: Franklin Bruno, John Darnielle
- Tracks: "Adultery", "Cruiserweights", "Only Existing Footage", "Communicating Doors", "Programmed Cell Death", "How I Left the Ministry", "Some Other Way", "Ambivalent Landscape Z", "In Germany Before the War" (Randy Newman cover), "Tug on the Line", "Rockin’ Rockin’ Twilight of the Gods", "Dogs of Clinic 17"

== Compilation appearances ==
- "Badger Song" and "That" - High Fly Graveyard cassette (Shrimper, 1992)
- "Badger Song" - Abridged Perversion CD (Shrimper, 1994)
- "I Hear the Planets" - Fantasy Band 7-inch EP (Shrimper, 1994)
- "Process of Elimination" - The Long Secret CD (Harriet, 1995)
- "Sure" - Sidereal Rest CD (Scratch, 1996)
- "Gravedigger" - Extra Walt 2×7″ (Walt, 1996)
