= A Chronicle of the Last Pagans =

1990 book by Pierre Chuvin]

- Author: Pierre Chuvin
- Original title: Chronique des derniers païens
- Translator: B. A. Archer
- Subject: Classical antiquity
- Publisher: Les Belles Lettres/Fayard
- Publication date: 1990
- English publication date: 1990
- Pages: 188

A Chronicle of the Last Pagans is a 1990 popular history book on pagan retreat in the Roman Empire, written by historian Pierre Chuvin and published by Harvard University Press.

== Legacy ==
The book inspired the 2020 lo-fi album Songs for Pierre Chuvin by the Mountain Goats.
