= All Eternals Deck =

Studio album by the Mountain Goats
- Released: March 29, 2011
- Recorded: 2010
- Studio: Mana Recording Studios in St. Petersburg, Florida; Fidelitorium in Kernersville, North Carolina; Q Division in Somerville, Massachusetts; and Mission Sound in Brooklyn, New York
- Genre: Indie rock, folk rock
- Length: 42:15
- Label: Merge Records
- Producer: Brandon Eggleston, John Congleton, Scott Solter, Erik Rutan

The Mountain Goats chronology
The Life of the World to Come (2009)	All Eternals Deck (2011)	Transcendental Youth (2012)

Professional ratings
Aggregate scores
Source	Rating
Metacritic	77/100
Review scores
Source	Rating
AllMusic	4/5 stars
Crackle Feedback	(8/10)
Pitchfork	8.1/10
Slant Magazine	4/5 stars
Spin	7/10
Tiny Mix Tapes	4/5 stars

All Eternals Deck is the thirteenth studio album by the Mountain Goats, released on March 29, 2011 by Merge Records. "All Eternals Deck" refers to a fictional set of Tarot cards, the history and details of which are described in the album's liner notes. All Eternals Deck is the third consecutive Mountain Goats studio album to feature the Mountain Goats as a trio of John Darnielle, Peter Hughes and Jon Wurster. The album peaked at No. 72 on the Billboard 200 albums on its chart debut. A companion release, All Survivors Pack, was issued as a limited cassette with initial pre-orders of the album, which contained 12 demo recordings—demo versions of 10 album tracks plus two non-album outtakes from the All Eternals Deck sessions.

== Track listing ==
All tracks are written by John Darnielle.

All Eternals Deck
No.	Title	Length
1.	"Damn These Vampires"	3:24
2.	"Birth of Serpents"	3:08
3.	"Estate Sale Sign"	2:47
4.	"Age of Kings"	4:13
5.	"The Autopsy Garland"	2:50
6.	"Beautiful Gas Mask"	3:52
7.	"High Hawk Season"	2:56
8.	"Prowl Great Cain"	3:15
9.	"Sourdoire Valley Song"	3:38
10.	"Outer Scorpion Squadron"	2:31
11.	"For Charles Bronson"	3:01
12.	"Never Quite Free"	3:30
13.	"Liza Forever Minnelli"	3:10
Total length:		42:15

Australian bonus track
No.	Title	Length
14.	"Brisbane Hotel Sutra"	2:39
Total length:		46:04

Japanese bonus track
No.	Title	Length
14.	"Used to Haunt"	2:46
Total length:		46:11

All Survivors Pack – limited edition demos cassette tape
No.	Title	Length
1.	"Catherine Antrim's Kid"
2.	"Beautiful Gas Mask"
3.	"Birth of Serpents"
4.	"The Autopsy Garland"
5.	"Estate Sale Sign"
6.	"Rotten Stinking Mouthpiece"
7.	"Sourdoire Valley Song"
8.	"Age of Kings"
9.	"High Hawk Season"
10.	"Never Quite Free"
11.	"For Charles Bronson"
12.	"Liza Forever Minnelli"

John Darnielle revealed in a concert on October 13, 2012 at the Music Hall of Williamsburg that not only is "Rotten Stinking Mouthpiece" his 'secret favorite song', but that it is about Lon Chaney Jr. and was inspired by his movie Indestructible Man. "Rotten Stinking Mouthpiece", along with "Catherine Antrim's Kid" is one of two songs not on the original album, but available on All Survivors Pack.

== Personnel ==
- John Darnielle – vocals, guitar, keyboard
- Peter Hughes – bass, backing vocals
- Jon Wurster – drums
- Yoed Nir – cello
- Yuval Semo – organ, piano, string arrangements
- Bob Barone – steel guitar
- Brandon Eggleston – production, mixing
- Erik Rutan – production
- John Congleton – production, mixing
- Scott Solter – production, mixing
- Brent Lambert – mastering
- Marc Bessant – graphic design
- Artbeats – photography
