= Pierre Chuvin =

French philologist

Pierre Chuvin (18 July 1943 – 26 December 2016) was a French hellenist and historian. He specialized in ancient Greece and Greek mythology, as well as modern Central Asia and the Turkic-speaking world.

== Biography ==
He studied at the Université de Clermont-Ferrand under Francis Vian and the École nationale des langues orientales vivantes, where he learned modern Greek and Turkish, and did an agrégation on classical literature. In 1983 he presented his doctoral thesis on the ancient Greek epic Dionysiaca by Nonnus.

He was a professor at the Blaise Pascal University until 1998 and after that at the Paris Nanterre University. He created and led the Institut français d'études sur l'Asie centrale in Tashkent, Uzbekistan, and founded the journal Les Cahiers de l'Asie centrale. From 2003 to 2008 he was the director of the Institut français d'études anatoliennes in Istanbul.

He wrote more than 70 articles for the magazine L'Histoire.

== Legacy ==
In April 2020, the American band the Mountain Goats released an album entitled Songs for Pierre Chuvin, inspired by Chuvin's 1990 book A Chronicle of the Last Pagans.

== Selected publications ==
- Mythologie et géographie dionysiaques : recherches sur l'œuvre de Nonnos de Panopolis, Clermont-Ferrand, Adosa, 1992 (doctorat d'État thesis). Prix Saintour de l'Académie des inscriptions et belles-lettres, 1994.
- L'Islam au péril des femmes. Une Anglaise en Turquie au XVIIIe siècle (lettres de Lady Montagu), translation and presentation with Anne-Marie Moulin, Maspéro/La Découverte, 1981.
- Chronique des derniers païens. La disparition du paganisme dans l'Empire romain, du règne de Constantin à celui de Justinien, éd. Les Belles Lettres, 1990
- Mythologie grecque. Du premier homme à l'apothéose d'Héraclès, éd. Fayard, 1992. Prix François Millepierres de l'Académie française, 1993.
- L'Asie centrale. L'indépendance, le pétrole et l'islam, with Pierre Gentelle, Le Monde éditions / Marabout, 1998
- Les Arts de l’Asie centrale, éd. Citadelles-Mazenod, 1999 (editor)
- Samarcande Boukhara Khiva, éd., Flammarion, 2001, with photographs by Gérard Degeorge.
- Turquie, éd. Larousse, 2003 (collaboration)
- Des Géants à Dionysos. Mélanges de religion et poésie grecques en l'honneur du professeur Francis Vian, 2003
- Pitres et pantins. Transformations du masque comique : de l'Antiquité au théâtre d'ombres, co-edited with Sophie Basch, PUPS, 2007.
- Histoire de l'Asie centrale contemporaine, with René Létolle and Sébastien Peyrouse, Fayard, 2008.
- L'Orientalisme, les orientalistes et l'Empire ottoman, de la fin du XVIIe siècle à la fin du XXe siècle, co-edited with Sophie Basch, Nora Sens, Michel Espagne and Jean Leclant, Académie des inscriptions et belles-lettres/De Boccard, 2011.

=== English editions ===
- A Chronicle of the Last Pagans, Harvard University Press, 1990.
- Samarkand, Bukara, Khiva, Thames & Hudson, 2003.
