= Nine Black Poppies =

EP by the Mountain Goats
- Released: October 24, 1995
- Recorded: June 1995
- Genre: Lo-fi
- Length: 22:19
- Label: Emperor Jones
- Producer: John Darnielle

Professional ratings
Review scores
Source	Rating
Allmusic	4.5/5 stars

Nine Black Poppies is an EP by the Mountain Goats.

== Reception ==
CMJ New Music Monthly said, "the title track is heart-wrenchingly sad, with an emotional starkness rare on Mountain Goats records. More ambitious musically, the EP also offers Chris Knox-style keyboards on "Pure Money" and phoned-in (literally) vocals from Refrigerator singer Allan Callaci on "Lonesome Surprise."

== Track listing ==
All tracks are written by John Darnielle, except where noted.

No.	Title	Length
1.	"Cubs in Five"	2:05
2.	"Going to Utrecht"	2:59
3.	"Cheshire County"	1:53
4.	"Chanson du Bon Chose"	3:00
5.	"Pure Money"	2:02
6.	"I Know You've Come to Take My Toys Away"	2:10
7.	"Nine Black Poppies"	3:05
8.	"Stars Fell on Alabama"	2:42
9.	"Lonesome Surprise" (Refrigerator)	2:23
Total length:		22:19
