= No Children =

Song by The Mountain Goats

from the album Tallahassee
- Released: 2002
- Genre: Indie rock
- Length: 2:48
- Label: 4AD
- Songwriter: John Darnielle
- Producer: Tony Doogan

Music video
- "No Children" on YouTube

"No Children" is a 2002 song by American band the Mountain Goats from their album Tallahassee, about a married couple who hate each other. Songwriter John Darnielle said that he is "not laughing with (the characters in the song)" but rather "laughing at them."

== Composition and recording ==
"No Children" was written by John Darnielle for the album Tallahassee, a concept album about the troubled relationship of the "Alpha Couple." He said "There was a song on the charts called "I Hope You Dance" (by Lee Ann Womack). And I hated this song, a lot. I really try not to be as big a hater as I used to be, but I just hated everything about this song. And so I’m driving to Des Moines and I ad-libbed "I hope you die" over "I hope you dance." I thought, that’s funny — I should have my alpha couple say that to each other. And then I patterned the whole composition of it after that but from a spiteful perspective."

Darnielle wrote the song over about six to eight months while he worked for Lutheran Social Services, providing support for children without suitable parental care. In 2020, Darnielle told NPR that in the song he is "caring a lot about children" and "feeling some of my characters' glee. But I'm also placing myself in a position of judgment, trying to make sure that the fact that these are not people you want to be around is clear."

The track contains a piano line played by Franklin Bruno. Live renditions feature drums played by Jon Wurster in 6/8 time.

== Reception ==
The A.V. Club stated that it is "the most cheerful song you'll ever hear about two people who would kill each other if they could just work up the energy to do it". Pitchfork Media noted its "bright piano line" and its "delightfully/horrifically bitter singalong chorus"; similarly, The Quietus cited it as an example of Darnielle's ability to "somehow remain uplifting despite oppressively heavy lyrics".

Stephen Thompson has called it "one of (his) favorite songs of all time", while emphasizing that it is one of the least appropriate songs to play at a wedding. Stereogum observed that it has become a "shoutalong favorite" at live performances.

Orlando Weekly described it as an "unforgettably brutal anthem", while Deadspin praised it as a "gripping standout" (among the songs on Tallahassee).

== Legacy ==
By about 2007, "No Children" became a staple of the Mountain Goats' live performances, often with the audience singing along. In 2018, the song was covered live by Julien Baker; Darnielle said that this was "the best version of the song," praising her tenderness.

In 2008, the song was featured as the opening and closing theme on the premiere of the third and final season of Moral Orel on the episode "Numb", in which the song plays when the titular character’s parents, Clay and Bloberta, grow to be even more resentful of each other as they sleep in separate beds. It also features in the 2019 series finale of You're the Worst, playing over a montage of the characters' lives after the show's end. The song echoes the two main characters' unorthodox romance.

In the fall of 2021, the song became a viral hit on the online video platform TikTok, which Darnielle has acknowledged during live performances. In August 2026, the song became the Mountain Goats' first gold record.
