= A Cat May Look at a Queen =

Studio album by Franklin Bruno
- Released: 14 October 2002 (UK); 15 October 2002 (US)
- Studio: Wavelab Studio, Tucson, Arizona; Kingsize Soundlabs, Los Angeles
- Genre: Folk rock, singer-songwriter
- Label: Absolutely Kosher
- Producer: Craig Schumacher, Dave Trumfio, Michael Krassner, Nick Luca

Franklin Bruno chronology
Kiss Without Makeup (2000)	A Cat May Look at a Queen (2002)	Set of Pipes (2003)

Professional ratings
Review scores
Source	Rating
PopMatters	favourable

A Cat May Look at a Queen is an album by Franklin Bruno. It was released in October 2002 on the Absolutely Kosher label.

== Track listing ==
Source: Allmusic All tracks composed by Franklin Bruno; except where noted.

No.	Title	Writer(s)	Length
1.	"Dashboard Issues"		5:12
2.	"Lies on Your Lips"		3:56
3.	"Janet Shaw"		5:46
4.	"I Blame You"		3:50
5.	"Tired of the West"		4:39
6.	"Threadbare"		4:15
7.	"A Cat May Look at a Queen"		3:33
8.	"Bulk Removal Truck"		6:05
9.	"Callous"		4:43
10.	"Dossier"		5:34
11.	"Love's Got a Ghetto"		3:38
12.	"Two Purple Shadows"	Dick Sanford, Sammy Mysels	3:27
13.	"Blue's the Only Color"		3:40

== Personnel ==
- Franklin Bruno – electric guitar, synthesizer, piano, organ, keyboards, sampler, vibraphone, grand piano, tapes
- Joey Burns – guitar, baritone guitar, vibraphone, shaker, cello (tracks 1–5, 9, 11, 12)
- Daniel Brodo – double bass (tracks 1–6, 9–12)
- Tommy Larkins – drums (tracks 1–5, 9, 11, 12)
- Stefan George – dobro, lap steel guitar (tracks 2, 9)
- Amy Domingues – cello (tracks 7, 8)
- Winston Watson – bongos (track 11)
- Craig Schumacher – harmonica, harmony vocals (tracks 9, 12)
- Bill Magdziarz – synthesizer (track 1)
- Jacob Valenzuela – trumpet (track 4)
