= Sweden (album) =

Studio album by the Mountain Goats
- Released: August 7, 1995
- Recorded: Winter 1994–1995
- Genre: Lo-fi
- Length: 45:19
- Label: Shrimper Records
- Producer: John Darnielle

The Mountain Goats chronology
Zopilote Machine (1994)	Sweden (1995)	Nothing for Juice (1996)

Professional ratings
Review scores
Source	Rating
Allmusic	4/5 stars
PunkNews.org	4/5 stars

Sweden is the second studio album by the Mountain Goats, which was released on Shrimper Records in August 1995. This incarnation of the Mountain Goats consisted of John Darnielle as singer/songwriter/guitarist and Rachel Ware as bassist and backup singer. It was produced by Darnielle himself, and largely recorded with Darnielle's Panasonic RX-FT500, his trademark lo-fi production method during this period. The relationship of the album to the country of Sweden appears to be largely symbolic and esoteric; the album is a song cycle about a couple in a loving but doomed relationship, but according to Darnielle, this couple is not his notorious 'Alpha Couple'. All the songs relate to this relationship, even “Tollund Man", in which the narrator is ostensibly the famed Tollund Man, a Scandinavian man that was prepared for human sacrifice in the fourth century BCE.

== Reception ==
CMJ New Music Monthly said, "The duo's new record, while not churned out, suffers from a second-hand feel. Chord progressions on a few tracks are recycled from previous songs; the lyrics are moving away from the humor of earlier records. New isn't always bad, however: born again as a bassist, Rachel Ware spoons Darnielle's simple guitar in an imprecise but comfortable fit." AllMusic said, "Darnielle works wonders of condensation, creating lively, complex characters in less than three minutes. Among the best of the early releases from the Mountain Goats."

== Track listing ==
All tracks are written by John Darnielle, except where noted.

No.	Title	Swedish alternative title	Length
1.	"The Recognition Scene"	"Vi var på väg hem före regnet" (We Were On Our Way Home Before the Rain)	2:50
2.	"Downtown Seoul"	"Han är yngre än jag" (He Is Younger Than I)	2:53
3.	"Some Swedish Trees"	"De flyende var oskyldiga" (The Fleeing Ones Were Innocent)	2:05
4.	"I Wonder Where Our Love Has Gone" (Buddy Johnson)	"Inga gröna löv" (No Green Leaves)	2:35
5.	"Deianara Crush"	"Är du inte min vän?" (Are You Not My Friend?)	1:53
6.	"Whole Wide World"	"Fast han hade förändrats så mycket kände jag genast igen honom" (Though He Had Changed So Much I Immediately Recognized Him)	2:13
7.	"Flashing Lights"	"Den kallaste vintern" (The Coldest Winter)	2:30
8.	"Sept 19 Triple X Love! Love!"	"Vi gör vad vi kan" (We Do What We Can)	2:24
9.	"Going to Queens"	"Vi visste inte vad som skulle hända" (We Did Not Know What Was Going to Happen)	2:26
10.	"Tahitian Ambrosia Maker"	"Han har känt igen dig" (He Has Recognized You)	1:47
11.	"Going to Bolivia"	"Huset var vackert beläget, vilket gjorde mig väldigt glad" (The House Was Beautifully Situated, Which Made Me Very Glad)	1:37
12.	"Tollund Man"	"Han sov tydligen" (He Was Apparently Sleeping)	2:34
13.	"California Song"	"Flickan som var hans vän sa adjö" (The Girl Who Was His Friend Said Goodbye)	1:55
14.	"Snow Crush Killing Song"	"Huset brändes ner utav den unga mannen" (The House Was Burned Down by the Young Man)	2:46
15.	"Send Me an Angel"	"Han är lika trött som jag" (He Is As Tired As I)	1:47
16.	"Neon Orange Glimmer Song"	"Vi träffas på gatan i morgon" (We Will Meet on the Street Tomorrow)	3:08
17.	"FM" (Steely Dan)	"En vit klänning" (A White Dress)	1:45
18.	"Prana Ferox"	"De gjorde det själva" (They Did It Themselves)	4:05
19.	"Cold Milk Bottle"	"Jag skall tala i kväll" (I Will Speak This Evening)	2:06
Total length:			45:19

== Notes ==
Despite the title, cover, Swedish alternative titles, and the humorous mini-essay about "The Swedish conspiracy" in the liner notes (written by Paul Lukas, though he was only credited a year later in the liner notes to the band's next release Nothing for Juice), none of the lyrics are explicitly about Sweden itself. Various other locations, such as Seoul, Korea, California, Queens, New York City, Bolivia and Denmark are however all mentioned in the songs. "Duke Ellington" (which appears on the rarities compilation Protein Source of the Future...Now! and the Harriet records compilation The Long Secret), which does mention Sweden, is described as "one of two pieces written for the song-cycle Sweden and intentionally left off of the album". The unreleased "I've Got the Sex" is the other song intended for Sweden that was left off of the album. According to Darnielle this song was originally supposed to be the first track of Sweden, but was left off due to Darnielle accidentally forgetting its tape at home during the mastering process. In addition, there exists a sequel album to Sweden, entitled Hail and Farewell, Gothenburg, but it was never released. Furthermore, at a December 2010 concert at the Castro Theater in San Francisco, California, Darnielle unveiled 6 more songs from the "Sweden notebooks".

The coda of "Cold Milk Bottle" is taken directly from "Mean to Me," a popular song from 1929, written by Fred E. Ahlert and Roy Turk and performed by artists including Billie Holliday, Sarah Vaughan, Judy Garland, Frank Sinatra, Rosemary Clooney, and Ella Fitzgerald.

== Personnel ==
- John Darnielle – vocals, guitar
- Rachel Ware – bass, vocals
