= Nothing for Juice =

Studio album by the Mountain Goats
- Released: August 19, 1996
- Recorded: 1996
- Genre: Lo-fi
- Length: 44:57
- Label: Ajax
- Producer: John Darnielle

The Mountain Goats chronology
Sweden (1995)	Nothing for Juice (1996)	Full Force Galesburg (1997)

Professional ratings
Review scores
Source	Rating
AllMusic	4/5 stars
Alternative Press	(favourable)

Nothing for Juice is the third studio album by the Mountain Goats. It is the last Mountain Goats release to feature Rachel Ware on bass and backing vocals. New Zealand musician Graeme Jefferies plays guitar on three of the songs.

== Track listing ==
No.	Title	Length
1.	"Then the Letting Go"	1:51
2.	"Heights"	2:28
3.	"Alpha Double Negative: Going to Catalina"	2:33
4.	"Hellhound on My Trail"	2:46
5.	"Blueberry Frost"	1:43
6.	"Alabama Nova"	1:45
7.	"Moon and Sand"	3:33
8.	"I Will Grab You by the Ears"	1:51
9.	"It Froze Me"	2:07
10.	"Full Flower"	2:12
11.	"Million"	2:24
12.	"Going to Bogotá"	2:48
13.	"Orange Ball of Pain"	3:24
14.	"Going to Kansas"	3:55
15.	"Waving at You"	2:29
16.	"Going to Reykjavík"	2:45
17.	"I Corinthians 13: 8-10"	2:16
18.	"Going to Scotland"	2:07
Total length:		44:57

== Notes ==
Several outtakes from the album circulate amongst collectors, including 'Radical Evil Song', 'Etiquette Song', 'Something Blue', 'Pure Crystal', 'Going to Buffalo', 'Flower Song', 'Going to Detroit', and 'I Meant Every Word I Said in New Delhi'.

== Personnel ==
- John Darnielle - vocals, guitar
- Rachel Ware - bass, vocals

== Release history ==
Date	Label	Format	Catalogue number
19 August 1996	Ajax Records	CD, LP	AJAX 056
29 March 2005	3 Beads of Sweat	CD	3BOS 1007
