= Songs for Pierre Chuvin =

Studio album by the Mountain Goats
- Released: April 10, 2020
- Recorded: March 2020
- Genre: Lo-fi
- Length: 27:17
- Label: Merge Records
- Producer: John Darnielle

The Mountain Goats chronology
In League with Dragons (2019)	Songs for Pierre Chuvin (2020)	Getting into Knives (2020)

Songs for Pierre Chuvin is the eighteenth studio album by the Mountain Goats, released on April 10, 2020. It is the first album since 2002's All Hail West Texas to feature only the band's frontman, John Darnielle, as well as the first since then to be recorded entirely on a boombox. The album was first released on cassette and digital, with CD and vinyl releases following in 2021.

Songs for Pierre Chuvin was recorded during the COVID-19 pandemic in an effort to help the band and some of their crew make ends meet in lieu of a postponed tour in the United States. Inspiration for the songs, as well as the album's title, largely came from French historian Pierre Chuvin's book A Chronicle of the Last Pagans. Darnielle recorded the tracks over a 10-day period in March 2020, releasing the songs "Exegetic Chains", "Until Olympius Returns", and "For the Snakes" on the band's YouTube channel prior to the full release.

== Reception ==
Professional ratings
Review scores
Source	Rating
Pitchfork	8.1/10
Exclaim!	8/10
Tom Hull	B+

The online magazine Pitchfork rated Songs for Pierre Chuvin 8.1 out of 10, calling the album "a brief but thoughtful collection marked by old-school production". The album has a score of 80 on Metacritic, indicating 'generally favorable reviews' but on the cusp of 'universal acclaim'.

== Track listing ==
All tracks are written by John Darnielle.

Songs for Pierre Chuvin track listing
No.	Title	Length
1.	"Aulon Raid"	2:13
2.	"Until Olympius Returns"	2:12
3.	"Last Gasp at Calama"	1:58
4.	"For the Snakes"	2:09
5.	"The Wooded Hills Along the Black Sea"	2:57
6.	"January 31, 438"	2:22
7.	"Hopeful Assassins of Zeno"	3:15
8.	"Their Gods Do Not Have Surgeons"	3:34
9.	"Going to Lebanon 2"	2:26
10.	"Exegetic Chains"	4:11
Total length:		27:17

== Charts ==
Chart performance for Songs for Pierre Chuvin
Chart (2020)	Peak position
Australian Albums (ARIA)	86
Scottish Albums (Official Charts)	13
US Billboard 200	152
US Top Alternative Albums (Billboard)	7
US Americana/Folk Albums (Billboard)	4
US Independent Albums (Billboard)	19
US Top Rock Albums (Billboard)	23
