= The Sunset Tree =

2005 studio album by The Mountain Goats

Studio album by the Mountain Goats
- Released: April 26, 2005
- Recorded: November 4, 2004 – November 15, 2004
- Studios: Prairie Sun, Cotati, California
- Genre: Folk rock
- Length: 39:34
- Label: 4AD
- Producer: John Vanderslice

The Mountain Goats chronology
We Shall All Be Healed (2004)	The Sunset Tree (2005)	Get Lonely (2006)

The Sunset Tree is the ninth studio album by the Mountain Goats, released on April 26, 2005 by 4AD. The album's songs revolve around the house John Darnielle grew up in and the people who lived there, including his mother, sister, stepfather, friends, and enemies. The Sunset Tree received notable acclaim from critics, and was instrumental in introducing the Mountain Goats to a wider, mainstream audience. A prominent review of The Sunset Tree in The New York Times called the album 'extraordinary', and The New Yorker's rock critic, Sasha Frere-Jones, pronounced Darnielle as 'America's best non-hip-hop lyricist' in an essay in May 2005.

In October 2025, more than twenty years after the album's release, Paste named The Sunset Tree the 50th greatest album of the 21st Century, in their list of 'The 250 Greatest Albums of the 21st Century So Far'. The same day, 4AD released a remastered 20th-anniversary edition of the album, which GQ described as the band's best-selling record.

== Background and themes ==
Whereas the Mountain Goats' previous album We Shall All Be Healed explored Darnielle's late teenage and early young adult years involved with other methamphetamine users, on The Sunset Tree Darnielle looks further back to focus on his childhood and high school years, and domestic violence emerges as a central recurring theme. The album title refers to a scene in Samuel Butler's The Way of All Flesh in which the character Theobald beats his son Ernest for being unable to pronounce a hard C when singing a hymn. The hymn, "The Tyrolese Evening Hymn", begins with the lines "Come, come, come, Come to the sunset tree."

Darnielle began writing songs for the album while the Mountain Goats were on tour in Europe in early 2004, a few months after the death of his stepfather Mike Noonan. He composed "Dance Music", "Magpie", "Hast Thou Considered the Tetrapod", and at least one other song on April 8, 2004, the day before a Peel Session at BBC Maida Vale Studios, where they performed early versions of the new material. Darnielle later reflected that he wrote the album in place of seeking therapy following his stepfather's death.

In the album's liner notes, Darnielle writes:

"Made possible by my stepfather, Mike Noonan (1940–2004): may the peace which eluded you in life be yours now
Dedicated to any young men and women anywhere who live with people who abuse them, with the following good news:
you are going to make it out of there alive
you will live to tell your story
never lose hope"

Many lyrics reference Darnielle's abusive childhood, especially in the songs "This Year", "Dance Music", and "Hast Thou Considered the Tetrapod". While the album's subject matter is often somber, dealing with Darnielle's longing for escape and feelings of powerlessness, many songs feature upbeat tempos and energetic arrangements that contrast with their lyrical content. The album also explores related themes of adolescent romance, substance abuse, and the coping mechanisms of youth navigating traumatic circumstances. The emotional arc builds toward the song "Lion's Teeth", which Darnielle has described as a "revenge fantasy" in an introduction to a live performance of the song.

The album concludes with the two final songs "Love Love Love", in which Darnielle notes the virtue and folly of doing things for reasons of love, and "Pale Green Things", in which he recalls a time his stepfather took him out to watch horses at a racetrack. Darnielle closes the song and the album with a lyric about his sister calling him to inform him of his stepfather's death.

== Reception ==
Professional ratings
Aggregate scores
Source	Rating
Metacritic	83/100
Review scores
Source	Rating
AllMusic	4.5/5 stars
Blender	4/5 stars
Entertainment Weekly	B
The Irish Times	4/5 stars
Mojo	3/5 stars
NME	6/10
Pitchfork	7.2/10
Rolling Stone	3/5 stars
Spin	B+
Uncut	4/5 stars

The Sunset Tree has a metascore of 83 on Metacritic based on 28 reviews, which indicates "universal acclaim". Pitchfork placed The Sunset Tree at number 102 on their list of top 200 albums of the 2000s.

== Track listing ==
All tracks are written by John Darnielle.

No.	Title	Length
1.	"You or Your Memory"	2:15
2.	"Broom People"	2:44
3.	"This Year"	3:52
4.	"Dilaudid"	2:10
5.	"Dance Music"	1:57
6.	"Dinu Lipatti's Bones"	3:18
7.	"Up the Wolves"	3:27
8.	"Lion's Teeth"	3:25
9.	"Hast Thou Considered the Tetrapod"	3:22
10.	"Magpie"	2:00
11.	"Song for Dennis Brown"	3:57
12.	"Love Love Love"	2:48
13.	"Pale Green Things"	4:19
Total length:		39:34

Come, Come to the Sunset Tree - bonus limited edition demos LP
No.	Title	Length
1.	"You or Your Memory"	2:30
2.	"Up the Wolves"	3:43
3.	"Dilaudid"	2:07
4.	"Collapsing Stars"	2:21
5.	"Dinu Lipatti's Bones"	2:30
6.	"Love Love Love"	2:32
7.	"High Doses #2"	3:02
8.	"Lions Teeth"	3:55
9.	"This Year"	3:44
10.	"Song for Dennis Brown"	3:01
11.	"The Day The Aliens Came"	3:31
Total length:		32:56

== Personnel ==
- John Darnielle – vocals, guitar
- Peter Hughes – bass, backing vocals
- Erik Friedlander – cello
- Alex Decarville – drums
- Franklin Bruno – piano
- John Vanderslice – production
- Scott Solter – engineering
- Aaron Prellwitz – engineering
- Timin Murray – engineering
