= Tallahassee (album) =

Studio album by the Mountain Goats
- Released: November 5, 2002
- Recorded: Tarbox Studios (Cassadaga, New York, US)
- Genre: Folk rock
- Length: 44:35
- Label: 4AD
- Producer: Tony Doogan

The Mountain Goats chronology
All Hail West Texas (2002)	Tallahassee (2002)	We Shall All Be Healed (2004)

Singles from Tallahassee
- 1. "See America Right" Released: November 25, 2002

Tallahassee is the seventh studio album by the Mountain Goats. It was the band's second new album to be released in 2002, and it marked quite a few changes. After releasing records (and cassettes) on small record labels such as Shrimper, Ajax, and Emperor Jones, Tallahassee was the first Mountain Goats album to be released on a widely known independent label, the British alternative rock label 4AD. It was also the first Mountain Goats album to have an official single released, for the song "See America Right."

Tallahassee is the first record to feature what could be considered a full "band," with fuller instrumentation and a percussion section. Up to this point, most recordings under the Mountain Goats name had either been solo recordings by leader John Darnielle or higher-quality recordings featuring Rachel Ware on bass, and other supporting instrumentalists. On Tallahassee, Darnielle was joined by two past collaborators, multi-instrumentalists Peter Hughes and Franklin Bruno. It was co-produced, recorded, and mixed by producer Tony Doogan at Tarbox Studios in Cassadaga, New York, assisted by Michael Ivins of The Flaming Lips. The album was recorded in six days.

== Story ==
Tallahassee is completely devoted to two of Darnielle's recurring characters, a married couple constantly on the edge of divorce. As such, the lyrics tend to focus on the dysfunction in their relationship. The couple is known to fans as "the Alpha Couple," as many of the previous songs about them have titles beginning with the word "Alpha" (e.g. "Alpha Incipiens," "Alpha Desperation March"). The final song on the album is titled "Alpha Rats Nest" as a nod of sorts to the other songs.

In the songs on this album, the Alpha Couple move into a house on Southwood Plantation Road in Tallahassee, Florida. The house is falling apart, a metaphor for their crumbling marriage. Sick of themselves and each other, yet unwilling to part, they begin drinking themselves to death.

The album's liner notes, presumably written from the husband's point of view, add another dimension to the story, as does the album's (now defunct) promotional website, written by Darnielle and designed by his wife Lalitree.

== Reception ==
Professional ratings
Review scores
Source	Rating
AllMusic	4.5/5 stars
The Guardian	4/5 stars
Los Angeles Times	3.5/4 stars
Mojo	4/5 stars
Now	4/5
Pitchfork	6.7/10
Rolling Stone	3/5 stars
Spin	9/10
Uncut	3/5 stars
The Village Voice	A

Veteran rock critic Robert Christgau of the Village Voice gave the album an 'A' grade in his first review of a Mountain Goats album; The Guardian and Mojo also wrote glowing reviews. The album also received positive reviews from websites such as PopMatters and Dusted. Although the online music magazine Pitchfork gave Tallahassee a mixed review upon release, stating that "Darnielle's apparent phobia for full-band arrangements prevents the music from keeping pace with the storylines", it later included the album at number 176 on their 2009 list of top 200 albums of the 2000s.

The songs "No Children" and "Old College Try" were featured in the Moral Orel episodes "Numb" and "Help" respectively. The song "No Children" was also featured in the series finale of You're the Worst.

In 2021, "No Children" became a meme on TikTok where people performed a choreographed interpretive dance to the lyrics of the chorus.

== Track listing ==
All tracks are written by John Darnielle.

Tallahassee track listing
No.	Title	Length
1.	"Tallahassee"	4:43
2.	"First Few Desperate Hours"	3:03
3.	"Southwood Plantation Road"	2:45
4.	"Game Shows Touch Our Lives"	3:48
5.	"The House That Dripped Blood"	2:53
6.	"Idylls of the King"	3:32
7.	"No Children"	2:48
8.	"See America Right"	1:52
9.	"Peacocks"	3:43
10.	"International Small Arms Traffic Blues"	2:50
11.	"Have to Explode"	3:21
12.	"Old College Try"	2:52
13.	"Oceanographer's Choice"	4:08
14.	"Alpha Rats Nest"	2:10
Total length:		44:34

== Personnel ==
- John Darnielle: guitar, vocal, bells, keys, xylophone, harmonica
- Peter Hughes: bass, guitar, harmony vocal, drums, keys, shaker
- Franklin Bruno: guitar on "See America Right," piano on "Have to Explode" and "No Children"
- Michael Ivins: tambourine on "Southwood Plantation Road"
