= Undercard (album) =

Studio album by The Extra Lens
- Released: 2010
- Genre: Indie rock, folk
- Label: Merge Records

The Extra Lens chronology
| Martial Arts Weekend (2002) | Undercard (2010) |

Professional ratings
Aggregate scores
| Source | Rating |
|---|---|
| Metacritic | (77%) |
Review scores
| Source | Rating |
| AllMusic | 3.5/5 stars |
| Robert Christgau | A− |
| Pitchfork | 7.9/10 |
| SPIN | 7/10 stars |
| Tiny Mix Tapes | 3/5 stars |

Undercard is an album by indie-rock band The Extra Lens, a side-project of John Darnielle and Franklin Bruno. The album was released on October 19, 2010.

== Production ==
Darnielle recorded his parts, after which Bruno added more instrumentation.

== Reception ==
Reception to Undercard was generally positive, according to review aggregator Metacritic.

PopMatters wrote that "not all of the compositions here reach their potential, but Bruno almost consistently nails his efforts to create the right mood for Darnielle’s storytelling."

== Track listing ==
1. "Adultery"
2. "Cruiserweights"
3. "Only Existing Footage"
4. "Communicating Doors"
5. "Programmed Cell Death"
6. "How I Left the Ministry"
7. "Some Other Way"
8. "Ambivalent Landscape Z"
9. "In Germany Before the War" (Randy Newman cover)
10. "Tug on the Line"
11. "Rockin’ Rockin’ Twilight of the Gods"
12. "Dogs of Clinic 17"
