= The Ocean Party =

Australian indie rock band (2009–2019)

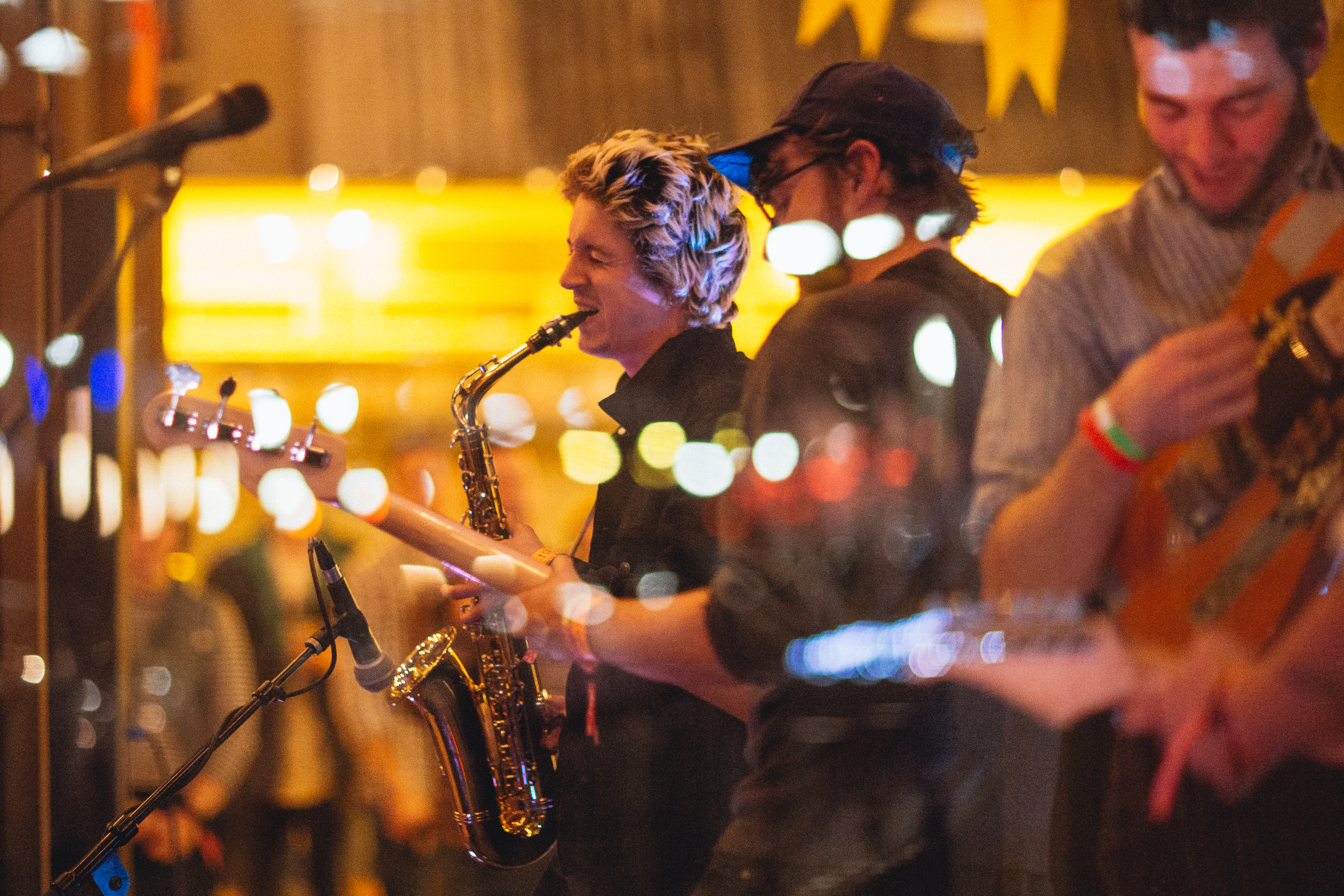
- Three of the band members on stage, from left to right: Liam Halliwell, Mark Rogers and Zac Denton

Background information
- Origin: Wagga Wagga, New South Wales, Australia
- Genres: Indie rock, indie pop, experimental pop
- Years active: 2009–2019
- Labels: Spunk, Emotional Response, Sound of Melbourne
- Past members: Lachlan Denton; Curtis Wakeling; Liam Halliwell; Jordan Thompson; Mark Rogers; Nick Kearton (touring); Ben Protasiewicz; Simon Lam; Zac Denton

The Ocean Party were an Australian indie rock band from Wagga Wagga, New South Wales and based in Melbourne. Formed in 2009, the band's final line-up consisted of Lachlan Denton on drums, Curtis Wakeling on guitar, Liam Halliwell on guitar and saxophone, Jordan Thompson on keyboard, and Mark Rogers on bass. All six members shared vocal duties across studio performances and live recordings. The band was renowned for its prolific recording output, having released eight full-length studio albums over seven years, and its heavy touring schedule that frequently took in regional towns alongside more traditional capital city venues.

After a decade of existence, The Ocean Party announced in February 2019 that it would be disbanding at the conclusion of a farewell tour. The decision was motivated by the shock passing of guitarist, drummer and vocalist Zac Denton, who died of a brain cyst in October 2018, with the band saying that "we felt that writing new material without him wouldn’t feel right".

== History ==
=== Formation and Shakin' Like a Leaf EP (2009–2010) ===
The origins of the band began in Wagga Wagga, where initial members Lachlan Denton, Curtis Wakeling, Liam Halliwell and Ben Protasiewicz met while in high school. Each member played in "a lot of youth bands", on account of Wagga's burgeoning live music scene and an injection of government funding that spawned the creation of a host of local outfits, whom would play regular shows. The quartet moved to Melbourne in 2009 and formed The Ocean Party, with an initial lineup of Denton on vocals and guitar, Wakeling on guitar, Halliwell on bass and Protasiewicz on drums. The band's name was inspired by a themed party held for Wakeling's 21st birthday.

Still in its nascent stages, the band would record a handful of tracks for its upcoming debut extended play, uploading "Winter", "Shaking Like a Leaf", and "St Kilda Beach" to the Triple J Unearthed website. The former would receive its first spin on national radio on 5 November 2009, appearing on Steph Hughes' Home and Hosed program on Triple J. Those three songs, alongside "Clouds" and "I Don't Know If I Should Go" formed the band's self-titled debut EP, launched at The Tote Hotel in Collingwood, Victoria on 14 November 2009. Protasiewicz would depart the band soon after the release, replaced on drums by Simon Lam and joined by pianist Jordan Thompson in early 2010. The band's work continued to catch the attention of Triple J, with "Shaking Like a Leaf" receiving airplay on music director Richard Kingsmill's weekly show in February 2010. Continuing to write and tour, The Ocean Party released "Young Love" on SoundCloud in November 2010, promoted as a track from a second EP of demos to be released late that year. The demo was made in 2010 in the house of gore and was handwritten in a paper sleeve with the tracks My Shoes, Sunday Afternoon, To Dumb to Leave, Young Love, Every House in my Street and You'll get Yours soon. The demo cover had a picture of a blue cigarette lighter and it was titled - The Ocean Party Demos.

=== The Sun Rolled Off the Hills (2011–12) ===
The now five-piece would turn its attention to crafting its debut album in the new year. Australian music stalwart Dave Graney championed the band after seeing them play the support slot at a Ron Peno gig, describing them as "quite post punk in the ringing guitars and vocals" and likening the band to early Orange Juice. The worked from their home in Northcote to record the album, which would be composed of songs written from the band's inception right up until the present day, with completion of the recording process occurring in September 2011. Lead single and album opener "The Dogs" was self-released through Bandcamp by the band on 1 October 2011, backed by B-side "Luscious Lips". Music journalist Zahra Khamissa wrote for Tone Deaf that "The Dogs", a guitar-based track just short of two minutes in length, was "a light-hearted tune, one that should be accompanied with roof top beers and a hazy sunset." Six weeks later, second single "Deadbeat" received a digital and physical release on 15 November 2011, with "Young Love" being re-released as the album's third single on 20 December 2011.

The Ocean Party's debut album, The Sun Rolled Off the Hills, was released on vinyl LP, CD and digitally on 31 January 2012 through Sound of Melbourne Records. The band wrote collaboratively to craft the album's ten tracks, which clock in at 27 minutes total. Unlike the band's later work, The Sun Rolled Off the Hills almost exclusively features guitars, piano and drums, with little to no extra instruments or studio flourishes. The immediacy and brevity of the record led one reviewer to bestow the band with having a "get-in, get-out attitude". "Shakin' Like a Leaf", the only song from the band's debut EP to be reprised on the album, drew comparisons to The Shins, while album closer "Every House" was described as sounding "like The Go-Betweens doing 'Born to Run'-lite".

Thematically, the record's lyrics talk of blossoming relationships, leaving home, and adolescence. It also references locations such as Shepparton and Northcote railway station. Opening pairing "The Dogs" and "The Farm" centre around vast landscapes and persistent sunshine, the latter theme recurring on final track "Every House"; "Shakin' Like a Leaf" explores the nervousness around losing one's virginity; and "Still Raining" and "Shepparton" follow the challenges of a long-distance relationship. Single "Deadbeat" presents a dichotomy between a homeless beggar and a burgeoning arts student, raising issues around respect and upbringing. The album's remaining songs all fall under the banner of young love.

The band toured the record with a four-date album launch beginning in their hometown of Wagga Wagga on 17 February 2012, and stopping in Sydney, Adelaide and Melbourne.

=== The Oddfellows' Hall and death of Zac Denton (2018) ===
Zac Denton suddenly died due to a brain cyst that caused swelling in October 2018. In honor of his life, the band released their final album, The Oddfellows' Hall early.

== Band members ==
Lachlan Denton

Zac Denton

Liam Halliwell

Nick Kearton

Simon Lam

Ben Protasiewicz

Mark Rogers

Jordan Thompson

Curtis Wakeling

== Discography ==
=== Studio albums ===
Title	Album details
The Sun Rolled Off the Hills	Released: 31 January 2012; Label: Sound of Melbourne; Format: CD, LP, download
Social Clubs	Released: 14 October 2012; Label: Sound of Melbourne / Birds Love Fighting; Format: CD, LP, download
Split	Released: 7 October 2013; Label: Spunk; Format: CD, LP, download
Soft Focus	Released: 31 October 2014; Label: Spunk / Jigsaw; Format: CD, LP, download
Light Weight	Released: 9 October 2015; Label: Spunk / Caroline / Austin Town Hall; Format: CD, LP, download
Restless	Released: 23 September 2016; Label: Spunk / Aloe Music / Melodic; Format: CD, LP, download
Beauty Point	Released: 18 August 2017; Label: Spunk / Emotional Response; Format: CD, LP, download
The Oddfellows' Hall	Released: 31 October 2018; Label: Spunk / Emotional Response; Format: CD, LP, download

=== Compilation albums ===
Title	Album details
Mess & Noise Critics Poll 2015	Released: 27 January 2016; Label: self-released; Format: cassette, download
B-Grade Material	Released: 15 January 2017; Label: self-released; Format: cassette, download

=== Mini albums ===
Title	Album details
I.B.O.	Released: 3 August 2018; Label: Spunk; Format: 7-inch, download

=== Extended plays ===
Title	EP details
The Ocean Party	Released: 14 November 2009; Label: self-released; Format: CD, download
Demos	Released: c. November 2010; Label: self-released; Format: CD, download
In a Knot	Released: 25 June 2012; Label: self-released; Format: CD, download
Split	Released: 2 September 2013; Label: self-released; Format: cassette, download
USA Tour EP	Released: 21 February 2017; Label: Emotional Response; Format: cassette, download
Guilt	Released: 1 December 2017; Label: Spunk; Format: cassette, download
Nothing Grows	Released: 15 March 2019; Label: Spunk / Emotional Response; Format: 12-inch, download

=== Singles ===
Title	Year	Album
"The Dogs"	2011	The Sun Rolled Off the Hills
"Deadbeat"	2011	The Sun Rolled Off the Hills
"Young Love"	2011	The Sun Rolled Off the Hills
"On the Floor"	2012	Social Clubs
"In a Knot"	2012	Social Clubs
"Split"	2013	Split
"Quarter Life Crisis"	2013	Split
"Wading In"	2014	Soft Focus
"Head Down"	2014	Soft Focus
"Deluded"	2015	Soft Focus
"Floodlights"	2015	Soft Focus
"Guess Work"	2015	Light Weight
"Greedy"	2015	Light Weight
"Black Blood"	2015	Light Weight
"Back Bar"	2016	Restless
"Restless"	2016	Restless
"Quality Control"	2017	Beauty Point
"More to Run"	2017	Beauty Point
"Tell"	2017	Guilt
"Promotional Single"	2018	I.B.O.
"Off and On"	2018	The Oddfellows' Hall
"What It's Worth"	2018	The Oddfellows' Hall
"Nothing Grows"	2019	Nothing Grows

=== Music videos ===
Song	Year	Director
"Deadbeat"	2011	The Ocean Party
"Social Clubs"	2012	The Ocean Party
"In a Knot"	2012	Matthew Cribb
"Split"	2013	Matthew Cribb
"Quarter Life Crisis"	2013	Matthew Cribb
"Wading In"	2014	Thomas Mendelovits
"Head Down"	2014	The Ocean Party
"Deluded"	2015	Alex Badham
"Floodlights"	2015	Alex Badham
"Norman Street"	2015	The Ocean Party
"Guess Work"	2015	Katrina and Troy
"Greedy"	2015	Rex Kane-Hart
"Black Blood"	2015	Matthew Cribb and The Ocean Party
"Light Weight"	2016	The Ocean Party
"Back Bar"	2016	Bree Carter and Matthew Cribb
"Restless"	2016	Declan Baker
"Decent Living"	2017	The Ocean Party
"Quality Control"	2017	The Ocean Party
"More to Run"	2017	Zachary Bradtke
"Memorial Flame Trees"	2017	The Ocean Party
"Cracked and Shattering"	2017	The Ocean Party
"Off and On"	2018	The Ocean Party
"What It's Worth"	2018	The Ocean Party
"Rain On Tin"	2019	The Ocean Party
