= Martial Arts Weekend =

Studio album by The Extra Glenns
- Released: 2002
- Genre: Indie rock, folk
- Label: Absolutely Kosher

The Extra Glenns chronology
Martial Arts Weekend (2002)	Undercard (2010)

Professional ratings
Review scores
Source	Rating
AllMusic	4.5/5 stars
Pitchfork Media	(6.7/10)

Martial Arts Weekend is an album by indie-rock band The Extra Glenns, a band made up of John Darnielle and Franklin Bruno. The album was released in 2002.

== Critical reception ==
Pitchfork wrote that "after the initial novelty of hearing more than your average instrumentation beneath Darnielle's literate whine, Martial Arts Weekend comes off as a semi-pleasing but second-tier Mountain Goats effort."

== Track listing ==
1. "Baltimore" - 2:45
2. "All Rooms Cable A/C Free Coffee" - 1:48
3. "Ultra Violet" - 2:47
4. "Twelve Hands High" - 2:47
5. "The River Song" - 3:25
6. "Somebody Else's Parking Lot in Sebastopol" - 2:17
7. "Memories" (Leonard Cohen cover) - 4:00
8. "Going to Morocco" - 2:10
9. "Going to Michigan" - 2:29
10. "Terminal Grain" - 1:58
11. "Malevolent Seascape Y" - 3:43
12. "Going to Marrakesh" - 2:47
