= The Mountain Goats =

American indie folk band

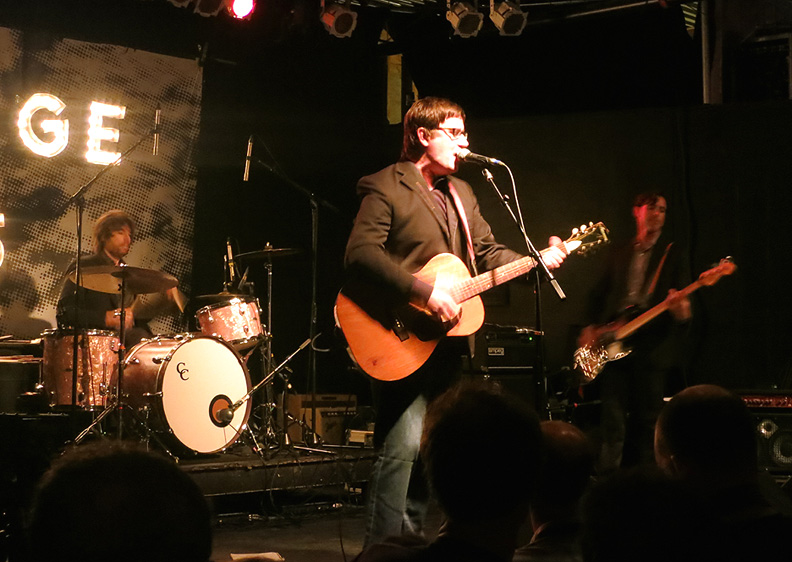
- The Mountain Goats in 2014

Background information
- Origin: Claremont, California, United States
- Genres: Indie folk; indie rock; folk rock; lo-fi
- Years active: 1991–present
- Labels: Cadmean Dawn; Merge; 4AD; Absolutely Kosher; 3 Beads of Sweat Records; Yoyo Records
- Members: John Darnielle; Jon Wurster; Matt Douglas
- Past members: Peter Hughes; Rachel Ware

The Mountain Goats are an American indie folk band formed in Claremont, California, by singer-songwriter John Darnielle. Since 2003, the band has been based in Durham, North Carolina. For many years, the sole member of the Mountain Goats was Darnielle, despite the plural moniker. Although he remains the core member of the band, he has worked with a variety of collaborators over time, including bassist and vocalist Peter Hughes, drummer Jon Wurster, multi-instrumentalist Matt Douglas, singer-songwriter Franklin Bruno, bassist and vocalist Rachel Ware, singer-songwriter/producer John Vanderslice, guitarist Kaki King, and multi-instrumentalist Annie Clark.

Throughout the 1990s, the Mountain Goats were known for producing low-fidelity home recordings (most notably, on a cassette deck boombox) and releasing recordings in cassette or vinyl 7-inch formats. Since 2002, the Mountain Goats have adopted a more polished approach, often recording studio albums with a full band.

== History ==
=== 1991–1995: Early years ===
The band's name is a reference to the Screamin' Jay Hawkins song "Yellow Coat". Darnielle released his first recording as the Mountain Goats (Taboo VI: The Homecoming, on Shrimper Records) in 1991. Many of his first recordings and performances featured Darnielle accompanied by members of the all-girl reggae band the Casual Girls, who became known as the Bright Mountain Choir. One of this group's members, Rachel Ware, continued to accompany Darnielle on bass, both live until 1995 and studio til 1996.

The first five years of the Mountain Goats' career saw a prolific output of songs on cassette, vinyl and CD. These releases spanned multiple labels and countries of origin, often released in limited numbers. The focus of the Mountain Goats project was the urgency of writing. Songs not recorded adequately to tape within days of being written were often forgotten. Cassette releases during this time include The Hound Chronicles, Transmissions to Horace, Hot Garden Stomp, Taking the Dative, and Yam, the King of Crops.

In 1994, the Mountain Goats released their first full-length studio album, Zopilote Machine, on Ajax Records. It is the band's only full album featuring the entirety of the Bright Mountain Choir.

=== 1995–2000: Sweden, Nothing for Juice, Full Force Galesburg, and The Coroner's Gambit ===
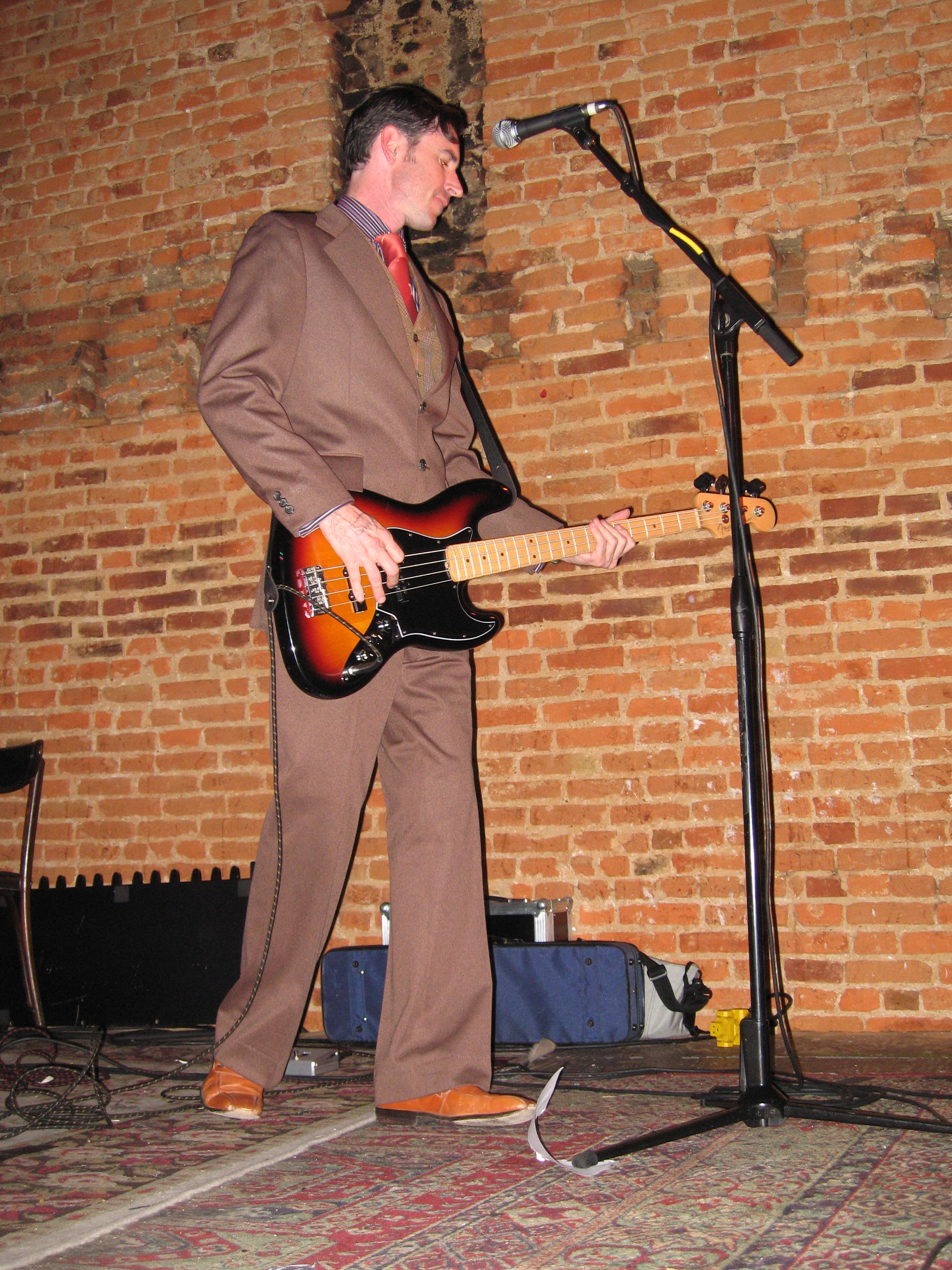
Peter Hughes in 2007

By 1995, most of what could be considered classic Mountain Goats conventions (boom-box recording, song series, Latin quotes, and mythological themes) were abandoned in favor of a more thematically focused and experimental sound. This period was marked by Darnielle's collaborations with other artists including Alastair Galbraith and Simon Joyner. In November 1996, Darnielle announced a vow to "clear his musical tendency for profanity" to promote a more optimistic reception to the ideas outlined in his material.

In 1995, the album Sweden was released. Soon after its recording, a sequel titled Hail and Farewell, Gothenburg was recorded, but never released. It remained unheard by the general public until 2007, when it was leaked against Darnielle's wishes. In 1996, the Mountain Goats released the album Nothing for Juice, and Full Force Galesburg the following year. Rachel Ware left the band in 1996 after the recording of Nothing for Juice, and bassist Peter Hughes then played bass for the band on some tours, and Hughes later officially joined the band in 2002.

Between 1998 and 2000, the Mountain Goats slowed down their prolific output, releasing The Coroner's Gambit in October 2000. The album partially returned to the band's roots, as most songs were sporadically recorded on Darnielle's old Panasonic RX-FT500 cassette deck Boombox, which produced a loud background noise to the songs.

=== 2001–2003: All Hail West Texas and Tallahassee ===
2002 saw the release of two Mountain Goats albums: All Hail West Texas and Tallahassee. These albums mark a distinct change in focus for the Mountain Goats project, being the first in a series of concept albums that explore aspects of The Mountain Goats' canon in depth. All Hail West Texas featured the resurrection of Darnielle's early boom box recording for a complete album. Darnielle considers this album to be the culmination of his lo-fi recording style. Tallahassee, the first Mountain Goats album to be recorded with a full band and in a studio, explores and concludes the relationship of a couple whose lives were the subject of the song cycle known as the Alpha Series. It was the first album to be released on a major label, 4AD, marking the start of the 4AD years of the band.

Also released that year was Martial Arts Weekend, attributed to The Extra Glenns, a collaboration with Franklin Bruno on several previously unreleased Mountain Goats songs. Following that recording, Bruno joined Darnielle in the studio along with bassist Peter Hughes, who was the second official member of the band and accompanied Darnielle on tour. These three musicians formed what was considered the Mountain Goats studio band.

=== 2004–2009: 4AD years ===
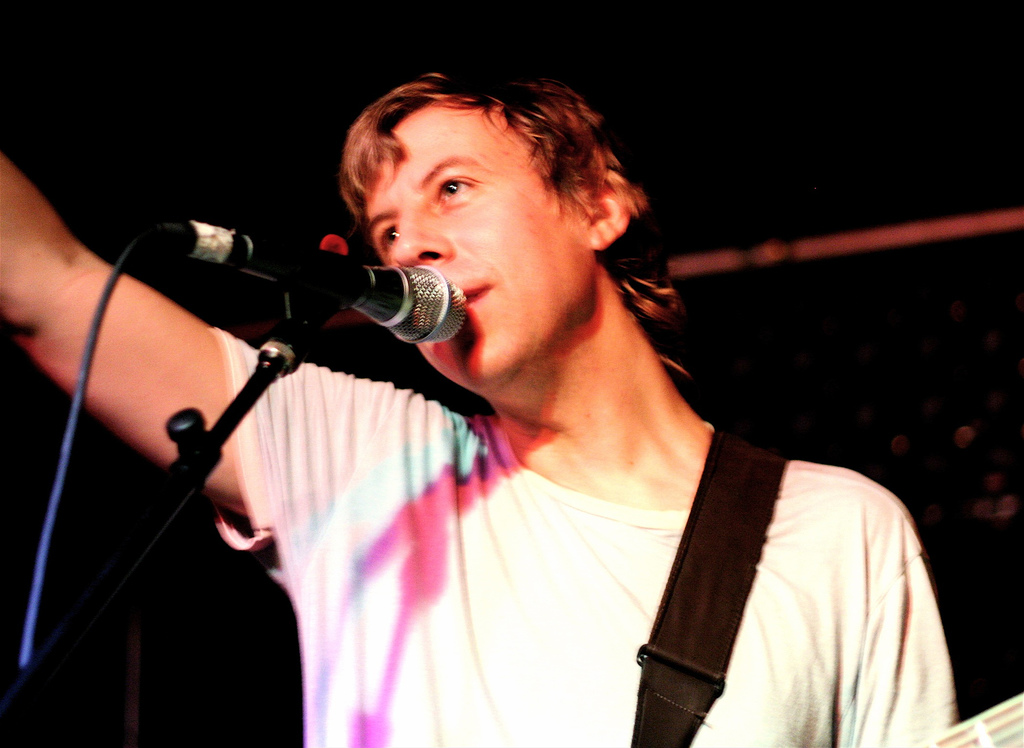
Record producer John Vanderslice in 2006

In 2004, the Mountain Goats released We Shall All Be Healed. The album marked a number of changes for the Mountain Goats, as it was the first time Darnielle worked with producer John Vanderslice, and the first album of directly autobiographical material. We Shall All Be Healed chronicles Darnielle's life with a group of friends and acquaintances addicted to methamphetamine in Portland, Oregon, though the album is set in Pomona, California. The following year, the band's second Vanderslice-produced album, The Sunset Tree, was released. Again autobiographical, Darnielle tackled the subject of his early childhood spent with an abusive stepfather. Darnielle had previously dealt with this subject in what he often refers to as the only "extensively autobiographical" song he had written before 2004, the 1999 unreleased song "You're in Maya". The Mountain Goats relocated to Durham, North Carolina, in 2006, and issued Get Lonely, which was produced by Scott Solter, who had worked with Vanderslice on engineering for prior Mountain Goats records.

Jon Wurster joined the group in 2007, playing drums on the last leg of the Get Lonely tour. The band recorded tracks for its next album at Prairie Sun studios. Entitled Heretic Pride, the album was released on 19 February 2008. Produced by John Vanderslice and Scott Solter, the album saw Darnielle, Hughes, and Wurster joined by Franklin Bruno, Erik Friedlander, Annie Clark (better known by her stage name, St. Vincent), and members of The Bright Mountain Choir. American alternative hip hop artist Aesop Rock released a remix of the track "Lovecraft in Brooklyn" from the album, and in return Darnielle contributed vocals to his album None Shall Pass, in the song "Coffee". In addition, the Mountain Goats released two other EPs in 2008, a collaboration with Kaki King entitled Black Pear Tree and the four-song Satanic Messiah EP.

In 2009, Darnielle and Vanderslice collaborated on the record Moon Colony Bloodbath. Released in a limited vinyl run of 1000 and sold during their "Gone Primitive" tour, the EP was a concept record about organ harvesting colonies on the Moon. This was followed by the next full Mountain Goats album, The Life of the World to Come, which released in October of the same year. The album is composed of twelve tracks, each one inspired by (and titled after) a single verse of the Christian Bible. In publicizing the record, the band made their first ever television appearance, performing "Psalms 40:2" on The Colbert Report, hosted by professed Mountain Goats fan Stephen Colbert.

=== 2010–2024: Merge Records years ===
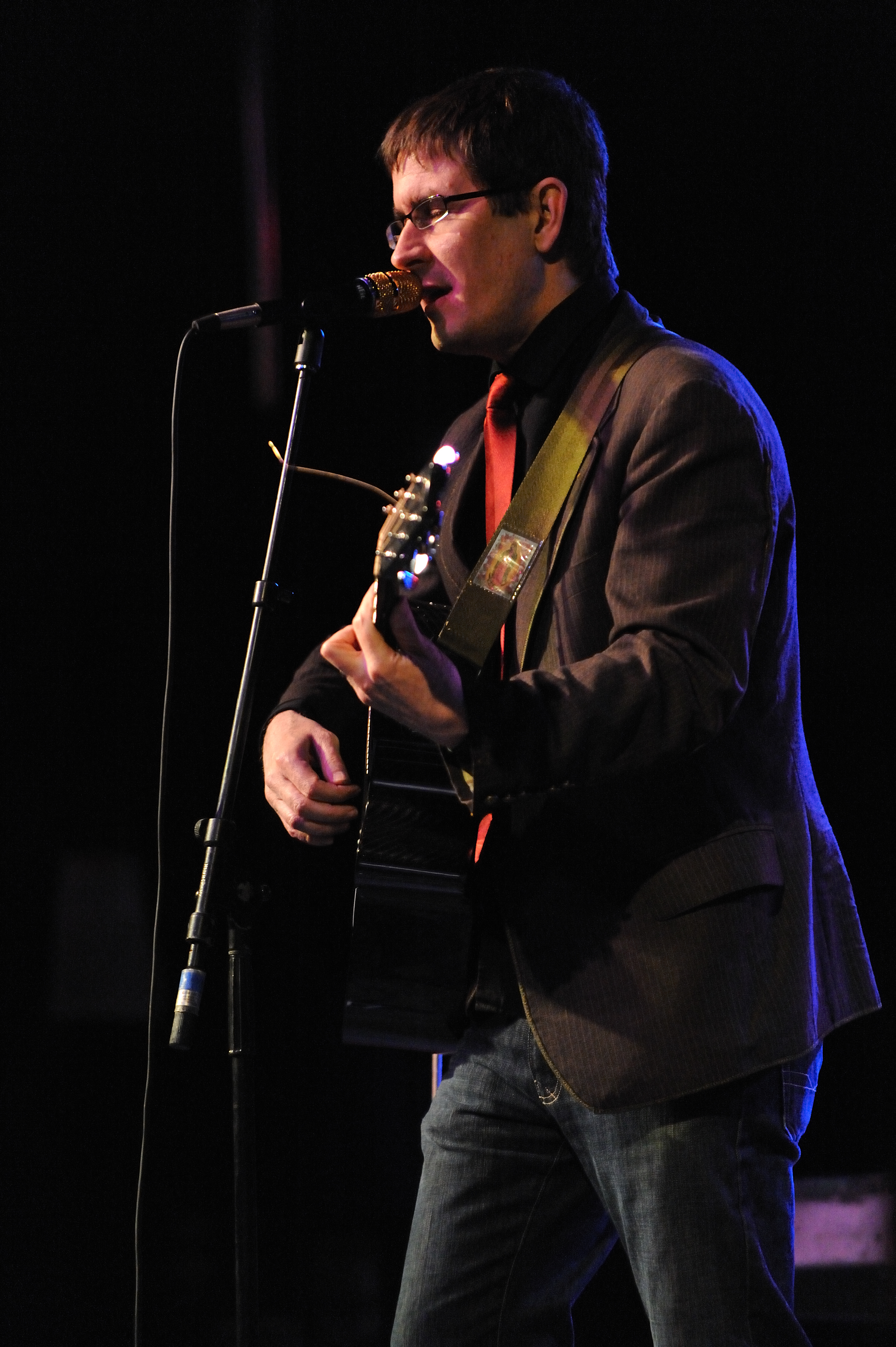
John Darnielle playing a solo show under the name The Mountain Goats at Harvest of Hope Festival in St. Augustine, Florida, in 2010

The Mountain Goats signed to Merge Records, home to drummer Jon Wurster's other band, Superchunk, in 2010. The label issued a new record by The Extra Lens, formerly The Extra Glenns, entitled Undercard, followed by another Mountain Goats LP, All Eternals Deck, in 2011. They were also chosen by Jeff Mangum of Neutral Milk Hotel to perform at the All Tomorrow's Parties festival that he was due to curate in December 2011 in Minehead, England, but were unable to appear due to a rescheduling.

The band's fourteenth studio album, Transcendental Youth, was released in late 2012, and in early 2013 they played at Carnegie Hall in support of John Green and Hank Green in their "Evening of Awesome" performance. In July 2013, All Hail West Texas was re-released on vinyl. During an interview with Stereogum in August 2012, John Darnielle said that Amy Grant was his favorite pop artist, and noted that "Rich Mullins is one of the best songwriters I know of." Mullins was the songwriter who penned many of Grant's hits.

The Mountain Goats released their 15th album, Beat the Champ, on 7 April 2015, again with Merge Records. According to Pitchfork Media, the album concentrates on the professional wrestlers Darnielle admired when he was a child and tries to develop and imagine their lives. Multi-instrumentalist Matt Douglas assisted the group in recording the album, and soon thereafter became a full-time member.

In January 2017, the Mountain Goats recorded a humorous song per request of director Rian Johnson, depicting an alternate story of his upcoming movie, Star Wars: The Last Jedi. The song, titled "The Ultimate Jedi Who Wastes All the Other Jedi and Eats Their Bones", was published on Johnson's SoundCloud page.

In May 2017, they released their sixteenth studio album, Goths. The band has stated that Goths was inspired by an adolescence listening to The Cure, Bauhaus, Siouxsie and the Banshees, and Joy Division, as well as hearing songs on the Californian radio station KROQ-FM.

In January 2019, the band announced the April 26 release of their Dungeons & Dragons–inspired album, In League with Dragons (and released initial single, "Younger"), via Merge Records. The announcement was accompanied by a live music stream from the Wizards of the Coast headquarters.

In March 2020, while the COVID-19 pandemic left the band unable to tour, Darnielle retrieved his old Panasonic RX-FT500 tape deck and recorded 10 new songs, using the direct-to-boombox method for the first time since 2002's All Hail West Texas. The resulting album, entitled Songs for Pierre Chuvin, was inspired by Darnielle's reading of Pierre Chuvin's 1990 book A Chronicle of the Last Pagans, and was released digitally on April 10, 2020, with a limited physical release on cassette through Merge Records.

The Mountain Goats announced in August 2020 that the band's nineteenth studio album, Getting Into Knives, would be released on October 23, 2020, on CD, vinyl, cassette, and digital.

In April 2021, the Mountain Goats announced their album Dark in Here, released on June 25, alongside the release of its first single "Mobile". The album was recorded at FAME Studios. The band's 21st album, Bleed Out, was released on August 19, 2022.

In July 2023, the band announced their 22nd album Jenny from Thebes, a "rock opera about a woman named Jenny", would be released on October 27, 2023. The character "Jenny" has appeared in several previous songs by the band, notably in several from All Hail West Texas.

Peter Hughes announced his departure from the band in August 2024, citing "health and sanity" concerns among other reasons.

=== 2025–present: Independent years ===
John Darnielle, The Mountain Goats, Columbus, Ohio 2026

In September 2025, Darnielle announced a new album, Through This Fire Across from Peter Balkan, to be released on the Mountain Goats' own independent label, Cadmean Dawn, after fifteen years with Merge Records. The album was released on November 7, 2025. Darnielle explained that Through This Fire Across from Peter Balkan was originally inspired by a dream Darnielle had. He wrote, "I transcribed what I could remember of it into the note-taking app I keep on my phone. The note reads: 'through this fire across from peter balkan #dream. It was the title of a work, not sure which form.' The next time I sat at the piano to see if I had ideas, I got the notion of writing a work that proceeded from its title, and that tried to make real the dreamlike grammar of that title."

The album Days was released on August 7, 2026, also via Cadmean Dawn.

== Members ==
Douglas and Darnielle at the Princess Theatre in 2026

=== Current members ===
- John Darnielle – vocals, guitar, keyboard (1991–present)
- Jon Wurster – drums (2007–present)
- Matt Douglas – saxophone, flute, clarinet, guitar, bass, keyboard, backing vocals (2015–present)

=== Current touring members ===
- Cameron Ralston – bass (2025–present)

=== Former members and collaborators ===
- Peter Hughes – bass, backing vocals (1996, 2002–2024)
- Rachel Ware – bass, vocals (1992–1995), (session musician 1995–1996)
- The Bright Mountain Choir (Rachel Ware, Amy Piatt, Sarah Arslanian, Rosanne Lindley)
- The North Mass Mountain Choir
- Franklin Bruno – piano
- Lalitree Darnielle – banjo
- Alastair Galbraith – violin
- Graeme Jefferies – guitar
- John Vanderslice
- Erik Friedlander – cello
- Owen Pallett – strings
- Scott Solter
- Alex Decarville
- Richard Colburn – drums
- Christopher McGuire – drums
- Nora Danielson – violin
- Maggie Doyle – keytar
- Kaki King
- Yuval Semo – organ, piano, string arrangement
- Isa Burke – guitar, violin (touring member 2023–2024)
- Alicia Bognanno – guitar, keyboard, backing vocals

== Discography ==
Studio albums

- Zopilote Machine (1994)
- Sweden (1995)
- Nothing for Juice (1996)
- Full Force Galesburg (1997)
- The Coroner's Gambit (2000)
- All Hail West Texas (2002)
- Tallahassee (2002)
- We Shall All Be Healed (2004)
- The Sunset Tree (2005)
- Get Lonely (2006)
- Heretic Pride (2008)
- The Life of the World to Come (2009)
- All Eternals Deck (2011)
- Transcendental Youth (2012)
- Beat the Champ (2015)
- Goths (2017)
- In League with Dragons (2019)
- Songs for Pierre Chuvin (2020)
- Getting Into Knives (2020)
- Dark in Here (2021)
- Bleed Out (2022)
- Jenny from Thebes (2023)
- Through This Fire Across from Peter Balkan (2025)
- Days (2026)

== In other media ==
In the Showtime television series Weeds, the band performed the Theme to Weeds (Malvina Reynolds' "Little Boxes") during the opening credits of Season 8, Episode 5. The Adult Swim show Moral Orel featured "Love, Love, Love", "Old College Try", and "No Children" on several episodes of Season 3.

The band made their television debut on October 6, 2009, playing "Psalms 40:2" on The Colbert Report. On January 19, 2010, they played "Genesis 3:23" on Late Night with Jimmy Fallon. On February 23, 2011, they played "Birth of Serpents" in support of their album, All Eternals Deck, on the Late Show with David Letterman. On April 6, 2015, the band performed "Foreign Object" on Late Night with Seth Meyers while promoting Beat the Champ. In July 2019, the band performed on The Late Show with Stephen Colbert, with Stephen Colbert joining in to sing "This Year".
