= Franklin Bruno =

American singer-songwriter, academic and writer

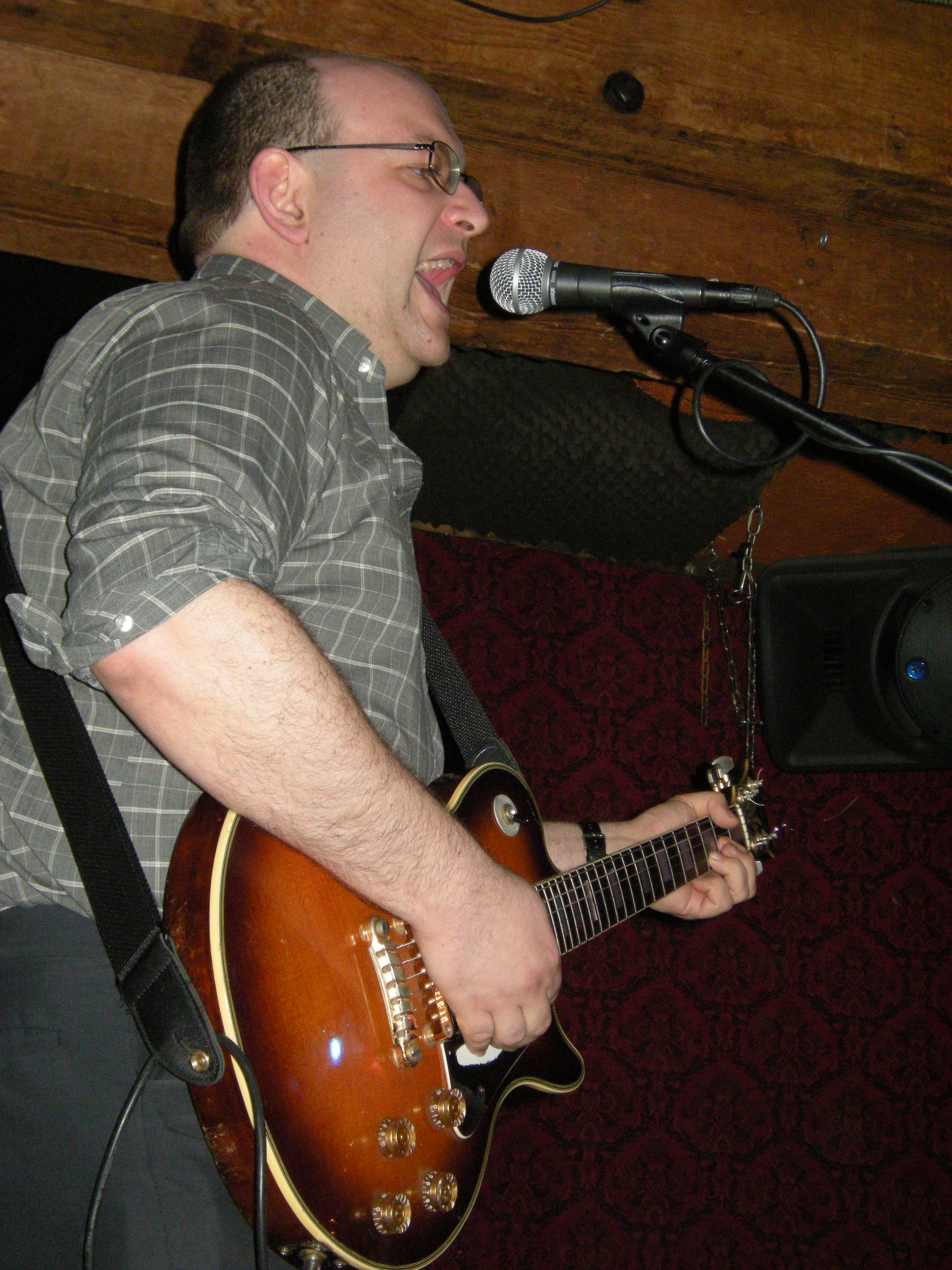
Franklin Bruno (2009).

Franklin Bruno (born December 29, 1968) is an American singer-songwriter, academic and writer originally from Upland, California. He has been a member of Nothing Painted Blue since 1986.

== Career ==
Bruno has written music criticism for online and print publications such as The Village Voice. In 2004, he received a doctorate in philosophy from UCLA. As of 2020, he is a lecturer at SUNY Purchase. Previously was a faculty member at Pomona College, Northwestern University, and Bard College.

In addition to his own recordings, Bruno worked on The Mountain Goats albums Tallahassee and The Sunset Tree. He also records with The Mountain Goats frontman John Darnielle as The Extra Lens. Jenny Toomey and Calexico released Tempting, a collection of Bruno's songs, on Misra Records in December 2002.

Civics, the first album by Bruno's new band, The Human Hearts, was released by Tight Ship Records in 2007.

== Discography ==
=== Albums ===
- Suggestion Box (Shrimper, 1991) [cassette-only]
- Etudes for Voice and Snackmaster (Shrimper, 1993) [cassette-only]
- A Bedroom Community (Simple Machines, 1995)
- Kiss Without Makeup (Absolutely Kosher, 2000)
- A Cat May Look at a Queen (Absolutely Kosher, 2002)
- Martial Arts Weekend (recorded with John Darnielle, as The Extra Glenns) (Absolutely Kosher, 2002)
- Civics (Tight Ship Records, 2007) (as The Human Hearts)
- Local Currency (Fayettenam Records, May 2009)
- Undercard Recorded with John Darnielle as The Extra Lens (Merge Records, November 2010)
- Another (Shrimper Records, 2012) (as The Human Hearts)

=== EPs ===
- Hermetic Geometry (Baby Huey, 1992) [7-inch]
- The Irony Engine (Walt Records, 1993) [7-inch]
- A Sand Dollar Relief Map (Shrimper, 1995) [7-inch]
- La Radia (Little Teddy, 1997) [Germany] [7-inch]
- Participant (Dark Beloved Cloud, 1997) [lathe-pressed 7-inch]
- Set of Pipes (Dark Beloved Cloud, 2003) [3-inch CD]

== Bibliography ==
- Elvis Costello's Armed Forces (Continuum Books' 33⅓ series, 2005)
