= Nothing Painted Blue =

American indie rock band

Nothing Painted Blue was an American indie rock band led by songwriter Franklin Bruno since the 1990s. Bruno and drummer Kyle Brodie have been the only constant members as the remainder of the line-up has undergone a number of changes throughout the band's existence. Peter Hughes was another early member of the band. They formed in 1987 in Los Angeles and released their debut LP, A Baby, A Blanket, A Packet of Seeds, in 1990. Bruno and Brodie were previously in the band Born Leaders.

The band sometimes spelled their name as "N∅thing Painted Blue" (abbreviated "∅PB"), a use of notation for the empty set in mathematics. References to mathematics are common in their songwriting and iconography (Bruno's undergraduate degree was in mathematics); for example, their 1998 record was named after the Monte Carlo method.

== Discography ==
=== Albums ===
- A Baby A Blanket A Packet Of Seeds (Jupa, 1990)

[As yet never released on CD, it remains an obscure LP-only release.]

- Logorrhea (Shrimper, 1992)

[Cassette-only release of tracks taken from four early college radio broadcast performances.]

- Power Trips Down Lovers Lane (KokoPop, 1993)
- Placeholders (Scat, 1994)
- Emotional Discipline (Scat, 1997)

[A compilation of several 7-inch single and compilation tracks.]

- The Monte Carlo Method (Scat, 1998)

[The LP version included a bonus two-song 7-inch single.]

- Taste The Flavor (Shrimper, 2005)

=== 7" Singles and EPs ===
- The Bellyspeak EP (Jupa, 1991)
- "Swivelchair" b/w "Blooming, Buzzing" (KokoPop, 1992)

[A CD single edition includes a third song, "El Niño".]

- "Few" b/w "Or Do They?" (Scat, 1992)
- "Sorely Tempted" b/w "Lab Rat Blues" and "Going to Fontana" (Jupa, 1993)
- "Another Child Bride", from a Working Holiday series split 7-inch with Lois (Simple Machines, 1993)
- Biographer's Ruse cassette (Car in Car Disco Products, 1994)
- The Future of Communication EP (Scat, 1995)
- "After the Housewarming" b/w "Love to the Third Power" (Anyway, 1994)
- "Anti-Nomination", from a split 7-inch with Refrigerator included with issue No. 8 of Nipple Hardness Factor zine (1995)
- "President Am I" b/w "Contraption" (Pottery, 1995)
- "Control Freak" b/w "Niacin" (Scat, 1996)
- "Growth Spurt (Neelon Mix)" b/w "Centerfold" (Scat, 1998 - included with the LP version of The Monte Carlo Method)

=== Compilation appearances ===
- "Caprice Classic", from the Winky Dog cassette (Shrimper, 1990)
- "A Lesser Charge", from the Capgun cassette (Shrimper, 1991)
- "Go to Waste", from the If I Could Hear You, I Would Hit You 7-inch (Baby Huey, 1991)
- "Big Pink Heart", from the Swing Set 7-inch (Shrimper, 1992)

[This track was also included on the Shrimper compilation Abridged Perversion.]

- "Sugarlift", from the Pawnshop Reverb cassette (Shrimper, 1992)
- "Missed the Point", from A Day in the Park (The Now Sound, 1993)
- "Another Child Bride", from the Working Holiday (July) 7-inch (Simple Machines, 1993), later compiled on Working Holiday! (Simple Machines, 1994)
- "Anti-Nomination" (written by Refrigerator), (1995)

[From a split 7-inch with Refrigerator, included with an issue of Nipple Hardness Factor zine.]

- "Complications", from the Scat Records 1995 Sampler promo-only cassette (Scat, 1995)

[The track was, at the time, intended to be included on Emotional Discipline. It was taken from another of the band's early college radio broadcast performances not featured on Logorrhea.]

- "My Heart and the Real World", a Minutemen cover, from Green Light Go (BottleCap, 1995)
- "Rag Content", from The Basement Tapes vol. 1 LP (KSPC, 1995)
- "Passing Up A Kiss", from Family Album (Shy Boy, 1996)
- "Wiser Heads", from the In Release City cassette (Slowball, 1996)

[This was a full-band version of a song originally recorded by Franklin Bruno solo.]

- "Nightshirt", from Second Semi-Annual Report (Scat, 1997)

[A "rough", but ultimately not drastically different, mix of "Shameproof Flirt" from The Monte Carlo Method.]

- "Wipe Your Hands", from the I've Got It Now cassette (Shelflife, 1997)

[This was credited to 'Coco Pelli' and played by Franklin Bruno and Kyle Brodie without a bassist.]

- "Who's Landing In My Hangar?", a The Human Switchboard cover, from We Can Still Be Friends (Magic Marker, 1998)
- "Miracle Thaw", from Object Lessons: Songs About Products (Inconspicuous Records, a product of Beer Frame Magazine, 1998)
