= All Hail West Texas =

Studio album by the Mountain Goats
- Released: February 19, 2002
- Recorded: 2001
- Genre: Lo-fi
- Length: 43:07
- Label: Emperor Jones
- Producer: John Darnielle

The Mountain Goats chronology
The Coroner's Gambit (2000)	All Hail West Texas (2002)	Tallahassee (2002)

Professional ratings
Aggregate scores
Source	Rating
Metacritic	87/100
Review scores
Source	Rating
AllMusic	4/5 stars
The Line of Best Fit	(9.5/10)
Pitchfork	(8.2/10) (Initial release) (9.0/10) (Reissue)
Popmatters	favorable
Tiny Mix Tapes	4/5 stars
Tom Hull	B+

All Hail West Texas is the sixth studio album by the Mountain Goats. After the slight increase in production values on The Coroner's Gambit album of 2000, All Hail West Texas was the last Mountain Goats album recorded entirely on John Darnielle's trademark Panasonic RX-FT500 boombox until 2020's Songs for Pierre Chuvin. Similarly, it marked the end of an era for the band, as it was the last album by the Mountain Goats to feature only John Darnielle until 2020. The cover advertises that the album consists of "fourteen songs about seven people, two houses, a motorcycle, and a locked treatment facility for adolescent boys."

Several songs were written to appear on the record that were not included in its final version. Three were given away on the Tiny Mix Tapes website ("Song for God," "Warm Lonely Planet," and "Waco"). Darnielle said there was a full set of fifteen outtakes that he intended to release for free one day, but he destroyed them after hearing about the leak of Hail and Farewell, Gothenburg. It is not known whether that set included the three listed above.

In May 2013, Darnielle announced that Merge Records would reissue All Hail West Texas on July 23 of that year, on vinyl for the first time. The announcement included a link to an explanatory essay by Matt Fraction. The reissue includes remastered versions of the original recordings, seven previously unreleased tracks contemporary to the original album, and a new 1,800-word essay by Darnielle about the album and his writing process.

== Reception ==
All Hail West Texas was well received by critics compared to other albums created by the Mountain Goats. Critics point out the use of the Panasonic RX-FT500 and how the album had a more raw sound than a studio recording. It is also mentioned that the "wheel grind" of the tape recorder itself is heard throughout the album. Some of the album's critics hold that the general direction of the album is hard to follow. The 2013 reissue was given the title of "Best New Reissue" by Pitchfork.

== Podcast ==
This album has been the focus of the first season of the I Only Listen to the Mountain Goats podcast hosted by John Darnielle and Welcome to Night Vale writer Joseph Fink. Each episode also features an original cover version of a song, which was released as a compilation available for purchase on Merge's website under the title I Only Listen To The Mountain Goats: All Hail West Texas.

== Track listing ==
All lyrics and music by John Darnielle.

No.	Title	Length
1.	"The Best Ever Death Metal Band in Denton"	2:37
2.	"Fall of the Star High School Running Back"	1:49
3.	"Color in Your Cheeks"	2:40
4.	"Jenny"	2:51
5.	"Fault Lines"	2:38
6.	"Balance"	2:03
7.	"Pink and Blue"	2:29
8.	"Riches and Wonders"	3:57
9.	"The Mess Inside"	3:35
10.	"Jeff Davis County Blues"	3:14
11.	"Distant Stations"	3:04
12.	"Blues in Dallas"	4:15
13.	"Source Decay"	3:47
14.	"Absolute Lithops Effect"	4:08
Total length:		43:07

=== 2013 reissue bonus tracks ===
No.	Title	Length
15.	"Hardpan Song"	2:00
16.	"Answering the Phone"	2:29
17.	"Indonesia"	2:29
18.	"Midland"	3:16
19.	"Jenny (alt. take)"	2:52
20.	"Tape Travel Is Lonely"	2:36
21.	"Waco"	3:07
Total length:		62:02
