= Peter Hughes (musician) =

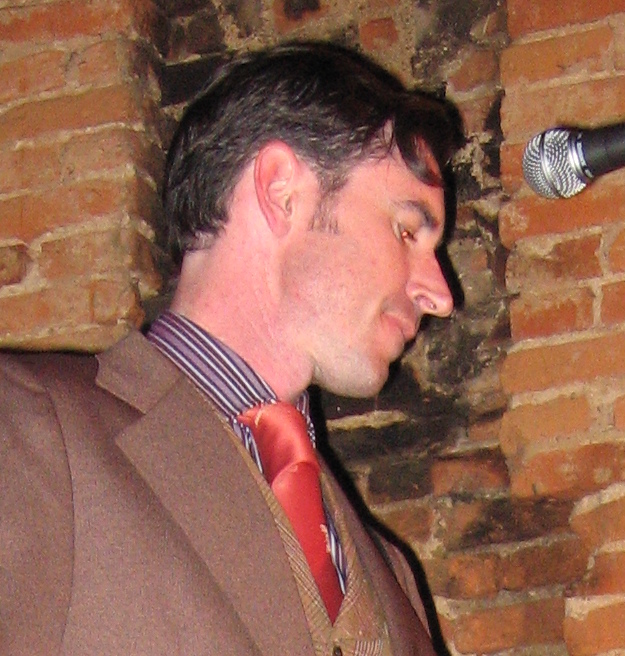
- Hughes in 2007

Background information
- Born: Peter Hughes
- Genres: Indie folk; indie rock; folk rock; lo-fi
- Instruments: Bass, guitar
- Years active: 1986–present

Peter Hughes, also known by his stage name Peter Peter Hughes, is an American multi-instrumentalist best known for his work as the bassist for the Mountain Goats. Prior to formally joining the band, he sang backup vocals on the song "Cubs in Five" from the 1995 EP Nine Black Poppies and performed on some songs on the Mountain Goats album Full Force Galesburg in 1997. Hughes also played bass on two Mountain Goats tours in Europe in 1996. His tenure as full-time bassist with the Mountain Goats began with 2002's Tallahassee, and he performed on every subsequent studio album and touring lineup until 2023’s Jenny from Thebes. In August of 2024, Hughes announced his retirement from the Mountain Goats after 28 years, ending his tenure in both studio and touring capacity with the band.

Prior to his time with the Mountain Goats, Hughes played in a local band in his hometown of Chino, California called Exit House, and fronted a band called DiskothiQ from 1992 to 1999. During this time, Peter also played on recordings with Claremont, CA bands like Nothing Painted Blue, Refrigerator, and Wckr Spgt. Hughes also ran a tape label called Sonic Enemy, best known for releasing the Beck album Golden Feelings on cassette.

In 2010, Hughes released an entirely solo-recorded concept album titled Fangio.

In July of 2025, Hughes announced a new record, Half-Staff Blues, recorded with personnel from Australian indie-rock band Pop Filter (formerly of The Ocean Party) and produced by Liam "Snowy" Halliwell.

Throughout the 1990s and 2000s, Hughes also worked in copyediting, printing/typesetting, and graphic design. In 2001, Hughes published The Baseball Diaries, his account of 31 ballgames that he attended in 2000. His work as an automotive journalist includes pieces with Autoweek, Road & Track, and Jalopnik.

In 2024, Hughes began hosting a podcast called Tired: The Car Podcast For People Who Understand That Cars Are Bad, as a way of continuing his automotive journalism work.

== Personal life ==
Hughes's father was a flight-test technician for McDonnell Douglas, prompting a lasting interest in aviation.

Hughes currently resides in Rochester, NY.
