= Spectrum, 14th Century =

EP by Final Fantasy
- Released: September 30, 2008
- Recorded: May–August 2007
- Genre: Baroque pop
- Length: 17:43
- Label: Blocks Recording Club
- Producer: Unknown

Final Fantasy chronology
He Poos Clouds (2006)	Spectrum, 14th Century (2008)	Plays to Please (2008)

Professional ratings
Review scores
Source	Rating
Spectrum Culture	3.5/5.0
Pitchfork Media	(7.0/10)

Spectrum, 14th Century is an EP by the Canadian musician Owen Pallett, the second issued under the name of their project Final Fantasy. Pallett describes the songs as "fake field recordings" from the fictional country of Spectrum, which is also the setting of their 2010 album Heartland. Several musicians who play on the EP are also members of the indie band Beirut.

== Track listing ==
1. "Oh, Spectrum" – 2:00
2. "Blue Imelda" – 3:36
3. "The Butcher" – 4:12
4. "Cockatrice" – 3:17
5. "The Ballad of No-Face" – 4:38

== Personnel ==
- Musicians
  - Patrick Borjal
  - Perrin Cloutier
  - Paul Collins
  - Zach Condon
  - Kristin Ferebee
  - Jessica Kepler
  - Jon Natchez
  - Owen Pallett
  - Richard Reed Perry
  - Nick Petree
  - Kelly Pratt
  - Tracy Pratt
- Production
  - Recorded by Mark Lawson
  - Mastered by George Graves
  - Written and arranged by Owen Pallett
  - Design by Colin Bergh
  - Printed by Standard Form
