= The Creeping Nobodies =

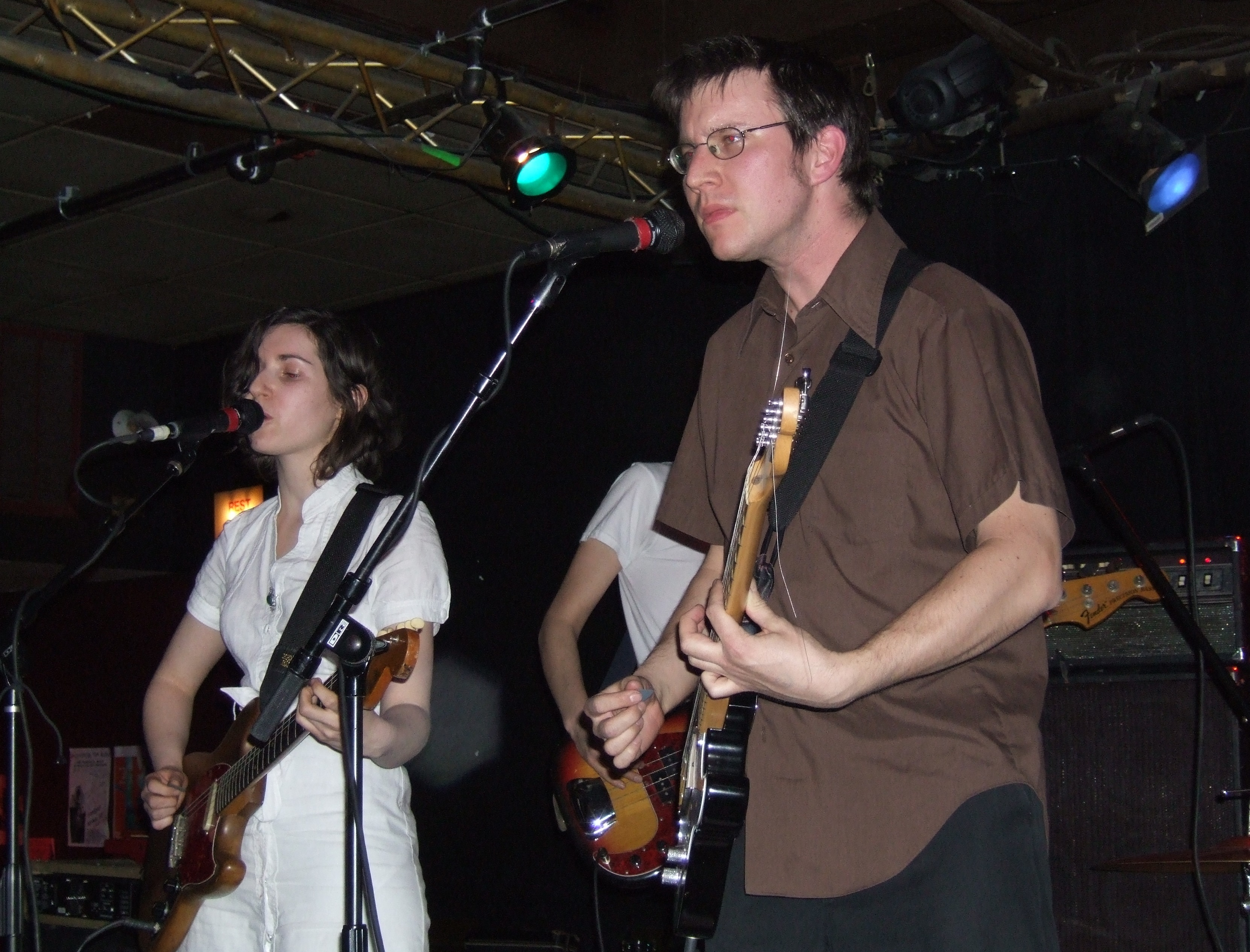
- The Creeping Nobodies, April 2007

Background information
- Origin: Toronto, Ontario, Canada
- Genres: Post-punk, Experimental
- Years active: 2001–2009
- Labels: Blocks Recording Club ([][][][][][]); Deleted Art; Kosher Rock Records; Bloodworks.
- Past members: Dennis Amos; Matthew McDonough; Sarah Richardson; Valerie Uher; Derek Westerholm; James Anderson; Julia Muth; Eric Abboud; Marco Landini; George Westerholm; Jaime Carrasco
- Website: www.thecreepingnobodies.com

The Creeping Nobodies were a Canadian rock band formed in Toronto, Ontario, in 2001. They played their final gig in 2009.

== History ==
The Creeping Nobodies began as a one-off performance for a tribute night to the UK band The Fall, and were put together by Derek Westerholm. The tribute night was held on September 21, 2001, at the El Mocambo club in Toronto, and the band name "The Creeping Nobodies" came from the name of a fictitious band mentioned on a Fall record sleeve. Immediately afterwards, the band became its own entity, investigating a wider range of musical influences.

The band released many of their records on Blocks Recording Club (sometimes referred to simply as [][][][][][] Recording), including Sound of Joy, recorded with Wharton Tiers, and a 2007 split 12" with the band Anagram. Blocks was a worker co-operative which also released records by Final Fantasy, Ninja High School, Katie Stelmanis, Lenin I Shumov, The Hank Collective, Fucked Up, and The Phonemes, among others. Other Creeping Nobodies CD and vinyl releases appeared on Deleted Art, fromSCRATCH, Bloodworks Music, Kosher Rock Records, and on a number of compilation albums.

The band line-up changed a number of times over the years, the most stable occurring between 2004–2007 consisting of Westerholm, Uher, Amos, McDonough, and Richardson. In 2007, Westerholm himself left prior to the band's last recordings and final tour in Europe. The band's last performance occurred in May 2009, and at that time The Creeping Nobodies were Dennis Amos, Sarah Richardson, Valerie Uher, and Matthew McDonough.

== Discography ==
=== Albums ===
1. Augurs & Auspices (Deleted Art, 2007)
2. Sound of Joy (Blocks, 2006)
3. Stop Movement Stop Loss (Blocks, 2004)

=== EPs and mini-albums ===
- Silver & Golden Apples 3" cdep (Akashic Records, 2007)
- Split cdep w/ Miranda (fromSCRATCH, 2007)
- Split 12" LP w/ Anagram (Blocks/Dead Astronaut, 2006)
- Half-Saboteur 12" LP (Bloodworks, 2005)
- I-X-U cd (Kosher Rock, 2002)

=== Splits ===
- Cockles 7" w/ These Are Powers (2008) Army of Bad Luck

=== Other appearances ===
- Galactic Dossier Issue No. 8 CD Compilation (2009) (Song "Beltane")
- Suoni Il Per Popolo Festival Compilation (2006) (Song "Hollow Stems, A Hunter's Will")
- Perverted By Mark E. - A Tribute to The Fall Zick Zack Compilation (2004) (Song "Wings")
- Toronto is Great! Blocks Compilation (2004) (Song "Heatseek")
- In The Film They Made Us A Little More Articulate Escape Goat Records Compilation (2003) (Song "Cold Hands")
- Rosco Re-define Rosco Magazine Sampler (2002) (Song "State")

== See also ==
- Music of Canada
- Canadian rock
- List of bands from Canada
- List of Canadian musicians
- Category:Canadian musical groups
