= Lewis Takes Off His Shirt =

Single by Owen Pallett

from the album Heartland
- Released: June 22, 2010
- Genre: Baroque pop
- Label: Domino
- Songwriter(s): Owen Pallett

Owen Pallett singles chronology
"Lewis Takes Action" (2010)	"Lewis Takes Off His Shirt" (2010)

"Lewis Takes Off His Shirt" is the second single from the album Heartland by Canadian musician Owen Pallett. It was released by Domino records in June 2010. It features one track from the album and five remixes. The week of July 12, 2010, the album was offered for free, to coincide with the announcement of fall 2012 tour dates.

The single was met with mixed to positive reviews.

== Track listing ==
7" single (DNO261)

Side A

1. "Lewis Takes Off His Shirt (album version)" - 5:12
2. "Lewis Takes Off His Shirt (Dan Deacon Remix)" - 7:12
3. "Lewis Takes Off His Shirt (Benoît Pioulard Remix)" - 3:04

Side B

1. "Lewis Takes Off His Shirt (CFCF Remix)" - 5:24
2. "Keep The Dog Quiet (Simon Bookish Remix)" - 5:25
3. "Midnight Directives (Max Tundra Remix)" - 2:52
