= He Poos Clouds =

Studio album by Final Fantasy
- Released: June 13, 2006
- Genre: Baroque pop, 21st-century classical music, chamber music
- Length: 37:24
- Label: Blocks Recording Club (Canada), Tomlab (elsewhere)

Final Fantasy chronology
Young Canadian Mothers (2006)	He Poos Clouds (2006)	Spectrum, 14th Century (2008)

Professional ratings
Review scores
Source	Rating
Allmusic	4/5 stars
Pitchfork Media	8.0/10

He Poos Clouds is the second studio album by Canadian indie musician Owen Pallett, under the pseudonym Final Fantasy. It was released on June 13, 2006, on Blocks Recording Club in Canada and Tomlab internationally.

The songs on the album (excluding the fifth and tenth tracks) are loosely connected to the eight schools of magic in the role-playing game Dungeons & Dragons, and the title track's lyrics ostensibly refer to the Nintendo video game series The Legend of Zelda, as well as The Chronicles of Narnia. Pallett has also said that the album is a reflection on how atheists confront death.

The track "This Lamb Sells Condos" refers to the Toronto real estate developer Brad J. Lamb, who had previously used the song's title phrase as an advertising slogan. In the song, Pallett imagines an argument between the developer and his wife that alludes heavily to various fashion designers.

The album cover art is by Robin Fry.

The album was named the winner of the 2006 Polaris Music Prize on September 18, 2006.

== Track listing ==
Eight songs are directly related to the eight schools of magic in Dungeons & Dragons: the school of magic correlating to the song is in parentheses.

1. "The Arctic Circle" – 4:24 (Abjuration)
2. "He Poos Clouds" – 3:31 (Illusion)
3. "This Lamb Sells Condos" – 4:39 (Conjuration)
4. "If I Were a Carp" – 4:03 (Necromancy)
5. "→" – 0:57
6. "I'm Afraid of Japan" – 3:56 (Enchantment)
7. "Song Song Song" – 4:31 (Evocation)
8. "Many Lives → 49 MP" – 2:56 (Divination)
9. "Do You Love?" – 3:03 (Transmutation)
10. "The Pooka Sings" – 5:25

== Personnel ==
- Owen Pallett – organ, viola, violin, harpsichord, piano, bass guitar, vocals
- Bethany Bergman – first violin
- John Marshman – violoncello
- Karen Moffatt – viola
- Ed Reifel – percussion
- Leon Taheny – percussion
- Jenny Thompson – second violin
- Doug Tielli – trombone
- Loretto Reid – concertina (1)
- Bob Wiseman – accordion (9)
- Lori Cullen – vocals (1, 3, 7, 10)
- Casey Mecija and Jenny Mecija – vocals (3, 7)
- Lex Vaughn – monologue (3)
- Aidan Koper, Jesse Foster, Tim Fagan – shouting (8)
