= The Phonemes =

The Phonemes were a Canadian indie pop band from Toronto, Ontario, active in the 2000s. A trio whose core members were vocalist and songwriter Magali Meagher, bassist Liz Forsberg, and drummer Matias Rozenberg, the group's two releases on Blocks Recording Club also featured guest contributions from Owen Pallett, Katie Crown, Bob Wiseman, Steve Kado, and Leon Taheny.

Meagher, a native of Guelph who moved to Toronto in 1998 and was a supporting musician in The Hidden Cameras, started the band in 2003. The band released its self-titled debut EP in 2004, and followed up with the full-length album There's Something We've Been Meaning to Do in 2007. In 2009, they contributed the non-album track "April, Let's Send His Colleagues an E-mail" to the compilation album Friends in Bellwoods II. They supported their music with some touring, both as a band and Meagher on her own in collaboration with Wiseman and Jason Trachtenburg.

The band did not release any further music after "April, Let's Send His Colleagues an E-mail". Meagher subsequently toured with Laura Barrett, Alysha Haugen, and Dana Snell (of The Bicycles) in Sheezer, an all-female Weezer tribute band.
