= Has a Good Home =

Studio album by Final Fantasy
- Released: February 12, 2005
- Recorded: 2004
- Genre: Indie rock
- Length: 45:48
- Label: Blocks Recording Club
- Producer: Leon Taheny

Final Fantasy chronology
Has a Good Home (2005)	Young Canadian Mothers (2006)

Professional ratings
Review scores
Source	Rating
Pitchfork Media	6.6/10

Has a Good Home is the debut studio album by the Canadian musician Owen Pallett, released under the name of their solo project Final Fantasy.

== Track listing ==
All songs written by Owen Pallett except where noted.

1. "None of You Will Ever See a Penny" – 2:32
2. "This Is the Dream of Win & Regine" – 3:24
3. "Your Light is Spent" – 3:06
4. "Furniture" – 2:02
5. "The CN Tower Belongs to the Dead" – 3:31
6. "Took You Two Years to Win My Heart" – 3:58
7. "The Chronicles of Sarnia" – 2:49
8. "↩" – 0:39
9. "Adventure.exe" – 2:01
10. "Library" – 3:11
11. "That's When the Audience Died" – 4:37
12. "Learn to Keep Your Mouth Shut, Owen Pallett" – 1:34
13. "An Arrow in the Side of Final Fantasy" – 2:45 (Kazumi Totaka, Owen Pallett)
14. "Please Please Please" – 3:29
15. "Better Than Worse" – 3:58 (Bobby Birdman, Owen Pallett)
16. "The Sea" – 2:15 (Not included on TomLab version)

== Track list information ==
- The Win and Regine referred to in "This Is The Dream of Win & Regine" are Win Butler and Regine Chassagne of Arcade Fire, the band with whom Pallett plays live (and often opens for) and for whom Pallett arranged the orchestral sections on their albums. The title of the song is also a reference to "(This Is) The Dream of Evan and Chan", a song by Dntel and Ben Gibbard that was the seed of the pair's collaboration as The Postal Service.
- "The Sea" also appears on the Final Fantasy Young Canadian Mothers 7" as "The Sea (Tenderizer)". This recording is distinctly different from the Has a Good Home recording, sounding softer and less like a sea-shanty, and favouring a mix of instruments as opposed to Pallett's violin and voice alone.
- "Adventure.exe" appeared on the Orange commercial, advertising the new Dolphin, Racoon, Panther and Canary packages.
- Track 13, "An Arrow in the Side of Final Fantasy", takes its melody directly from the song "Star Maze" from Super Mario Land 2: Six Golden Coins, which plays in the final level of the Space Zone.
- "Better Than Worse" was originally recorded by Bobby Birdman on his album Exhausted, The Cost Of. That album was entirely a cappella and was recorded while he was riding his bicycle. The instrumentation heard on Has A Good Home was written by Pallett.
