= In Conflict =

Studio album by Owen Pallett
- Released: May 27, 2014
- Recorded: Hotel2Tango, Sonovox Studio
- Genre: Baroque pop, electronic
- Length: 49:36
- Label: Domino/Secret City
- Producer: Owen Pallett

Owen Pallett chronology
A Swedish Love Story EP (2010)	In Conflict (2014)	Island (2020)

In Conflict is the fourth studio album by Canadian indie rock artist Owen Pallett, released May 27, 2014 on Domino Records and Secret City Records. The album features English ambient musician Brian Eno, who plays guitar and synthesizers as well as providing vocals. It was released on standard vinyl and CD as well as a limited edition double heavyweight LP. It was recorded by Mark Lawson. Canadian and Japanese special editions include exclusive bonus tracks.

== Critical reception ==
Professional ratings
Aggregate scores
Source	Rating
AnyDecentMusic?	7.6/10
Metacritic	82/100
Review scores
Source	Rating
AllMusic	4.5/5 stars
The A.V. Club	B+
Consequence of Sound	A−
The Guardian	4/5 stars
NME	8/10
Pitchfork	8.0/10
Q	4/5 stars
Rolling Stone	3.5/5 stars
Spin	8/10
Uncut	8/10

At Rolling Stone, Ned Raggett stated that "In Conflict is a pop treasure that's also a stirring, personal work of art." Sasha Geffen of Consequence of Sound wrote that "In Conflict is ominous, gloomy, and marked with some of the most playful arrangements Pallett’s laid to date." James Christopher Monger of AllMusic rated the album four-and-a-half stars, writing that the music contains a mixture of the "sugary opulence" reminiscent of Kishi Bashi and Jónsi and the "chilly refinement" akin to Björk circa 1997's Homogenic time period.

The album was a shortlisted nominee for the 2014 Polaris Music Prize.

== Track listing ==
No.	Title	Writer(s)	Length
1.	"I Am Not Afraid"	Owen Pallett	4:15
2.	"In Conflict"	R. Gordon / Owen Pallett / Matt Smith	4:13
3.	"On a Path"	Owen Pallett	4:33
4.	"Song for Five & Six"	Owen Pallett	4:31
5.	"The Secret Seven"	R. Gordon / Owen Pallett / Matt Smith	5:16
6.	"Chorale"	Owen Pallett	3:53
7.	"The Passions"	Owen Pallett	3:54
8.	"The Sky Behind the Flag"	R. Gordon / Owen Pallett / Matt Smith	4:22
9.	"→ (1)"	Owen Pallett	0:46
10.	"The Riverbed"	R. Gordon / Owen Pallett / Matt Smith	3:44
11.	"Infernal Fantasy"	R. Gordon / Owen Pallett / Matt Smith	3:22
12.	"Soldiers Rock"	R. Gordon / Owen Pallett / Matt Smith	4:56
13.	"→ (2)"	Owen Pallett	1:51
Total length:			49:36

Domino Double LP bonus track

- "Bridle & Bit"

== Personnel ==
- Owen Pallett – vocals, violin, viola, piano, ARP 2600, Nord G2X, Roland Juno-60, MiniMoog
- Matt Smith – bass, vocals
- Robbie Gordon – drums
- Brian Eno – synthesizers, guitar, vocals
- Thomas Gill – guitar
- Stef Schneider – percussion
- Daniela Gesundheit – vocals
- Czech FILMharmonic Orchestra
