= Heartland (Owen Pallett album) =

Studio album by Owen Pallett
- Released: January 12, 2010
- Recorded: 2009, The Greenhouse, Reykjavík (except tracks 3 and 12)
- Genre: Baroque pop
- Length: 46:40
- Label: Domino
- Producer: Owen Pallett

Owen Pallett chronology
| Plays to Please (2008) | Heartland (2010) | A Swedish Love Story (2010) |

Singles from Heartland
- 1. "Lewis Takes Action" Released: January 2010; 2. "Lewis Takes Off His Shirt" Released: March 29, 2010

Heartland is the third studio album by Canadian indie rock artist Owen Pallett, released January 12, 2010 on Domino Records. It was the first of Pallett's records to be released under their own name. Since the album was their first to be released in Japan, they wished to avoid generating confusion with the Final Fantasy video games from Square Enix, and to avoid infringing on any trademarks.

The record was mixed by New York producer Rusty Santos.

The album was a shortlisted nominee for the 2010 Polaris Music Prize.

== Concept and development ==
As a prelude to the album, Pallett recorded an EP: Spectrum, 14th Century. Both the EP and the subsequent full-length album are set in an imaginary realm called Spectrum. The songs on Heartland form a narrative concerning a "young, ultra-violent farmer" named Lewis, commanded by an all-powerful narrator named Owen. According to Pallett, the songs are one-sided dialogues with Lewis speaking to his creator.

In an interview, Pallett commented that the idea behind Heartland is "preposterous. I wanted to have this contained narrative that has the breadth of a Paul Auster short story." Michael Barclay of Maclean's states that the lyrics raise all sorts of theological questions about believers' relationship with a deity and the nature of fate, but the construct is just a blank canvas. Pallett said, "Really, it's just all about me. All records are about their singer. I was trying to play with that."

Pallett has noted that the album was "most inspired" by British electronic band Orchestral Manoeuvres in the Dark.

== Critical reception ==
Professional ratings
Aggregate scores
| Source | Rating |
|---|---|
| AnyDecentMusic? | 7.6/10 |
| Metacritic | 76/100 |
Review scores
| Source | Rating |
| AllMusic | 4/5 stars |
| The A.V. Club | A− |
| Consequence of Sound | 5/5 stars |
| The Guardian | 3/5 stars |
| NME | 7/10 |
| Pitchfork | 8.6/10 |
| Q | 3/5 stars |
| Slant Magazine | 4.5/5 stars |
| The Sunday Times | 4/5 stars |
| Uncut | 3/5 stars |

The album received positive reviews. In 2010, Heartland received Exclaim!'s No. 5 spot for best Pop & Rock Albums, with Exclaim! writer Andrea Warner remarking that "Heartland's themes (anger, isolation, loneliness) resonate, and the sonic nods to '70s disco and pop prove ridiculously catchy, bordering on radio-friendly."

== Track listing ==
1. "Midnight Directives" - 3:36
2. "Keep the Dog Quiet" - 3:10
3. "Mount Alpentine" - 0:49
4. "Red Sun No. 5" - 3:41
5. "Lewis Takes Action" - 2:54
6. "The Great Elsewhere" - 5:50
7. "Oh Heartland, Up Yours!" - 4:07
8. "Lewis Takes Off His Shirt" - 5:08
9. "Flare Gun" - 2:21
10. "E Is for Estranged" - 5:25
11. "Tryst with Mephistopheles" - 6:53
12. "What Do You Think Will Happen Now?" - 2:38

=== Japanese edition bonus tracks ===
13. "Midnight Directives" (Max Tundra remix) - 2:51
14. "Keep the Dog Quiet" (Simon Bookish remix) - 5:26

== Singles ==
The first single off the album was "Lewis Takes Action". It was released in January 2010 in a limited edition on 7" vinyl and includes one exclusive b-side called "A Watery Day". The second single, "Lewis Takes Off His Shirt", was released digitally on March 29, 2010. The music video for the song was directed by M. Blash, and it features the film and stage actress Alison Pill. "Lewis Takes Off His Shirt" was released on 12" vinyl on June 22, 2010. The single includes remixes by Dan Deacon, Benoît Pioulard, CFCF, Simon Bookish and Max Tundra.

== Personnel ==
- Written, arranged and produced by Owen Pallett
- Recorded by Sturla Mio Þórisson (except tracks 3 and 12)
- Mixed by Rusty Santos
- Mastered by Alan Douches
- Design and illustration by Colin Bergh
- Photography by Jimmy Limit
- Make-up by Allison Magpayo
- The Czech Symphony Strings
  - Directed by Adam Klemens
  - Recorded by Jan Holzner
- The St. Kitts' Winds
  - Contracted by John Marshman
  - Recorded by Jeff McMurrich, Matt Smith
  - Lisa Chisholm - bassoon
  - Micah Hellbrum - clarinet
  - Sarah Jeffrey - oboe, cor anglais
  - Leonie Wall - flute, piccolo
  - Gabe Radford - horn
  - David Pell - trombone
  - Mike Fedyshyn - trumpet
