= Traffic Department =

Traffic Department can refer to:

- Traffic Department (film), a 2013 Polish film
- Traffic Department 2192, a top down shooter game for IBM PC
