= Plays to Please =

- Alternate Cover

EP by Final Fantasy
- Released: October 2008
- Recorded: Studio 211, April 8th, 2008
- Genre: Baroque pop
- Length: 18:34
- Label: Blocks Recording Club/Slender Means Society
- Producer: Owen Pallett

Final Fantasy chronology
| Spectrum, 14th Century (2008) | Plays to Please (2008) | Heartland (2010) |

Plays to Please is an EP by Canadian musician Owen Pallett, under the name of their project Final Fantasy. It pays tribute to the songs of Toronto’s Alex Lukashevsky and Deep Dark United.

== Track listing ==
1. "Horsetail Feathers" – 3:25
2. "Ultimatum" – 2:44
3. "Moodring Band" – 2:54
4. "I Saved a Junky Once" – 1:53
5. "Nun or a Bawd" – 2:42
6. "Crush-Love-Crush" – 4:56

== Personnel ==
- Leonie Wall - flute
- Andrew Bird - whistling
- Joe Orlowski - clarinet
- Rob Carley - saxophone
- Michael Fedyshyn - trumpet
- David Pell - trombone
- Owen Pallett - piano and celeste
- Nick Fraser - drums
- Ed Reifel - percussion
- Paul Mathew - double bass
- violins
  - Bethany Bergman
  - Sandy Baron
  - Jeremy Bell
  - Drew Jurecka
  - Czaba Kozco
  - Aya Myagawa
  - Eric Paetkau
  - Nancy Kershaw
  - Rebecca Wolkstein
- violas
  - Karen Moffatt
  - Kathleen Kajioka
  - Josh Greenlaw
- cellos
  - John Marshman
  - Rebecca Morton
  - Amy Laing
