= Sasha Frere-Jones bibliography =

Bibliography of Sasha Frere-Jones

List of the published works of Sasha Frere-Jones, the writer and musician.

== Essays and reporting ==
- Frere-Jones, Sasha (December 24, 2007). "Stairway to Here". The Critics. Pop Music. The New Yorker. pp. 128–130.
- — (November 17, 2008). "The spirit moves". Goings on About Town. Critic's Notebook. The New Yorker. Vol. 84, no. 37. p. 16.
- — (November 24, 2008). "Sass and cadence". The Critics. Pop Music. The New Yorker. Vol. 84, no. 38. pp. 124–126.
- — (January 12, 2009). "Into the woods : the Bon Iver sound". The Critics. Pop Music. The New Yorker. Vol. 84, no. 44. pp. 70–71.
- — (26 October 2009). "Rock the Bells". Goings on About Town. Critic's Notebook. The New Yorker. Vol. 84, no. 38. pp. 124–126.
- — (8 February 2010). "Unsound opinion". Goings on About Town. Critic's Notebook. The New Yorker. Vol. 85, no. 48. p. 9.
- — (22 March 2010). "Big Step". Goings on About Town. Critic's Notebook. The New Yorker. Vol. 86, no. 5. p. 13.
- — (April 19, 2010). "Leash Laws". Goings on About Town. Critic's Notebook. The New Yorker. Vol. 86, no. 9. p. 10.
- — (May 24, 2010). "Noise Control: On the Border of Music and Sound". The Critics. Pop Music. The New Yorker. Vol. 86, no. 14. pp. 80–81.
- — (November 1, 2010). "Best Squeak Ever". Goings on About Town. Critic's Notebook. The New Yorker. Vol. 86, no. 34. p. 28.
- — (8 November 2010). "Black Power". Goings on About Town. Critic's Notebook. The New Yorker. Vol. 86, no. 35. p. 8. Bands The Black Angels and Black Mountain on tour.
- — (April 4, 2011). "On Display". Goings on About Town. Critic's Notebook. The New Yorker. Vol. 87, no. 7. p. 8. LCD Soundsystem.
- — (October 10, 2011). "The Dark Arts". The Critics. Pop Music. The New Yorker.
- — (November 14, 2011). "Plug and Play". The Critics. Pop Music. The New Yorker. Vol. 87, no. 36. pp. 88–89. 'The endless inspiration of The Fall.'
- — (January 16, 2012). "On the Floor". The Critics. Pop Music. The New Yorker. Vol. 87, no. 44. pp. 76–77. Electronic dance music.
- — (February 13–20, 2012). "The sound of success". The Critics. Pop Music. The New Yorker. 88 (1): 102–104. Bibcode:2011NaPho...5..184P. doi:10.1038/nphoton.2011.24. Rick Ross.
- — (April 16, 2012). "Selektion Process". Goings on About Town. Critic's Notebook. The New Yorker. Vol. 88, no. 9. p. 12. Modeselektor
- — (April 16, 2012). "Salvation Army : Spiritualized takes simplicity to great heights". The Critics. Pop Music. The New Yorker. Vol. 88, no. 9. pp. 114–115.
- — (November 26, 2012). "Secret Life of Midi". Goings on About Town. Critic's Notebook. The New Yorker. Vol. 88, no. 37. p. 12. Dawn of Midi.
- — (November 26, 2012). "Hanna and Her Sisters". The Critics. Pop Music. The New Yorker. Vol. 88, no. 37. pp. 80–81. Kathleen Hanna and Bikini Kill.
- — (February 11–18, 2013). "Rocky Road". The Critics. Pop Music. The New Yorker. Vol. 89, no. 1. pp. 110–111. Rakim Mayers, aka A$AP Rocky.
- — (March 4, 2013). "Atomic clock : Thom Yorke's search for the perfect beat". The Critics. Pop Music. The New Yorker. Vol. 89, no. 3. pp. 76–77. Thom Yorke and Atoms for Peace.
- — (March 11, 2013). "In New York". Goings on About Town. Critic's Notebook. The New Yorker. Vol. 89, no. 4. p. 6. The Music of Prince tribute concert at Carnegie Hall.
- — (March 18, 2013). "Labyrinth : the path that leads from David Bowie to us". The Critics. Pop Music. The New Yorker. Vol. 89, no. 5. pp. 84–85.
- — (April 1, 2013). "Boyz II man : has Justin Timberlake stopped growing?". The Critics. Pop Music. The New Yorker. Vol. 89, no. 7. pp. 72–74.
- — (April 15, 2013). "Look sharp : The Knife fuses performance and percussion". The Critics. Pop Music. The New Yorker. Vol. 89, no. 9. pp. 70–72.
- — (April 22, 2013). "Joy to the world". Goings on About Town. Critic's Notebook. The New Yorker. Vol. 89, no. 10. p. 20. The Joy Formidable.
- — (May 6, 2013). "Terra cognita : Savages carefully reinvents the wheel". The Critics. Pop Music. The New Yorker. Vol. 89, no. 12. pp. 84–85.
- — (November 4, 2013). "The dark lord : Robin Carolan's Tri Angle record label". The Critics. Pop Music. The New Yorker. Vol. 89, no. 35. pp. 110–111.
- — (November 25, 2013). "Shady and the lady : Eminem and M.I.A. battle desires and doubts". The Critics. Pop Music. The New Yorker. Vol. 89, no. 38. pp. 118–120.
- — (March 3, 2014). "Sahara Blues : Tinariwen's desert sound". The Critics. Pop Music. The New Yorker. Vol. 90, no. 2. pp. 82–83.
- — (March 17, 2014). "Sneak peak : St. Vincent's stealthy magnificence". The Critics. Pop Music. The New Yorker. Vol. 90, no. 4. pp. 66–68.
- — (April 14, 2014). "Metal heart : Pharmakon and the art of noise". Goings on About Town. Night Life. The New Yorker. Vol. 90, no. 8. p. 16.
- — (April 14, 2014). "Improv everywhere". The Critics. Pop Music. The New Yorker. Vol. 90, no. 8. pp. 68–70.
- — (August 25, 2014). "Cross country : Nashville expands its range". The Critics. Pop Music. The New Yorker. Vol. 90, no. 24. pp. 72–73.
- — (December 15, 2014). "The PC brigade : two local bands revive the city's rock scene". Goings on About Town. Night Life. The New Yorker. Vol. 90, no. 40. p. 12.
- — (December 22–29, 2014). "Test patterns : unexpected and familiar pleasures from TV on the Radio". The Critics. Pop Music. The New Yorker. Vol. 90, no. 41. pp. 140–142.
- — (January 12, 2015). "Second coming : D'Angelo's triumphant return". The Critics. Pop Music. The New Yorker. Vol. 90, no. 43. pp. 62–64.

== Blog posts ==
- Frere-Jones, Sasha (19 October 2009). "Setlist: Sleigh Bells". Blog: Sasha Frere-Jones. Sleigh Bells
