= Brad Lamb =

Brad Lamb may refer to:

- Brad J. Lamb (born 1961), Toronto real estate broker and property developer
- Brad Lamb (American football) (born 1967), former wide receiver with the Buffalo Bills
- Brad Lamb (golfer), Australian golfer in the 2008 Open Championship
