= Lewis Takes Action =

Single by Owen Pallett

from the album Heartland
- Released: January 5, 2010
- Genre: Baroque pop
- Label: Domino
- Songwriter(s): Owen Pallett

Owen Pallett singles chronology
"Alphabet Series: X" (2007)	"Lewis Takes Action" (2010)

"Lewis Takes Action" is the first single from the album Heartland by Canadian musician Owen Pallett. It was released by Domino records in January 2010 in a limited edition on 7" vinyl. It features one track from the album and one exclusive track called "A Watery Day". The official newsletter concerning "Lewis Takes Action" called it a "super limited edition" without giving further details of how many copies were pressed. The single was only sold through the Domino online store; however there was a chance to win a signed copy of the record by downloading the mp3 version of the track "Lewis Takes Action".

== Track listing ==
7" single (DNO248)

1. "Lewis Takes Action" – 2:54
2. "A Watery Day" – 4:00

== Personnel ==
- Lewis Takes Action
  - Owen Pallett: electric bass, rings, singing, viola, violin
  - Jeremy Gara: kit
  - John Marshman: cello
  - Ed Reifel: cymbals, snare
  - Matt Smith: background vocals
  - Rusty Santos: mix
- A Watery Day
  - Owen: Moog, violin, mix
