= A Swedish Love Story EP =

A Swedish Love Story

EP by Owen Pallett
- Released: September 28, 2010
- Genre: Baroque pop
- Length: 16:53
- Label: Domino
- Producer: Rusty Santos, Owen Pallett

Owen Pallett chronology
Heartland (2010)	A Swedish Love Story (2010)	Export [Demo EP] (2010)

A Swedish Love Story is an EP released by Canadian musician Owen Pallett. Following Heartland, this is Pallett's second release under their own name rather than their previous stage name, Final Fantasy.

== Critical reception ==
Professional ratings
Aggregate scores
Source	Rating
Metacritic	78/100
Review scores
Source	Rating
Pitchfork	7.4/10 link
PopMatters	8/10 link
Drowned In Sound	8/10 link

The EP was received favorably, generally scoring slightly below its predecessor, Heartland. Pitchfork scored the release at 7.4 out of 10.

== Track listing ==
No.	Title	Length
1.	"A Man with No Ankles"	4:20
2.	"Scandal at the Parkade"	3:18
3.	"Honour the Dead, or Else"	4:51
4.	"Don't Stop"	4:24
Total length:		16:53

== Personnel ==
- Produced by Rusty Santos and Owen Pallett
- Mixed by Rusty Santos
- Engineering assistance from Brian Thorn at The Magic Shop
- Mastered by Alan Douches at West West Side Music
- Published by Open Wallett
- Design by Colin Bergh
- Owen Pallett – violin, synths, keyboards, vocals
- Thomas Gill – guitar
- Shahzad Ismaily – drums, electric bass, percussion\
- Rob Moose – violin
- Nadia Sirota – viola
- Clarice Jensen – cello

== Artwork ==
The packaging for the release displays four altered pieces of artwork, credited as follows:

- Scentless Mayweed, 2007, Roger Whitehead
- Carolus Linnaeus in Laponian costume, 1853, Hendrik Hollander
- Linnaea Borealis, 1901, Carl Axel Magnus Lindman
- Untitled, 2009, Agnes Thor

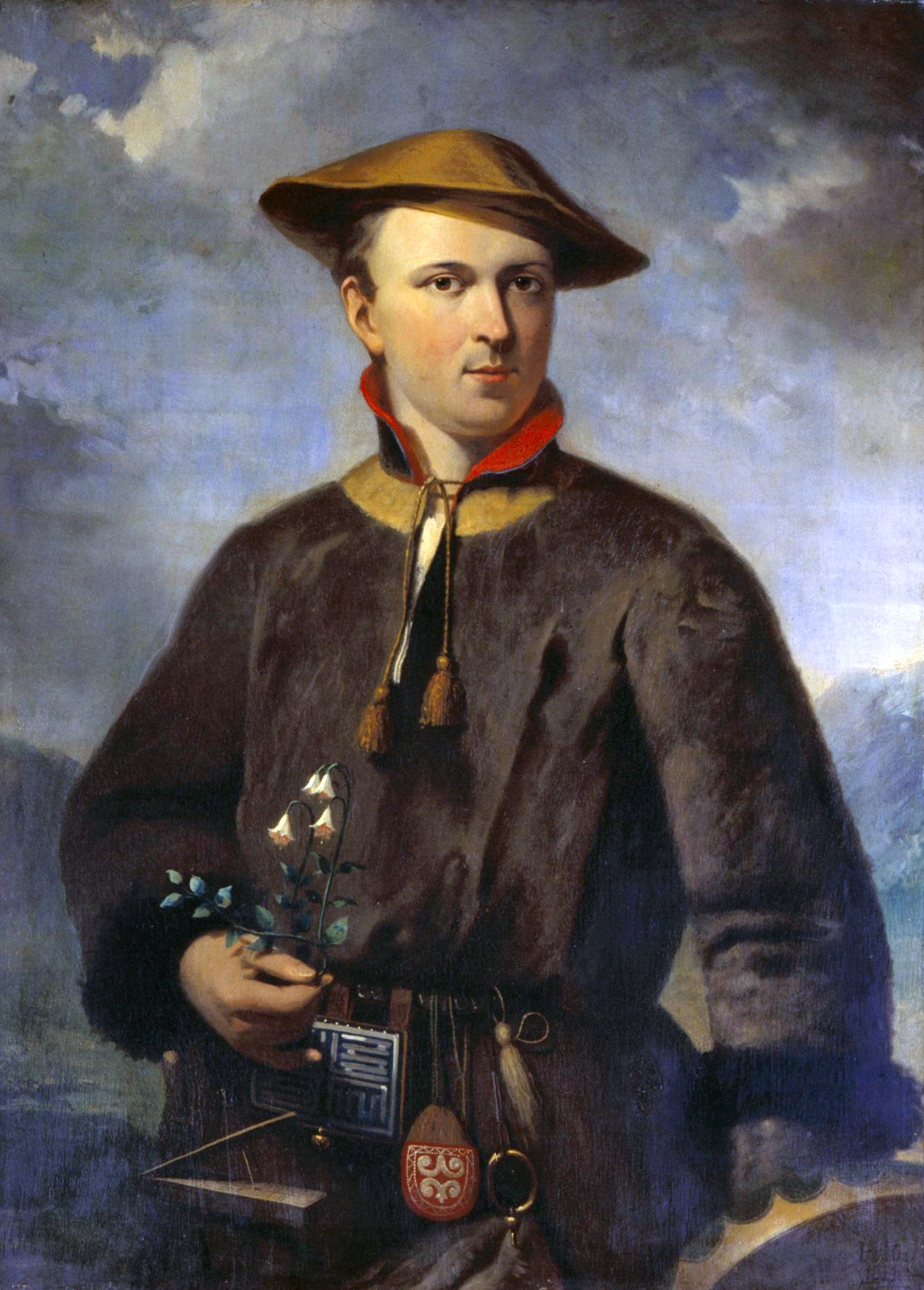
Carolus Linnaeus in Laponian costume by Hendrik Hollander, 1853

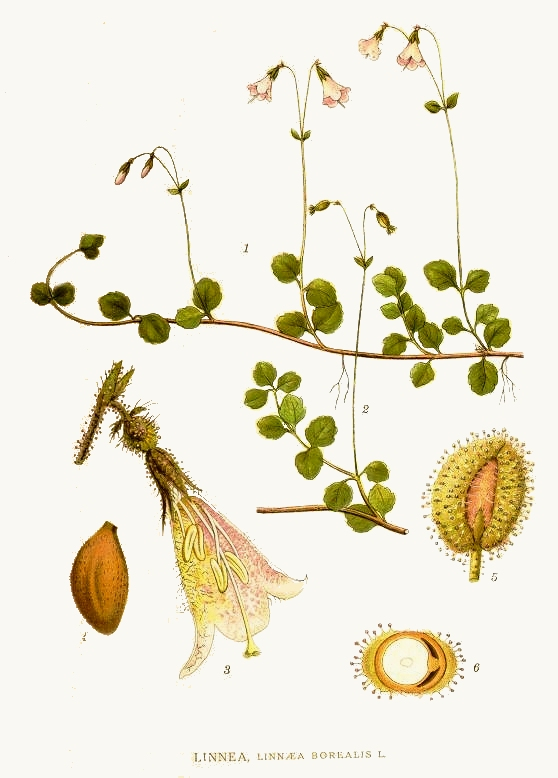
Linnaea Borealis by Lindman, 1901
