= Arts & Crafts: X =

Compilation album by Various artists
- Released: May 28, 2013
- Genres: Indie rock, indie pop
- Label: Arts & Crafts

Various artists chronology
Arts & Crafts: 2003−2013 (2013)	Arts & Crafts: X (2013)

Arts & Crafts: X is a compilation album, released on May 28, 2013. Featuring artists signed to the Canadian record label Arts & Crafts in collaboration, it is the second compilation released by the label, following Arts & Crafts: 2003−2013, as part of its tenth anniversary celebrations.

== Track listing ==
1. "Day of the Kid" – Broken Social Scene and Years - 5:48
2. "Bizarre Love Triangle" (New Order) - Apostle of Hustle and Zeus - 3:42
3. "Homage" - Feist and Timber Timbre - 4:09
4. "Era" - Still Life Still and Zulu Winter - 4:08
5. "The Chauffeur" (Duran Duran) - The Hidden Cameras and Snowblink - 4:34
6. "Time Can Be Overcome" (The Constantines) - The Darcys and Ra Ra Riot - 4:01
7. "Nothing Good Comes to Those Who Wait" - Chilly Gonzales and Stars - 3:37
8. "Lonely Is as Lonely Does" - Hayden and Jason Collett - 4:10
9. "Lady Bird" (Nancy Sinatra and Lee Hazlewood) - Gold & Youth and Trust - 3:15
10. "Chances Are" (Johnny Mathis and Liza Minnelli)- Amy Millan and Dan Mangan - 4:39
11. "Waltz #2 (XO)" (Elliott Smith) - Dan Mangan and Zeus (iTunes-only bonus track)
