= Snowblink =

- Origin: Toronto, Ontario, Canada
- Genres: Indie pop
- Years active: 1988–present
- Labels: Out of This Spark; Arts & Crafts; Fire Records
- Members: Daniela Gesundheit; Dan Goldman
- Website: http://snowblinksays.com/

Snowblink is an indie pop band based in Toronto, Ontario, Canada. Snowblink is now a duo of singer/songwriter Daniela Gesundheit and multi-instrumentalist Dan Goldman. The band has opened for Feist, Jeff Tweedy, Owen Pallett, Timber Timbre, Ohbijou, Great Lake Swimmers, and The Hidden Cameras.

== History ==
An earlier version of Snowblink began in Sherman Oaks, California, Gesundheit's hometown, before she moved to Toronto in 2008.

Gesundheit and Goldman released three albums independently before signing to Out of This Spark in Canada and Fire Records internationally in 2010; the two labels jointly reissued the band's 2008 album Long Live in 2011. The album Inner Classics followed in 2012 on Arts & Crafts.

Gesundheit also participated in the 2011 documentary film series National Parks Project, visiting Cape Breton Highlands National Park with Tony Dekker, Old Man Luedecke, and filmmaker Keith Behrman. In 2013, the band collaborated with The Hidden Cameras on a cover of Duran Duran's "The Chauffeur" for the compilation album Arts & Crafts: X.

In 2016, Snowblink released Returning Current, drawing from Gesundheit's interest in the ocean and her familiarity with cantorial and Indian religious music. The band collaborated with Feist on the track "How Now". The album features drumming by Phil Melanson and production by Robbie Lackritz, and reviews were generally positive.

In 2018, Snowblink contributed the song "Outdoor Hotel" to the compilation album The Al Purdy Songbook.

== Discography ==
- Interim at Afton Villa (2005)
- My Oh My Avalanche (2006)
- Long Live (2008, rereleased in 2011)
- Inner Classics (2012)
- Returning Current (2016)
