= Dysnomia =

Dysnomia can refer to the following:

- Anomic aphasia, also known as Dysnomia, a condition affecting memory
- Dysnomia, an album by Dawn of Midi
- Dysnomia (deity), "Lawlessness" - a child of the mythological Greek goddess Eris
- Dysnomia (genus), a genus of freshwater mussels now known as Epioblasma
- Dysnomia (moon), a moon of the dwarf planet Eris

== See also ==
- Dyssomnia
