= Jesse Ewles =

Canadian filmmaker

Jesse Ewles (Yules)
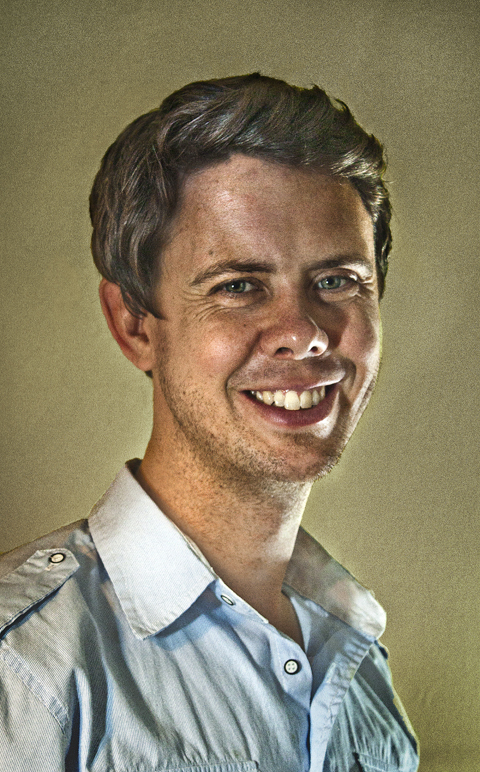
- Canadian Filmmaker Jesse Yules (Ewles) 2013
- Born: December 13, 1981 (age 44)
- Education: Sheridan College
- Occupations: Music video director, producer
- Years active: 2007–present

Jesse Ewles (aka Jesse Yules; born December 13, 1981) is a Canadian independent filmmaker based in Toronto, Ontario, Canada. Ewles has adopted the alternate spelling "Yules", for use on his feature film projects.

Ewles has directed music videos for the bands Grizzly Bear, Of Montreal and Owen Pallett. In January 2010, he completed his first short film for Bravo! TV entitled Kingdom of Frogs. His main influences include Charlie Kaufman, Jan Švankmajer, Julian Schnabel, and William Blake as well as Public Broadcasting animations from the 1970s produced by the CBC and PBS. Fables are a common theme in his work. On December 22, 2008, he was recognized by the web blog (videos.antville.org) as the best unsigned director of 2008. In November 2012, Yules finished writing his first feature screenplay under the working title SOMA. It tells the story of a homeless drug dealer who gets unwanted fame from the internet. The film was later retitled Impostor Syndrome. Principal photography was completed in October 2016. In October 2020, Yules began work on a film about the effect conspiracy theories are having on romantic relationships. The working title is Miriam.

== In development ==
- Miriam (In development, Drama / Horror / QAnon)
- The Undective (In development, Drama / Scifi / Cryptozoology)
- Old Smith Rupe (In development, Western / Fantasy)
