= Daniela Gesundheit =

Daniela Gesundheit (born 15 April 1982) is a singer, songwriter, musician, composer, lyricist, and cantor living between Los Angeles, California and Toronto, Ontario. Daniela Gesundheit holds a BA in music from Wesleyan University, where she focused on South Indian classical voice, experimental composition, and poetry.

From 2003 to 2005 Daniela had a band, Fontanel, with LA-based drummer Barbara Gruska (The Belle Brigade). She also founded and is currently active with the indie-pop band Snowblink, a duo with Dan Goldman. Snowblink's debut record, Long Live, was named an "essential release" by London's Sunday Times and they have received a NNNN album and performance review from NOW magazine in Toronto. Earlier versions of Snowblink included Andrew VanWyngarden and Ben Goldwasser of MGMT, artists David Wilson and Frank Lyon, and film critic and archivist Max Goldberg as backup singers. Caley Monahon Ward was also an early collaborator.

Daniela is currently a member of the band HYDRA, which includes herself, Feist and Ariel Engle of AroarA. Daniela has been a featured vocalist (alongside Brian Eno) for Owen Pallett on his 2015 album In Conflict, as well as Zammuto's 2014 album Anchor. Daniela and her band Snowblink performed alongside Feist at the 2012 Polaris Prize Gala. As part of Snowblink Daniela has opened for Timber Timbre, Jeff Tweedy, Owen Pallett, Ohbijou, Great Lake Swimmers, and The Hidden Cameras. Daniela is also a published poet.

Daniela Gesundheit has been a Dora Mavor Moore Award nominee for "Outstanding Sound Design/Composition." She has also created soundtrack compositions for The Water Thief by Sean Frey and Amy Siegel, Al Purdy was Here by Brian Johnson (TIFF), NPR's Radiolab, Stand Clear of the Closing Doors (Tribeca Film Festival), and The National Parks Project. She also performed with Michael Ondaatje for Jason Collett's Basement Review (2012) and with members of the Aberta Ballet in 2013 at the Banff Centre.

Daniela performed with celebrated acoustic Biologist Katy Payne. This performance placed Payne's lecture discussing her findings about humpback whales and African elephants within an original musical context that involved Daniela and her band Snowblink "to see what they might discover about group identity, distance, competition, innovation, and empathy." The event was staged at the Berkeley Art Museum as part of the exhibition "The Possible" and at The Music Gallery in Toronto.

== Discography ==
As Lead Singer:

- Snowblink: Returning Current, 2016
- Snowblink: Inner Classics: 2011
- Snowblink: Long Live, 2008
- Snowblink: My Oh My Avalanche, 2006
- Snowblink: Interim At Afton Villa, 2004

As Featured Vocalist:

- Owen Pallett: In Conflict, 2015
- Zammuto: Anchor, 2014
- John Southworth: Human Cry, 2013
- Alex Lukashevsky: Too Late Blues, 2012
- Luxury Pond: Self-Titled, 2009
- Brendan Canning: You Gots to Chill, 2013
- Bruce Peninsula: A Mountain Is A Mouth, 2009
- Chris Hadfield: Songs From A Tin Can
