= Island (Owen Pallett album) =

Studio album by Owen Pallett
- Released: May 22, 2020
- Length: 59:43
- Label: Domino
- Producer: Owen Pallett

Owen Pallett chronology
In Conflict (2014)	Island (2020)

Island is the fifth studio album by Canadian artist Owen Pallett. It was released on May 22, 2020, by Domino Recording Company.

The album was a longlisted nominee for the 2020 Polaris Prize.

== Critical reception ==
Professional ratings
Aggregate scores
Source	Rating
Metacritic	83/100
Review scores
Source	Rating
Beats Per Minute	87%
Clash	8/10
Exclaim!	8/10
MusicOMH	4/5 stars
Pitchfork	7.7/10

Island was met with widespread acclaim reviews from critics. Chris Gee of The Exclaim! reviewed "Island is a record that exists in a lavish fantasy world built upon identity struggles and perfectly ripe orchestrations – qualities we have come to expect from the multi-instrumentalist."

== Track listing ==
All tracks written by Owen Pallett.

Island track listing
No.	Title	Length
1.	"→ (i)"	3:05
2.	"Transformer"	3:54
3.	"Paragon of Order"	5:56
4.	"→ (ii)"	0:23
5.	"The Sound of the Engines"	3:53
6.	"Perseverance of the Saints"	3:54
7.	"Polar Vortex"	2:57
8.	"→ (iii)"	0:52
9.	"A Bloody Morning"	5:52
10.	"Fire-Mare"	4:19
11.	"Lewis Gets Fucked Into Space"	4:56
12.	"→ (iv)"	3:37
13.	"In Darkness"	6:27
14.	"Paragon of Order" (version)	5:03
15.	"Fire-Mare" (version)	4:35
Total length:		59:43
