= Young Canadian Mothers =

EP by Final Fantasy
- Released: January 2006
- Recorded: Unknown
- Genre: Indie rock
- Length: 12:03
- Label: Escape Goat Records
- Producer: Unknown

Final Fantasy chronology
Has A Good Home (2005)	Young Canadian Mothers (2006)	He Poos Clouds (2006)

Young Canadian Mothers is an EP by the Canadian musician Owen Pallett, released in 2006 under the name Final Fantasy. It was limited to 500 copies.

== Track listing ==
1. "This Is the Dream of Emma & Cam" – 3:11
2. "The Sea (Tenderizer)" – 3:07
3. "Spell for a Weak Heart" – 3:00
4. "Peach, Plum, Pear" (Joanna Newsom cover) – 2:45

== Personnel ==
- Recorded and mixed at MSTRKFT and Go Get
  - By Leon, Owen and Al
- Drum programming on "Spell For a Weak Heart" created by ZZT-OOP
- Backing vocals on '"The Sea" by Amy L
- Illustration by Nicholas Sung
- Design by Patrick
