= Traffic Department 2192 =

1994 video game

- Developer(s): P-Squared Productions
- Publisher(s): Safari Software
- Designer(s): John Pallett-Plowright, Robert A. Allen, Michael Pallett-Plowright
- Artist(s): Samuel Goldstein, Bruce Hsu, John Pallett‑Plowright, Michael Taylor
- Writer(s): Christopher Perkins
- Composer(s): Robert A. Allen
- Platform(s): DOS
- Release: NA: April 30, 1994
- Genre(s): Multidirectional shooter
- Mode(s): Single-player

Traffic Department 2192 is a top down multidirectional shooter for IBM PC compatibles, developed by P-Squared Productions and released in 1994 by Safari Software and distributed by Epic MegaGames. The full game contains three episodes (Alpha, Beta, Gamma), each with twenty missions, in which the player pilots a "hoverskid" about a war-torn city to complete certain mission objectives. The game was released as freeware under the Creative Commons License CC BY-ND 3.0 in 2007.

== Plot ==
The player takes on the role of Lieutenant Marta Louise Velasquez, a hot-tempered young pilot working for the Traffic Department in the city of Vulthaven, on the planet Seche, in the year 2192. Since the vile gang known as the Vultures began attempts to take over the planet, the Traffic Department has become the only law-enforcement in the city. As the game's introduction explains, fourteen years earlier, Velasquez saw her father Ric killed by the Vultures while returning from garrison duty.

The story deals with Velasquez's aggressive attitude towards everybody she meets, apparently caused by the painful memory of her father. Intertwined is a complex science fiction story of cloning, mind control, and cybernetics, combined with a tale of betrayal, infiltration, and warfare.

== Development ==
The game was scored by Robert A. Allen. However, John Pallett-Plowright wrote Satair, and his 13-year-old brother, Michael Pallett-Plowright, also known as Owen Pallett, wrote Menu, Vulture, Intro 2, and Death.

The most notable aspect of the series is the detailed and often complex script by Christopher Perkins. The game features lengthy cutscenes before and after each of the sixty missions. Each cutscene spans across multiple scenes, giving the game's storyline a reported length of 50,000 words. The cutscenes are made up of conversations between two or more characters on the screen with static 3D images of locations cut between each scene. The game's dialogue features both profanity and sexually-suggestive language, but there is an option at the start of the game to disable all mature content.

Over the years the series has developed a small dedicated fan base that has produced Lego models of the various "skids" in the series.
