= Leo Chadburn =

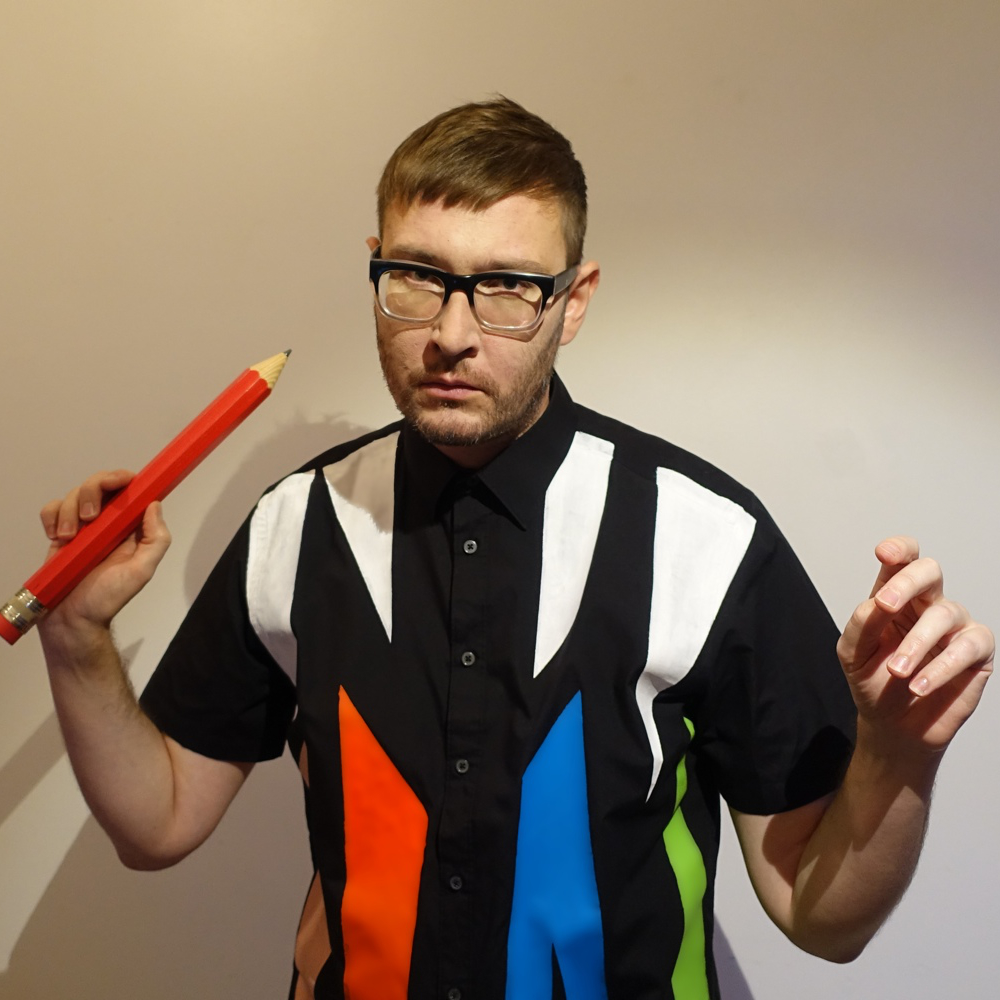

Background information
- Also known as: Simon Bookish
- Born: 1978 (age 46–47) Coalville, United Kingdom
- Genres: classical, art rock, electronic music
- Occupations: vocalist, composer, producer, recording artist
- Labels: Tomlab
- Website: www.leochadburn.com

Leo Chadburn (born 1978), formerly known by the stage name Simon Bookish, is a British musician and composer known for his work in experimental, electronic, pop, and classical music. He previously recorded under the pseudonym Simon Bookish, and since 2015 has released music under his real name. His music has been broadcast on BBC Radio 1, BBC Radio 3, BBC Radio 6 Music, and Resonance FM. Originally from Coalville, Leicestershire, he moved to London and trained at the Guildhall School of Music and Drama from 1997 to 2001.

== Work as Simon Bookish ==
Chadburn released three solo albums under the name Simon Bookish. The first two, Unfair / Funfair (2006) and Trainwreck / Raincheck (2007), combined his voice with synthesizers and laptop computers. His use of spoken word on Trainwreck / Raincheck and in live performances drew comparisons with "Bowie and Baudrillard, Burroughs and Byrne". His third album, Everything/Everything (2008) featured an ensemble of brass instruments, saxophones, Farfisa organ, piano, and harp. Chadburn describes this album as "a big band song cycle about science and information".

Chadburn's most recent release as Simon Bookish was Red and Blue EP (2015), an experimental piece based on correspondence between Margaret Thatcher and Ronald Reagan.

As Simon Bookish, he provided remixes of songs for bands and artists such as Grizzly Bear, Franz Ferdinand, The Organ, Owen Pallett, Seb Rochford, and Late of the Pier. He has also contributed tracks to the compilation albums Worried Noodles (2007), a compilation of songs with lyrics by artist David Shrigley, and The Wall Re-built! (2010), which celebrated the 30th anniversary of Pink Floyd's The Wall, for Mojo Magazine.

== Work as Leo Chadburn ==
=== Classical works ===
Chadburn has written a number of works for classical music groups. These include Unison: Things Are Getting Worse for a large ensemble of pianists, X Chairman Maos, written for the ensemble Apartment House and performed at the De La Warr Pavilion to coincide with their Andy Warhol exhibition in 2011, and Five Loops for the Bathyscaphe (2018), commissioned by the Britten Sinfonia.

His string quartet, The Indistinguishables was written for the Canadian quartet Quatuor Bozzini and performed at the 2014 Huddersfield Contemporary Music Festival. A performance by the quartet at Milton Court (Guildhall School of Music) in March 2019 with Gemma Saunders as narrator was broadcast on BBC Radio 3 in September 2019. His piece for chamber ensemble, Freezywater, commissioned by the Wigmore Hall, won a 2016 British Composer Award. Chadburn was nominated for a second British Composer Award the following year, for his choral piece Affix Stamp Here, written for the vocal ensemble EXAUDI.

Chadburn is currently an associate composer of the London Symphony Orchestra, who performed his piece Brown Leather Sofa in 2013.

Chadburn received an Ivor Novello Award nomination at The Ivors Classical Awards 2024. His piece English Dancing Master, for pre-recorded voices and string quartet, was nominated for Best Small Chamber Composition.

=== Albums (as Leo Chadburn) ===
Chadburn has released four solo albums under his own name, the most recent of which was Sleep in the Shadow of the Alternator (2025), which features Chadburn narrating the landscape of post-industrial Britain. His earlier releases include Epigram / Microgram (2013), an instrumental album which utilises the Casio CZ-101 synthesizer as its only sound source, and The Subject / The Object (2020), which comprises two 20-minute long tracks of spoken word stream of consciousness and drone music.

=== Collaborations ===
Chadburn has collaborated on a number of projects with visual artists. In 2009, he wrote the score for Richard Grayson's video installation The Golden Space City of God (exhibited at Matt's Gallery, London and Artpace, San Antonio), which featured a choir shot on location in Texas singing cult religious texts.

In 2012, he collaborated with the artist Tanya Axford on a piece entitled The Path Made by a Boat in Sound (Three Down) for the Whitstable Biennale, and with video artist Jennet Thomas, on her work School of Change, a "sci-fi musical film", again exhibited at Matt's Gallery.

He went on to work with the conceptual artist Cerith Wyn Evans on a choral work for performance at the Irish Museum of Modern Art in 2013, based on Samuel Beckett's prose text Imagination Dead Imagine.

Chadburn has also written music for the theatre, working with the Royal National Theatre on a new musical score for their 2007 production of The Caucasian Chalk Circle, in which he also played the part of "The Singer".

As a performer, he has contributed to the albums of Leafcutter John, Max de Wardener, Patrick Wolf, Serafina Steer and Saint Etienne, credited with recorders, bass clarinet and vocals. He is also credited as a producer on classical percussionist Joby Burgess' album 24 Lies Per Second (2013).

He has occasionally performed works by other experimental composers, including John Cage, Gavin Bryars, Christopher Fox, Frederic Rzewski (whose piece Coming Together he presented at the first London Contemporary Music Festival in 2013) and Jennifer Walshe (whose work he performed at the 2017 London Contemporary Music Festival). Alongside actor Gemma Saunders, Chadburn recorded a spoken word version of artist On Kawara's twenty volume book, One Million Years [Past and Future], which was released as a limited edition four CD set.

=== Writing and curation ===
In addition to his work as a musician, Chadburn has written reviews and articles about classical and pop music for The Quietus, Frieze, the New Statesman, and The Wire. He is the curator of the public concert series and the Summer festival at City, University of London.

== Discography ==
=== Albums as Simon Bookish ===
- Unfair / Funfair (2006, Use Your Teeth)
- Trainwreck / Raincheck (2007, Use Your Teeth)
- Everything / Everything (2008, Tomlab)

=== Albums as Leo Chadburn ===
- Epigram / Microgram (2013, Library of Nothing)
- The Subject / The Object (2020, Library of Nothing)
- Slower / Talker (2021, Library of Nothing)
- The Primordial Pieces (2024, Library of Nothing)
- Sleep in the Shadow of the Alternator (2025, Library of Nothing)

== Selected notated works ==
- ANTICLOCK (2019) for ensemble (nine players). Premiered at Cafe OTO, London.
- Five Loops for the Bathyscaphe (2018) for piano trio and recorded voices for the Britten Sinfonia
- Affix Stamp Here (2016) for voices, analogue synthesizers and projections
- Freezywater (2016) for piano, reed organ, strings, percussion and pre-recorded voices
- The Indistinguishables (2014) for string quartet and pre-recorded voices
- Vapour Descriptors (2014) for two pianos
- Brown Leather Sofa (2013) for large orchestra
- X Chairman Maos (2011) for voice and amplified ensemble
