= Ninja High School (band) =

Canadian dance-punk band

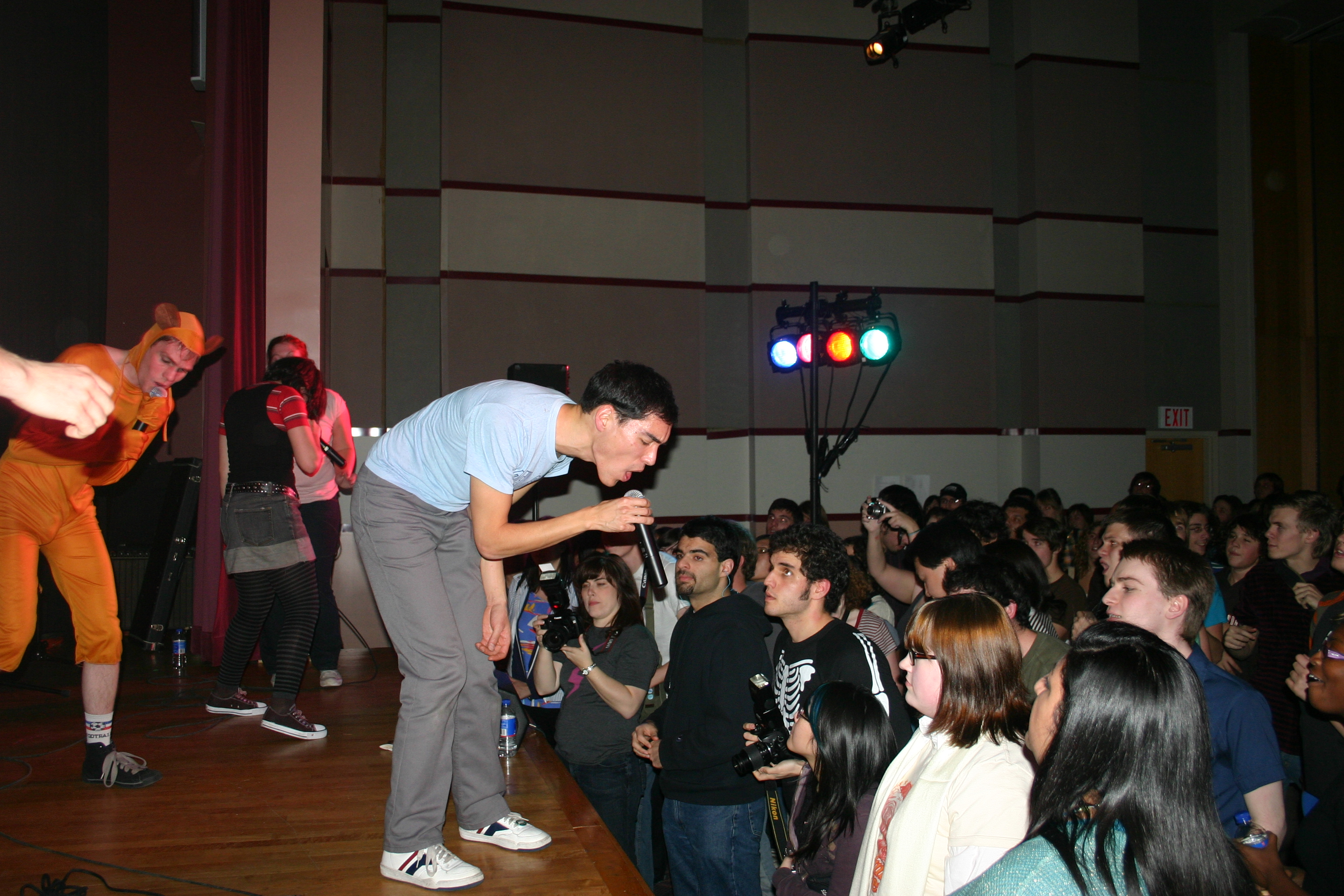
- Ninja High School, November 2006

Background information
- Origin: Guelph, Ontario, Canada
- Genres: Punk rock; dance-punk; hip hop; hardcore punk
- Years active: 2004–2007, 2015
- Past members: Matt Collins, Gregory Collins, Adrian Cvitkovic, Star DT, Whitney Kemble, Catherine Ribeiro, Steve Kado, Wolfgang Nessel
- Website: link

Ninja High School were a Canadian dance-punk band, based in Toronto, Ontario, who merged hip hop and hardcore punk influences. It consisted of Matt Collins, Gregory Collins, Adrian Cvitkovic, Star DT, Whitney Kemble, Catherine Ribeiro, Steve Kado, and Wolfgang Nessel. Craig Dunsmuir of Glissandro 70 has also been associated with the band.

== History ==
The group has its origins at parties in Guelph, Ontario, where frontman Matt Collins rapped while looping samples of James Brown. NHS released an EP and a full-length album on Blocks Recording Club; both releases garnered airplay on CBC Radio 3.

In 2005, the band signed a distribution deal with German record label Tomlab, which also released the two-song "It's All Right to Fight" as part of its Alphabet Series.

They performed their last show in December 2007 at Sneaky Dee's in Toronto.

They performed a one-off "reunion" show at the closing celebration of Blocks Recording Club in May 2015 at Tranzac Club in Toronto.

== Reception ==
The Globe and Mail has referred to the band as "popular theoretical-rap cheer squad Ninja High School". Chart magazine wrote that the album Young Adults Against Suicide "is thoughtful, catchy and, for a lo-fi recording, it sounds awesome" and went on to call "Invasion Party" "hands-down one of the best tracks of the year."

Young Adults Against Suicide reached the top ten of some college and alternative music charts in Canada.

== Discography ==
- We Win! (2004)
- Alphabet Series H 7-inch (2005)
- Young Adults Against Suicide (2005)
- The Terminator Mixtape Cassette (2007)
