= Owen Pallett =

Canadian composer, violinist, keyboardist, and vocalist

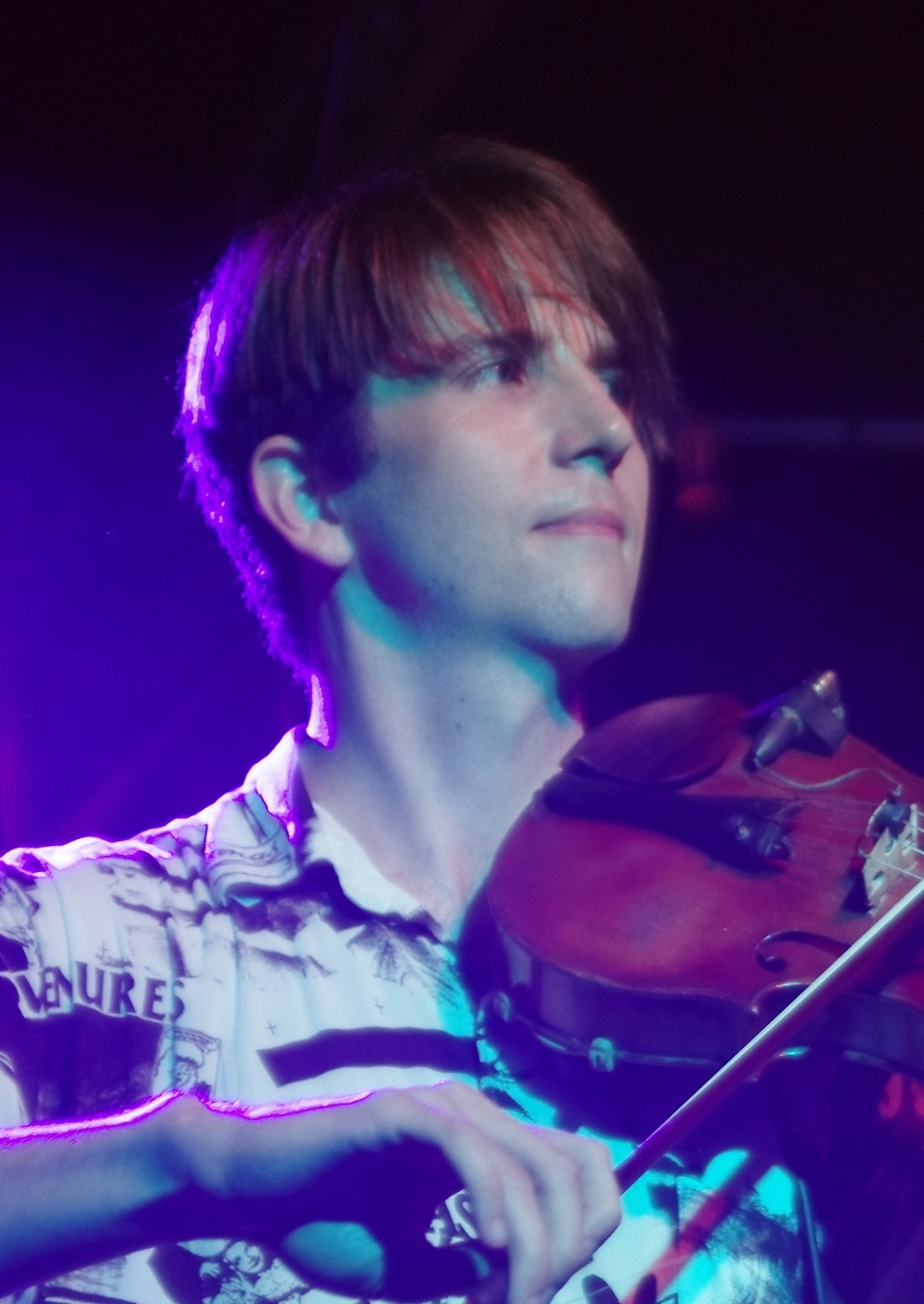
- Pallett performing at Haldern Pop in 2013

Background information
- Born: Michael James Owen Pallett-Plowright; September 7, 1979 (age 47); Mississauga, Ontario, Canada
- Education: University of Toronto (Mus.Bac.)
- Genres: Indie pop; classical; baroque pop; art rock; electronic music
- Occupations: Musician; composer; arranger
- Instruments: Violin; viola; vocals; piano; keyboards; guitar; bass
- Labels: Blocks Recording Club; Tomlab; Domino Recording Company
- Website: owenpalletteternal.com

Owen Pallett (born Michael James Owen Pallett-Plowright, September 7, 1979) is a Canadian composer, violinist, keyboardist, and vocalist. Under their former pseudonym Final Fantasy, Pallett won the 2006 Polaris Music Prize for the album He Poos Clouds. Pallett is also known for their contributions to Arcade Fire, having served as a string arranger and touring member of the band. In January 2014, Pallett and Arcade Fire member William Butler were nominated for Best Original Score at the 86th Academy Awards for their original score of the film Her (2013).

From the age of 3, Pallett studied classical violin, and composed their first piece at age 13. A notable early composition includes some of the music for the game Traffic Department 2192; Pallett moved on to scoring films, to composing two operas while in university. Apart from the indie music scene, Pallett has had commissions from the Barbican, Toronto Symphony Orchestra, National Ballet of Canada, Bang on a Can, Ecstatic Music Festival, the Vancouver CBC Orchestra, and Fine Young Classicals. They have been noted for their live performances, wherein Pallett plays the violin into a loop pedal; Pallett uses Max/MSP and SooperLooper to do multi-phonic looping, which sends their violin signal to amplifiers across the stage.

Aside from their solo oeuvre and work with Arcade Fire, Pallett has contributed arrangements and instrumentation to the works of pop acts like Duran Duran, Pet Shop Boys, Robbie Williams, Taylor Swift and Ed Sheeran, as well as rock performers such as R.E.M., Linkin Park, Franz Ferdinand, the National and Alex Turner.

== Career ==
=== Solo work ===
Pallett has drawn inspiration from electronic act Orchestral Manoeuvres in the Dark (OMD), who were their favourite band, along with Eurythmics. They have also identified albums by Tori Amos, The Strokes, Public Enemy and Brian Eno as influential. Pallett's favorite album is Xiu Xiu's A Promise. The name Final Fantasy, under which Pallett recorded prior to the release of Heartland, was a tribute to the well-known video game series, although Pallett said that it is not one of their top twenty favorite games.

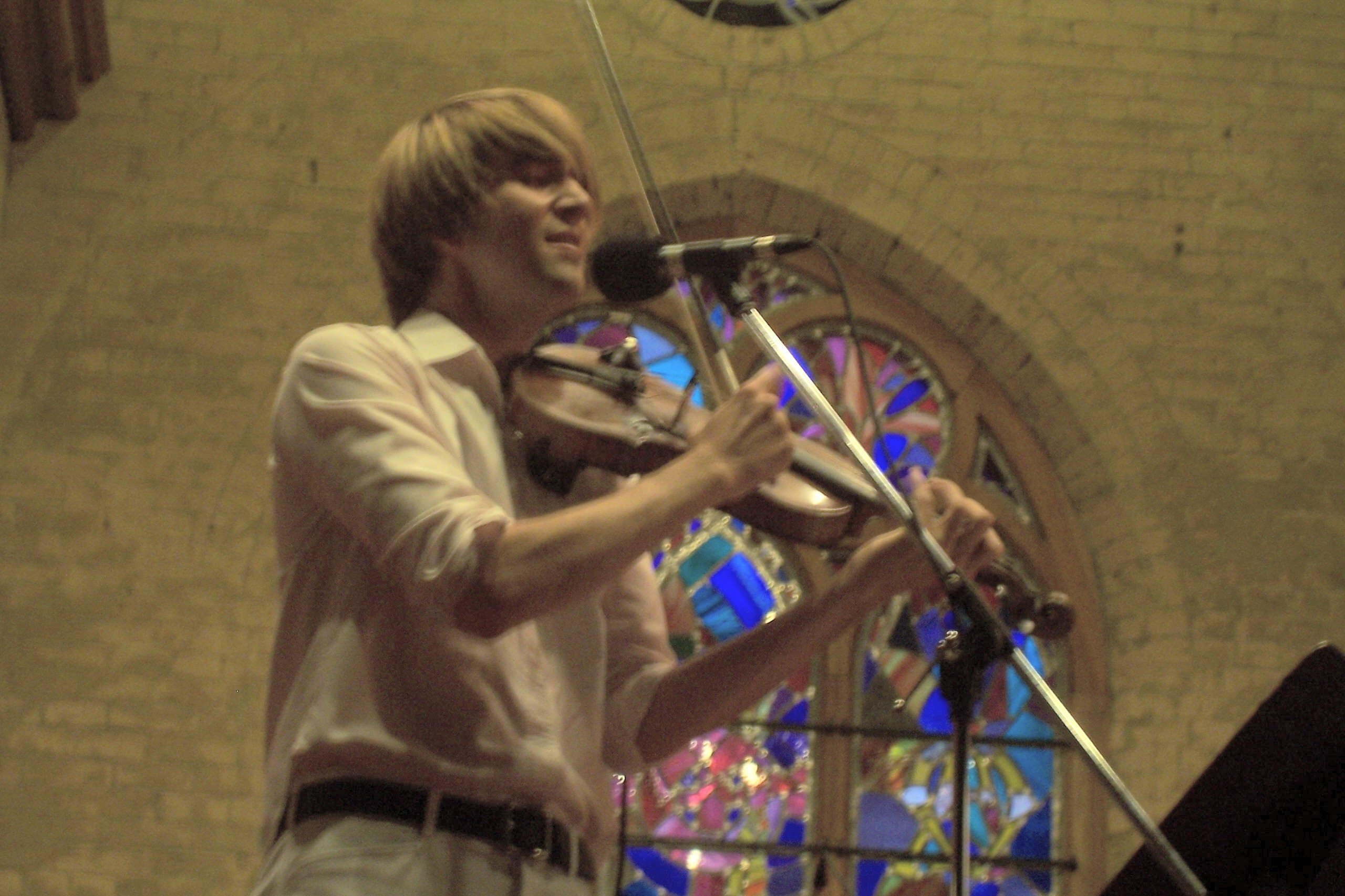
Final Fantasy performing in 2005.

Pallett's debut album, Has a Good Home, was released on February 12, 2005, by the Blocks Recording Club, a cooperative, Toronto-based record label of which Pallett is a founding member. An Arrow in the Side of Final Fantasy borrows the music from the Space Zone's final level in Super Mario Land 2: 6 Golden Coins. "Adventure.exe" from this album was used in a series of 2006 commercials by Orange in the United Kingdom. Pallett did not intend to sell the song for this purpose, but its use was authorized due to an alleged miscommunication with their record label, Tomlab. All of Pallett's income from this use is donated to Doctors Without Borders.

Pallett's second album, He Poos Clouds, was released in June 2006, though the video, directed by Jesse Ewles, was released on March 1, 2006. The album consists entirely of string quartet arrangements. Eight of the ten songs are about each of the schools of magic as described in the rules to the Dungeons & Dragons fantasy role-playing game. The album was named winner of the 2006 Polaris Music Prize. Uncomfortable with receiving a prize sponsored by a mobile phone conglomerate, Pallett gave the money away to bands they liked who needed financial assistance.

In 2007, the song "This Is The Dream of Win & Regine" was used in a commercial for Wiener Stadtwerke without Pallett's permission. Instead of litigation, Pallett and their booking agent Susanne Herrndorf approached the company for sponsorship for a music festival of their curation. The resultant Maximum Black Festival featured Final Fantasy, The Dirty Projectors, Deerhoof, Frog Eyes, Max Tundra, Six Organs of Admittance and others. It played Vienna, Berlin and London.

In July 2007, Pallett was interviewed on the CBC Radio One program Q, about their upcoming album, to be titled Heartland, which was to have a theme of nothingness.

In October 2007, Final Fantasy released a vinyl 7" on Tomlab's Alphabet Single series (The Letter "X"). The two tracks on X, recorded in Montreal with Zach Condon of the band Beirut, predate the album He Poos Clouds. The tracks "Hey Dad" and "What Do You Think Will Happen Next?" are both played regularly at live shows. The song "Hey Dad" contains a melody borrowed from the Nintendo video game "Super Mario Bros. 3"; specifically it is the music from the "Coin Heaven" bonus/hidden stages. Also, the song is quite similar in melody, lyrics and tone to another of Pallett's songs, "→".

In March 2008, Owen Pallett, under the alias Final Fantasy, collaborated with Grizzly Bear's Ed Droste on a cover of Björk's "Possibly Maybe" as part of Stereogum's tribute to Björk's album Post. On their Final Fantasy releases, Pallett has collaborated with Leon Taheny, who is credited as drummer and engineer.

In late 2008, Pallett released two EPs. The first one, Spectrum, 14th Century, was a collaboration with Beirut. The second EP, Plays to Please, was a tribute to fellow Torontonian Alex Lukashevsky and his group Deep Dark United. On it, six Lukashevsky originals were reconfigured for a 35-piece big band, the Toronto-based St. Kitts Orchestra (which includes Drumheller's Nick Fraser, Paul Mathew of the Hidden Cameras, and a whistling Andrew Bird, among others).

In December 2009, Pallett began performing and recording under their own name. The album Heartland was released on Domino Records on January 12, 2010. It was mixed by New York producer Rusty Santos. Also Pallett played Primavera Sound Festival 2010. In August 2010, Pallett released a four track EP entitled A Swedish Love Story on September 28 via Domino. The tracks received substantial airplay on community radio. Following the release of Heartland, Pallett has toured with guitarist/percussionist Thomas Gill and more recently with Rob Gordon and Matt Smith, their former collaborators in Les Mouches.

On November 12, 2012, Pallett tweeted that they had been working on a new album called In Conflict. The album, their fourth full-length recording, was released May 27, 2014.

In live performances, Pallett plays the violin into a loop pedal. Pallett uses Max/MSP and SooperLooper to do multi-phonic looping, which sends their violin signal to amplifiers across the stage.

=== Other contributions ===
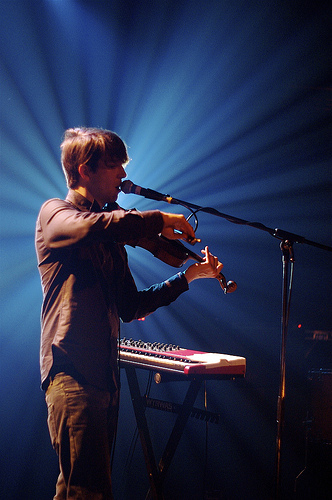
Pallett playing live in Brussels, 2010-03-23.

Pallett's previous projects included a now-defunct three-piece Toronto-based band, Les Mouches. Pallett also played fiddle for a short time with the Celtic rock band Enter the Haggis. Pallett was once the violinist of another Toronto band called Picastro, and briefly played keyboard in SS Cardiacs (with Leon Taheny, Jessie Stein and Michael Small in 2005). Pallett has also recorded and toured with Jim Guthrie, The Hidden Cameras, Royal City, The Vinyl Cafe, Gentleman Reg, and Arcade Fire (they co-wrote the strings arrangement for their albums Funeral and Neon Bible). One of their songs, "This Is the Dream of Win & Regine", was inspired by the principal members of the latter group, Win Butler and Régine Chassagne, and is a play on a Dntel song called, "(This Is) The Dream of Evan and Chan."

Pallett contributed remixes for the bands Stars, Grizzly Bear, and Death from Above 1979. Pallett also wrote string arrangements for the Canadian bands Immaculate Machine, on their 2007 album Fables, and Fucked Up, on their 2006 album Hidden World. Pallett also wrote the string arrangements for the Beirut album The Flying Club Cup, as well as provided vocals for the track "Cliquot". Pallett provided orchestration for The Age of the Understatement, the debut album of the English supergroup The Last Shadow Puppets, formed by co-frontmen Alex Turner (Arctic Monkeys) and Miles Kane (The Rascals). Pallett also conducted the London Metropolitan Orchestra in the recording of this project.

In June 2009, at Luminato, Toronto's annual festival of arts and creativity, Pallett provided part of the live soundtrack for the outdoor screening (at Yonge-Dundas Square, now Sankofa Square) of the 1919 silent German horror film Tales of the Uncanny, alongside Canadian instrumental band Do Make Say Think and German electronica artist Robert Lippok.

In 2009, Pallett worked with Win Butler and Régine Chassagne on the score for Richard Kelly's film The Box. Pallett was also initially set to score Rabbit Hole, a 2010 film by John Cameron Mitchell, but in the end, the film was scored by Anton Sanko.

In 2010, Pallett recorded with Arcade Fire during sessions for their 2010 album The Suburbs, which later received a Grammy Award for Album of the Year. In late 2010, Pallett was named as composer for T Magazine's "Fourteen Actors Acting" project; Pallett received, alongside the producers of that series, an Emmy Award for "New Approaches to News & Documentary Programming: Arts, Lifestyle and Culture".

In 2012, Pallett collaborated with John Darnielle of The Mountain Goats, when several songs from Transcendental Youth were performed in concert with the all-female vocal quartet Anonymous 4 and featured Pallett's arrangements for piano, guitar and voices.

Pallett scored the 2013 film The Wait, directed by M. Blash.

Pallett's string arrangements are featured on the songs "Wear" and "Trust" from the 2021 album Ignorance by The Weather Station.

== Personal life ==
Pallett was born in Mississauga, Ontario and grew up in Milton. Pallett received an Honours Bachelor of Music for Composition from the University of Toronto in 2002. Pallett is gay and gender-queer, and uses gender-neutral pronouns.

== Discography ==
=== With Les Mouches ===
- The Polite Album (CD-R) – 2002
- Blood Orgy!!! (EP) – 2003
- You're Worth More to Me Than 1000 Christians – 2004 (rereleased via Orchid Tapes in 2015)

=== Solo work ===
==== Studio albums ====
- Has a Good Home (as Final Fantasy) – February 12, 2005
- He Poos Clouds (as Final Fantasy) – May 15, 2006
- Heartland – January 11, 2010
- In Conflict – May 27, 2014
- Island - May 22, 2020

==== Soundtrack albums ====
- Spaceship Earth (Original Motion Picture Soundtrack) - May 22, 2020
- Her (Original Score) (with Arcade Fire) - March 19, 2021
- Dream Scenario (Original Score) - November 10, 2023

==== EPs ====
- Young Canadian Mothers (as Final Fantasy) – March 10, 2006
- Spectrum, 14th Century (as Final Fantasy) – September 30, 2008
- Plays to Please (as Final Fantasy) – October 2008
- A Swedish Love Story EP – September 28, 2010

==== Singles ====
- "Many Lives → 49 MP" (as Final Fantasy) – May 29, 2006
- "Alphabet Series: X" (as Final Fantasy) – October 2007
- "Lewis' Dream" (Flora Advert) – February 25, 2008
- "Lewis Takes Action" – January 2010
- "Lewis Takes Off His Shirt" – March 29, 2010
- "Julia/Tiberius" (with Daphni) – April 25, 2014

==== Various songs ====
- "Joys" – appears on Worried Noodles (2007), a compilation of David Shrigley's lyrics set to music.
- "Flare Gun" – appears on #8: SPAM (2007), a compilation released by Esopus.
- "Possibly Maybe" – duet with Ed Droste of Grizzly Bear. Appears on the Stereogum compilation album, Enjoyed (2008), a tribute to Björk's Post.
- "The Donor" – appears on Crayon Angel: A Tribute to the Music of Judee Sill (2009).
- "Red Sun (demo version)" – appears on Friends in Bellwoods II (2009).
- "Hard to Explain" – appears on the Stereogum compilation Stroked (2011), a tribute to The Strokes debut album Is This It.
- "The Phone Call" – appears on ADULT SWIM SINGLES 2015 (2015).
- "Transformer (Guitar Demo)" – appears on the unlimited free milkshakes compilation Art Week 2016 (2016).

=== Other contributions ===
| Year | Artist | Album | Description |
|---|---|---|---|
| 2002 | Jim Guthrie | Morning Noon Night | |
| 2003 | Jim Guthrie | Now, More Than Ever | violins, viola, string arrangements |
| 2003 | The Hidden Cameras | The Smell of Our Own | violin, viola |
| 2004 | The Hidden Cameras | The Arms of His 'Ill' | viola on "Builds the Bone" |
| 2004 | The Hidden Cameras | Mississauga Goddam | violin, piano, celeste |
| 2004 | Arcade Fire | Funeral | violin, string arrangements |
| 2004 | Gentleman Reg | Darby & Joan | string arrangements |
| 2004 | Dan Goldman | Through a Revolution | |
| 2004 | Royal City | Little Heart's Ease | |
| 2004 | Death from Above 1979 | Romance Bloody Romance: Remixes & B-Sides | violin on "Black History Month" |
| 2005 | Picastro | Metal Cares | viola |
| 2005 | Grizzly Bear | Horn of Plenty | "Don't Ask" – Remix |
| 2006 | Grizzly Bear | Yellow House | string arrangements |
| 2006 | Fucked Up | Hidden World | string arrangements |
| 2007 | Arcade Fire | Neon Bible | orchestral arrangements, violin |
| 2007 | C'mon | Bottled Lightning (of an All Time High) | string arrangements |
| 2007 | Great Lake Swimmers | Ongiara | string arrangements |
| 2007 | Beirut | The Flying Club Cup | violin, organ, vocals on "Cliquot", string arrangements |
| 2007 | Immaculate Machine | Immaculate Machine's Fables | violin |
| 2007 | Montag | Going Places | vocals on "Softness, I Forgot Your Name" |
| 2007 | Picastro | Whore Luck | piano on "Hortur", violin and organ on "All Erase" |
| 2007 | Holy Fuck | LP | violin on "Lovely Allen" |
| 2007 | Stars | Do You Trust Your Friends? | "Your Ex-Lover Is Dead" – Remix |
| 2007 | The Phonemes | There's Something We've Been Meaning to Tell You | back-up singing on "Pain Perdu", violin and piano on "Kim Rogers", guitar on "Pine Needles" |
| 2008 | Luxury Pond | Luxury Pond | string quartet arrangements |
| 2008 | The Last Shadow Puppets | The Age of the Understatement | arranged and conducted orchestrations |
| 2009 | The Rumble Strips | Welcome to the Walk Alone | violin, string arrangements |
| 2009 | Pet Shop Boys | Yes | orchestral arrangements |
| 2009 | The Mountain Goats | The Life of the World to Come | violin, string arrangements |
| 2009 | Mika | The Boy Who Knew Too Much | violin on "Rain" |
| 2010 | Arcade Fire | The Suburbs | String arrangements |
| 2010 | Gigi | Maintenant | vocals on "I'll Quit" |
| 2010 | Diamond Rings | "Something Else" single | piano, string arrangements on "Gentleman Who Fell" |
| 2010 | Duran Duran | All You Need Is Now | string arrangements, conductor on "The Man Who Stole a Leopard" |
| 2010 | Mantler | Monody | brass arrangements |
| 2011 | The Luyas | Too Beautiful to Work | strings and string arrangements |
| 2011 | Alex Turner | Submarine soundtrack | string arrangements on "Piledriver Waltz" |
| 2011 | The National | "Exile Vilify" single | strings |
| 2011 | Jim Guthrie | Sword & Sworcery LP: The Ballad of the Space Babies | violin on "The Cloud" |
| 2011 | R.E.M. | Part Lies, Part Heart, Part Truth, Part Garbage 1982–2011 | orchestral arrangements on "We All Go Back to Where We Belong" and "Hallelujah" |
| 2011 | Snow Patrol | Fallen Empires | orchestral arrangements, conductor |
| 2012 | Linkin Park | Living Things | strings on "I'll Be Gone" |
| 2012 | Lindstrøm | De Javu/No Release 12" | "No Release" – Remix (feat. Steve Kado) |
| 2012 | Titus Andronicus | Local Business | violin |
| 2012 | Taylor Swift | Red | orchestral arrangements, conductor on "The Last Time" |
| 2012 | Robbie Williams | Take the Crown | orchestral arrangements on "Candy", "Different" and "Into the Silence" |
| 2012 | Slim Twig | A Hound at the Hem | string arrangements |
| 2013 | The National | Trouble Will Find Me | strings on "I Need My Girl" |
| 2013 | David Lang | Death Speaks | violin |
| 2013 | Light Fires | Face | vocals on "Dependent" |
| 2013 | Franz Ferdinand | Right Thoughts Right Words Right Action | strings & string arrangement on "Stand on the Horizon" |
| 2013 | Arcade Fire | Reflektor | strings & string arrangement |
| 2014 | Marram | Sun Choir | vocals on "With Us Instead" |
| 2014 | Sarah Neufeld | Black Ground EP | arrangement on "Breathing Black Ground (Orchestral Version)" |
| 2014 | Jennifer Castle | Pink City | string arrangements |
| 2014 | Caribou | Our Love | violin, viola |
| 2015 | Titus Andronicus | The Most Lamentable Tragedy | string arrangements, violin, viola |
| 2015 | Majical Cloudz | Are You Alone? | cello, drums, violin |
| 2016 | The Last Shadow Puppets | Everything You've Come to Expect | string and brass arrangements |
| 2016 | Majical Cloudz | Wait And See EP | cello, drums, violin, piano |
| 2016 | Little Scream | Cult Following | string arrangements, violin |
| 2016 | Snowblink | Returning Current | string arrangements, violin, viola |
| 2016 | Ricky Eat Acid | Talk To You Soon | string arrangements, conductor |
| 2016 | Emily Reo | Spell 10" | string arrangements, conductor |
| 2017 | Kirin J. Callinan | Bravado | string arrangements, violin and viola |
| 2017 | Haim | Something to Tell You | string arrangement, violin and viola |
| 2017 | Blue Hawaii | Tenderness | string arrangements, violin and viola |
| 2017 | Charlotte Gainsbourg | Rest | string arrangements, conductor |
| 2017 | Arcade Fire | Everything Now | string arrangements, piano, strings |
| 2017 | Tomberlin | At Weddings | production, mixing, acoustic guitar, synths, vocals |
| 2017 | Frank Ocean | "Provider" | string arrangement, conductor |
| 2018 | Richard Russell | Everything Is Recorded by Richard Russell | string arrangements, violin and viola |
| 2018 | Kimbra | Primal Heart | string arrangements |
| 2018 | Fucked Up | Dose Your Dreams | string arrangements, violin and viola |
| 2019 | The Mountain Goats | In League with Dragons | production, strings arrangements, piano, organ, and guitar |
| 2019 | Banks | III | string arrangements |
| 2019 | Keane | Cause and Effect | brass arrangements |
| 2019 | Odette | "Do You See Me" | string arrangement |
| 2019 | Arcade Fire | Baby Mine | orchestral arrangement |
| 2019 | Superchunk | Acoustic Foolish | string arrangements, violin, viola |
| 2019 | Astrid Swan & Stina Koistinen | Diagnosis | string arrangements, violin, viola |
| 2019 | Daniela Gesundheit | Alphabet Of Wrongdoing | string arrangements, violin, viola |
| 2019 | Vegyn | Only Diamonds Cut Diamonds | string arrangements, violin, viola |
| 2020 | Jack Colwell | "I Will Not Change My Ways" | guitar, string arrangement |
| 2020 | Klô Pelgag | Notre-Dame-des-Sept-Douleurs | string arrangements, violin, viola |
| 2020 | Sean Nicholas Savage | Life Is Crazy | string arrangements, violin, viola |
| 2020 | Pierre Lapointe | Chansons hivernales | orchestral arrangements |
| 2021 | The Weather Station | Ignorance | string arrangements on "Wear" and "Trust" |
| 2021 | Nonconnah | Songs For And About Ghosts | string arrangement, violin, viola |
| 2021 | Kìzis | Tidibàdibe/Turn | string arrangements, violin, viola |
| 2021 | Xiu Xiu | OH NO | vocals on "I Dream of Someone Else Entirely" |
| 2021 | Vegyn | Like A Good Old Friend | string arrangements, violin, viola |
| 2021 | Hannah Georgas | All That Emotion Versions | string arrangement on "Easy", violin, viola |
| 2021 | Wolf Alice | Blue Weekend | string arrangements, violin, viola |
| 2021 | Astrid Swan | D/other | string arrangements, violin, viola |
| 2021 | Vivek Shraya | I'm A Fag For You | remixing |
| 2021 | Model Child | Up From The Bottom | string arrangements, violin, viola |
| 2021 | Parcels | Day/Night | orchestral arrangements |
| 2021 | Wet | Letter Blue | string arrangements |
| 2021 | Lana Del Rey | Blue Banisters | string arrangements, violin, viola |
| 2021 | Ed Sheeran | = | string arrangements, violin, viola |
| 2021 | Taylor Swift | Red (Taylor's Version) | string arrangements |
| 2021 | Basia Bulat | The Garden | string arrangements |
| 2022 | Sharon Van Etten | We've Been Going About This All Wrong | strings on "Born" |
| 2022 | Julia Jacklin | Pre Pleasure | string arrangements on "Ignore Tenderness" and "End of a Friendship" |
| 2022 | Ibeyi | Spell 31 | strings on "Creature" |
| 2022 | Arcade Fire | We | string arrangements, additional recording |
| 2022 | Marit Larsen | "Hva er igjen av oss" | string arrangements |
| 2023 | London Grammar | The Remixes | strings on "Dancing By Night" |
| 2023 | Sampha | Lahai | string arrangements |
| 2023 | Zoon | Bekka Ma'iingan | string arrangements |
| 2023 | Jeremy Dutcher | Motewolonuwok | production, mixing, string and brass arrangements |
| 2023 | Vegyn | "Halo Flip" | strings |
| 2023 | Oscar Lang | Look Now | string arrangements |
| 2023 | Holly Macve ft. Lana Del Rey | "Suburban House" | string arrangement |
| 2023 | Braids | Euphoric Recall | string arrangements |
| 2023 | Matt Holubowski | Like Flowers on a Molten Lawn | string arrangements |
| 2023 | Sharon Van Etten | "Quiet Eyes" | string arrangement, violin, viola |
| 2024 | Nelly Furtado | 7 | string arrangement on "Save Your Breath", additional production on "Untitled" |
| 2024 | Camila Cabello | C,XOXO | string arrangements |
| 2024 | Jennifer Castle | Camelot | string and horn arrangements |
| 2024 | Leif Vollebekk | Revelation | string arrangements |
| 2024 | METZ | Revelation | string arrangement, violin, viola, cello |
| 2024 | Samuel Rosa | Rosa | string arrangements |
| 2025 | Allie X | Happiness Is Going To Get You | string arrangements |
| 2025 | Ambre Ciel | still, there is the sea | string co-arrangement and production |
| 2025 | Cici Arthur | Way Through | string arrangements |
| 2025 | Cloth | Pink Silence | string arrangements, violin, viola, cello |
| 2025 | Cold Specks | Light For The Midnight | string arrangements, violin, viola, cello |
| 2025 | Ezra Furman and Sharon Van Etten | "Feel So Different" | string arrangement |
| 2025 | Lido Pimienta | La Belleza | production, arrangement |
| 2025 | Nick & June | New Year's Face | string arrangements |
| 2025 | Silvana Estrada | Vendrán Suaves Lluvias | string arrangements |
| 2025 | Sorry | Cosplay | string arrangements |

== Selected works ==
- Pallett, Owen (2014). "When I Come Home". In Wilson, Carl (ed.). Let's Talk About Love: Why Other People Have Such Bad Taste. New York: Bloomsbury Academic. pp. 267–269. ISBN 978-1-4411-6677-7.
