= Rusty Santos =

American singer-songwriter

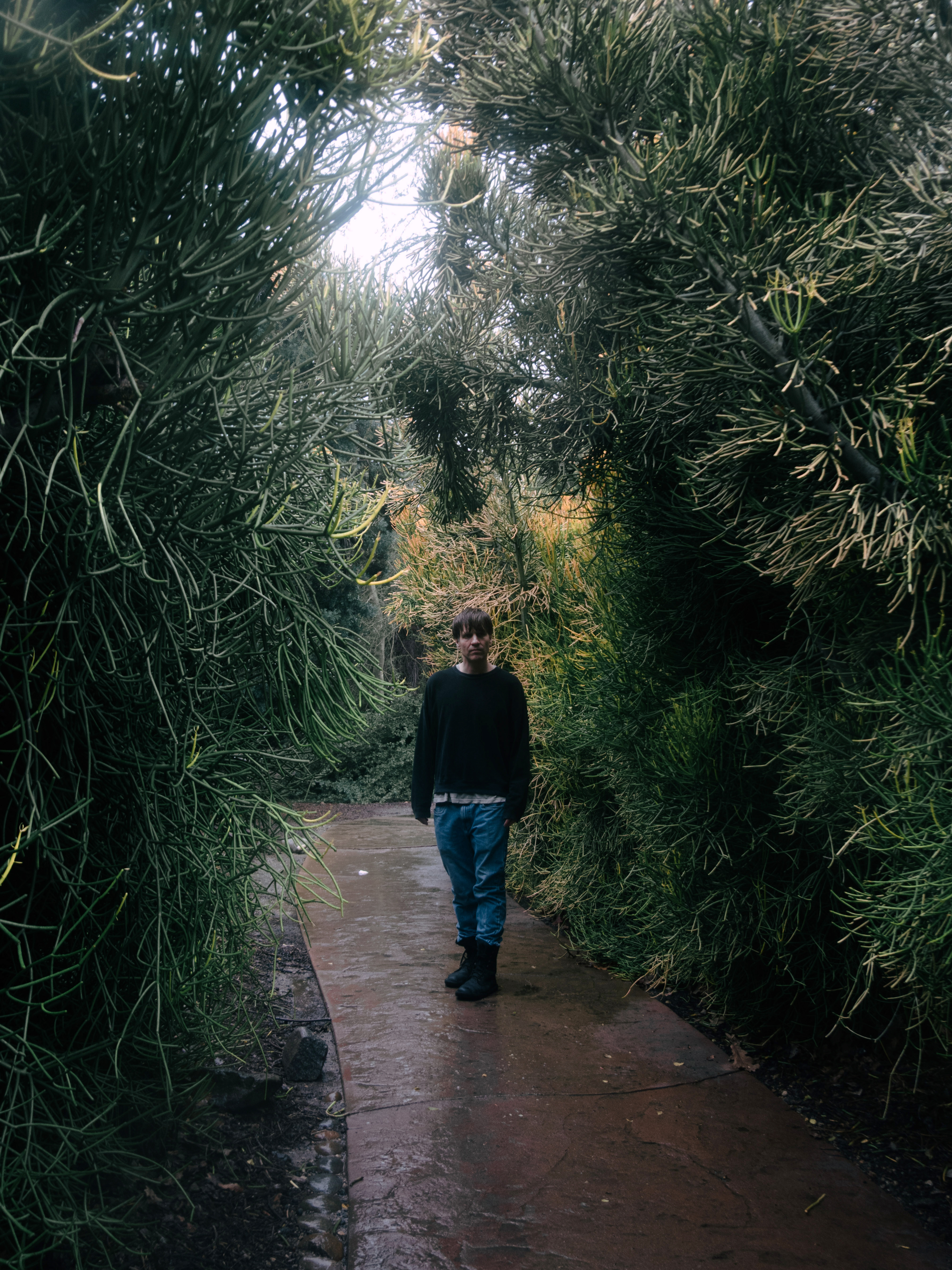
- Santos in 2026

Background information
- Born: August 14, 1979 (age 46)
- Origin: Fresno, California
- Occupations: Record producer, musician
- Instruments: Vocals, guitar, sampler
- Years active: 2002-present
- Labels: UUAR, Easel Records, Lo Recordings,

Rusty Santos is an American record producer and musician based in Los Angeles. He is best known for his production, recording, mixing, and mastering work in indie and experimental pop music, having collaborated closely with Animal Collective and Panda Bear across records including Sung Tongs, Person Pitch, and Buoys. His other credits include mastering Beach House's eponymous debut album, mixing Weyes Blood's The Innocents, recording, producing, and mixing Black Dice's Mod Prog Sic, and mixing Dawn of Midi's Dysnomia.

As a solo musician, Santos combines vocals and guitar with samples. He has released several solo records, with the most recent being 2026's Psycho Horses, and was a member of The Present.

== Early life ==
Rusty Santos was born in Fresno, California, but resided in Nagoya, Japan and attended a local international school until the age of eight. His parents worked as ESL teachers in the city, and it was there when he made his first musical contributions on Utopia, a track on Japanese rock band Lushel's 1986 album Across The Infancy. After returning to Fresno as a teenager, he met drummer Jesse Lee and both played together in punk and hardcore bands from the mid to the late 1990s.

== Career ==
Santos began his career in New York City, where he began recording his own music. There, he made friends with Dave Portner and Noah Lennox of Animal Collective and co-produced the band's breakthrough Sung Tongs to critical acclaim. He also recorded Prospect Hummer, Animal Collective's collaborative EP with British folk singer Vashti Bunyan; the release led to Bunyan's signing with FatCat Records and recording Lookaftering, her first album of new material since 1970. Santos issued his official debut, The Heavens, in 2004. Released on United Acoustic Recordings (UUAR), the album was co-produced with Dave Portner. His second studio album, Eternity Spans, features a guest appearance by Momus, whose album Ocky Milk Santos produced the initial Berlin sessions earlier in the year.

In the summer of 2007, Santos began a recording project with Mina Ohashi, professionally known as Fayray, which led to Santos, Ohashi, and Lee founding the band The Present in April 2008. They released their debut, World I See, in June of the same year on Lo Recordings and the Japanese label Easel Records. According to Santos, the album was written and recorded entirely in a stream-of-consciousness style. The Present toured the UK and Europe in late 2008 and the summer of 2009, before releasing their sophomore effort The Way We Are that same year, with the group becoming a duo. In 2010, they shifted towards dance music influenced by Chicago house, ghetto house, juke, and footwork, releasing a collaboration with DJ Rashad in early 2013. In 2015, they released the album FSG on Group Tightener Records followed by the EP Break the Dawn on Styles Upon Styles.

From 2015 to 2019, Santos worked internationally. In Beijing, he produced the band Chui Wan's albums The Landscape the Tropics Never Had and EYE for Maybe Mars Records, and mixed the self-titled album by Nova Heart. In Lisbon, he met the artist Dino d'Santiago and, with Seiji, co-wrote and co-produced the song "Nôs Funaná" for his first album on Sony Portugal. In Mexico City, he met the artist LIZZ and co-produced her debut single "Embalao" with Sebastián Sartor for Aftercluv/UMLE. He also co-produced Jackie Mendoza's EP LuvHZ. In 2018, Santos reunited with Noah Lennox, recording and co-producing the Panda Bear album Buoys for Domino Records. This was followed in 2019 with the single "Playing the Long Game", produced by Santos, Lennox, and Sartor.

In 2022, Santos released the album High Reality and New Wave In California the following year, which included collaborations with Panda Bear and Jackie Mendoza. In February 2026, he released the solo album Psycho Horses and supported it with a run of shows across the southwestern United States.

== Discography ==
=== Solo ===
- Bad Is Good (2002, self-released)
- Outside versus In (2003, self-released)
- The Heavens (2004, UUAR)
- A Up High/Beloved Below (2005, UUAR)
- Eternity Spans (2006, UUAR)
- High Reality (2022, Lo Recordings)
- New Wave In California (2023, self-released)
- Psycho Horses (2026, self-released)

=== The Present ===
- World I See (2008, Lo Recordings, Easel Records)
- The Way We Are (2009, Lo Recordings)
- FSG (2015, Group Tightener Records)
- Break the Dawn (2017, Styles Upon Styles)
