= Brad J. Lamb =

Canadian real estate broker

Brad J. Lamb is a Canadian real estate broker and condominium developer. He had a reality television show named Big City Broker on the HGTV Canada network for several years. The show focused on the workings of his real estate brokerage, "Brad J. Lamb Realty Inc." Lamb received media attention in March 2021. Due to a zoning bylaw violation, tenants living in units above an auto-body repair shop were forced to leave their units permanently by the City of Toronto.

== Early life ==
Lamb was born in Vancouver, British Columbia, Canada. His father was an Air Canada pilot and his mother a registered nurse. In 1967, the family moved to Montreal, where they settled in the Beaconsfield neighbourhood. Lamb attended Queen's University, where he obtained a degree in engineering. Lamb purchased his first property in London, Ontario in 1984. Early on, Lamb noted how much his real estate agent was earning on his property deals. A few years after his graduation, bored with his engineering sales position, he obtained his real estate license.

== Real estate career ==
Lamb went to work for Harry Stinson's real estate company in 1988 and became a specialist in selling condominiums in central Toronto. He quickly became Stinson's top agent, making $250,000 in his first year.

In 1995, he left Stinson to start his own firm, Brad J. Lamb Realty. In 2001, Lamb founded Lamb Development Corporation. It specializes in high style condominium projects, such as Flatiron Lofts, Worklofts, Glas, Parc, King Charlotte, Gotham Ottawa, The Harlowe, Theatre Park and Brant Park. The company has spread beyond Toronto to build and develop structures in Ottawa, Montreal, Calgary, Edmonton and Hamilton. Despite the boutique-style size, his agency became one of the most prominent sellers of condominiums in Toronto. In 2007, at the height of the property boom, his company's agents sold some 2,000 condos worth over $800 million. When the market slowed in 2008, the firm still moved about $525 million in real estate. According to Lamb's website, his agents have sold over 22,000 condominiums for over $8 billion as of 2016.

Lamb is known for his billboards, particularly a 2007 series of ads that depicted a lamb with Lamb's head and the slogan "This Lamb Sells Condos." He has become "a household name in Toronto" and is often featured in the media as a real estate expert.

In 2017, William Shatner accused Lamb of using Shatner's name and caricature likeness in his brochures to sell real estate.

In March 2022, Lamb announced his plans for his King Street West building. These plans included a demolition of the current property to make way for a new 17 story tower featuring 714 sq. m of retail space on the ground floor, and two to three bedroom units above, However, city staff recommended the property for a heritage designation.

== Controversies ==
=== Wellington House ===
In 2017, Lamb applied to obtain approval at the city level to build a 23-storey building behind two 19-century heritage homes at 422-424 Wellington St. W. in downtown Toronto, a project that was originally marketed as Wellington House. The proposed project required rezoning approval from the City of Toronto, but negotiations for those rule changes broke down, forcing the cancellation of units in the building in 2018. On March 23, 2020, Wellington House partially caught on fire amid the COVID-19 pandemic. Police say that at least one small explosion took place inside the abandoned semi-detached houses. Only two days later, the same building caught fire once again.

=== Pre-Construction condominiums and cancellations ===
Besides Wellington House, Lamb cancelled Jasper House condo project in Edmonton in 2017. Early in 2018, Lamb cancelled the James condo at 452 Richmond St. W. due to a re-zoning issue. In 2019, it was announced that Lamb's development of Television City in Hamilton is delayed to 2025. In the same year, another project from Lamb Development Corp. in downtown Toronto was cancelled.

=== 1407-1409 Bloor Street West ===
In 2021, several tenants were forced by the City of Toronto to evacuate a Lamb-owned property located along Bloor Street West. The reason for their eviction by the City of Toronto was due to the violation of a zoning bylaw. They were living in units only deemed for commercial use. On March 26, after a brief negotiation, Brad Lamb and the tenants came to a collective agreement and shared a statement via their social media channels.
