= Dawn of Midi =

American band

Dawn of Midi is an American acoustic ensemble from Brooklyn, New York. The group is composed of bassist Aakaash Israni, pianist Amino Belyamani and drummer Qasim Naqvi. The group formed in 2007 in Los Angeles but have resided in Brooklyn since 2011.

The group's second album, Dysnomia (written by Belyamani and Israni), was released in 2013.

In 2013, the podcast Radiolab released a short on the group entitled "Dawn of Midi" that included an interview with Israni. This short was later re-used as the opening of the 2016 full length Radiolab episode "Man vs. Machine" and again in the 2025 episode "Music Hat".

In 2016, the English rock band Radiohead announced Dawn of Midi as their opener for two sold-out concerts at New York's Madison Square Garden as part of the group's "A Moon Shaped Pool" tour.

== Discography ==
- First (Accretions, 2010)
- Live (self-released, 2011)
- Dysnomia (Thirsty Ear Recordings, 2013, Erased Tapes Records, 2015)

== General references ==
- , The New Yorker
- , BBC Radio 3
- Concert Review, The New York Times
- Review, All About Jazz
