= Blocks Recording Club =

- Founded: 2003-2015
- Founder: Steve Kado; Mark McLean
- Genre: Indie
- Country of origin: Canada
- Location: Toronto, Ontario
- Official website: blocksblocksblocks.com

Blocks Recording Club was a Canadian co-operative of musicians, which served as both a collaborative artist community and a record label for its member artists.

The label's name may also be cited graphically as □□□□□□ rather than the word "Blocks". Although this is in fact the label's official name, the word "Blocks" is used where it is not typographically possible to use the graphical series of blocks.

== History ==
The □□□□□□ Recording Club was founded by Steve Kado and Mark McLean in 2003 as a tapes and mini-cd only label. Shortly afterward, McLean left for Ottawa. Steve Kado ran □□□□□□ with Liisa K. Graham until 2005 when the club incorporated as a worker's co-operative.

Since then the club has been run by an elected board of directors. The first board of directors was James Anderson, Steve Kado and Matt McDonough. The second board comprised Katarina Gligorijevic, Bob Wiseman, John Caffery & Brian Joseph Davis. Blocks' current board of directors is, Magali Meagher, Matt Smith and Patrick Borjal.

In 2009, NME included the Blocks Recording Club in its annual Future 50 list.

Blocks ceased operations in 2015 with a final concert at the Tranzac Club with performances by Austra, Bob Wiseman, Barcelona Pavilion, Nifty, Les Mouches, the Phonemes, Hank, Matias, and Ninja High School with DJ's Maya Postepski (of Austra) and John Caffrey (Kids on TV).

== Artist roster ==
Artists who have released material through Blocks include Final Fantasy, Fucked Up, Bob Wiseman, Katie Stelmanis, Barcelona Pavilion, The Phonemes, Les Mouches, Ninja High School, The Blankket, Hank, PDF Format (the Band), Kids on TV, SS Cardiacs and The Creeping Nobodies.

Final Fantasy's second album on Blocks, He Poos Clouds, was named the winner of the inaugural Polaris Music Prize in 2006. Owen Pallett, the artist behind the Final Fantasy project, announced that he would donate a portion of his prize money to the label to help other artists.

== See also ==
- List of record labels
