= Michael Peter Olsen =

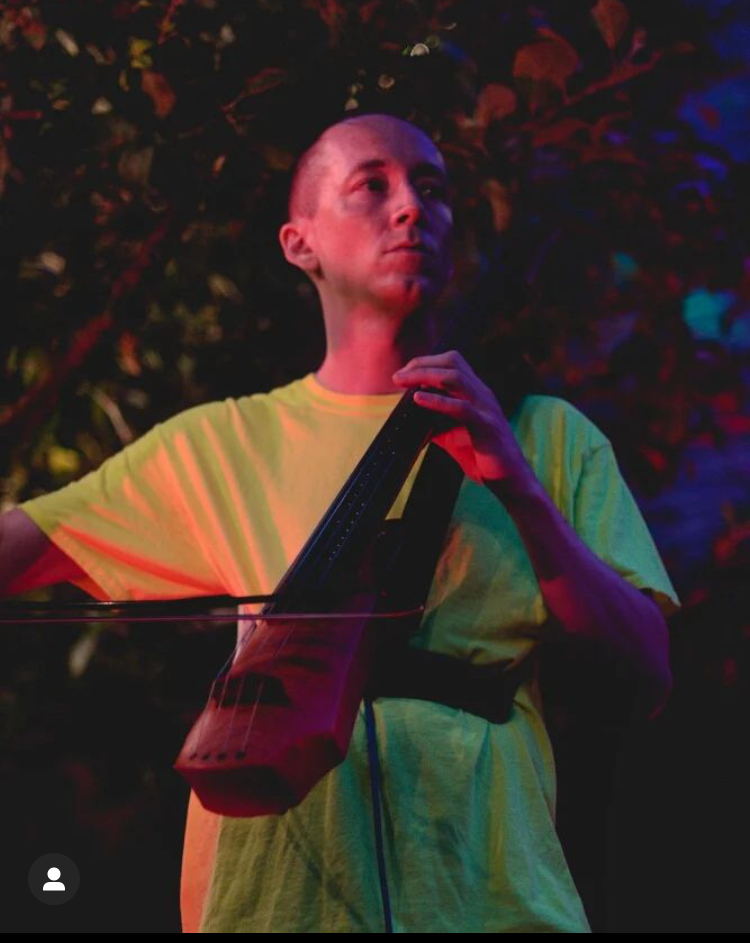
Michael Peter Olsen performing with Zoon in Toronto August 2021

Michael Peter Olsen (born June 28, 1974) is a Grammy-nominated multi-instrumentalist, producer, engineer, composer and arranger currently based in Toronto, Ontario.

Olsen has collaborated live on tour and on records with bands and artists such as Arcade Fire, Drake, K-OS, Jim Guthrie, Kevin Hearn, The Constantines, Gentleman Reg, Great Lake Swimmers, The Hidden Cameras, and Zoon.

He is also well known as a producer and has worked with Ohbijou, and Spiral Beach. Olsen was a founder and operator of the Toronto recording studio Uncomfortable Silence.

Olsen currently fronts the Toronto band Our Founders, whose members include Spencer Cole of Weaves. Their album The Nines was released in October 2013.

He was a Canadian Film Centre Slaight Music Lab Resident from 2014 to 2015 in Toronto.

As a solo artist, Olsen released a full-length record titled Yearning Flow in the spring of 2021 on the Canadian independent label Hand Drawn Dracula.

== Selected performance discography ==
=== Drake ===
- Views (2016)

=== Our Founders ===
- The Nines (2013)

=== The Great Lake Swimmers ===
- Ongiara (2007)
- Lost Channels (2009)

=== Arcade Fire ===
- Funeral (2004)
- Cold Wind (2005)
- Dark Was the Night (2009)

=== Hidden Cameras ===
- The Hidden Cameras Play the CBC Sessions (2002)
- The Smell of Our Own (2003)
- A Miracle (2003)
- Mississauga Goddam (2004)
- Awoo (2006)
- Origin:Orphan (2009)

=== K-os ===
- Joyful Rebellion (2004)

=== Jim Guthrie ===
- Now, More Than Ever (2003)
- Morning Noon Night (2003)

== Selected production discography ==
=== Ohbijou ===
- Swift Feet for Troubling Times (2006), Producer/Engineer

=== Spiral Beach ===
- Ball (Sparks/EMI, 2007), Co-Producer/Engineer
- The Bonus Disc (Sparks/EMI, 2008), Producer/Engineer
- The Only Really Thing (Sparks/EMI, 2009), Producer/Engineer

=== The Organ ===
- The Organ (Mint Records/604, 2008), Mix Engineer
