= The Smell of Our Own =

Studio album by the Hidden Cameras
- Released: April 15, 2003
- Recorded: 2003
- Genre: Indie rock
- Length: 42:40
- Label: Rough Trade Records, EvilEvil
- Producer: Joel Gibb and Andy Magoffin

The Hidden Cameras chronology
Ecce Homo (2001)	The Smell of Our Own (2003)	The CBC Sessions (2003)

Professional ratings
Aggregate scores
Source	Rating
Metacritic	84/100
Review scores
Source	Rating
AllMusic	3.5/5 stars
Alternative Press	4/5
Blender	4/5 stars
Drowned in Sound	10/10
Entertainment Weekly	A−
Mojo	4/5 stars
Pitchfork	8.1/10
Q	4/5 stars
Stylus Magazine	A
Uncut	3/5 stars

The Smell of Our Own is a 2003 album by the Hidden Cameras.

== Track listing ==
1. "Golden Streams" – 4:28
2. "Ban Marriage" – 4:15
3. "A Miracle" – 2:50
4. "The Animals of Prey" – 4:04
5. "Smells Like Happiness" – 3:08
6. "Day Is Dawning" – 5:06
7. "Boys of Melody" – 4:59
8. "Shame" – 5:28
9. "Breathe on It" – 2:52
10. "The Man That I Am with My Man" – 4:37

=== Bonus tracks on Japanese edition ===
11. "Heavy Flow of Evil" – 2:55
12. "The Dying Galatian" – 2:22

=== Bonus tracks on 2023 Reissue ===
11. "Ode To Self-Publishing (Fear Of 'Zine Failure)" – 3:24
12. "Boys Of Melody (CBC Session)" – 4:51
13. "Smells Like Happiness (4-Track Demo)" – 3:12
14. "Shame (CBC Session)" – 5:25
15. "Day is Dawning (CBC Session)" – 4:47
16. "The Dying Galatian" – 2:22
17. "Heavy Flow Of Evil" – 2:54
18. "Ban Marriage (4-Track Demo)" – 5:02
19. "Breathe On It (CBC Session)" – 2:51
20. "A Miracle (4-Track Demo)" – 2:43

== Personnel ==
- Joel Gibb – producer, mixing, artwork, vocals, guitars, bass, piano, pipe organ, glockenspiel, vibraphone, sleigh bells, cymbals, marimba, timpani, tambourine, clapping
- Gunter Kravis – photography
- Graham Hollings – saxophone
- Andy Magoffin – producer, mixing, trumpet, clapping
- Magali Meagher – drums
- Kristen Moss – harp
- Mike Olsen – cello
- Owen Pallett – violin, viola
- Matias Rozenberg – timpanis, cymbals, drums, bass, bass synth keys, mandolin, trombone, vibraphone
- Justin Stayshyn – Hammond organ, pipe organ, piano
- Bob Wiseman – piano
- Choir: Karen Azoulay, October Brown, Linda Bush, Janis Demkiw, Mike e.b., Liz Forsberg, Brenda Goldstein, Paige Gratland, Graham Hollings, Luis Jacob, G.B. Jones, Samara Liu, Judy MacDonald, Maggie MacDonald, Magali Meagher, Mez, Roy Mitchell, Jenny Orenda, Paul P., Owen Pallett, Kristy Simpson, Justin Stashyn, Karen Turner, Lex Vaughn, Reg Vermue
