= Sneaky Dee's =

Restaurant and concert venue in Toronto, Canada

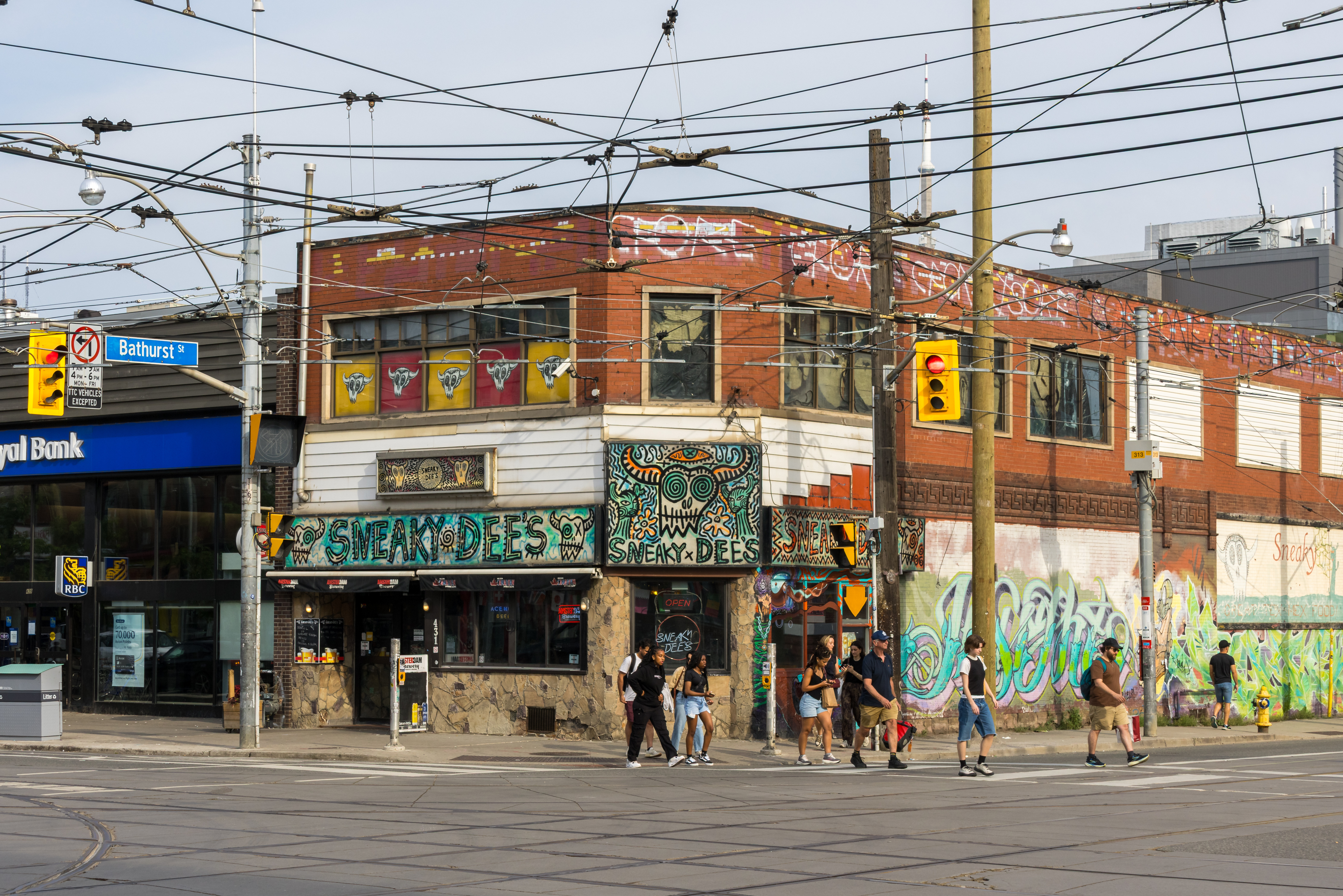
- Sneaky Dee's in 2026
- Interactive map of Sneaky Dee's
- Address: 431 College Street
- Location: Toronto, Ontario, Canada
- Coordinates: 43.656295°N 79.407431°W
- Type: Restaurant and concert venue
- Events: Alternative rock, indie rock

Construction
- Opened: 1987

Sneaky Dee's is a concert venue and Tex-Mex restaurant in Toronto, Ontario, Canada. Originally opened in 1987 near the north west corner of Bloor Street and Bathurst, it moved to its present location at College and Bathurst in 1990.

== History ==
=== 562 Bloor West ===
Sneaky Dee's opened as a 24-hour restaurant at 562 Bloor Street, three doors from the corner of Bathurst on the north side in 1987. The basement contained a performance venue, which hosted the first Toronto Fringe Festival in 1989.

=== 431 College ===
It moved to its current location at 431 College Street in 1990 and became a major venue for Canadian punk rock, hosting Armed and Hammered and other bands. In the early 1990s, Sneaky Dee's was a popular destination for anti-fascist and Anti-Racist Action (ARA) activists, and was the scene of a 1993 brawl between activists and the neo-Nazi Heritage Front after the vandalizing of a white supremacist's house in the east end. After briefly hosting DJs exclusively in the late 1990s, Sneaky Dee's returned to hosting live music in 2002.

Sneaky Dee's is noted as a major venue for alternative culture and indie rock in Toronto. The venue hosted the long-running Wavelength Music Arts Projects and the Trampoline Hall Lecture Series, until both series moved to The Garrison in October 2009.

Since 2011, local bands and artists have been invited to create signature dishes, including City and Colour's "Northern Blues Nachos", Cancer Bats' "The Destroyer", Sparrows' "Fifth Helena Homefries", Lights' "Cactus in The Valley Nachos", Death From Above 1979's "DFA Nachos", and Fucked Up's two breakfast dishes "The Queen of Heart Attacks" and "Fucked Up Breakfast".

In September 2020, a proposal was submitted to the city of Toronto to demolish Sneaky Dee's and its surrounding buildings to construct a 13-story mixed-use condominium. Toronto city councillor Mike Layton voiced his opposition to the proposal, noting that Sneaky Dee's is "an iconic site and it would really be sad to see them go." Progress on this proposal stalled and operation resumed in the short term.

In May 2026, renewed concern emerged regarding the future of Sneaky Dee’s following reports of a revised condominium redevelopment proposal for the site at the corner of College Street and Bathurst Street. The proposal, which followed earlier redevelopment plans first submitted in 2020, sparked renewed public debate surrounding the preservation of Toronto’s independent music venues and cultural landmarks amid continued urban intensification. In July 2026, the proposal was withdrawn after the Royal Bank of Canada, which operates a retail bank next to Sneaky Dee's objected to the plan on the basis that it still legally owned the parcel of land for its bank that the developers incorrectly claimed to own on the application.

In July 2026, Toronto City Councillor Dianne Saxe announced her intention to put forward a motion to designate building as a heritage site in order to protect it from future redevelopment plans.

== In popular culture ==
Toronto rock band Lowest of the Low mention Sneaky Dee's (lyrics below) in the song “That Song About Trees & Kites” off their Hallucigenia album.

“Well, I don’t mean to be a preacher/ And give a sermon from the church of Sneaky Dee’s/ But one more jug of beer and that point that I was reaching/ Will hit me like a vision and make me fall on my knees.”

Sneaky Dee's was featured in the Scott Pilgrim series of graphic novels written by Bryan Lee O'Malley.

Sneaky Dee's was mentioned by chef and TV host Anthony Bourdain in the second season of The Layover, part of an episode profiling top spots to eat, drink and experience in Toronto.

== Artists who have played at Sneaky Dee's ==
=== International artists ===
- A Place to Bury Strangers
- Agent Orange
- Akron/Family
- Cattle Decapitation
- Dan Deacon
- Dirty Projectors
- Guttermouth
- Health
- Jay Reatard
- King Kong
- Laughing Hyenas
- Pansy Division
- Patrick Wolf
- Pissed Jeans
- Supergrass
- Surfer Blood
- Unsane
- Wavves
- Xiu Xiu

=== Canadian artists ===
- AIDS Wolf
- Arcade Fire
- Barcelona Pavilion
- Born Ruffians
- Broken Social Scene
- Cancer Bats
- Comeback Kid
- The Diodes
- Feist
- The Flatliners
- The Glorious Sons
- Gob
- Images in Vogue
- Japandroids
- Kids on TV
- Living With Lions
- Meligrove Band
- METZ
- Moist
- Nihilist Spasm Band
- Owen Pallett
- Pup
- Real Zombies Never Die
- Republic of Safety
- Rusty
- The Sadies
- SS Cardiacs
- The Tea Party
- Tokyo Police Club
- Zumpano
- Glow Veins
