= Alphalpha =

Alphalpha may refer to:

- Alfalfa, alternative spelling
- Alphalpha Male, a music project of Don Kerr and Kevin Lacroix
