= Monkeybird =

Monkeybird, monkey-bird or monkey bird may refer to:

- Various birds which are attracted to feeding monkeys:
  - White-crested hornbill (Tropicanus albocristatus)
  - Yellow-billed malkoha (Phaenicophaeus calyorhynchus)
  - Greater racket-tailed drongo (Dicrurus paradiseus)
- Monkey bird, a fictional creature in the animated fantasy series The Pirates of Dark Water
- "Monkeybird", a song on the album The Story of Harmelodia by Rheostatics
- The Pink Monkey Birds, backing band for American guitarist Kid Congo Powers
- Slang term for the receiving partner in male-on-male anal sex, included in the lyrics to "Moonage Daydream" by David Bowie
