= Luis Jacob =

Luis Jacob (born 1971) is a Canadian artist, writer, curator and educator living in Toronto, Ontario, Canada.

== Life and work ==
Jacob was born in Lima, Peru and moved to Canada with his family when he was ten. He graduated from the University of Toronto in 1996.

Exhibitions of his work include "LTTR Explosion: Practice More Failure" (Art in General, New York City); "Towards a Theory" (Het Wilde Weten, Rotterdam); "Tomorrow’s News" (Gallery Hippolyte, Helsinki); "Better Worlds" (Agnes Etherington Art Centre, Kingston); "Art is Activism" (Fine Arts Building Gallery, University of Alberta, Edmonton); "Voices in Transit" (Cape Town Central Station, Cape Town South Africa); "House Guests: Contemporary Art at the Grange" (Art Gallery of Ontario, Toronto). Anarchist Art Today, Station Art Gallery (Houston); Curb Appeal, Confederation Centre Art Gallery (Charlottetown); Open Your Mouth and Your Mind Will Follow, travelling to Articule, (Montreal), Artspace Gallery (Peterborough), AKA Gallery (Saskatoon), and The New Gallery (Calgary);

Luis was curator-in-residence at Blackwood Gallery, University of Toronto at Mississauga, where he curated the exhibitions "My Rolodex: Janice Gurney, Chris Lloyd, Sandy Plotnikoff" and "Golden Streams: Artists©ˆ Collaboration and Exchange in the 1970s". He is also involved in the community-education collective, the Anarchist Free University in Toronto.

For a period of time, Luis was a member of The Hidden Cameras, and appeared on the albums The Smell of Our Own and Mississauga Goddam, and created artwork for the EP the arms of his 'ill'.

In 1999, Jacob created and produced a limited edition (500 copies) project called 'Without Persons remix CD'. His original audio track 'Without Persons' was recorded and then given to various producers to remix and were all on the CD. Artists including Peaches, Greek Buck, Navigator (Simon Cowling), Aria, The Dot Wiggen Strings (Sandro Perri and Todd Fox), Pausenfuller, Brandon Labelle and Frank Rynne. A CD release and live performance event was held in Toronto when released.

In 2007 he participated in documenta 12.

In March 2010 Jacob's piece, Album IV, was shown at the Guggenheim Museum as part of Haunted: Contemporary Photography/Video/Performance .

== Literature ==
Henry Keazor, `The Stuff You May Have Missed´: Art, Film and Metareference in The Simpsons, in: The Metareferential Turn in Contemporary Arts and Media. Forms, Functions, Attempts at Explanation, hrsg. von Werner Wolf in Zusammenarbeit mit Katharina Bantleon und Jeff Thoss, Amsterdam/New York 2011, p. 463 - 490 (shows Jacob´s reference to "The Simpsons" in his work "Album III" at the documenta 12)
