= Bob Wiseman =

Canadian composer and author (born 1962)

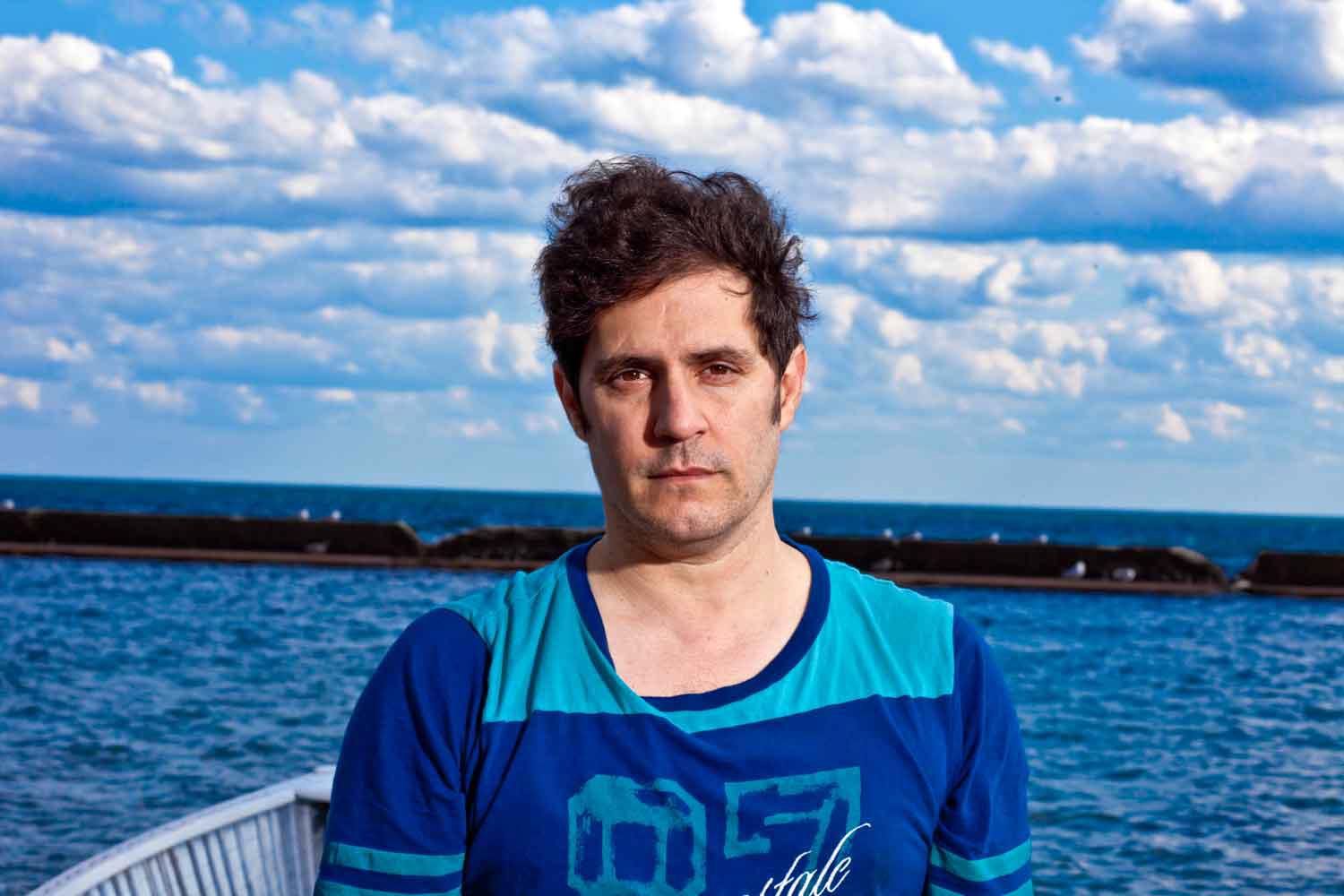
- Bob Wiseman

Background information
- Born: 1962 (age 63–64); Winnipeg, Manitoba, Canada
- Origin: Toronto, Ontario, Canada
- Genres: Rock, country rock, jazz rock, folk rock, improvisational
- Occupations: Musician, songwriter, producer, filmmaker, actor
- Instruments: Piano, keyboard, guitar, accordion, vocals
- Years active: 1984–present
- Formerly of: Hidden Cameras, Blue Rodeo, Dick Duck & The Dorks, Slutarded
- Website: bobwiseman.ca

Robert Neil Wiseman (born 1962) is a film composer, songwriter, author and music teacher. Wiseman discovered or produced many artists including Ron Sexsmith, The Lowest of the Low, Bruce McCulloch of Kids in the Hall, Anhai, and former Canadian member of parliament Andrew Cash. He is a founding member of Blue Rodeo with whom he won 5 Juno Awards.

== Career ==
In the 1980s, Wiseman played at open stages in Toronto, where he started producing friends Bob Snider, Kyp Harness, Ron Sexsmith, Sahara Spracklin, and Sam Larkin. He joined Blue Rodeo in 1984 and quit in 1992 to follow a solo career.

Wiseman's songs often incorporate new musical elements and explicit political themes. Guest contributors on his 13 albums include Daniel Lanois, Mary Margaret O'Hara, Eugene Chadbourne, Edie Brickell, Ron Sexsmith, Jane Siberry, Basia Bulat, and Serena Ryder.

In 2009, a 20th anniversary edition of In Her Dream was released by the Blocks Recording Club and the songs were performed live by various friends including Ron Sexsmith, Geoff Berner, Owen Pallett, Kyp Harness, The Phonemes, Picastro, Michael Holt, Maggie MacDonald, UIC, Henri Faberge, and Don Christensen. In 2006, Wiseman and his partner, Magali Meagher, were accompaniment for Daniel Johnston. Wiseman was also a member of Slutarded, Black Eyes, The Hidden Cameras, and Dick Duck & the Dorks.

Some of his better known songs include "White Dress" – a song about sexual assault, recorded by Serena Ryder, "What the Astronaut Noticed and Then Suggested" which was the theme song for the CBC Television series Material World, and the theme song to CBC radio's Someone Knows Something.

== Touring and theatre ==
In 2009, Wiseman created Actionable, a PowerPoint presentation utilizing Super 8, video and live accompaniment on accordion and guitar which he presented in 2010 at the Uno Festival in Victoria, as well as Fringe Festival circuits.

Wiseman collaborated theatrically with Scott Thompson of The Kids in the Hall, creating and touring Scottastrophe, also with Anand Rajaram on award-winning Cowboys and Indians, and with Sean Dixon for Barbara Gowdy's story The White Bone adaptation, with The Madawaska String Quartet and with Maggie MacDonald and Stephanie Markowitz writing the music for their play The Rat King.

Wiseman toured with Feist, Final Fantasy, Ron Sexsmith, and Scott Thompson and was a guest performer with Wilco, The Wallflowers, Eugene Chadbourne, Jimmy Carl Black (of Frank Zappa), Edie Brickell, Michelle Wright, Ashley MacIsaac & Garland Jeffries. Videos on YouTube of Wiseman songs performed with Feist ("You Don't Love Me"), Serena Ryder ("White Dress") Sexsmith ("All The Trees)".

Artists who covered Wiseman's songs include The Madawaska String Quartet, UIC, Leah Abramson, The Bourbon Tabernacle Choir, Michael Holt, Change of Heart, Magali Meagher, Tom St. Louis, Ben Bootsma, and The Blind Venetians.

Wiseman makes super 8 films and videos that he accompanies live on accordion, guitar or piano. He tours/ performs with these films in Europe, United States, New Zealand, and Canada, subtitling them when necessary. Wiseman is the only live musician on John Oswald's 1988 release Plunderphonics. He was on the board of directors for LIFT, TAIS, The Tranzac & the Blocks Recording Club label in Toronto. In 2019, he obtained his master's degree in Environmental Studies from York University and currently is in the PhD program at the International Institute for Critical Studies in Improvisation.

== Production ==
Wiseman began producing records in the 1980s. His debut, Wet Water, charted at number four on CKLN-FM at Ryerson Polytechnical Institute. He also arranged and recorded for other artists, such as Ron Sexsmith and Kyp Harness. The record he produced for Sexsmith, Grand Opera Lane (1986), was rejected by Canadian A&R representatives, though it was eventually picked up by Geffen Records. Other notable clients were Bruce McCulloch, with whom Wiseman produced and co-wrote Shame-Based Man in 1995. Other artists Wiseman has produced include Edie Brickell, Andrew Cash, Carmaig de Forest, Robert Priest, Anhai, Friendly Rich, Katie Crown, Bourbon Tabernacle Choir, Eugene Chadbourne, and Bob Snider.

== Author ==
- July 2023, Improv notes Issue on Andy Newmark Counting to Seventeen.
- June 2022, Improv notes Issue on Coleman Hughes goes to Washington.
- April 2022, Improv notes Issue on Fred Stone (musician) Musical Phenomenologist.
- April 2021, Improv notes Issue on the Tranzac and Covid.
- July 2020, ECW Press Music Lessons 350 pages.

=== Radio scores ===
- Julie Bindel podcast theme (2024)
- Someone Knows Something (2016)

=== Film scores ===
- Polish (2023) by Eytan Millstone and Dan Bricker
- Temperance (2022) by Scott Thompson
- Rasputin (2018) by Jamie Shannon
- The Drawer Boy (2017) by Arturo Pérez Torres and Aviva Armour-Ostroff
- Idiots In Love (2016) by Kathleen Phillips-Locke
- Meat Pie (2015) by Eytan Millstone
- Political Refugee (2015) by Rob Stefaniuk
- The Education of William Bowman (2015) by Ken Finkleman
- Blood White (2015) by Rotter and Kess
- Micah Lexier, Visual Artist (2015) by Min Sook Lee
- Love Song for the Apocalypse (2014) by David Ridgen
- Every Story Has a Twist (2014) by Bindu Shah
- Mugshot (2014) by Dennis Mohr
- Safir (2013) by Mariam Zaidi
- David Noble: A Wrench In The Gears (2013) by Jon Bullick
- Candy (2013) by Cassandra Cronenberg
- The Ghosts In Our Machine (2013) by Liz Marshall
- What's Art Got To Do With It? (2013) by Isabel Fryzsberg
- The Thunder Bird & The Killer Whale (2012) by Caroline Trudell
- Even If My Hands Were Full of Truths (2012) by Franci Duran
- Sad Wet Happy Dry (2011) by Levi MacDougall
- The Old Ways (2011) by Mike Vass
- That Thing That Happened (2010) by Josh Saltzman and Lindsay Ames
- The Pickles Shane (2009) by Levi MacDougall
- Sous l'oeil du temps (2009) by Madi Pillar
- Drawing from Life (2008) by Katerina Cizek
- Abstract (2007) by Steve Whitehouse
- Heart Mission (2005) by Katie Crown
- Scarlett's Room (2004) by Yvonne Ng
- The Racist Brick (2003) by Dave Derewlany and Adam Brodie
- Toraanisqatsi (2001) by Leif Harmsen
- Thirst (2000) by Jessica Joy Wise
- American Whiskey Bar (1996) by Bruce McDonald
- Coleslaw Warehouse (1994) by Bruce McCulloch

=== Television scores ===
- Food Stories (2023) for Guelph Television
- Derby (2016) for Bravo
- Guidance (2013) for BiteTV
- Carolina Dai (2011) for RAI
- The Distractions (2003) for The Comedy Network
- Loving Spoonful (1998–2006) for WTN network & Canadian Broadcasting Corporation
- Twitch City (1996–1999) Bruce McDonald (director) and Don McKellar
- Spiritual Literacy (1998) for VisionTV
- Pet Project (1995–1998) for Animal Planet
- Wildside (1993–1994) for Nickelodeon
- Material World (1992) for Canadian Broadcasting Corporation

=== Theatre scores ===
- Charming Monsters (2013) directed by Aaron Rothermund
- Smother (2012) directed by Omar Joseph Hady
- Actionable (2011) directed by Sean Dixon
- Cowboys and Indians (2008) directed by Anand Rajaram
- The White Bone (2007) directed by Sean Dixon
- The Rat King (2006) directed by Maggie MacDonald and Steph Markowitz
- Hys Unauthorized Lyfe and Tymes (2002) directed by Anand Rajaram
- The 3 Penny Epic Cabaret (1994) directed by Adam Nashman
- Peter Cottontail (1969) directed by Mrs. Smith

== Production discography ==
=== Selected releases ===
- Bob Wiseman Sings Wrench Tuttle: In Her Dream (1989, Atlantic Records). The album created some notoriety when the first thousand copies were destroyed by Warner Music due to the song "Rock and Tree" which was feared libelous. It was about the murder of Salvador Allende and mentioned Richard Nixon, Henry Kissinger and Donald M. Kendall, the president of Pepsi Cola. "Wrench Tuttle", the credited lyricist, was a Wiseman pseudonym. (Wiseman claimed that he set music to words by Tuttle, a poet who would send him lyrics in the mail.) The album was included in the Canadian music critics top 100 albums of all time The album yielded the video "We Got Time", with cameos by Mendelson Joe and friends, Tracy Wright (for whom Wiseman wrote the 2013 song mothfaceyahoo.ca), Don McKellar, Leslie Spit Treeo and Mary Margaret O'Hara. The album also featured "Airplane on the Highway" which had an accompanying video by Caroline Azar and animator Lisa Bujoin.
- Hits of the 60s and the 70s (1990, self released) recording of piano improvisations that contained no hits from the 60s or70s.
- Presented by Lake Michigan Soda (1991, Warner Music Canada). Guests included Edie Brickell, Jane Siberry and Eugene Chadbourne with whom he recorded Chopin's etude Opus 10 No. 6 retitling it opus 10 No. 666 with Chadbourne on distorted electric rake introducing himself as "Oighan Chadbornitsky of the Budapest Philharmonic". The song "What the Astronaught Noticed and Then Suggested" became the theme song for the CBC Television sitcom Material World produced by The Kids in the Hall's Susan Cavan. Three videos were filmed for PBLMS. "The Man From Glad" was directed by Yvonne Ng (artistic director of Princess Productions) shot by Nicholas de Pencier with costars including Keith Cole. "Frost in Florida", about global warming, was directed by Andrea Nann and shot by de Pencier. "Taylor Field", about adolescent suicide, was directed by Howard Wiseman.
- City of Wood (1993, Warner Music Canada and Glitterhouse Records in Europe)
- Beware of Bob (1994, Sabre Touque Records in Canada and FU Stephano in Italy) – instrumental album.
- Accidentally Acquired Beliefs (1995, Warner Music Canada). It was recorded at Metalworks Studios in Mississauga, Ontario.
- More Work Songs from the Planet of the Apes (1997, God Finds Cats). Jean Smith praised it for the song Libelous about activists David Morris and Helen Steel (see McLibel case).
- It's True (2004, Blocks Recording Club)
- Theme and Variations (2006, Blocks Recording Club). Top 10 of 2006 Toronto's Now Magazine.
- The Legend (2008, Blocks Recording Club), a live recording from Halifax.
- Giulietta Masina at the Oscars Crying (2013, Blocks Recording Club (vinyl), God Finds Cats (CD)). Songs about police murders, Robert Dziekanski taser incident, and political leaders. Guests include Mary Margaret O'Hara, Maylee Todd, Serena Ryder, Mark Hundevad, Michael Keith and Michael Holt.

=== Production ===
- Wiseman Sessions (1988) UIC
- Outside The Law (1989) Basic English
- Sam Larkin (1989) Sam Larkin
- Grand Opera Lane (1990) Ron Sexsmith
- Put Your Head on Your Shoulders (1990) The Bourbon Tabernacle Choir
- Nowhere Fast (1991) Kyp Harness
- You (1991) Bob Snider
- Love Song to the Alien (1992) The Liz Band
- Shaylee (1992) Edie Brickell
- Hi (1992) Andrew Cash
- Just Buy It (1992) Furnaceface
- Gamble/ Motel 6 (1993) Lowest of the Low
- Ruins of Our Own (1993) Eugene Chadbourne
- Shame-Based Man (1995) Bruce McCulloch
- California (1996) Jeanette Froncz
- Spacewoman (1998) Selina Martin
- We Need A New F Word (2005) Friendly Rich
- Gamma Knife (2011) Maria Kasstan
- Apology (2011) Eihpos Grapes
- Countdown (2011) Stacey McLeod
- Arachnia (2011) Sean Dixon
- New Boots (2011) Laska Sawade
- Catholic School (2011) Christine Cleary
- Love You More (2011) Kwesi Immanuel
- Three of Swords (2013) Mimi Osvath
- The Nightjar and The Garden (2014) Jess Reimer
- The Secret Songs of Sam Larkin (2015) Sam Larkin
- Tomorrow Is Today (2018) Anhai
- Love is Hard (2022) Robert Priest

=== Solo discography ===
- Wet Water (1984)
- In Her Dream: Bob Wiseman Sings Wrench Tuttle (1989)
- Hits of the Sixties and Seventies (1990)
- Presented by Lake Michigan Soda (1991)
- City of Wood (1993)
- Beware of Bob (1994)
- Accidentally Acquired Beliefs (1995)
- More Work Songs from the Planet of the Apes (1997)
- It's True (2004)
- Theme and Variations (2006)
- The Legend (2008)
- In Her Dream (2009) – 20th anniversary edition on vinyl with previously unreleased tracks
- Giulietta Masina At The Oscars Crying (2013)

== Film and videography ==
A retrospective of his films and videos were shown in 2010 both in Kuopio, Finland and in Genoa, Italy at the Associazione Culturale Disorderdrama.

- Alexander and the Hydro Pole (1999)
- All Dressed Up (2001)
- Bhopal (driftnet plan) (2003)
- My Cousin Dave (2003)
- Uranium (2004)
- Drum Sounds (2005)
- Bob And Choice (2006)with Scott Thompson, Levi MacDougall and Nathan Fielder
- Found Poetry (2006)
- 100 Instruments (2007)
- Dead Inside (2007)
- Who Am I (2008)
- Ten Cent Job (2009)
- Response of a Lakota Woman to FBI Intimidation (2009)
- Disappearing Trick (2009)
- Hand Language (2010)
- You Don't Love Me (2010)
- Three Men (2011)
- Two (2011)
- Neil Young at the Junos (2013)
- Misery (2016)
- MothfaceYahoo.ca (2017)
- The Reform Part at Burning Man (2019)

== Personal life ==
Wiseman attended Joseph Wolinsky Collegiate, École River Heights, Grant Park, Argyle Alternative High School in Winnipeg, Manitoba, and holds a Masters of Environmental Studies from York University. He obtained his PhD in 2026 from the International Institute for Critical Studies in Improvisation.

== Awards ==
- 5 Juno Awards won with Blue Rodeo
- Juno nomination Most Promising Male Vocalist
- Gemini Award Nomination 2000 for Twitch City music
- Lifetime achievement award winner from CBC Radio 3
- Presented with the Key to Bruno, Saskatchewan by the Mayor in 2008
- Best Songwriter 2013 Now Readers Poll (runner up)
- 2015 Dan Galea 4th Wiseman Music of Sound Award
- 2017 Favourite cover of Exclaim! 25th anniversary issue.
