= The Lollipop Generation =

- Directed by: G. B. Jones
- Written by: G. B. Jones
- Produced by: G. B. Jones
- Starring: Jena von Brücker, Mark Ewert, Jane Danger, Vaginal Davis, Calvin Johnson, Jen Smith, Joel Gibb
- Cinematography: G. B. Jones
- Edited by: G. B. Jones
- Music by: The Hidden Cameras, Bunny and the Lakers, Anonymous Boy and the Abominations, Jane Danger, Swishin' Duds, Mariae Nascenti
- Distributed by: V Tape
- Release date: April 3, 2008
- Running time: 70 minutes
- Country: Canada
- Language: English

The Lollipop Generation is a 2008 Canadian underground experimental film written, produced, and directed by G. B. Jones, whose previous films include The Troublemakers and The Yo-Yo Gang. It premiered as the Gala Feature presentation of the Images Festival in Toronto on April 3, 2008.

Starring Jena von Brücker, the film tells the story of Georgie, a teenager who is forced to run away from home after coming out to her parents, and the homeless queer youth and other people she meets on the streets.

== Synopsis ==
G. B. Jones’ The Lollipop Generation is a film about runaway queer kids, a gang of lollipop-eating social misfits let loose on the streets of Toronto. They stumble into drugs, danger, and prostitution, and inhabit an underground culture infused with a pervasive yet innocent kind of sleaze. Seasoned with a bottom-up punk aesthetic and a good handful of homemade porn, the film presents an altogether refreshing critique of the stultifying norms of convention.

== Cast ==
- Jena von Brücker as Georgie
- Mark Ewert as Rufus
- Jane Danger as Janie
- KC Klass as Peanut
- Vaginal Davis as Beulah Blacktress
- Calvin Johnson as Playground pervert
- Joel Gibb as Retardo
- Jen Smith as Redheaded hopscotch girl
- Johnny Noxzema as Porn director
- Mitchell Watkins as Porn star
- Rachel Pepper as Rich girl (Peanut's trick)
- Torry Colichio as Metro Theatre girl
- Becky Palov as Blonde hopscotch girl
- DD Donato as Peanut's boyfriend
- Andrew Cecil as Skateboarding streetkid in washroom
- Paul P. as Washroom boy
- Scott Treleaven as Washroom boy
- Christy Cameron as Girl in store
- Gary Fembot as New wave hustler
- Ian Philips as Hustler
- Kevin Constrictor as Hustler
- Stevec as Hustler
- Helen Bed as Shop owner
- Clitoris Turner as Shop clerk
- Rick Castro as Photographer
- Ronster as Dumpster diver
- G. B. Jones as Doorway denizen

== Production ==
The film was made over a period of 15 years, "one Super-8 reel at a time", whenever the director could afford to buy another cartridge of film. In the end, the Toronto band Kids on TV organized a benefit so that G.B. Jones could finish it.

When asked if the film belonged to the "queer experimental" genre, G. B. Jones replied, "No, no, no. I mean, I think some people don't really get what we're doing, so they try to stick a label on us, to try to define and limit us. Some people call it experimental film, some people call it documentary filmmaking, other people call it “New Queer Cinema.” But we're going beyond the borders they're trying to impose on us. It is an experiment."

=== Filming ===
The film was shot on location across Canada and the United States, and features scenes at sites that have since been demolished, such as the Metro Theatre; Riverdale Hospital by architects Howard Chapman and Len Hurst; Adventure playground in Toronto; and Retail Slut in Los Angeles, California.

== Reception ==
The Lollipop Generation was described by the Buenos Aires International Festival of Independent Cinema as, "...a trip through epileptic shots of documentary ugliness that go right to the origins and essence of sexually anarchic cinema...". However, Peter Keough of The Boston Phoenix insists, "There's a fine line between the trash of early John Waters and just plain garbage. G.B. Jones, perhaps to her credit, ignores it completely." Using Canadian pop culture reference points, Toronto's Eye Weekly called it, "Scrappy as hell, yet often charming, it's a lost Degrassi High episode remade as an amateur porn flick and sometimes as sweet as all that candy."

Time Out described the film as serving "a diaristic function, documenting the people the director has met and the cities she travelled to, capturing an entire generation of underground performers." The 23rd Annual London L & G Film Festival catalogue says, "Shot on Super 8 and video, The Lollipop Generation harnesses these tools of the traditional home movie and uses them to make a fucked up family film."
