= Shame-Based Man =

Studio album by Bruce McCulloch
- Released: April 11, 1995
- Recorded: at Metalworks Studios in Mississauga, Ontario
- Genre: Comedy
- Length: 50:42
- Label: Atlantic
- Producer: Bob Wiseman

Bruce McCulloch chronology
Shame-Based Man (1995)	Drunk Baby Project (2002)

Professional ratings
Review scores
Source	Rating
Allmusic	4.5/5 stars

Shame-Based Man, released on April 11, 1995, was the first album by the comedian Bruce McCulloch. Produced and arranged by Bob Wiseman It has 20 tracks of McCulloch's comedic music.

== Track listing ==
1. "Grade 8" (Bruce McCulloch, Bob Wiseman, Brian Connelly) – 2:59
2. "Stalking" (McCulloch, Wiseman) – 2:11
3. "Al Miller" (McCulloch, Connelly) – 2:30
4. "Heroin Pig" (McCulloch) – 0:41
5. "40 Housewives" (McCulloch, Connelly) – 2:38
6. "Doors" (McCulloch, Kevin McDonald, Wiseman) – 3:44
7. "Acid Radio" (McCulloch) – 1:03
8. "Lift Me Up" (McCulloch, Wiseman) – 3:35
9. "Our Love" (McCulloch, Wiseman) – 2:34
10. "Not Happy" (McCulloch, Connelly) – 4:17
11. "Answering Machine" (McCulloch, Connelly) – 3:10
12. "Daddy's on the Drink" (McCulloch, Wiseman) – 3:10
13. "He Said, She Said" (McCulloch, Wiseman) – 1:28
14. "Daves I Know" (McCulloch) – 2:21
15. "That's America" (McCulloch, Connelly) – 2:33
16. "Baby Jesus (Radio)" (McCulloch) – 1:02
17. "Eraserhead" (McCulloch, Wiseman, Hugh Phillips, Don Kerr, Connelly) – 3:11
18. "Vigil" (McCulloch, Wiseman) – 4:08
19. "When You're Fat" (McCulloch, Wiseman) – 2:16
20. "Lonely People" (McCulloch) – 1:11

== Personnel ==
- Bruce McCulloch - Vocals, mixer
- Bob Wiseman - Producer, Arranger, Keyboards, Accordion, Additional Vocals & mixing
- L. Stu Young - Engineer, mixer
- Brian Connelly - Guitar, mixer
- Hugh Phillips - Bass, additional vocals
- Don Kerr - Drums, additional vocals
- George Koller - Cello
- Colin Couch - Tuba
- Sarah MaCelcheran - Trumpet
- Steve Donald - Trombone
- Don Rooke - Lap Steel
- Shannon McGaw - Additional Vocals
- Tamara Gorski - Additional Vocals
- Don Frank - Additional Vocals
