= The Hidden Cameras Play the CBC Sessions =

EP by the Hidden Cameras
- Released: 2004
- Genre: Indie Pop
- Label: Rough Trade Records
- Producer: Joel Gibb

The Hidden Cameras chronology
The Smell of Our Own (2003)	The Hidden Cameras Play the CBC Sessions (2004)	Mississauga Goddam (2004)

The Hidden Cameras Play the CBC Sessions is a limited edition EP by the Hidden Cameras, released in 2004 on Rough Trade Records.

The EP collects live tracks that the band recorded for broadcast on CBC Radio in March 2002.

== Track listing ==
1. "Worms Cannot Swim Nor Can They Walk" (3:14)
2. "Music is My Boyfriend" (3:19)
3. "Boys of Melody" (4:47)
4. "Breathe on It" (2:48)
5. "Day is Dawning" (4:43)
6. "Shame" (5:25)
