= Spiral Beach =

Canadian indie rock band (2003–2009)

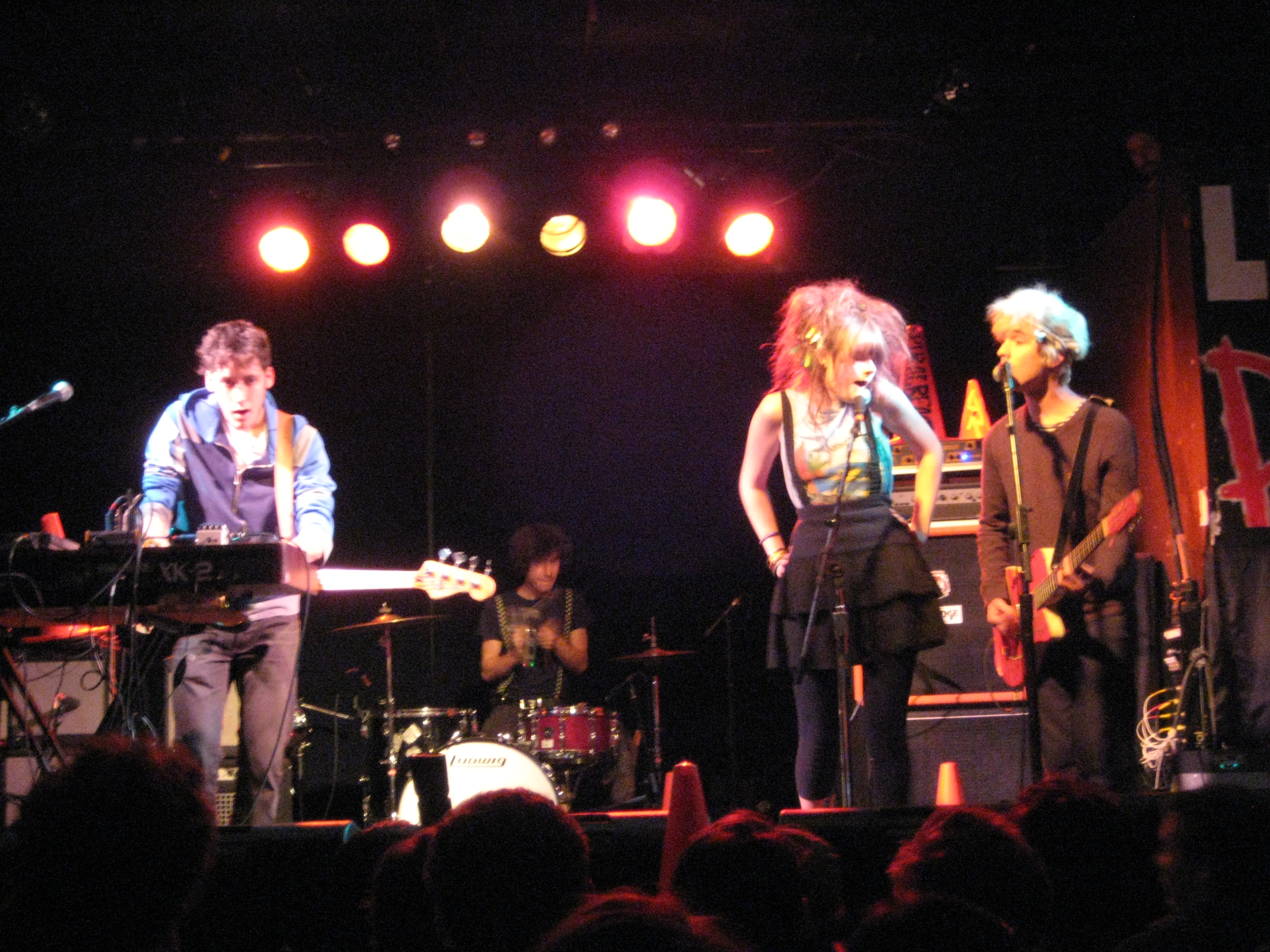
- Spiral Beach performing in Toronto, October 2009

Background information
- Origin: Toronto, Ontario, Canada
- Genres: Indie rock Ghoul Punk; Experimental Rock
- Years active: 2003–2009
- Label: Sparks Music
- Past members: Airick Woodhead; Maddy Wilde; Dorian Wolf; Daniel Woodhead
- Website: spiralbeach.com

Spiral Beach was a Canadian indie rock band, formed in Toronto, active from 2003 to 2009. The group consisted of vocalist and guitarist Airick Woodhead, vocalist and keyboardist Maddy Wilde, bassist Dorian Wolf, and drummer Daniel Woodhead.

== History ==
In 2005, the quartet released their self-titled EP and performed locally all over Toronto, including a weekly residency at Toronto's Drake Hotel. By June 2006, the band had gained a devoted following and their shows began selling out, with their NXNE showcase ranked as one of the best of the festival. While their self-titled EP began receiving airplay on Canadian campus radio stations and CBC Radio 3, the band embarked on an international concert tour opening for The Hidden Cameras. This was followed by dates opening for Tokyo Police Club and Sloan.

Spiral Beach released their debut album, Ball, on Sparks Music on October 16, 2007. It was produced by Mike Olsen of The Hidden Cameras, and recorded in a converted barn near Hamilton, Ontario. To celebrate the album's release, the band organized several concerts in Toronto including an all-ages show on Ward's Island which drew hundreds of people to what the band describes as a "rave"-style event, as well as filming a music video for the song "Made of Stone" in a circus tent set up in Trinity Bellwoods Park. They toured around Canada to support the album and performed at SXSW in Austin, Texas the following year.

In April 2008, Spiral Beach played overseas in London, England, to coincide with the release of the Voodoo UK 7". The shows were well received and included a show at Club Fandango. The band was also featuring on the home page of MySpace UK.

In June 2008, the band was fined $1,470 by EcoMedia for postering on their large metal recycling bins in Toronto, prompting a benefit show at the Whippersnapper Gallery, one of Toronto's most popular DIY all-ages venues.

In December 2008, the band began work on their second album with producer Mike Olsen. After the initial recording process was complete, they embarked on a North American tour.

In June 2009, Spiral Beach played four shows at the NXNE Festival in Toronto, including performances with Matt & Kim, Japanther, DD/MM/YYYY, and The Black Lips. The shows were filmed for a music video to the song "Domino" from their forthcoming album. Chartattack rated the band's performance at Yonge & Dundas Square as one of the best of the festival.

The album The Only Really Thing was released on September 22, 2009, and the band embarked on another North American tour, including several shows at the CMJ Music Marathon in New York City, where they were featured as one of the "Top Ten Bands at CMJ" by Paste magazine. Along with traditional vinyl, CD, and mp3 formats, the album was also released as a 95-page photo book, a copy of Daniel Woodhead's original lyric book, and a comic book by Maddy Wilde. After several acoustic shows in Toronto that fall, they left for a European tour in November 2009, which included a headlining show with fellow Canadians Hey Rosetta at the Queen of Hoxton in London, in a night presented by Muso's Guide, as well as a performance at the On3Radio Festival in Munich, Germany, broadcast live on-air to thousands of viewers.

Upon the band's return, they performed on MTV Live for the second time. The band performed their final show in Toronto on Daniel's birthday, December 19, 2009.

Airick and Daniel Woodhead are the sons of Canadian folk musician David Woodhead, and Wilde is the daughter of Canadian musical satirist Nancy White.

The members of Spiral Beach appear as themselves in the film Charlie Bartlett, with four of their songs featured in the movie. They have also had their video "Made of Stone" used as part of an episode of the television series Life's a Zoo.

Airick Woodhead is currently performing under the alias Doldrums, while Dorian Wolf is a core member of the group Austra. In 2011, Daniel Woodhead announced a new project under the name Moon King, a duo with Maddy Wilde. All the members continue to collaborate and make music together.

== Performance style ==
The band is known for their energetic and visually entertaining performances, which often feature pylons, video projections, and wild stage antics. They have expressed their preference for performing at all ages shows in unusual venues and situations, including galleries, theaters, loft spaces and downtown parks. They also tend to perform barefoot or shoeless.

A press release for the band's 2007 show at the Centre of Gravity Theatre in Toronto read:

"A massive all night party at the Centre of Gravity Theatre featuring the finest musical acts from Toronto and abroad, as well as a full-on extravaganza of video projections, gravity-defying circus acts and glow-in-the-dark visuals. This event will not officially end, and guests are encouraged to bring tents, sleeping bags and pillows and camp out on the floor with the bands. A pancake breakfast will be served in the morning."

== Festival appearances ==
Spiral Beach has performed at a number of music festivals including

- Blue Skies Festival (2005)
- Hillside Music Festival (2006 and 2008, including a guest appearance by Cadence Weapon) in Guelph
- Ottawa Bluesfest (2007)
- Wolfe Island Music Festival (2007)
- The Big Time Out in Cumberland, British Columbia (2007)
- Ottawa Folk Festival (2008)
- SCENE Fest (2008 and 2009) in St. Catharines
- Suncrash Festival (2008 and 2009) in Orillia
- V Fest (2008) in Toronto
- On3Radio Festival in Munich, Germany (2009)

== Discography ==
- Spiral Beach (independent, 2005) (out of print)
- Ball (Sparks Music, 2007)
- Voodoo UK 7"(Relentless/Stimulus, 2008)
- Bonus EP (Sparks Music, 2008)
- The Only Really Thing (Sparks Music, 2009)
