= The Nightlines Sessions =

Live album by Rheostatics
- Released: 1998
- Genre: Indie rock

Rheostatics chronology
Double Live (1997)	The Nightlines Sessions (1998)	The Story of Harmelodia (1999)

Professional ratings
Review scores
Source	Rating
Allmusic	link

The Nightlines Sessions is a 1998 album by Rheostatics.

The album was recorded as a live session for the final episode of CBC Stereo's late night music program Night Lines, hosted by David Wisdom. It is a largely tossed-off and improvised affair, showing the band indulging their silly sides. It is an enjoyable diversion for fans, but even the band acknowledges that casual listeners will likely find it weird and unlistenable.

The session aired on August 31, 1997.

One song from the session, "Stolen Car", had appeared on an earlier Rheostatics album (1997's Double Live). Another song, "The Junction Foil Ball", was rerecorded for the later Night of the Shooting Stars.

== Track listing ==
As with many of the band's albums, songwriting is credited to varying combinations of the band members: Martin Tielli, Dave Bidini and Tim Vesely. (Don Kerr does not receive songwriting credits.) Credits for each song are listed next to the title.

1. "The Pooby Song" (Dave Bidini) – 2:13
2. "The Junction Foil Ball" (Martin Tielli) – 4:20
3. "Frank" (Bidini) – 4:22
4. "Henry's Musical Beard" (Tim Vesely) – 0:27
5. "Majorca" (Vesely) – 3:58
6. "Ugly Manhattan" (Tielli) – 1:45
7. "Trans Jam" (Rheostatics, Farm Fresh and the Subliminal Kid) – 4:11
8. "Alien Boy" (Tielli, Vesely) – 1:12
9. "Baby, I Love You" (Tielli, Vesely) – 3:41
10. "This is Nightlines" (Bidini) – 2:45
11. "Stolen Car" (Bidini) – 5:25
12. "Don't Say Goodnight" (Bidini) – 1:41
