= Age (album) =

Studio album by the Hidden Cameras
- Released: January 21, 2014
- Genre: Indie rock
- Label: EvilEvil
- Producer: Joel Gibb

The Hidden Cameras chronology
Origin:Orphan (2009)	Age (2014)	Home on Native Land (2016)

Age is the sixth studio album by the Hidden Cameras.

The lead single "Gay Goth Scene" was released in July 2013. The video for the single was directed by Kai Stänicke, who received the "Short Film Award for Human Rights" at San Marino International Film Festival awards, "Tadgell’s Bluebell Honor Award", being named "Best Short Film About/For Youth" at the 16th Auburn International Film Festival for Children and Young Adults in Sydney, Australia, and best German short at the International Queer Film Festival Hamburg, Germany.

The cover art work is by Joel Gibb and Paul P. The interior drawing of Chelsea Manning is by G.B. Jones.

== Track listing ==
1. "Skin & Leather" (4:48)
2. "Bread for Brat" (2:45)
3. "Doom" (4:17)
4. "Gay Goth Scene" (4:54)
5. "Afterparty" (6:11)
6. "Carpe Jugular" (4:51)
7. "Ordinary Over You" (2:18)
8. "Year of the Spawn" (4:48)
