= Don Kerr =

Canadian musician and producer

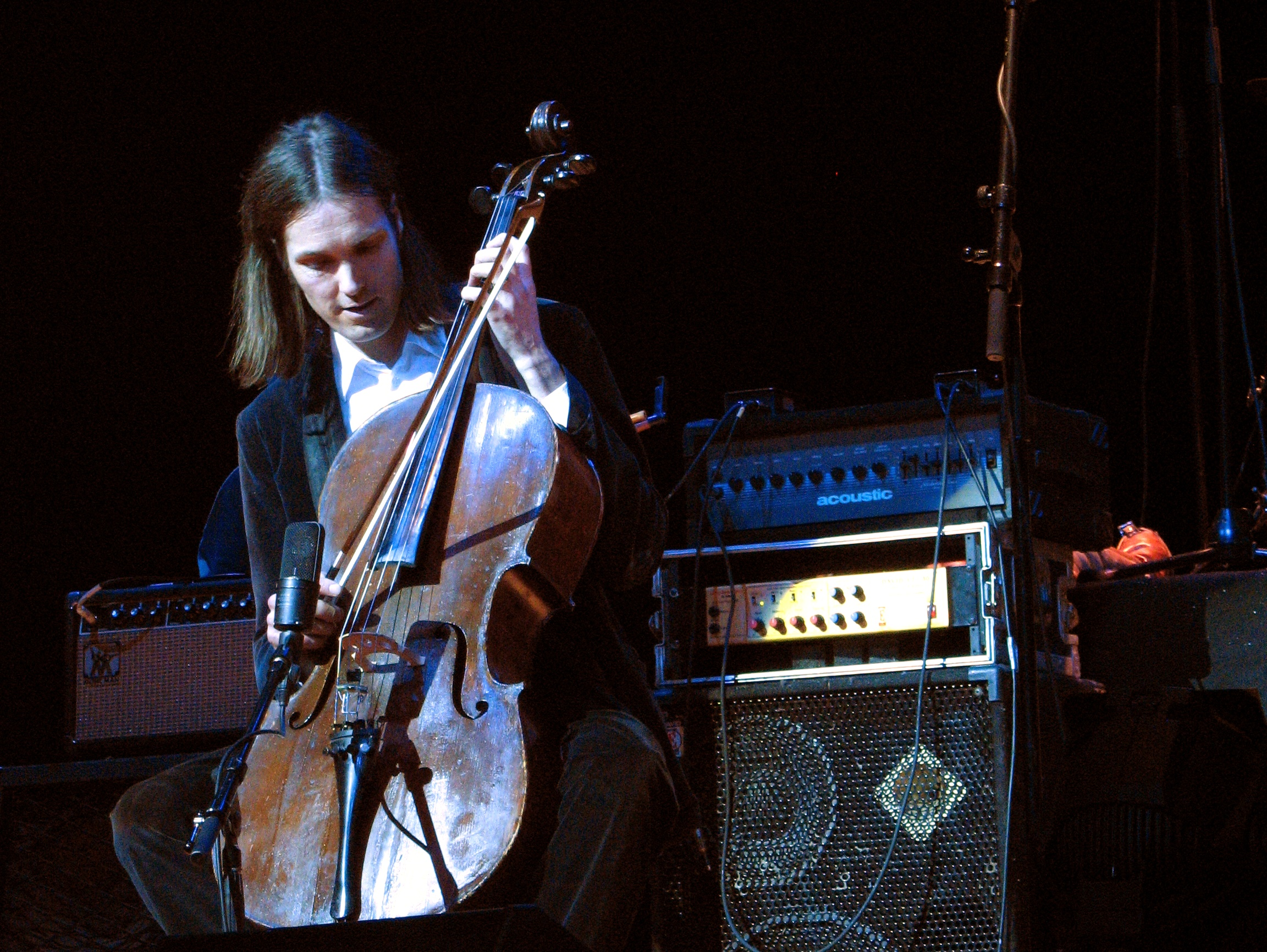
- Kerr in 2007

Background information
- Born: Donald Kerr
- Origin: Canada
- Genre: Indie rock
- Occupations: Musician, record producer, songwriter
- Instruments: Drums, cello, vocals, guitar
- Years active: 1983–present

Don Kerr is a Canadian multi-instrumentalist and record producer. He is the drummer, lead singer and front man of Toronto band, Communism. He plays in Ron Sexsmith's band, and sometimes with The Kelele Brothers and Dan Mangan.

== Early life ==
Kerr studied guitar as a child; he experimented with a number of instruments as a teenager, and later studied drumming with Jim Blackley.

== Career ==
Kerr was a member of Rheostatics from 1995 to 2001; he recorded on several of their albums, and performed on a number of instruments, including cello and bass. Kerr participated in Rheostatics live shows in 2015, and again recording and planned live shows in 2025.

He and Sexsmith released an album together, Destination Unknown, in 2005; the album, which features their vocal harmonies, was produced by Kerr.

He has also played with and mixed for The Hidden Cameras, Minotaurs, BidiniBand and Bahamas.

Kerr also acted in the Canadian independent film, Amy George (2011), alongside his wife, Claudia Dey.

Kerr was producer for Karyn Ellis' 2010 album Even Though The Sky Was Falling. He set up a recording studio, "Rooster", in his home; In 2012 he produced the album Letters Home for Amy Campbell.

In 2014, along with guitarist Paul Linklater and bassist Kevin Lacroix, Kerr founded the Toronto-based band Communism. Their debut album, Get Down Get Together, was released in 2016. The band has performed at the Hillside Festival, Fuji Rock Festival, Atlin Arts & Music Festival and Farms for Change Festival.

In 2016, Kerr produced Toronto songwriter Charlotte Cornfield's second album, Future Snowbird, and later Shawna Caspi's album Forest Fire.

In 2017, Kerr drummed for Tamara Lindeman's album The Weather Station.

== Personal life ==
Kerr and Canadian writer Claudia Dey married in 2005. They live in Toronto and have two children.

== Discography ==
=== Bahamas ===
- Sad Hunk (2020)

=== BidiniBand ===
- The Land Is Wild (2009)
- In The Rock Hall (2012)
- The Motherland (2014)

=== Communism ===
- Get Down Get Together (2016)
- Lovespeech (2023)

=== Minotaurs ===
- The Thing (2010)

=== Rheostatics ===
- Music Inspired by the Group of Seven (1995)
- The Blue Hysteria (1996)
- Double Live (1997)
- The Nightlines Sessions (1998)
- The Story of Harmelodia (1999)
- Night of the Shooting Stars (2001)
- The Great Lakes Suite (2025)

=== Sexsmith & Kerr ===
- Destination Unknown (2005)

=== The Hidden Cameras ===
- Mississauga Goddam (2004)
- Awoo (2006)
- Origin:Orphan (2009)

=== Solo ===
- The Sniffing Princess (1999)
- Carny Soundtrack (2008)
