= Maggie MacDonald =

- Born: 1978 (age 47–48)
- Origin: Cornwall, Ontario, Canada
- Genres: Punk rock
- Occupations: Writer, playwright, musician

Maggie MacDonald (born 1978) is a writer, playwright, and musician who lives in Toronto, Ontario.

== Early life and education ==
MacDonald grew up in Cornwall, Ontario, where she became active in the local independent rock music scene. She put on shows and created a fanzine called Saucy, which gained attention outside of Cornwall as well. Dubbed the "punk-rock valedictorian," she also grew into politics. She served as a student trustee on her school board at the age of 17. She left Cornwall to attend the University of Toronto.

== Career ==
Returning to Cornwall at age 20, MacDonald ran in the 1999 provincial election as the New Democratic Party candidate in the electoral district of Stormont—Dundas—Charlottenburgh. Facing two redistributed incumbents–(Liberal John Cleary and Tory Noble Villeneuve), for a single seat in the Legislative Assembly of Ontario, she was given next to no chance to win the election. Her innovative campaign strategy, including the use of a guerrilla theatre play called Revolution Mall Style, drew praise and attention.

MacDonald's second play, A Clockwork Gorbachev, won the Hart House Playwrighting Award in 2000 and the Robertson Davies Award For Playwriting in 2001.

She began to pursue her musical interests, and joined The Hidden Cameras, with whom she has performed since 2001. She has also been a member of several other bands. The first was Barcelona Pavilion, with whom she recorded a 7" single. She then formed the band The Dating Service. For a time, she was a guest vocalist with Kids on TV, recording "Bitchsy" for the 2005 Lesbians on Ecstasy remixes LP Giggles in the Dark. She became lead vocalist with Republic of Safety, whose first EP, Passport, came out in March 2005. Their second EP, Vacation, was released in the spring of 2006; their third, Succession in 2008.

At the same time, she has had comics and writing published in Toronto publications such as The Globe and Mail, Lola, and Broken Pencil.

In 2005, MacDonald published her first book, Kill the Robot. A science fiction novel critiquing consumer society, it is also illustrated by MacDonald.

Her second play, The Rat King, first previewed as a work in progress in early 2004, received a public reading in the spring of 2005 and finally premiered as a full production in January 2006. Later MacDonald approached Bob Wiseman to collaborate on writing music for the songs. The Rat King was then mounted a second time in August 2006 as part of Harbourfront's "Indie Unlimited" series, and then at the New York Fringe Festival.

As of 2022, MacDonald was working in communications in the not-for-profit sector.

== Publication ==
- Kill the Robot, MacGilligan Books, 2005, ISBN 1-894692-14-4

== Discography ==
- "Barcelona Pavilion" 7" single, Blocks Recording Club, 2001
- The Smell of Our Own, The Hidden Cameras, Rough Trade Records, 2003
- Mississauga Goddam, The Hidden Cameras, Rough Trade, 2004
- "Bitchsy", Kids on TV, Giggles in the Dark, Lesbians on Ecstasy (remixes), Alien8 Recordings, 2005
- Passport (ep)|Passport, Republic of Safety, Independent, 2005
- Vacation (ep)|Vacation, Republic of Safety, Ta-Da Records, 2006
- Mixing Business With Pleasure, Kids on TV, 2007
- Succession, Republic of Safety, Independent, 2008
