= Joel Gibb =

Canadian musician (born 1977)

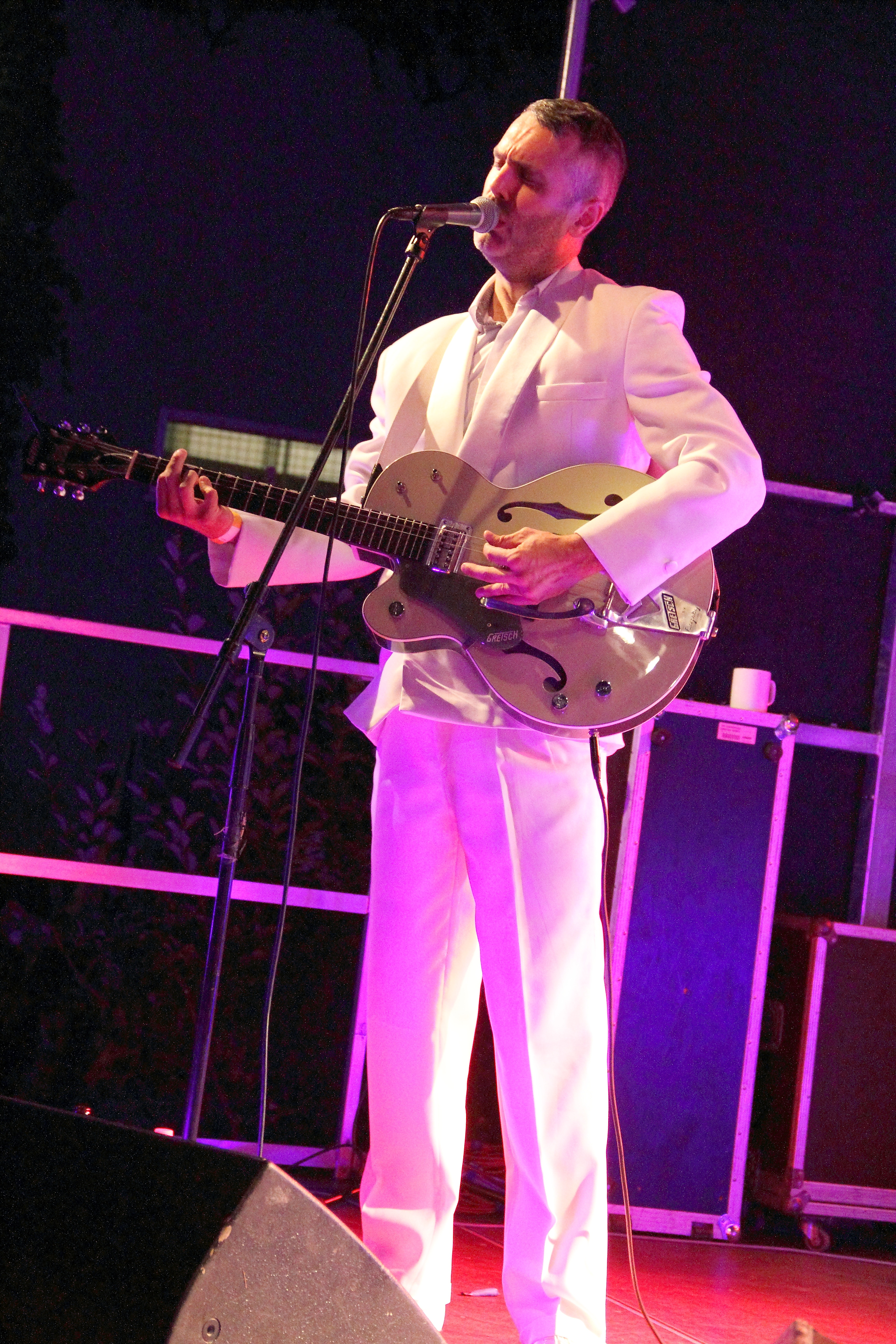
- Gibb in 2018

Background information
- Born: 28 January 1977 (age 49); Kincardine, Ontario, Canada
- Occupations: Artist, singer-songwriter
- Label: Rough Trade

Joel W. Gibb (born 28 January 1977) is a Berlin-based Canadian artist and singer-songwriter who leads the "gay church folk" group The Hidden Cameras. He was born in Kincardine, Ontario.

== Career ==
His first involvement with the music scene was as editor of a fanzine devoted to independent bands, Glamour Guide for Trash. He also hosted a radio show at CFRE-FM, the campus radio station of the University of Toronto Mississauga. At the same time, he was writing his own songs and, in 2001, he released some of his recordings under the name The Hidden Cameras on his own independent record label EvilEvil, a CD entitled Ecce Homo.

He then gathered together a group of musicians to perform his work, playing everywhere from art galleries to churches to porn theatres to parks. Along the way, the band grew to include up to thirteen members, including a string section, choir and go-go dancers, its audience growing at the same time.

In 2003, The Hidden Cameras were signed to Rough Trade, a well-known British record label who released the band's next album, The Smell of Our Own the same year. They began to tour North America and Europe extensively. In 2004, the album Mississauga Goddam was released, followed by The Arms of His 'Ill' on the California label Absolutely Kosher Records. The album Awoo came out in 2006 on Rough Trade Records, EvilEvil, and Arts & Crafts, and the fifth studio album, Origin:Orphan, was released 22 September 2009 on the Arts & Crafts label. All The Hidden Cameras releases to date have been produced by Joel Gibb. In 2007, solo recordings by Gibb were released on the tribute to Arthur Russell compilation EP, Four Songs by Arthur Russell. On 21 January 2014, Age, the sixth studio album by The Hidden Cameras, was released.

Gibb exhibits his artwork in various galleries and has been included in group shows in the past at the Tate Modern, among others. His work comprises drawings and banners, both of which are featured on The Hidden Cameras CDs and records. He also shows the videos he has directed for The Hidden Cameras. In 2007, Joel Gibb made his New York gallery debut at Sunday L.E.S. (now Horton Gallery).

In 2008, Joel Gibb made his acting debut, alongside Jena von Brücker, Mark Ewert, Calvin Johnson, Jen Smith, and Vaginal Davis, as one of the stars of the film The Lollipop Generation, directed by G.B. Jones. The film also features music by The Hidden Cameras.

Two of his song lyrics, "He Is the Boss of Me" and "A Miracle", appear in John Barton and Billeh Nickerson's 2007 anthology Seminal: The Anthology of Canada's Gay Male Poets.

Gibb contributed to R.E.M.'s album Collapse into Now, with backing vocals on the track "It Happened Today".

In 2012, Gibb provided guitar and harmony vocals on the Pet Shop Boys song "In His Imagination".

Gibb currently lives in Berlin. At one point, Gibb lived in Mississauga, Ontario.
