= Home on Native Land =

- Cover of Home on Native Land by the Hidden Cameras Cover design by Jeff Harris

Studio album by the Hidden Cameras
- Released: October 28, 2016
- Studio: Rooster
- Genre: Folk, country
- Label: Outside Music

The Hidden Cameras chronology
Age (2014)	Home on Native Land (2016)	BRONTO (2025)

Professional ratings
Review scores
Source	Rating
Exclaim!	8/10
The Independent	4/5 stars
Record Collector	4/5 stars
Rolling Stone	3.5/5 stars

Home on Native Land is the seventh studio album by the Hidden Cameras, released on Outside Music on October 28, 2016.

The album is an inquisitive ode to lead singer Joel Gibb's homeland as well as marking a figurative and literal return. The record was recorded over 10 years with guest appearances by Rufus Wainwright, Feist, Ron Sexsmith, Neil Tennant, Bahamas and Mary Margaret O'Hara including original compositions as well as covers of "Dark End of the Street" and "Don't Make Promises" by Tim Hardin and Canadian classic "Log Driver's Waltz".

The lead single "Day I Left Home" was released on August 31, 2016. The video for the single was directed by Canadian artist Geoffrey Farmer. The second single "Twilight of the Season" was released on October 31, 2016, with a video directed by Canadian film director Sean Michael Turrell. A third video was released for "Had a Feeling 'Bout You" on November 16, 2016, directed by Joel Gibb. A fourth video was released for "Dark End of the Street" on December 2, 2016, directed by Canadian artist and filmmaker G. B. Jones.

== Track listing ==
No.	Title	Writer(s)	Length
1.	"The Day I Left Home"		3:49
2.	"He Is the Boss of Me"		2:53
3.	"Ode to an Ah"		1:58
4.	"Dark End of the Street"	Dan Penn	3:31
5.	"You and Me Again"		4:27
6.	"Log Driver's Waltz"		3:06
7.	"Be What I Want"		3:32
8.	"Counting Stars"		5:27
9.	"The Great Reward"		3:57
10.	"Big Blue"		3:18
11.	"Don't Make Promises"		2:03
12.	"Drunk Dancer's Waltz"		2:53
13.	"Had a Feeling 'Bout You"		3:19
14.	"Twilight of the Season"		4:32
