= Sparrows (band) =

2010s Canadian post-hardcore band

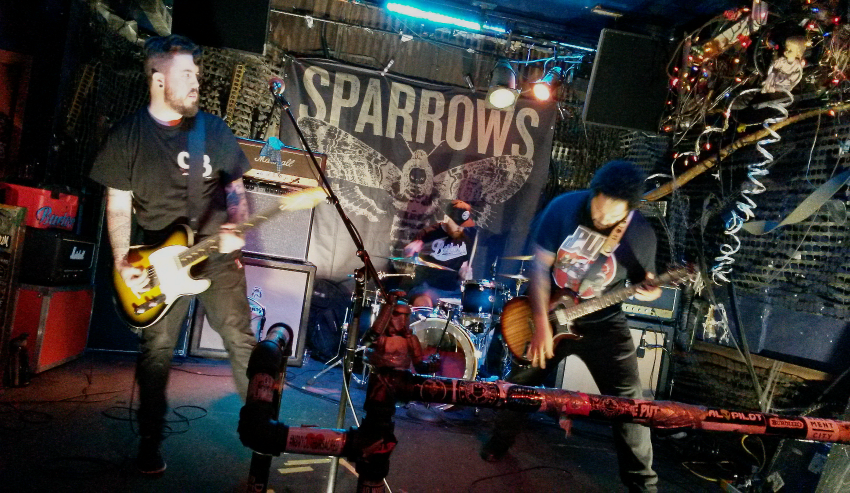
- Sparrows performing in Toronto, Ontario in 2018. From left to right: Dan Thomson, Jon Busby, and Justin Sears.

Background information
- Origin: Ottawa, Ontario, Canada
- Genres: Punk (early); post-hardcore; rock
- Years active: 2010–2020
- Labels: Sound Anxiety; New Damage; Dine Alone
- Members: Dan Thomson; Jon Busby; Alex Pley
- Past members: Justin Sears; Jack Panic; Jaret Maillet; Kevin Dennison; Matthew Sears; Rembrandt MacLeod; Devlin Morton; Brandon Desjardins; Krys Blaney; Marco Celucci; Richard Hill
- Website: sparrows613.com

Sparrows was a three-piece post-hardcore band originally from Ottawa, Ontario, Canada. Formed in 2010, the band consists of vocalist/guitarist Dan Thomson, guitarist Alex Pley, and drummer Jon Busby. In March 2015, the group was named one of Alternative Press magazine's "100 Bands You Need to Know".

== History ==
In 2010 lead vocalist and guitarist Dan Thomson recruited Marco Cellucci to form a band which would become the original Ottawa based iteration of Sparrows. After releasing their first EP Goliath in May 2011 (with the addition of bassist Richard Hill and touring guitarist Krys Blaney) the group shifted into a complete lineup change the following January in which Devlin Morton, Brandon Dejardins, and Rembrandt MacLeod would replace Hill, Blaney, and Cellucci. The band released their LP Cold Ground in July 2013 through Broken Heart/Kat Kat Records before moving to Toronto and continuing to tour extensively performing across Canada and the United States including festivals; SXSW, NXNE, Canadian Music Week, and the Ottawa Bluesfest.

In April 2014 Jon Busby, and Justin Sears would replace Morton, and MacLeod with Matthew Sears taking over from Brandon Dejardins during the fall of that same year. In 2015 the group was signed to Toronto-based aggressive rock label New Damage Records and shortly after released their second EP Dragging Hell in August of that year. Following the release of their EP bassist Matthew left the band (citing personal reasons) and was replaced by Kevin Dennison and after another series of North American tours the band released their debut LP Let the Silence Stay Where It Was in October 2016 on New Damage Records. In March of the following year bassist Kevin Dennison ended his tenure with the group with replacement Jaret Maillet stepping in until October 2017. Prior to the departure of Maillet the band supported Grammy Award winning American metalcore group Norma Jean during their "Polar Summer Tour".

In May 2019 the group announced their third studio album Failed Gods via Sound Anxiety Records with the addition of bassist Jack Panic. The following month the group debuted the video for their single "Fifth Helena Drive" featuring local Toronto venue Sneaky Dee's, the same day the restaurant announced their collaborative dish "Fifth Helena Homefries".

In November 2019 the band announced via Facebook a new lineup featuring Thomson, Busby, and the addition of guitarist Alex Pley.

In September of 2020, Sparrows released the two song EP Death Crown digitally. These two tracks were recorded earlier in 2020 with Mario Quintero of Spotlights.

Sparrows played their final show on Friday the 13th of March, 2020 in Oakville, Ontario. Initial Covid-19 lockdowns began around this date. During the Covid-19 pandemic, Sparrows' Daniel Thomson and Alex Pley began writing songs for what would become their next and current project, Toronto band lowheaven. lowheaven has already toured the United States supporting headliners Holy Fawn.

== Musical style ==
Sparrows is considered post-hardcore utilizing melodic elements of punk and rock throughout their music. In 2013, Alternative Press described their sound as "If Moneen sounded evil" as Moneen guitarist/vocalist Kenny Bridges had produced three records for the group. A 2019 article from Metal Injection compared the group's blasts of distortion and use of dynamics to the American alternative metal group Deftones.

== Band members ==
=== Final line-up ===
- Dan Thomson – lead vocals, guitar (2010–2020)
- Jon Busby – drums (2014–2020)
- Alex Pley – guitar (2019–2020)

=== Former members ===
- Justin Sears – guitar (2014–2019)
- Jack Panic – bass guitar (2018–2019)
- Jaret Maillet – bass guitar (2016–2017)
- Kevin Dennison – bass guitar (2015–2016)
- Matthew Sears – bass guitar (2014–2015)
- Rembrandt MacLeod – drums (2012–2014)
- Devlin Morton – guitar (2012–2014)
- Brandon Desjardins – bass guitar (2012–2014)
- Krys Blaney – guitar (2010–2011)
- Marco Cellucci – drums (2010–2011)
- Richard Hill – bass guitar (2010–2011)

== Discography ==
Sparrows have released three EP's and three albums

=== EPs ===
- 2011: Goliath
- 2015: Dragging Hell
- 2020: Death Crown

=== Albums ===
- 2013: Cold Ground
- 2016: Let the Silence Stay Where It Was
- 2019: Failed Gods

== Music videos ==
- "Cave Eater" (2016)
- "References To The Dead" (2016)
- "The Written Rules Of Choking" (2017)
- "A Little Crowded Death" (2019)
- "Fifth Helena Drive" (2019)
- "Worship Song" (2019)
