= Night of the Shooting Stars =

Studio album by Rheostatics
- Released: 2001
- Genre: Indie rock
- Label: Perimeter

Rheostatics chronology
The Story of Harmelodia (1999)	Night of the Shooting Stars (2001)	2067 (2004)

Professional ratings
Review scores
Source	Rating
Allmusic	link

Night of the Shooting Stars is a 2001 album by Canadian rock band Rheostatics, released on Perimeter Records.

It is the band's first traditional studio album since 1996's The Blue Hysteria. It is also Don Kerr's final album with the band.

Two songs on the album are new versions of songs that appeared on earlier albums. "Song of the Garden" first appeared on 1999's The Story of Harmelodia, and "The Junction Foil Ball" appeared on 1998's The Nightlines Sessions.

== Track listing ==
As with most of the band's albums, songwriting credit goes to varying combinations of the band members: Martin Tielli, Dave Bidini and Tim Vesely. (Kerr does not receive songwriting credits.) Credit for each song is listed below.

1. "These Days Are Good for the Canadian Conservative Youth Party Alliance" (Martin Tielli) – 5:44
2. "Song of the Garden" (Dave Merritt, Mike Bonnell) – 3:28
3. "Mumbletypeg" (Dave Bidini) – 3:50
4. "P.I.N." (Tielli) – 3:38
5. "Superdifficult" (Tim Vesely) – 2:36
6. "The Junction Foil Ball" (Tielli) – 4:51
7. "We Went West" (Vesely) – 5:12
8. "The Fire" (Bidini, Tielli) – 5:37
9. "In It Now" (Vesely) – 2:08
10. "Here to There to You" (Bidini) – 3:25
11. "The Reward" (Tielli) – 4:21
12. "Remain Calm" (Vesely) – 3:56
13. "Satan is the Whistler" (Tielli) – 6:05
