= Friendly Rich =

Canadian composer and musician

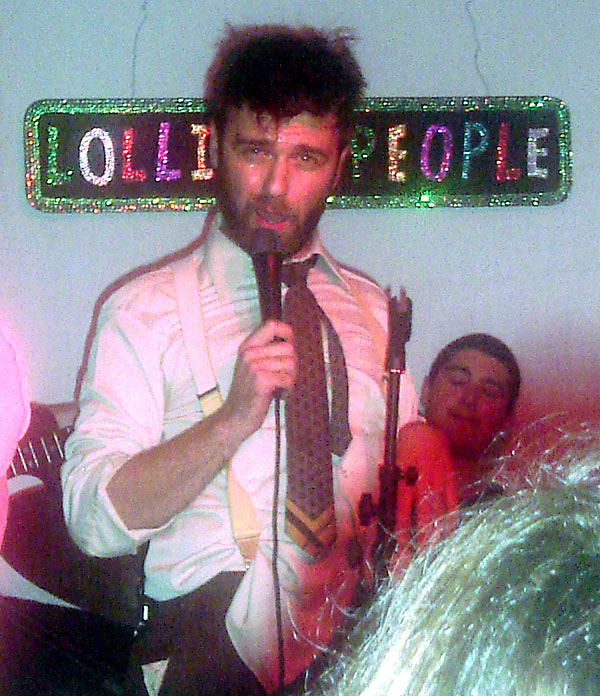
Friendly Rich performing with The Lollipop People at Pop Montreal in 2005.

Friendly Rich, born Richard Marsella, is a Canadian music composer and musician from Brampton, Ontario. He has independently released a number of albums of satirical and melodramatic songs. His music has been featured on CBC and The Tom Green Show.

== Early life and education ==
Marsella earned a Master's degree in music at the University of Toronto under the supervision of Lee Bartel and composer R. Murray Schafer, studying mainly musical instrument construction and parade pedagogy. In 2021, Marsella earned a PhD in music education at the University of Toronto, with his dissertation The Musical Playground as a Vehicle for Community Building.

== Career ==
Rich composed background music for three seasons of MTV's The Tom Green Show. Since 1994, he has recorded exclusively for his own eclectic record label, The Pumpkin Pie Corporation.

Friendly Rich has produced and composed nine full-length CDs, which have been featured on CBC Radio One (five documentaries for Outfront), CBC Radio 2 (continuous airplay on Brave New Waves), TFO (VOLT) and Muchmusic (Muchnews, BradTV).

In 2000, Friendly Rich founded the Brampton Indie Arts Festival, an annual event which promotes underground artists, held in February at the Rose Theatre in downtown Brampton. This event, under Rich's direction, has featured Nash the Slash, The Nihilist Spasm Band, Ron Sexsmith, Cuff the Duke, Bob Wiseman, John Oswald, Moneen, Scott Thompson, and Hayden.

Friendly Rich and his live ensemble The Lollipop People signed a deal with Hazelwood Records (Germany) to release two albums in Europe. They have since toured Europe three times; the first album to be released there was We Need a New F-Word.

Rich's 2007 album The Friendly Rich Show, with the feel of a Vaudeville act, exemplified his satirical song-writing style, combining beat poetry and political commentary.

Dinosaur Power, also released in Europe, appeared on the !earshot National Top 50 Chart in 2008. The third to have a European release, 2010's The Sacred Prune of Remembrance, noisily combined music from several genres.

In 2014, Rich released a solo album, Bountiful, and performed in support of it with the Lollipop People at the Horseshoe Tavern in Toronto.

In 2018, Friendly Rich arranged and performed, with the Lollipop People, Russian composer Modest Mussorgsky's piano solo Pictures at an Exhibition.

In 2023, Friendly Rich released his Man Out of Time recording on vinyl through the We Are Busy Bodies record label.

== Film and television credits ==
- 1994 to 1996 - Composer for children's TV series "The King Stanlislav Show" (Russia)
- 1998 to 2001- Background music for MTV's "The Tom Green Show"
- 2005 - 3 pieces used in Thom Fitzgerald's 3 Needles (director's cut) starring Lucy Liu.
- 2006 - Old Trout Puppet Workshop short film (featuring The Lollipop People).
- 2022 - Score for Gabrielle Favaretto's short animated film Tadpole.
