= Vaginal Davis =

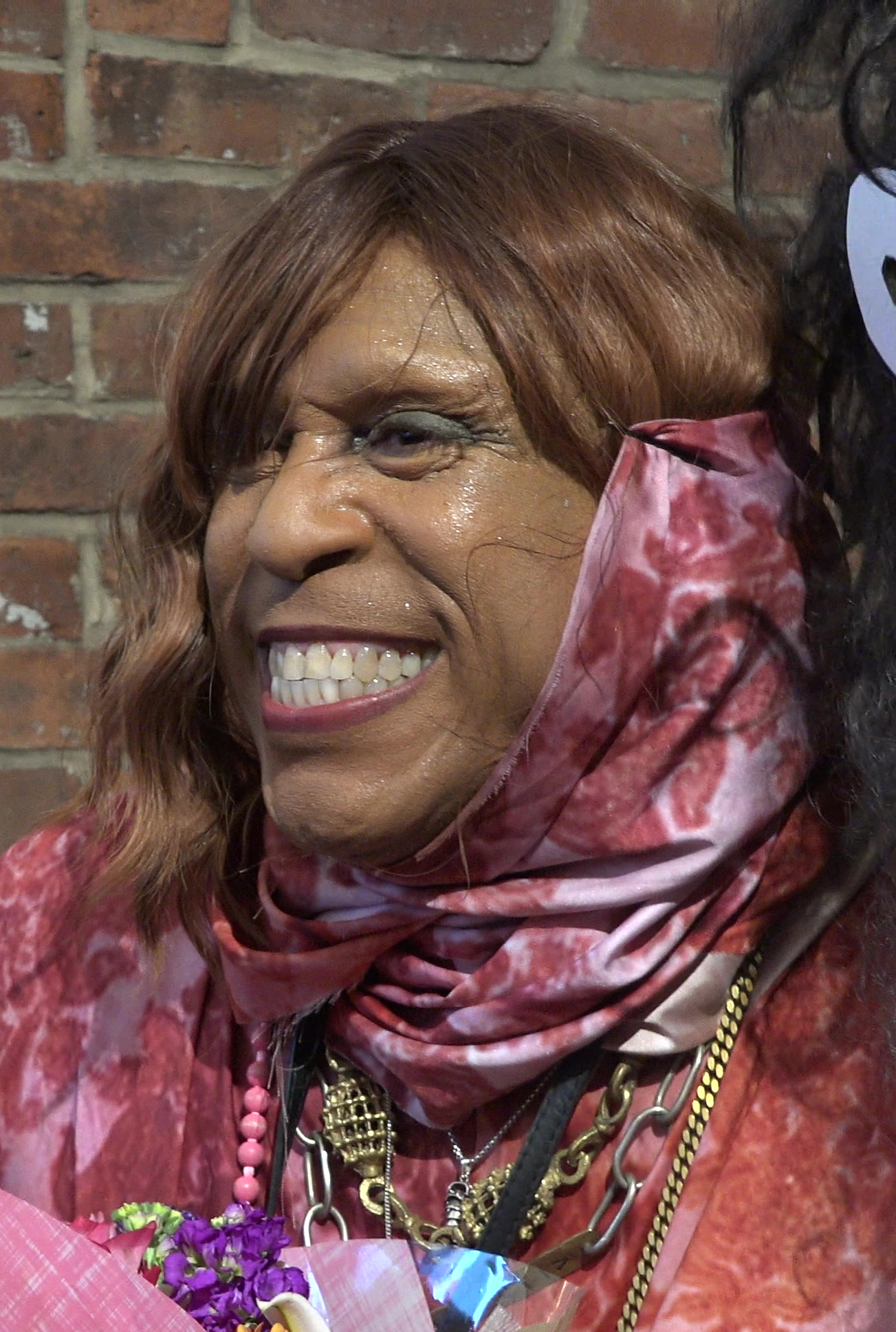
- at MoMA PS1 in 2025

Background information
- Also known as: Dr. Vaginal Davis; Vaginal Creme Davis; Mistress Veronika V'intrest; The Walking Installation Piece, Graciela, Miss Bricktops
- Origin: Los Angeles, California
- Genres: Punk rock; experimental; queercore; performance art
- Occupations: musician; zinester; television presenter; hostess; gossip columnist; author; performance artist; experimental film-maker
- Years active: 1976 – present
- Labels: Amoeba Records & Filmworks; Spectra Sonic Records; Mr. Lady; Chongo Records; Dischord Records
- Website: www.vaginaldavis.com

Vaginal Davis (born in Los Angeles, California) is an American performer, painter, independent curator, composer, film-maker and writer. Born intersex and raised in South Central, Los Angeles, Davis gained notoriety in New York during the 1980s, where she inspired the Bushwick neighborhood of Brooklyn's prevalent drag scene as a genderqueer artist. She currently resides in Berlin, Germany.

== Early life ==
Growing up, Davis lived with her mother, originally from Louisiana, and four older sisters. Her mother was Black Creole, her father was of Mexican and Jewish descent, and her grandfather was of German descent, with Davis stating that he was born in Wannsee and was the "black sheep" of the von Hohenzollern dynasty. Davis' mother was a revolutionary feminist and community activist in the South Central area, and planted food gardens in vacant lots to help feed the homeless, impoverished, and marginalized peoples of the area. As a young child in the Los Angeles public education system, Davis was accepted into a program for gifted students, where she was first exposed to and developed a love of theater and opera. At age seven, Davis saw Mozart's The Magic Flute on a school trip to the opera, and credits this experience as a catalyst for her development as a drag queen.

== Career ==
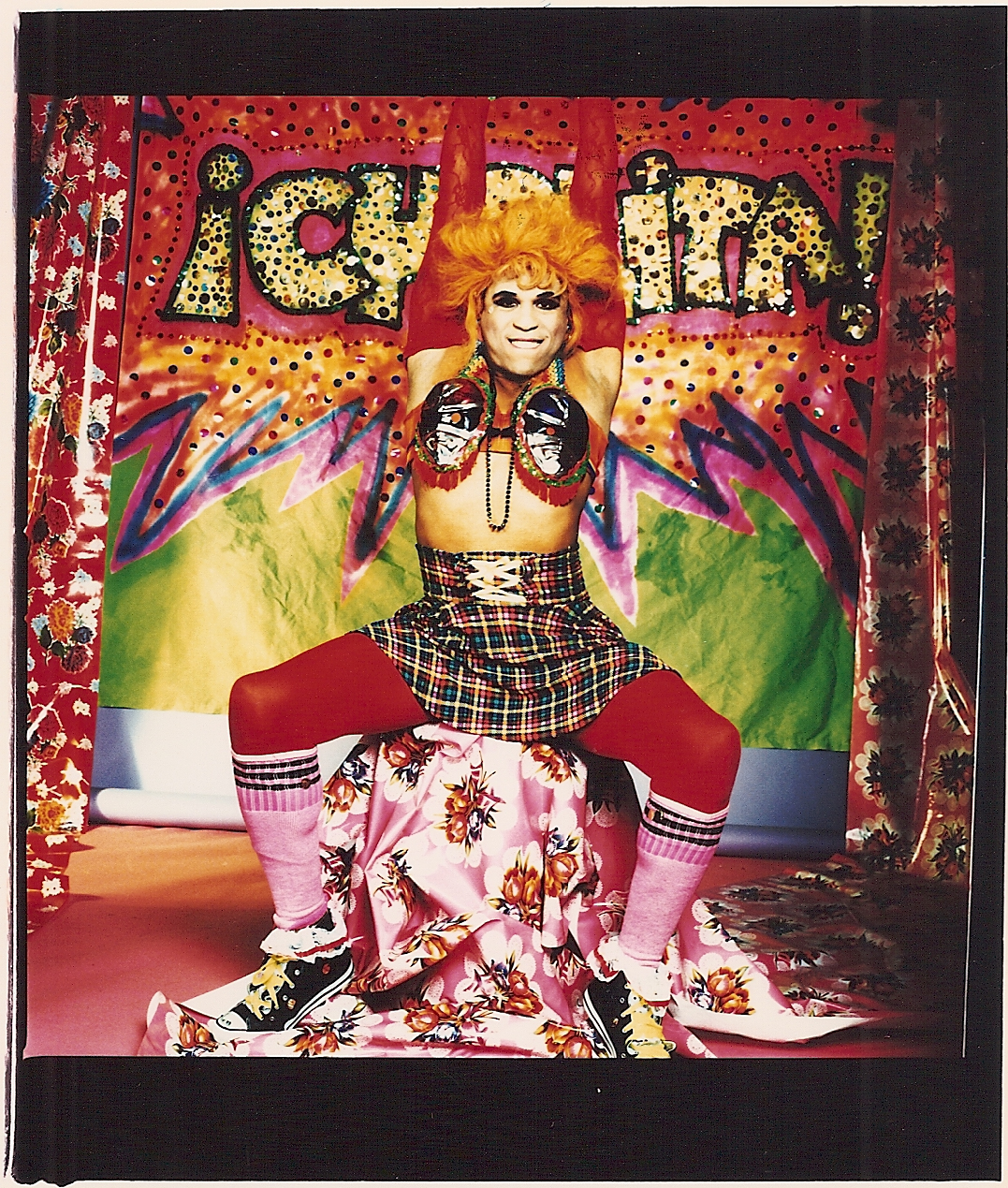
Graciela Grejalva aka Vaginal Davis, 2012

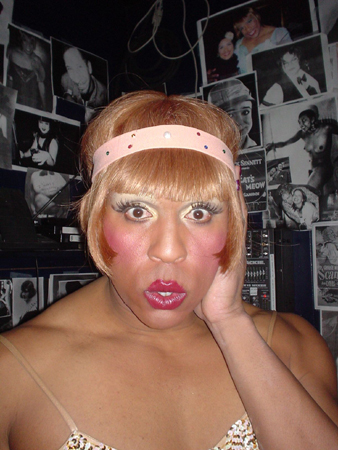
Vaginal Davis as "Bricktop" in 2004

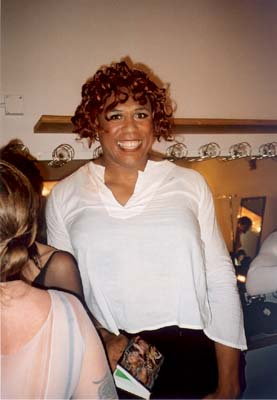
Vaginal Davis 2005

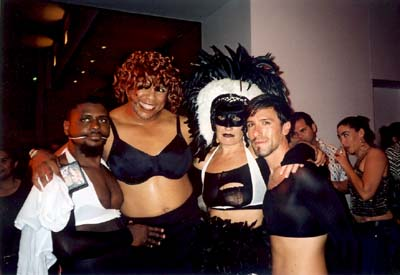
Vaginal Davis with models, 2005

Davis' name pays homage to activist Angela Davis, and considers Davis' involvement with the Black Panther Party and activism as a whole to be one of her biggest inspirations, explaining, "They came into the schools, they had guns, and they took over. They were teaching us all these revolutionary songs and chants and what not. At that time, when Angela Davis was the most wanted woman in America, I was just fixated with that image of her. By the late '70s I had decided I sort of wanted to sexualize her name and become her, more or less. So I started in the late '70s calling myself Vaginal Davis. I started to perform– or tried to perform– at these gay clubs in Los Angeles, in Hollywood. The people in these clubs, they would look at me and say, 'Vaginal Davis? Well who are you supposed to be?' And I said, 'Well, Angela Davis– it's a homage to that.' And they'd say, 'Well who's that?' They didn't know who Angela Davis was."

Vaginal Davis is one of the founders of the homo-core punk movement. She chooses to exploit herself to engage in rude provocations and "gender-fucking." As a self-labeled "sexual repulsive", she is an icon of the disruptive performance aesthetic known as terrorist drag.

=== 1970–1989: Career beginnings ===
Vaginal Davis' band the Afro Sisters released their first seven-inch EP Indigo, Sassafras & Molasses, produced by Geza X with Amoeba Records in 1978. The Afro Sisters opened for the Smiths on their first American tour, as well as the Happy Mondays.

Vaginal Davis is often associated with the formation of the Queercore zine movement. From 1982 to 1991, she self-published the zine Fertile La Toyah Jackson, focused on the imaginary adventures of a skateboarding, pregnant Jackson, and hailed by The Advocate critic Adam Block as "A veritable John Waters film of a skinny 'zine." Bruce LaBruce described the zine as "an underground rag that featured SoCal punk scene gossip, photos of hot Huntington Beach surfers and wistful musings by Miss Davis themself." Through Davis' job at UCLA's Placement & Career Planning Center, she was allowed free access to a Xerox machine to publish the zine. Davis went on to develop the zine into a series of videos titled Fertile LaToyah Jackson Video Magazine, Volume 1 and 2.

=== 1989–1999: Bands ===
Davis was well known for her band ¡Cholita! The Female Menudo, where she assumed the persona of a 13 1/2-year-old Latina named Graciela. Band mates included longtime collaborator Alice Bag as Sad Girl and Fertile LaToyah Jackson as Guadalupe, ages 16 and 12 1/2 respectively.

In 1989, Davis formed the speed metal thrash band Pedro, Muriel, and Esther (PME) with Glen Meadmore. In PME, Davis performs as Clarence, "a white-supremacist militia-man from Idaho complete with ZZ Top beard." Davis had previously sung backup vocals for Meadmore, with RuPaul. PME disbanded after releasing a four-song EP on Amoeba records.

Davis formed the band Black Fag in 1992 with Bibbe Hansen. Through the persona Rayvn Cymone McFarlane, Davis parodied the LA alternative scene, while engaging in performative actions such as spraying the audience with milk from her bra. Black Fag's album Passover Satyr was released by Dischord Records that same year and was produced by Sonic Youth's Kim Gordon. The band's 1995 album 11 Harrow House was produced by Hansen's son Beck.

In 1995, Pedro, Muriel, and Esther reunited for a performance at the Queercore '95 festival in Chicago. The band later released their first full-length album The White to Be Angry, produced by Steve Albini in 1998 on Spectra Sonic Records.

=== 2000–2009: Move to Germany ===
In Los Angeles, Davis has hosted and DJ'd a range of performance and music events, one of the most prominent being "Bricktops" (2002–2005), a weekly salon/speak-easy inspired by vaudevillian Ada "Bricktop" Smith. they also hosted and DJed a Sunday afternoon music event called "Sucker" (1994–2000). Davis and artist Ron Athey curated and hosted GIMP (2000–2001), a monthly night of performance art.

In 2006, Vaginal Davis moved from Los Angeles to Berlin, Germany.

In 2009, Pedro, Muriel and Esther reunited in a 20th-anniversary show presented in New York City by Participant Inc. as part of Performa 09.

=== 2010–present: Performance, visual art, and teaching ===
Davis' performance piece "Speaking from the Diaphragm" ran from May 15 to 27, 2010, at Performance Space 122. The show parodied television talk shows and featured interviews by Carole Pope, Jamie Stewart, Joel Gibb, and Glen Meadmore and was co-hosted by Carmelita Tropicana and Jennifer Miller.

In January 2012 Davis participated in the J. Paul Getty's "Pacific Standard Time Performance Festival, with "My Pussy Is Still in Los Angeles (I Only Live in Berlin)" at Southwestern Law School, Louis XVI-style Tea Room (originally Bullocks Wilshire Department Store). April 2012, Davis debuted live her band Tenderloin as part of the festival "Camp/Anti-Camp: A Queer Guide to Everyday Life" at Hebbel am Ufer. Tenderloin's line-up consisted of Felix Knoke, Jan Klesse, Joel Gibb, and Vaginal Davis performing under the alias "Dagmar Hofpfisterei.". In August 2012 the band was invited by curator Anthony Hegarty to perform at the Meltdown Festival at the Southbank Centre in London with Kembra Pfahler and the Voluptuous Horror of Karen Black. After the performances Tenderloin released the music video for "The Golden One" that featured drag queen the Goddess Bunny and was directed by Glen Meadmore.

From November 9 to December 16, 2012, Davis opened her first major solo exhibition of solely visual art (as opposed to performance art), titled "HAG – small, contemporary, haggard" at the Participant Inc. in New York. The name of the show is based on the gallery that Davis hosted in her Los Angeles apartment from 1982–89.

Davis has traveled to various universities and educational institutions to give lectures on her life experiences, including a talk on youth hosteling at New York University's Performance Studies complex in November 2015 with German actress and friend Susanne Sachsse. From December 1 to 5 of the same year, Davis teamed with avant-garde music group Xiu Xiu when they composed the score for her radical re-imagining of Mozart's opera The Magic Flute, performed at the 80WSE Gallery at the NYU Steinhardt School of Culture, Education, and Human Development, in partnership with Berlin's CHEAP Kollectiv.

In mid-October 2016, Davis was a keynote speaker at the Creative Time Summit in Washington, D.C., a conference on art and social issues which featured workshops and speeches on topics ranging from the Black Lives Matter movement to electoral politics.

In 2024, her work was included in Xican-a.o.x. Body a major group exhibition at the Pérez Art Museum Miami, Florida, which traveled from the Cheech Marin Center for Chicano Art & Culture of the Riverside Art Museum, California. A scholarly publication was released by Chicago University Press in tandem with the show.

From October 9, 2025 – March 2, 2026, MoMA PS1 exhibited Vaginal Davis: Magnificent Product, her first major museum show. The exhibit was also shown at the Moderna Museet, Stockholm (May 18, 2024 – October 13, 2024) and Gropius Bau, Berlin (March 21, 2025 – September 13, 2025). The PS1 exhibit included the installation “The Wicked Pavilion: Tween Bedroom” where a picture of Angela Davis can be seen.

== Artistry ==
Davis has been accepted as an artist in the queer community more recently, but "the gay world [only] became more open to what [she] did after [she] established [her]self outside of the gay world." For many years, Davis felt as though she was "too gay for the punk scene and too punk for the gay."

José Esteban Muñoz has identified Davis as a progenitor of "terrorist drag," for Davis was neither "glamour" like New York performers Candis Cayne and Girlina, nor "clown" (camp) like drag queens Varla Jean Merman and Lady Bunny. According to Davis, "I wasn't really trying to alter myself to look like a real woman. I didn't wear false eyelashes or fake breasts. It wasn't about the real-ness of traditional drag – the perfect flawless makeup. I just put on a little lipstick, a little eyeshadow and a wig and went there." Davis has several drag personas, including Princess Sellica the Sensual Psychic, R&B legend Lestar Vartan and Lieutenant Vaginal Davis of the Sexualese Liberation Front. Dominic Johnson of Frieze said, "Ms Davis consistently refuses to ease conservative tactics within gay and black politics, employing punk music, invented biography, insults, self-mockery, and repeated incitements to group sexual revolt." Davis has been critical of the co-optation of African, Hispanic, and LGBT culture by the mainstream.

Davis' performances are also, according to journalist Ali Fitzgerald, "giddy, satirical stabs at the old-world order, leveling criticism at white privilege and the patriarchy with nuanced wit and game-show-style camp. The Vaginal Davis persona is a complex mixture of queercore punk antics and MGM studio glamour, reflecting Davis' socially engaged and aesthetically consistent interests." She was also a muse to German choreographer Pina Bausch, as well as fashion designer Rick Owens and photographer Catherine Opie. Jamie Stewart of Xiu Xiu also stated that "I am bi and found artists that were androgynous hit me hard – Peter Murphy, David Bowie, Morrissey. But there was a drag queen named Vaginal Davis that changed my life. I had no idea you could be punk and a drag queen and ultra intense and insane and hot and brilliant all at the same time."

Davis also claims, in a 2015 interview with Bedford and Brooklyn's Nicole Disser, that much of her artwork and performances are inspired by her late mother's artistic ability, stating, "I'm so intertwined with my mother. My whole career as an artist, and all of my visual art, is basically co-opting my mother. My mother didn't consider herself an artist, she just made stuff. Looking back to the things that she did, they were installations, assemblages – things in the art world that have proper names to them – she was doing this way back then. If I get any notice for any of my artworks or any of my performances, it's because I just copied my mother."

In 2018, Davis was awarded $10,000 U.S. Dollars for receiving the Sustained Achievement Award from the non-profit organization Queer|Art, which offers support and mentorship to LGBTQIA+ identifying artists.

== Personal life ==
Davis has chosen to keep her exact birth year, as well as the name she was given at birth, private.

== Discography ==
=== The Afro Sisters ===
- Indigo, Sassafras & Molasses (1978)
- Maxis on Melrose (1980)
- So Black I'm Blue (1981)
- Too Black, Too Strong (1982)
- Shoulder Pads, Maxi Pads (1983)
- Magnificent Product (1984)
- Armed & Extremely Dangerous (1985)
- Wet Lesbian (1986)

=== Black Fag ===
- Parerga y Paralipomena (1992)
- Atlas Shrugged (1993)
- Passover Satyr (1994)
- 11 Harrow House (1995)

=== ¡Cholita! The Female Menudo ===
- ¡No Controles! (1987)
- Chicas De Hoy (1989)
- ¡Cholita! (1996)

=== Pedro, Muriel & Esther ===
- PME (1991)
- The White to Be Angry (1998)

=== Solo ===
- Small Whyte House (Vaginal Davis and Robespierre) (1994)

=== Other appearances ===
Title	Year	Album	Role
"Well, Well, Well" (Le Tigre featuring Vaginal Davis)	2004	Feminist Sweepstakes	Sounds of Ecstasy
"I Could Have Sex" (Technova featuring Vaginal Davis)	2004	Electrosexual	—
"Mama's Not Dead" (Technova featuring Vaginal Davis)	2004	Electrosexual	—
"My Pussy is a Cactus" (Technova featuring Vaginal Davis)	2004	Electrosexual	—
"Mangina" (Technova featuring Vaginal Davis)	2004	Electrosexual	—
"Bitterest Pill" (Technova featuring Vaginal Davis)	2004	Electrosexual	—
"Girls Like Us" (The Julie Ruin featuring Vaginal Davis)	2012	Non-album single	—
"Faith, Torn Apart" (Xiu Xiu featuring Vaginal Davis)	2017	FORGET	—

== Filmography ==
=== Film ===
Year	Title	Role	Notes
1987	A Doll's House		
1988	I, Vaginal		
1991	The Devil's Daughter		
1994	Dot	Dorothy Parker	
1994	Designy Living		
1994	Three Faces of Women		Director- Rick Castro
1995	Super 8½		
1995	Live Nude Girls	Pool Man	
1996	Hustler White	Buster Boote	
1998	Hallelujah! Ron Athey: A Story of Deliverance	Herself	
1999	The White To Be Angry		Director; short film
1999	Can I Be Your Bratwurst, Please?		Director; short film
2001	The Other Newest One		Director; short film
2001	Le Petite Tonkinoise		Director; short film
2001	Fra unter Einfluss		Director; short film
2005	Beyond Lovely	Bruce B.	Short film
2006	The Pikme-Up	Herself	
2008	The Lollipop Generation	Beulah Blacktress	
2010	The Dream of Norma	Norma	Short film
2010	The Bad Breast; or, The Strange Case of Theda Strange		Short film
2010	Teddy´s Beastiary. Letters to the Parents	Th.W. Adorno, his aunt	Dir. Bear Boy (short)
2011	The Advocate for Fagdom	Herself	
2012	Rosas Welt – 70 neue Filme von Rosa von Praunheim	Marta Feuchtwanger	
2012	She Said Boom: The Story of Fifth Column	Herself	
2012	Hippo Narcissus	Th.W.Adorno	Dir. Bear Boy (short)

=== Television ===
Year	Title	Role	Notes
1993	Tales of the City	Endup Emcee	
2001	Gideon's Crossing	Eddie	Episode 9: "Is There a Wise Man in the House?"

== Zine-ography ==
- Dowager (1972-1975)
- Crude (1976-1980)
- Fertile La Toya Jackson (1982-1991)
- Shrimp (1993)
- Yes, Ms. Davis (1994)
- Sucker (1995-1997)
- Dragazine (1997)

== Other ==
Davis’s name appears in the lyrics of the Le Tigre song "Hot Topic."

== Sources ==
- José Muñoz, Disidentifications: Queers of Color and the Performance of Politics (Minneapolis: University of Minnesota Press, 1999) ISBN 0-8166-3015-1
- Jennifer Doyle, Sex Objects: Art and the Dialectics of Desire (Minneapolis: University of Minnesota Press, 2006). ISBN 0-8166-4526-4
