= Barcelona Pavilion (band) =

Canadian indie pop band

The Barcelona Pavilion
- Origin: Toronto, Ontario, Canada
- Genres: Indie pop
- Years active: 2001-2005
- Labels: Blocks Recording Club, Meccico Records
- Members: Kat Gligorijevic; Ben Stimpson; Steven Kado; Maggie MacDonald; Vanessa Fischer

The Barcelona Pavilion (a.k.a. Barcelona Pavilion) was an indie pop band from Toronto, Ontario, known for their lively dance-friendly music.

== History ==
Taking their name from the early modernist structure in Barcelona, Barcelona Pavilion formed in 2001 and, in 2002, independently released a two-track CDr, titled The Barcelona Pavilion. They were then signed to Meccico Records and, in 2002, Blocks Recording Club released the EP It's The Barcelona Pavilion!. Some of its five songs received airplay on local radio in 2003, In 2005, they released the four track mini-disk It's Because of the Barcelona Pavilion.

The band were described by NOW in 2003 as "the best new band in Toronto", and were strongly associated with the Torontopia scene of the era. That year they also recorded a radio session for BBC Radio 1 DJ John Peel.

After disbanding in 2005, the group reunited for a one-off performance as a part of the popular Toronto music series Wavelength's 500th showcase on February 14, 2010.

== Discography ==
- The Barcelona Pavilion (Blocks, 2001)
- It's the Barcelona Pavilion (Blocks, 2003)
- It's Because of the Barcelona Pavilion (Blocks, 2005)

Compilations

- Toronto Is The Best!!! Toronto Is Great!!! (Blocks, 2004)
- Colours Are Brighter (Rough Trade, 2006)

== See also ==
- Canadian rock
- List of bands from Canada
- List of Canadian musicians
