= The Story of Harmelodia =

Studio album by Rheostatics
- Released: 1999
- Genre: Indie rock
- Producer: Michael Phillip Wojewoda; Rheostatics

Rheostatics chronology
The Nightlines Sessions (1998)	The Story of Harmelodia (1999)	Night of the Shooting Stars (2001)

Professional ratings
Review scores
Source	Rating
Allmusic	link
Crawdaddy!	favorable link

The Story of Harmelodia is a 1999 album by Rheostatics.

Billed as a children's album, the album is a narrative detailing the adventures of Dot and Bug, two children from the land of Harmelodia who fall through a hole (as in Alice's Adventures in Wonderland) into the land of Popopolis. In Harmelodia, the children attend weekly lessons where they learn highly regimented music, but in Popopolis, they learn to make music using their own creativity on fantastical instruments such as the "wingophone".

The album is based on a story by Dave Bidini, and is packaged in a book containing Bidini's text with illustrations by Martin Tielli. Narration on the album is by Bidini's wife, Janet Morassutti.

A different version of "Song of the Garden" was recorded for the band's 2001 album Night of the Shooting Stars.

Guest musicians on the album include Sarah Harmer, Kurt Swinghammer, Mia Sheard and Kevin Hearn. It is also the only Rheostatics album which includes a songwriting credit for Don Kerr, the band's drummer from 1995 to 2001.

== Other notes ==
In 2004, Centennial Secondary School in Belleville, Ontario created and performed a stage musical version of the album. The show itself did a trial at the legendary Horseshoe Tavern in Toronto.

== Track listing ==
All songs and narration credited to Dave Bidini, except where noted.

1. "The Harmelodian Anthem"
2. "Dot and Bug in the Street"
3. "I Fab Thee" (Martin Tielli)
4. "It's Easy to be With You"
5. "Monkeybird" (Kevin Hearn)
6. "The Descent into Popopolis"
7. "Invisible Stairs" (Tim Vesely)
8. "Popopolis"
9. "I Am Drumstein"
10. "The Music Room" (Vesely)
11. "Dot Tries the Wingophone" (Hearn)
12. "Wingophone" (Hearn)
13. "Bug's Song (The Sky Dreamed)"
14. "Loving Arms" (Vesely)
15. "Father Mourns, Drumstein Schemes"
16. "The Bee Sky Opus in Magenta (Dr. Drumstein)"
17. "Father's Sad Song" (Don Kerr, Gordon Downie)
18. "Home Again" (Tielli)
19. "Dot and Bug Pop out of the Earth"
20. "Song of the Garden" (Dave Merritt, Mike Bonnell)
