= Andrea Nann =

Canadian dancer (born 1966)

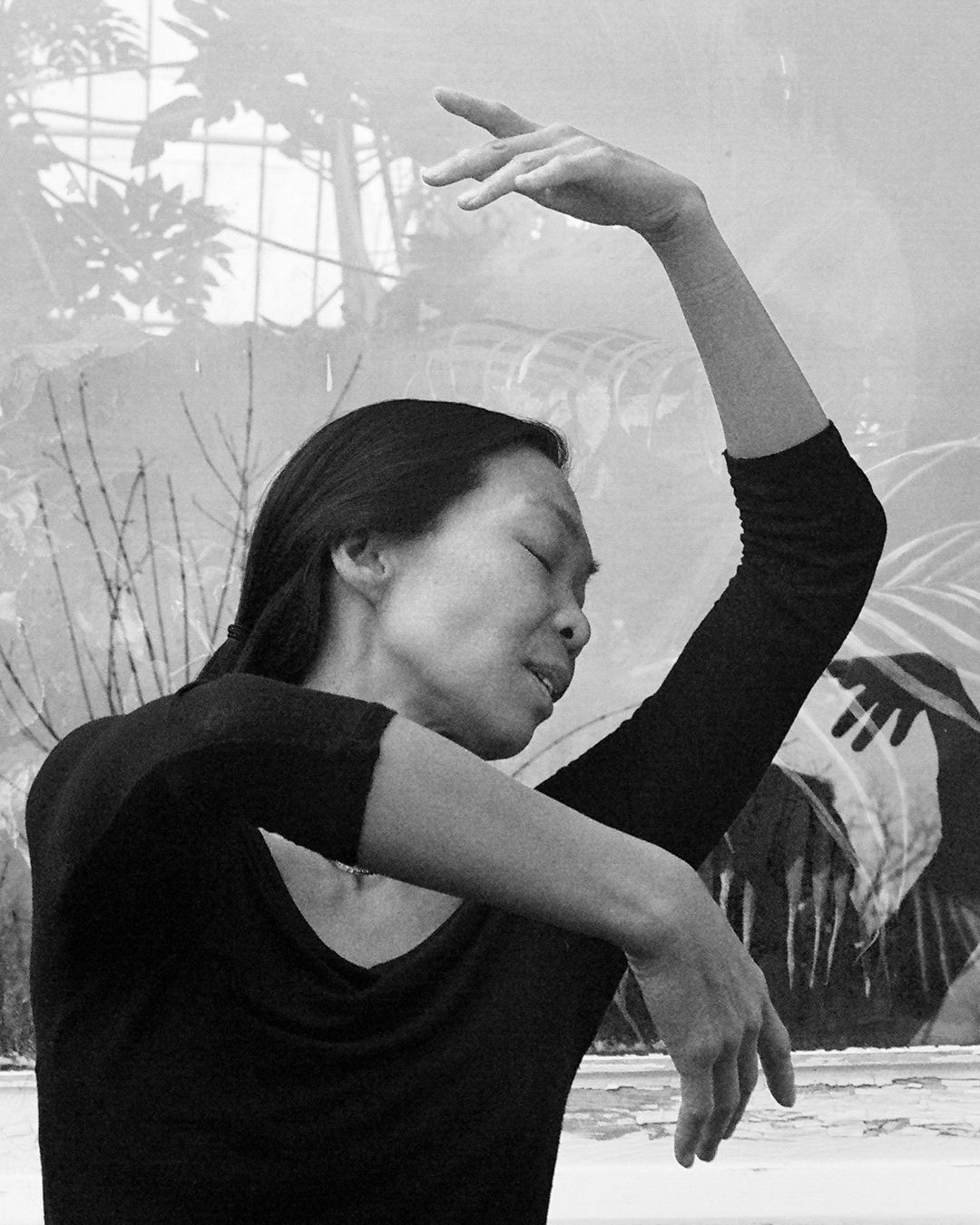
Andrea in 2019.

Andrea Nann (20 September, 1966) is a Canadian dancer, choreographer, dance educator, and artistic director. Born in Vancouver, she became interested in exploring and expressing human emotions through dance from a young age. Nann trained with several prominent Canadian dance artists, most notably Danny Grossman.

== Career ==
Andrea Nann worked with a diverse range of dance artists throughout her career, including Peggy Baker, Tedd Robinson, Rachel Browne, Peter Chin, Kate Alton, Patricia Beatty, Terrill Maguire and Michelle Silagy.

Nann completed a special honours BFA in dance at York University in 1988. In the same year, she joined Danny Grossman Dance Company. Nann toured with the company across Canada, the US and Cuba until 2003.

In 2005, Nann founded the Andrea Nann Dreamwalker Dance Company in Toronto.

Nann collaborated with poet and songwriter Gord Downie on Reveries (2001), Divination Duets (2009) and Beside Each Other (2010). She has also worked on film and television projects such as Brian Johnson's Tell Me Everything (2006), Nicole Mion's That Thing Between Us (2006), and Veronica Tennant's Shadow Pleasures (2004).

Nann has been awarded grants by the Canada Council, Ontario Arts Council and Toronto Arts Council.
