= Mississauga Goddam =

Studio album by the Hidden Cameras
- Released: October 12, 2004
- Recorded: 2004
- Genre: Indie rock
- Length: 40:48
- Label: Rough Trade/EvilEvil
- Producer: Joel Gibb

The Hidden Cameras chronology
The CBC Sessions (2003)	Mississauga Goddam (2004)	The arms of his 'ill' (2004)

Professional ratings
Review scores
Source	Rating
AllMusic	3.5/5 stars
Pitchfork	5.8/10

Mississauga Goddam is a 2004 album by the Hidden Cameras.

The title is an allusion to Nina Simone's civil rights anthem "Mississippi Goddam" (from the album Nina Simone in Concert), suggesting suburbia (Mississauga is a suburb of Toronto) as the real battleground for LGBT equality.

The album was released on Rough Trade Records in the United Kingdom and EvilEvil in Canada.

A video for the title "I Believe in the Good of Life", was released. Directed by Joel Gibb, starred band members Joel Gibb, Maggie MacDonald, Mike e.b., Lex Vaughn, Owen Pallett, and others, along with guest stars Tawny LeSabre, Keith Cole, Will Munro, and G.B. Jones.

== Track listing ==
1. "Doot Doot Plot" – 2:47
2. "Builds the Bone" – 3:40
3. "The Fear Is On" – 2:41
4. "That's When the Ceremony Starts" – 3:07
5. "I Believe in the Good of Life" – 3:33
6. "In the Union of Wine" – 4:43
7. "Music Is My Boyfriend" – 3:28
8. "Bboy" – 2:38
9. "We Oh We" – 4:32
10. "I Want Another Enema" – 3:55
11. "Mississauga Goddam" – 5:44

== Personnel ==
- Joel Gibb - Producer, vocals, guitar, drums, bass, glockenspiel, piano, tambourine, organ, kazoo, vibraphone, synthesizer, steel drum, aeuwwgha, artwork, photos
- Ohad Benchetrit - flute
- Mike e.b. - tambourine
- Jameson Elliot - assistant engineer
- Scott Good - trombone
- Luis Jacob - aeuwwgha
- Nana Jojura - violin
- Don Kerr - cello
- Amy Laing - cello
- Jeff McMurrich - recording engineer
- Maggie MacDonald - glockenspiel, vibraphone
- Paul Mathew - double bass
- Karen Moffat - viola
- Lief Mosbaugh - viola
- Kristen Moss - harp
- Mike Olson - cello
- Owen Pallett - violin, piano, celeste
- Matais Rozenberg - spoons, percussion, drums, bass keys
- Jennifer Scofield - French horn
- Phil Seguin - trumpet
- Justin Shayshyn - B4 Hammond organ, pipe organ
- Lex Vaughn - maraca drums, timpani, drums
- Choir - Caroline Azar, Amy Bowles, Kate McGee, Glen Sheppard, Megan Dunlop, Tom Lillington, Michael Follert, Reg Vermue
