= Republic of Safety =

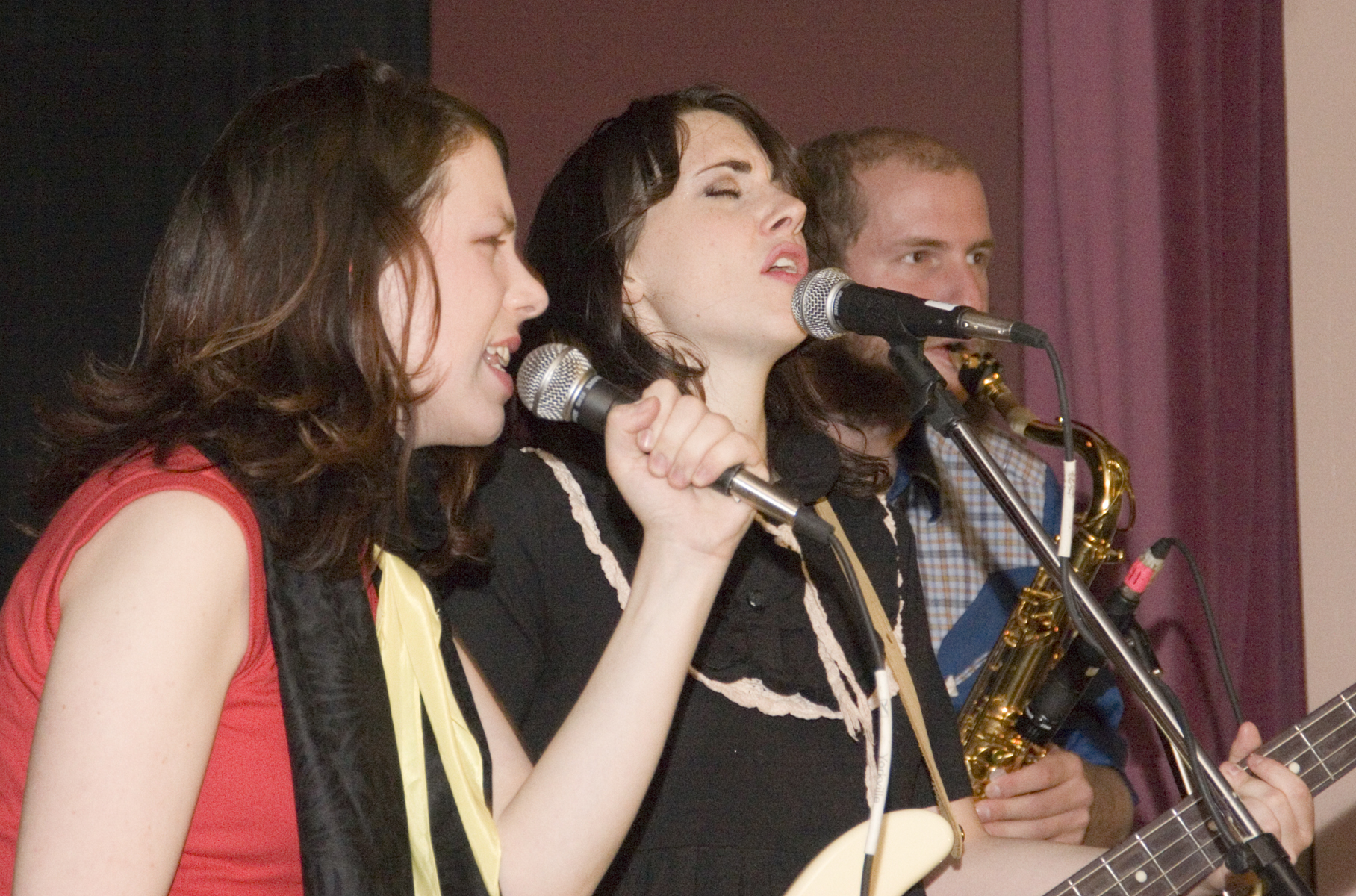
- Republic of Safety, November 2007

Background information
- Origin: Toronto, Ontario, Canada
- Genres: Indie rock
- Years active: 2005–2008
- Labels: Sonic Unyon (2005); Ta Da! (2006)
- Past members: Maggie MacDonald; Kat Gligorijevic; Kate McGee; Evan Davies; Jonny Dovercourt; Marlena Kaesler; Steve Sidoli; Martin Eckart
- Website: Republic of Safety

Republic of Safety was a Canadian indie rock band from Toronto, Ontario, known for including political content in their performances and recordings.

== History ==
Republic of Safety was formed in 2005. The original members were vocalist Maggie MacDonald, guitarist Jonny Dovercourt, bassists Kat Gligorijevic and Kate McGee, and drummer Evan Davies. The final lineup featured MacDonald and Dovercourt with Marlena Kaesler, a vocalist, bass and guitar player from Caledonia, Ontario, Steve Sidoli (drums), and Martin Eckart (saxophone).

The band's first EP, Passport, was released on Sonic Unyon Records in 2005, and their follow-up release, Vacation came out on Ta Da! Records in 2006. The latter release included guest appearances by Owen Pallett and Reg Vermue, and was produced by Don Pyle. Both EPs received airplay on Canadian campus radio and CBC Radio 3.

Citing creative differences and day jobs, the band ended as of early 2008. Their final gig on January 26, 2008, also doubled as a release for their third and final EP entitled Succession.

== Band members ==
- Maggie MacDonald
- Kat Gligorijevic
- Kate McGee
- Evan Davies
- Jonny Dovercourt
- Marlena Kaesler
- Martin Eckart

== Discography ==
=== EPs ===
- Passport (2005)
- Vacation (2006)
- Succession (2008)
