= Awoo =

AWOO

Studio album by the Hidden Cameras
- Released: September 4, 2006
- Recorded: August 3 – December 8, 2005, Toronto Island
- Genre: Indie pop
- Length: 44:03
- Labels: Rough Trade, Arts & Crafts
- Producer: Joel Gibb

The Hidden Cameras chronology
The arms of his 'ill' (2004)	AWOO (2006)	Origin:Orphan (2009)

Professional ratings
Review scores
Source	Rating
AllMusic	4/5 stars
Drowned in Sound	8/10
The Music Box	2/5 stars
Pitchfork	5.6/10
PopMatters	5/10
Stylus	B

AWOO is the fourth studio album by the Hidden Cameras, released on September 4, 2006 in the United Kingdom, and September 19, 2006 in the United States.

The album was released on EvilEvil in Canada in August. It was released on September 4 on Rough Trade in the UK and was also released on Arts & Crafts in the United States on September 19.

== Track listing ==
1. "Death of a Tune" (2:43)
2. "AWOO" (2:44)
3. "She's Gone" (3:39)
4. "Lollipop" (3:13)
5. "Fee Fie" (3:27)
6. "Learning the Lie" (2:18)
7. "Follow These Eyes" (4:22)
8. "Heji" (2:37)
9. "Heaven Turns To" (3:36)
10. "Wandering" (2:46)
11. "For Fun" (5:07)
12. "Hump From Bending" (3:10)
13. "The WAning mOOn" (4:29)
