= The Hidden Cameras =

Canadian indie pop band

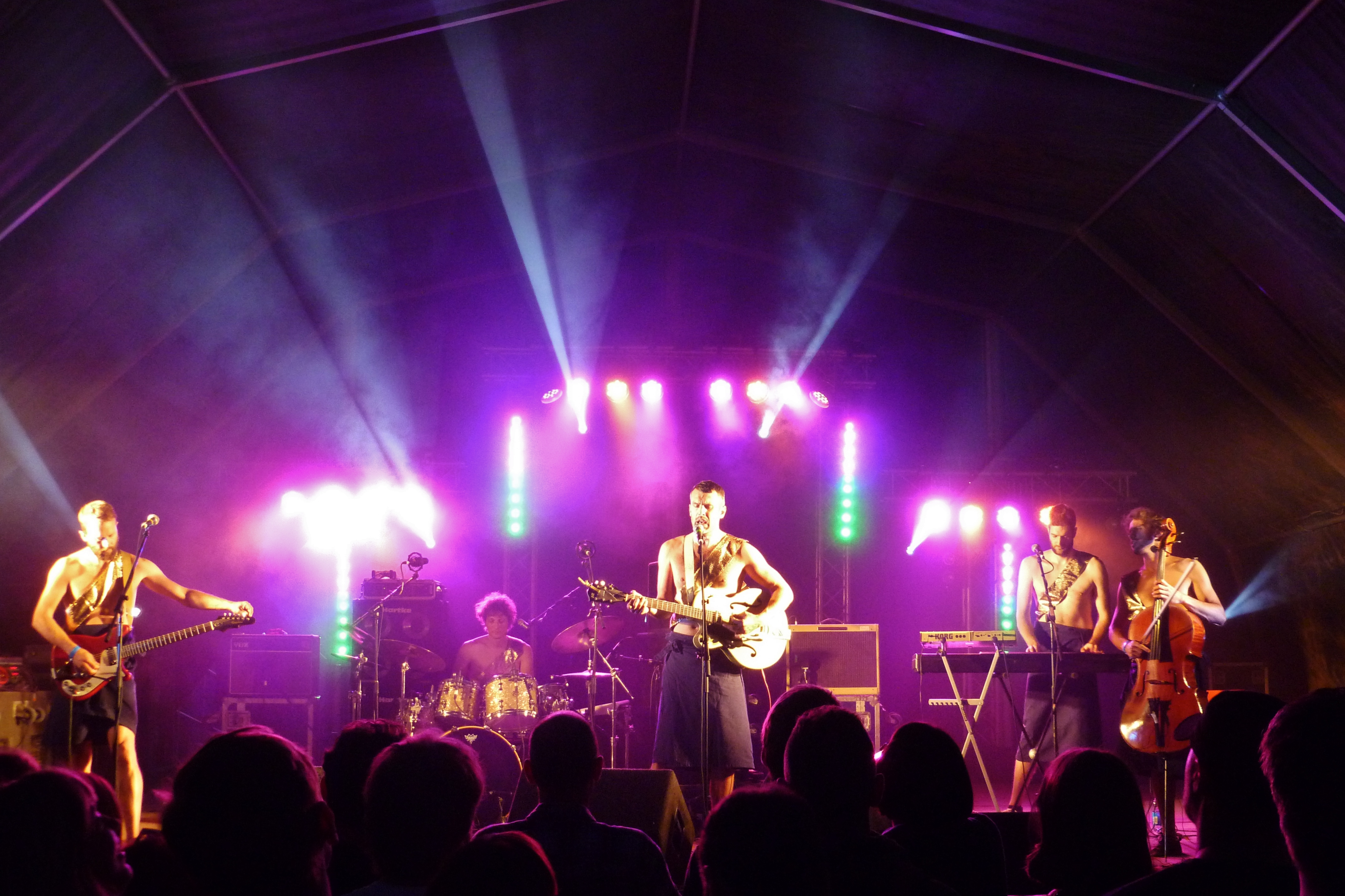
- The Hidden Cameras performing at Indietracks 2014

Background information
- Origin: Toronto, Ontario, Canada
- Genres: Indie pop, indie rock, alternative rock, baroque pop, queercore
- Years active: 2001–present
- Labels: Arts & Crafts, Outside Music, Rough Trade
- Members: Joel Gibb; Laura Barrett; Maggie MacDonald; Michael Peter Olsen; Lief Mosbaugh; Shaun Brodie; Paul Mathew; Rudolf Hebenstreit; Jamie McCarthy; John Power; Mez
- Website: thehiddencameras.com

The Hidden Cameras is a Canadian indie pop band. Fronted by singer-songwriter Joel Gibb, the band consists of a varying roster of musicians who play what Gibb once described as "gay church folk music". Their live performances have been elaborate, high-energy shows, featuring go-go dancers in balaclavas, a choir, and a string section.

== History ==
=== 2001–2002: Ecce Homo ===
The band's first album, Ecce Homo, was released independently in 2001 on EvilEvil. It was after this first release that Gibb assembled a band and they began to perform in venues varying from art galleries to churches to porn theatres to parks. Since these early days the Hidden Cameras have played host to a number of notable musicians, including Reg Vermue, Owen Pallett, Laura Barrett, Don Kerr, Magali Meagher (of the Phonemes), Mike Olsen (of the Arcade Fire), and Maggie MacDonald.

=== 2003: The Smell of Our Own ===
Their 2003 album The Smell of Our Own was released through Rough Trade in the UK and on the independent label EvilEvil in Canada.

=== 2004–2005: Mississauga Goddam and The Arms of His 'Ill' ===
In 2004, they released Mississauga Goddam on Rough Trade and on EvilEvil in Canada. Their EP The Arms of His 'Ill' was released by Absolutely Kosher Records in the same year, and it features jacket art created by Paul P. and G.B. Jones. In November 2005, the band collaborated with Toronto Dance Theatre on the show In the Boneyard at the Harbourfront Centre in Toronto. Dancers joined the band throughout the show and played instruments, and the band performed on-stage in costume.

Three of the songs from Mississauga Goddam ("We Oh We", "I Believe in the Good of Life" (a rerecorded version of the same song from the first album), and "Builds the Bone") are featured in the Canadian movie Whole New Thing. "We Oh We" is featured on the soundtrack of the German film Sommersturm (Summer Storm).

=== 2006: Awoo ===
Awoo, their 2006 recording, was released on Rough Trade in Europe, EvilEvil in Canada, and in the U.S. on Arts & Crafts. The Hidden Cameras' song "Boys of Melody" is featured on the soundtrack of the John Cameron Mitchell film Shortbus. The Hidden Cameras song "Lollipop" is the theme song for the G.B. Jones film The Lollipop Generation from 2008, on which Joel Gibb also appears.

=== 2009: Origin:Orphan ===
Origin:Orphan, their fifth album, was mastered in May 2009. The music video for "In the NA", a song from this album, was screened at the 19th Annual Inside Out Film and Video Festival. The album was released on 22 September 2009.

Five songs from Origin:Orphan were redone by electronic pop band from Barcelona Hidrogenesse and released under the name of Hidrogenesse versus the Hidden Cameras in May 2010. Also a video for "He Falls to Me" was done by Darío Peña.

In 2011, they recorded a cover of Mecca Normal's "Throw Silver" for the compilation album Have Not Been the Same - Vol. 1: Too Cool to Live, Too Smart to Die.

=== 2013: Arts & Crafts compilations and Age ===
In 2013, the band appeared on two compilation albums from the label Arts & Crafts. The song "Mind, Matter and Waste", originally a B-side from their 2009 "In the NA" single, appeared on Arts & Crafts: 2003-2013 and garnered airplay on CBC Radio 3, and the band collaborated with Snowblink on a cover of Duran Duran's "The Chauffeur" for Arts & Crafts: X.

The album Age was released in January 2014. The lead single "Gay Goth Scene" was released in July 2013. The video for the single was directed by Kai Stänicke, who received the Short Film Award for Human Rights at San Marino International Film Festival awards, Tadgell’s Bluebell Honor Award, Best Short Film About/For Youth at the 16th Auburn International Film Festival for Children and Young Adults in Sydney, Australia, and best German short at the International Queer Film Festival Hamburg, Germany.

=== 2016: Home on Native Land ===
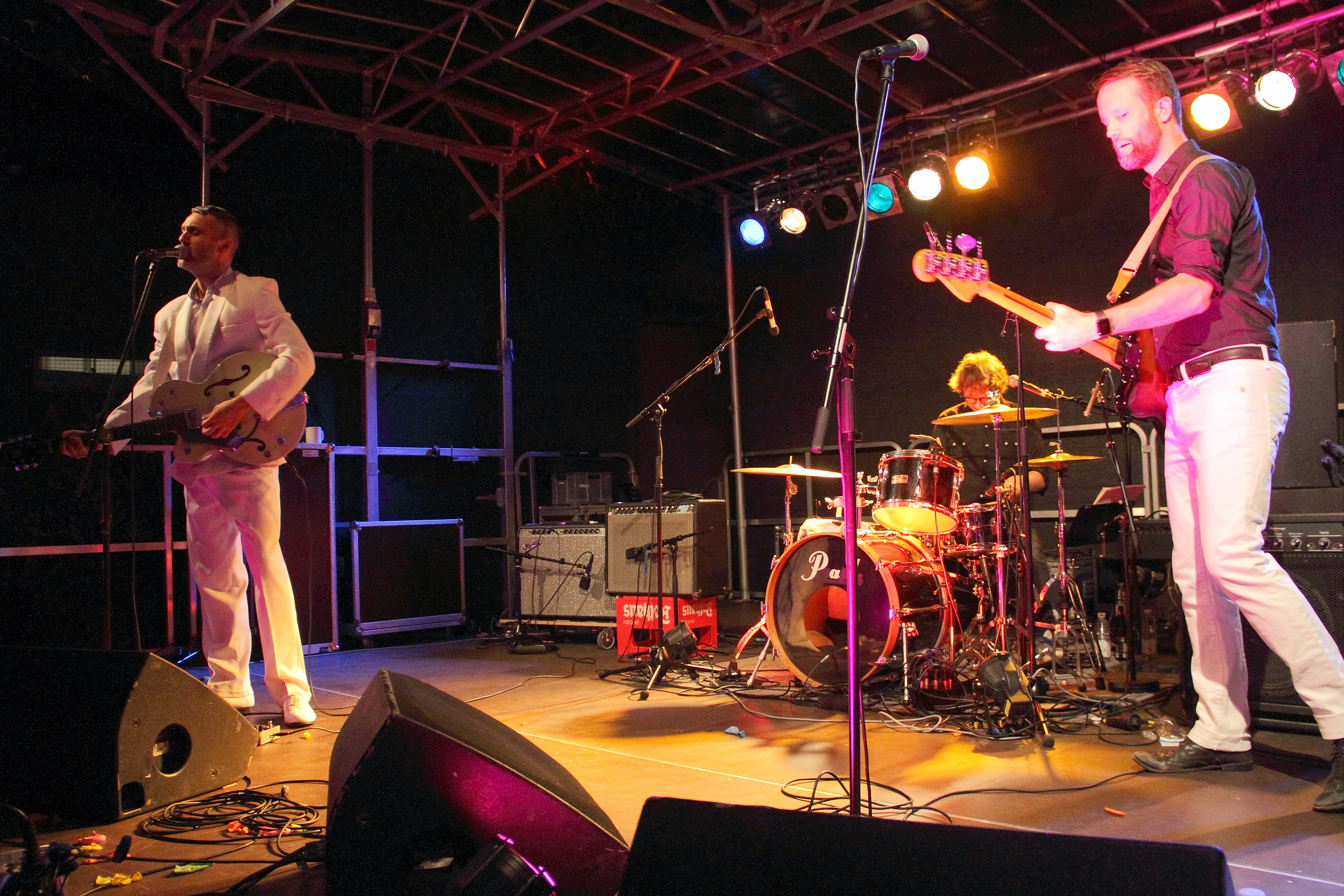
Manufaktur Schorndorf, Germany 2018

Home on Native Land released on Outside Music was written and recorded over 10 years by Gibb with friends and bandmates, including Rufus Wainwright, Feist, Neil Tennant, Bahamas, Ron Sexsmith, and Mary Margaret O’Hara.

== Discography ==
The band's material has been released on a variety of labels, including Rough Trade in the United Kingdom, Arts & Crafts in the U.S., and Outside Music in Canada.

=== Albums ===
- Ecce Homo (2001)
- The Smell of Our Own (2003)
- Mississauga Goddam (2004)
- Awoo (2006)
- Origin:Orphan (2009)
- Age (2014)
- Home on Native Land (2016)
- Bronto (2025)

=== EPs ===
- The Hidden Cameras Play the CBC Sessions (2003)
- The Arms of His 'Ill (2004)
- How Do You Love? (2025)

=== Singles ===
- "Ban Marriage" (2003)
- "A Miracle" (2003) #70 UK
- "I Believe in the Good of Life" (2004)
- "Learning the Lie" (double single release)(2005)
- "Death of a Tune" (2006)
- "Awoo" (2006)
- "In the NA" (2009)
- "Underage" (2010)
- "Do I Belong?" (2011)
- "Mind, Matter and Waste" (2013)
- "Gay Goth Scene" (2013)
- "Carpe Jugular" (2014)
- "Doom" (2014)
- "The Day I Left Home" (2016)
- "How Do You Love?" (2025)
- "Undertow" (2025)
- "Quantify" (2025)

=== Soundtracks ===
- Rebels Rule, directed by Will Munro, 2002
- Sommersturm, directed by Marco Kreuzpaintner, 2004
- Shortbus, directed by John Cameron Mitchell, 2006
- Whole New Thing, directed by Amnon Buchbinder and co-written by Daniel MacIvor, 2006
- Small Town Gay Bar, directed by Malcolm Ingram, 2006
- The Lollipop Generation, directed by G.B. Jones, 2008
