= Paul P. =

Canadian painter, sculptor, collagist and graphic artist

- Born: 1977 (age 48–49); Hamilton, Ontario, Canada
- Education: York University, Toronto
- Known for: painter, sculptor, collagist, graphic artist

Paul P. (born 1977) is a Canadian artist known for his work as a painter, sculptor, collagist and graphic artist exploring identity, gender, art history and landscape. He lives and works in Toronto, Ontario.

== Career ==
Paul P. was born in Hamilton, Ontario and grew up in Toronto. He graduated in 2000 with a BFA from York University in Toronto. He began using only initial of his last name while still a student to single him out from other artists.

== Work ==
Paul P's early work which he described as "melancholic" was drawn from early 80's pre-AIDS era gay pornography, using appropriated photographs from The ArQuives (formerly the Canadian Lesbian and Gay Archives) in Toronto. The New York Times described them as "oddly unsensual".

Later, he might use photographs taken during his travels, or drawings made by him in the out-of-doors which might become a source for paintings. The nuances of light and atmosphere were primary concerns and his work sometimes has been influenced by figures in art history such as James McNeill Whistler and John Singer Sargent. He also has made sculpture as in his installation "Writing Table for Nancy Mitford" at the 2014 Whitney Biennal.

== Selected solo exhibitions ==
Selected solo exhibitions include: Dusks, Lamplights, The Power Plant, Toronto (2007); Slim Volume, Queer Thoughts, New York (2019); Gamboling Green, Cooper Cole, Toronto (2020); Vespertilians, Maureen Paley, London, England (2022); Friendly in the Knife-edged Moment, Oakville Galleries, Ontario (2022); Early Skirmishes, Hordaland Kunstsenter, Bergen, Norway (2022); and Paul P.: Amor et Mors, National Gallery of Canada (2023), curated by Sonia Del Re, senior curator of Prints and Drawings, of a group of 30 works acquired by the collection in 2020 created by Paul P. between 2003 and 2019, along with about 15 works from the collection.

== Selected group exhibitions ==
- Crack the Sky: Biennale de Montréal, Montreal (2007);
- Compass in Hand, Museum of Modern Art, New York (2009);
- Whitney Biennial, Whitney Museum of American Art, New York (2014);
- Front International, Cleveland Triennial for Contemporary Art, Cleveland (2018);
- Houseguest: Shadows Fall Down, Hammer Museum, Los Angeles (2021)

== Publications ==
Doe Ye Nexte Thynge, 2013
Last Flowers, Invisible Exports/Downtown Arts, 2012, text by Daniel Reich, 2012
The Radiant Guest (Paul P. and Scott Treleaven), Publication Studios, Toronto, 2011
The Pink Book, Daniel Reich Gallery, 2010, text by Harold Montague
Venice, Venice, Marc Selwyn Fine Art, 2009
Paul P.- When Ghost Meets Ghost / Peter Hujar, Maureen Paley, 2008, text by Vince Aletti
Blue and Silver, Galerie Thaddaeus Ropac, 2007, text by Francois Jonquet
Nonchaloir, Powerhouse books, 2007, text by Collier Schorr
Places Names, the Place, Daniel Reich Gallery, 2007, text by David Velasco
The Yellow Room, Marc Selwyn Fine Art, 2006, text by Vince Aletti
Grey and Gold, Galerie Thaddaeus Ropac, 2005, text by Michel Bulteau

== Collections ==
- The Speed Art Museum, Louisville, Kentucky
- Princeton University Art Museum, Princeton
- Museum of Art Rhode Island School of Art, Providence
- Museum of Modern Art, New York
- Glenbow Museum, Calgary Alberta
- Brooklyn Museum, Brooklyn
- Art Gallery of Ontario, Toronto
- National Gallery of Canada, Ottawa
- Whitney Museum of American Art, New York
- Hammer Museum, Los Angeles
