= Origin:Orphan =

Studio album by the Hidden Cameras
- Released: September 22, 2009
- Genre: Indie rock
- Label: Arts & Crafts

The Hidden Cameras chronology
| Awoo (2006) | Origin:Orphan (2009) | Age (2014) |

Origin:Orphan is the fifth studio album by the Hidden Cameras, released September 22, 2009. It is the band's first release on Arts & Crafts.

The album's first official single is "In the NA", although the song "Walk On" was previously released as a preview track on the web and the compilation album Arts & Crafts Sampler Vol. 6. The music video for "In the NA" was screened at several film festivals, including the 19th Annual Inside Out Film and Video Festival, the opening night of SXSW and the 2008 Atlantic Film Festival.

== Reception ==
Professional ratings
Aggregate scores
| Source | Rating |
|---|---|
| Metacritic | 81/100 |
Review scores
| Source | Rating |
| AllMusic | 3.5/5 stars |
| The A.V. Club | B |
| Cokemachineglow | 79% |
| The Guardian | 5/5 stars |
| Mojo | 4/5 stars |
| musicOMH | 5/5 stars |
| NME | 9/10 |
| Pitchfork | 5.2/10 |
| Q | 4/5 stars |
| PopMatters | 8/10 |

Dave Simpson of The Guardian drew comparisons to bands including Dead Can Dance, the Buggles and OMD, observing "a killer mature album". He concluded, "Origin: Orphan has a similar tour-de-force feel to the first Arcade Fire album: the sound of loneliness and heartbreak gift-wrapped in bundles of sonic joy."

== Track listing ==
1. "Ratify the New" – 6:31
2. "In the NA" – 4:20
3. "He Falls to Me" – 4:09
4. "Colour of a Man" – 4:48
5. "Do I Belong?" – 4:12
6. "Walk On" – 4:42
7. "Kingdom Come" – 3:10
8. "Origin:Orphan" – 5:21
9. "Underage" – 2:50
10. "The Little Bit" – 2:38
11. "Silence Can Be a Headline" – 5:17
