= 2012 in Canadian music =

This is a summary of the year 2012 in the Canadian music industry.

== Events ==
- February 13 – The Canadian Broadcasting Corporation launches CBC Music, a digital music service which offers streaming audio broadcasts of 40 different music genre channels, in addition to the existing CBC Radio 2 and CBC Radio 3 services, on both the Internet and iOS devices.
- April 1 – Juno Awards of 2012
- June 14 – Prelimimary longlist for the 2012 Polaris Music Prize is announced.
- July 17 – Shortlist for the 2012 Polaris Music Prize is announced.
- September 24 – Feist's album Metals is announced as the winner of the Polaris Music Prize.

== Bands on hiatus ==
- Karkwa

== Albums released ==
=== A ===
- Amos the Transparent, Goodnight My Dear, I'm Falling Apart (February 14)
- Amylie, Le Royaume
- Androgynous Mind, Nightstalker
- Apollo Ghosts, Landmark
- Marie-Pierre Arthur, Aux alentours
- Azari & III, Azari & III

=== B ===
- Baby Eagle and the Proud Mothers, Bone Soldier (March 6)
- Bahamas, Barchords (February 7)
- Del Barber, Headwaters
- Bidiniband, In the Rock Hall (January 24)
- Justin Bieber, Believe
- Big Brave, An Understanding Between People
- Billy Talent, Dead Silence, September 9, 2012
- The Birthday Massacre, Hide and Seek (October 9)
- Blue Moon Marquee, Stainless Steel Heart
- Boxer the Horse, French Residency
- Brasstronaut, Mean Sun (May 15)

=== C ===
- Cadence Weapon, Hope in Dirt City (May 29)
- Cancer Bats, Dead Set on Living
- Caracol, Shiver
- Paul Cargnello, Papa Paul
- Change of Heart, There You Go '82 – '97 (September 18, 2012)
- Tim Chaisson, The Other Side (September 25)
- The City Streets, White Lightning (spring)
- The City Streets, Sawdust & Rum (spring)
- Leonard Cohen, Old Ideas (January 31)
- Cold Specks, I Predict a Graceful Expulsion (May 21)
- Cookie Duster, When Flying Was Easy (June)
- Ève Cournoyer, Le labeur d'une fleur
- Rose Cousins, We Have Made a Spark
- Devin Cuddy, Volume One
- Cuff the Duke, In Our Time (April 12)
- Cuff the Duke, Union (October 2)
- Amelia Curran, Spectators (October 2)

=== D ===
- The Damn Truth, Dear in the Headlights
- Daphni, Jiaolong
- Diamond Rings, Free Dimensional
- Digawolf, Naka De
- Céline Dion, Sans attendre
- Julie Doiron, So Many Days (October 23)
- Dumas, L'Heure et l'endroit
- Durham County Poets, Where the River Flows
- Dusted, Dusted

=== E ===
- Kathleen Edwards, Voyageur (January 17)
- Coral Egan, The Year He Drove Me Crazy
- The Elwins, And I Thank You (February 21)
- Quique Escamilla, Quique Escamilla
- Esthero, Everything Is Expensive (October 30)
- Evening Hymns, Spectral Dusk

=== F ===
- Jeremy Fisher, Mint Juleps
- Front Line Assembly, AirMech (November 13)
- Nelly Furtado, The Spirit Indestructible (September 18)

=== G ===
- Gentleman Reg, Leisure Life
- Hannah Georgas, Hannah Georgas
- Ghostkeeper, Horse Chief! War Thief!
- Jenn Grant, The Beautiful Wild (September 25)
- Great Bloomers, Distant Fires
- Great Lake Swimmers, New Wild Everywhere (April 3)
- Grey Kingdom, The Weeping Suns; Light, I'll Call Your Name Out "Darkness"
- Grimes, Visions (February 21)
- Godspeed You! Black Emperor, 'Allelujah! Don't Bend! Ascend! (October 1)

=== H ===
- Hot Panda, Go Outside
- Joshua Hyslop, Where the Mountain Meets the Valley

=== I ===
- Islands, A Sleep & a Forgetting (February 14)

=== J ===
- JBM, Stray Ashes
- Japandroids, Celebration Rock
- Carly Rae Jepsen, Curiosity
- Carly Rae Jepsen, Kiss
- July Talk, July Talk

=== K ===
- Kalle Mattson, Lives in Between
- Karkwa, Karkwa Live
- Peter Katz, Still Mind Still
- Mo Kenney, Mo Kenney
- Kid Koala, 12 Bit Blues, (September 18)
- Keith Kouna, Du plaisir et des bombes
- K'naan, Country, God or the Girl, (October 16)
- K'naan, More Beautiful Than Silence (January 31)
- Kristina Maria, Tell the World

=== L ===
- Zachary Lucky, Saskatchewan

=== M ===
- Madison Violet, The Good in Goodbye
- Maestro Fresh Wes, Black Tuxedo EP (September 18)
- Maïa, Héritage
- Mares of Thrace, The Pilgrimage
- Carolyn Mark, The Queen of Vancouver Island
- Masia One, Bootleg Culture (June 19)
- Matt Mays, Coyote
- Eamon McGrath, Young Canadians
- Loreena McKennitt, Troubadours on the Rhine
- Holly McNarland, Run Body Run
- Memoryhouse, The Slideshow Effect (February 28)
- Metric, Synthetica (June 12)
- METZ, METZ
- Millimetrik, Read Between the Rhymes
- Ariane Moffatt, MA
- Mother Mother, The Sticks

=== N ===
- Northern Haze, Sinaaktuq

=== O ===
- Mike O'Neill, Wild Lines
- Octoberman, Waiting in the Well
- Ohbijou, Metal Meets
- Karim Ouellet, Fox
- Our Lady Peace, Curve (April 3)

=== P ===
- Dorothea Paas, Same Sun
- Doug Paisley, Golden Embers
- Parlovr, Kook Soul
- Pascale Picard Band, Trauma: Chansons de la série télé Saison 3
- Dany Placard, Démon vert
- Plants and Animals, The End of That (February 28)
- Joel Plaskett, Scrappy Happiness (March 27)
- Chad Price, In This Dream
- PS I Love You, Death Dreams
- Purity Ring, Shrines

=== R ===
- Radio Radio, Havre de Grace (April 17)
- Rah Rah, The Poet's Dead
- Johnny Reid, Fire It Up
- Rush, Clockwork Angels

=== S ===
- Julien Sagot, Piano mal
- Said the Whale, Little Mountain (March 6)
- John K. Samson, Provincial (January 24)
- Saukrates, Season One (April 24)
- Crystal Shawanda, Just Like You
- Shout Out Out Out Out, Spanish Moss and Total Loss (June 19)
- Zal Sissokho, Le Partage
- Skydiggers, Northern Shore (April 17)
- The Slakadeliqs, The Other Side of Tomorrow
- Smash Brovas, Think It's a Game?
- Dallas Smith, Jumped Right In - May 22
- John Southworth, Failed Jingles for Bank of America and Other Corporations
- Rae Spoon, I Can't Keep All of Our Secrets (January 10)
- Stars, The North
- Jeffery Straker, Vagabond – October 2
- Serena Ryder, Harmony

=== T ===
- The Tragically Hip, Now for Plan A
- A Tribe Called Red, A Tribe Called Red

=== V ===
- Chad VanGaalen, The Green Corridor
- Various Artists, Have Not Been the Same – November 13

=== W ===
- Martha Wainwright, Come Home to Mama
- Rufus Wainwright, Out of the Game
- Patrick Watson, Adventures in Your Own Backyard (April 17)
- Wax Mannequin, No Safe Home
- Whitehorse, The Fate of the World Depends on This Kiss
- Wintersleep, Hello Hum
- Royal Wood, We Were Born to Glory
- The Wooden Sky, Every Child a Daughter, Every Moon a Sun (February 28)
- Woodpigeon, For Paolo
- Wool on Wolves, Measures of Progress

=== Y ===
- Neil Young, Americana
- Yukon Blonde, Tiger Talk – March 20

=== Z ===
- Zeus, Busting Visions

== Top hits on record ==
The lists are updated weekly through Jam! and Nielsen Soundscan.

=== Top 10 Canadian albums ===
Rank	Artist	Album	Peak position	Sales	Certification
1	Celine Dion	Sans attendre	1	209,000	3× Platinum
2	Justin Bieber	Believe	1	179,000	2× Platinum
3	Various Artists	Star Académie 2012	1	156,000	2× Platinum
4	Leonard Cohen	Old Ideas	1	132,000	Platinum
5	Johnny Reid	Fire It Up	2	80,000	Platinum
5	Marie-Mai	Miroir	2	80,000	Platinum
5	Serena Ryder	Harmony	11	80,000	Platinum
5	The Sheepdogs	The Sheepdogs	1	80,000	Platinum
5	The Tenors	Lead With Your Heart	3	80,000	Platinum
5	Various Artists	Star Académie Noël	TBA	80,000	Platinum

=== Top 10 American albums ===
Rank	Artist	Album	Peak position	Sales	Certification
1	Taylor Swift	Red	1	320,000	4× Platinum
2	Bruno Mars	Unorthodox Jukebox	2	240,000	3× Platinum
3	Imagine Dragons	Night Visions	4	240,000	3× Platinum
4	Pink	The Truth About Love	1	240,000	3× Platinum
5	Lana Del Rey	Born to Die	3	160,000	2× Platinum
6	The Lumineers	The Lumineers	5	160,000	2× Platinum
7	Carrie Underwood	Blown Away	1	80,000	Platinum{
8	Florida Georgia Line	Here's to the Good Times	8	80,000	Platinum
9	fun.	Some Nights	5	80,000	Platinum
10	Jack White	Blunderbuss	1	80,000	Platinum

=== Top 10 British albums ===
Rank	Artist	Album	Peak position	Sales	Certification
1	Mumford & Sons	Babel	1	400,000	5× Platinum
2	One Direction	Take Me Home	1	240,000	3× Platinum
3	Rod Stewart	Merry Christmas, Baby	1	240,000	3× Platinum
4	One Direction	Up All Night	1	234,000	3× Platinum
5	Ed Sheeran	+	5	160,000	2× Platinum
6	Led Zeppelin	Celebration Day	4	160,000	2× Platinum
7	Muse	The 2nd Law	2	80,000	Platinum
8	One Direction	Up All Night: The Live Tour	1	60,000	5× Platinum
9	Alt-J	An Awesome Wave	TBA	40,000	Gold
9	Calvin Harris	18 Months	8	40,000	Gold

=== Top 10 International albums ===
Rank	Artist	Album	Peak position	Sales	Certification
1	Of Monsters and Men	My Head Is an Animal	5	160,000	2× Platinum
2	Rihanna	Unapologetic	1	80,000	Platinum
2	Various Artists	2012 Grammy Nominees	TBA	80,000	Platinum
4	Gotye	Making Mirrors	5	40,000	Gold
4	Various Artists	The Hobbit: An Unexpected Journey – Original Motion Picture Soundtrack	TBA	40,000	Gold
4	Various Artists	Rock of Ages: Original Motion Picture Soundtrack	TBA	40,000	Gold
7	Nicki Minaj	Pink Friday: Roman Reloaded	1	17,300	TBA
8	The Cranberries	Roses	6	3,100	TBA
9	Various Artists	Now! 20	2	TBA	TBA
10	Sigur Rós	Valtari	4	TBA	TBA

=== Top 10 Singles ===
Rank	Artist	Song	Album	Peak position	Sales	Certification
1	Carly Rae Jepsen	"Call Me Maybe"	Curiosity & Kiss	1	640,000	8× Platinum
2	Imagine Dragons	"Radioactive"	Night Visions	5	560,000	7× Platinum
3	Macklemore & Ryan Lewis	"Thrift Shop"	The Heist	1	560,000	7× Platinum
4	Maroon 5	"One More Night"	Overexposed	2	480,000	6× Platinum
5	Bruno Mars	"Locked Out of Heaven"	Unorthodox Jukebox	1	400,000	5× Platinum
6	Flo Rida	"Whistle"	Wild Ones	1	400,000	5× Platinum
7	fun.	"Some Nights"	Some Nights	4	400,000	5× Platinum
8	The Lumineers	"Ho Hey"	The Lumineers	2	400,000	5× Platinum
9	Maroon 5 featuring Wiz Khalifa	"Payphone"	Overexposed	1	400,000	5× Platinum
10	Mumford & Sons	"I Will Wait"	Babel	9	400,000	5× Platinum

=== Canadian Hot 100 Year-End List ===
No.	Artist(s)	Title
1	Gotye featuring Kimbra	"Somebody That I Used to Know"
2	Carly Rae Jepsen	"Call Me Maybe"
3	fun. featuring Janelle Monáe	"We Are Young"
4	Maroon 5 featuring Wiz Khalifa	"Payphone"
5	The Wanted	"Glad You Came"
6	Rihanna featuring Calvin Harris	"We Found Love"
7	LMFAO	"Sexy and I Know It"
8	Flo Rida featuring Sia	"Wild Ones"
9	Nicki Minaj	"Starships"
10	Kelly Clarkson	"Stronger (What Doesn't Kill You)"
11	Flo Rida	"Good Feeling"
12	Adele	"Set Fire to the Rain"
13	One Direction	"What Makes You Beautiful"
14	Flo Rida	"Whistle"
15	Train	"Drive By"
16	Katy Perry	"Wide Awake"
17	Maroon 5 featuring Christina Aguilera	"Moves like Jagger"
18	Katy Perry	"Part of Me"
19	Hedley	"Kiss You Inside Out"
20	Katy Perry	"The One That Got Away"
21	David Guetta featuring Usher	"Without You"
22	Simple Plan	"Summer Paradise"
23	David Guetta featuring Sia	"Titanium"
24	Calvin Harris	"Feel So Close"
25	Maroon 5	"One More Night"
26	Rihanna	"Where Have You Been"
27	fun.	"Some Nights"
28	Bruno Mars	"It Will Rain"
29	David Guetta featuring Nicki Minaj	"Turn Me On"
30	Owl City and Carly Rae Jepsen	"Good Time"
31	Jessie J	"Domino"
32	Pitbull	"Back in Time"
33	Pink	"Blow Me (One Last Kiss)"
34	Jennifer Lopez featuring Pitbull	"Dance Again"
35	Justin Bieber	"Boyfriend"
36	Drake featuring Rihanna	"Take Care"
37	Psy	"Gangnam Style"
38	Usher	"Scream"
39	Taylor Swift	"We Are Never Ever Getting Back Together"
40	Pitbull featuring Chris Brown	"International Love"
41	Ellie Goulding	"Lights"
42	Adele	"Someone like You"
43	Snoop Dogg and Wiz Khalifa featuring Bruno Mars	"Young, Wild & Free"
44	Gym Class Heroes featuring Adam Levine	"Stereo Hearts"
45	LMFAO featuring Lauren Bennett and GoonRock	"Party Rock Anthem"
46	Selena Gomez & the Scene	"Love You like a Love Song"
47	Karmin	"Brokenhearted"
48	Justin Bieber featuring Big Sean	"As Long as You Love Me"
49	Victoria Duffield	"Shut Up and Dance"
50	Foster the People	"Pumped Up Kicks"
51	One Direction	"One Thing"
52	K'naan featuring Nelly Furtado	"Is Anybody Out There?"
53	Marianas Trench	"Fallout"
54	Jay-Z and Kanye West	"Niggas in Paris"
55	Carly Rae Jepsen	"Curiosity"
56	Jason Mraz	"I Won't Give Up"
57	Hedley	"One Life"
58	Nicki Minaj	"Pound the Alarm"
59	Adele	"Rumour Has It"
60	Rihanna	"You da One"
61	Adele	"Rolling in the Deep"
62	Marianas Trench	"Desperate Measures"
63	Cher Lloyd	"Want U Back"
64	Mia Martina	"Burning"
65	Danny Fernandes featuring Josh Ramsay and Belly	"Hit Me Up"
66	Calvin Harris featuring Ne-Yo	"Let's Go"
67	Demi Lovato	"Give Your Heart a Break"
68	Chris Brown	"Turn Up the Music"
69	Rihanna	"Diamonds"
70	K'naan	"Hurt Me Tomorrow"
71	The Wanted	"Chasing the Sun"
72	Drake featuring Lil Wayne	"The Motto"
73	Dragonette	"Let It Go"
74	Skrillex featuring Sirah	"Bangarang"
75	deadmau5 featuring Chris James	"The Veldt"
76	Madonna featuring Nicki Minaj and M.I.A.	"Give Me All Your Luvin'"
77	Taio Cruz featuring Flo Rida	"Hangover"
78	will.i.am featuring Mick Jagger and Jennifer Lopez	"T.H.E. (The Hardest Ever)"
79	Gavin DeGraw	"Not Over You"
80	Coldplay	"Paradise"
81	Nickelback	"When We Stand Together"
82	Kelly Clarkson	"Mr. Know It All"
83	Gym Class Heroes featuring Neon Hitch	"Ass Back Home"
84	Lady Gaga	"Marry the Night"
85	Far East Movement featuring Justin Bieber	"Live My Life"
86	Train	"50 Ways to Say Goodbye"
87	T-Pain featuring Wiz Khalifa and Lily Allen	"5 O'Clock"
88	Eric Church	"Springsteen"
89	Toby Keith	"Red Solo Cup"
90	Carrie Underwood	"Good Girl"
91	LMFAO	"Sorry for Party Rocking"
92	Michel Teló	"Ai Se Eu Te Pego"
93	Kesha	"Die Young"
94	Karl Wolf	"Mash It Up"
95	Cobra Starship featuring Sabi	"You Make Me Feel..."
96	Walk off the Earth	"Somebody That I Used to Know"
97	Hedley	"Invincible"
98	Luke Bryan	"Drunk on You"
99	Pitbull featuring Ne-Yo, Afrojack and Nayer	"Give Me Everything
100	Kristina Maria	"Our Song Comes On"

== Deaths ==
- January 2 – Ian Bargh, jazz pianist
- January 25 – Andrew MacNaughtan, photographer and music video director
- February 21 – Christopher Reimer, rock guitarist (Women)
- April 23 – Billy Bryans, percussionist and record producer (Parachute Club)
- September 23 – Sam Sniderman, founder of the Sam the Record Man chain

Preceded by 2011 in Canadian music	Canadian music 2012	Succeeded by 2013 in Canadian music
