= Friends in Bellwoods =

2007 compilation album by various artists

Compilation album by Various Artists
- Released: 2007
- Genre: indie rock
- Label: Out of This Spark

Various Artists chronology
Friends in Bellwoods (2007)	Friends in Bellwoods II (2009)

Friends in Bellwoods is a compilation album, released in 2007. It was the first release on Out of This Spark, through a distribution deal with Sonic Unyon Records. The album is named for a house on Bellwoods Avenue in Toronto, shared by two members of the band Ohbijou, which NOW has written "might just be the new epicentre of T.O.'s indie rock community". All of the featured artists are members or friends and collaborators of Ohbijou, and many of the tracks on the album were recorded in the house itself.

The album is a benefit for Toronto's Daily Bread Food Bank.

The album was officially released across Canada on February 12, 2007, although it was available for sale in some venues in Toronto in mid-January.

A second edition, Friends in Bellwoods II, was released in August 2009.

== Track listing ==
=== Disc One ===
1. The Bellwoods Crew, "Carry On"
2. Snailhouse, "Salvation Army (In Four)"
3. Friday Morning's Regret, "Wooden Sky"
4. Bry Webb and Casey Mecija, "Oh! Sweet Nuthin'"
5. We're Marching On, "Shithead Kids"
6. The D'Urbervilles, "We Are the Hunters"
7. Forest City Lovers, "Don't Go, Please"
8. Jonas Bonnetta, "French Toast"
9. Bahai Cassette, "SNIT...yada"
10. Germans, "Nature's Mouth"
11. Telefauna, "turbulence!"
12. The Nuts, "vb for jb"
13. Kids on TV, "Breakdance Hunx (PSBEUYS PNP Mix)"
14. Katie Stelmanis, "You'll Fall"
15. Jeremy Gara, "Thieves"
16. Alight, "cardinal + moon"
17. Nina Nielsen, "Cloudberry Mountain"
18. Tim Ford, "The Brantford Song"

=== Disc Two ===
1. Sebastien Grainger, "Young Mothers"
2. Barzin, "Queen Jane"
3. The Rural Alberta Advantage, "The Air"
4. Tusks, "Mothers vs. Sons"
5. Water Colour, "Hidden Sound"
6. Gentleman Reg, "Over My Head (4 track)"
7. Ohbijou, "The Otherside (Remix)"
8. The Acorn, "Brokered Heart"
9. Mantler, "Searching for a Song"
10. The Dinghies, "Barkskin"
11. Grand Mouse House, "Archways, Tunnels, Dotted Lines"
12. Allan Graham, "Waking Up in the Trees"
13. Oak Oak, "Now and Then"
14. Violence, "Self Defense"
15. The Meligrove Band, "Feversleep"
16. Nich Worby, "All Blind Mice"
17. Purple Hill, "Death Rides This Winters Wind"
18. Scott Remila, "On Their Own"
