= The Ford Plant =

Non-profit music venue in Brantford, Canada

Coordinates: 43°8′18″N 80°16′1.5″W

The Ford Plant, Brantford, Ontario, in 2007.

The Ford Plant was a not-for-profit music venue founded in 2002. Throughout its history it functioned as an art gallery (the One King Gallery), studio, music store, and record label. The venue was located in downtown Brantford, Ontario, Canada, an area well known for its festivals and social experiences. As a small building The Ford Plant only held roughly one hundred people, with party-goers often spilling out into the streets.

== History ==
The Ford Plant was founded in 2002 by Tim Ford (a member of the former indie/math rock band, The Vermicious Knid) and Chris George (a local designer and zine publisher) at its original location 60 Colborne Street. Josh Bean joined Ford and George and shortly thereafter the Ford Plant was relocated to its current location at the corner of King and Colborne streets (1 King Street). The Ford Plant became known for its alcohol-free, all ages, not-for-profit model.

The Ford Plant has welcomed bands from all over North America and beyond, including Arcade Fire, The Stills, The Unicorns, Julie Doiron, Wintersleep, Blue Rodeo, Great Lake Swimmers, Cuff the Duke, Final Fantasy, Jim Guthrie, The Most Serene Republic, Tokyo Police Club, Ninja High School, Zoobombs, Cursive, Grizzly Bear, Chad VanGaalen and Holy Fuck.

Josh Bean left in 2007 in order to focus on launching the Brantford Arts Block organization. At the time The Ford Plant venue was still run at its location at King and Colborne streets in downtown Brantford by an open-membership collective of volunteers, including founder Tim Ford.

On 11 February 2009, The Ford Plant made CBC Radio 3's list of the top 20 best live music venues in Canada, after having made the top 50 on 3 February, and the longlist of 114 on 28 January.

On 13 September 2010, The Ford Plant announced in a statement posted on Facebook, that it would be closing after the weekend of October 23. The weekend of October 23 featured a musical funeral of sorts with some special guests and old friends.

The building previously housing The Ford Plant was demolished after a fire in the early hours of Wednesday, February 12, 2020.

=== Murdered City Music Festival ===
During the first week of every August since its inception in 2002, The Ford Plant hosted a week-long music festival called the Murdered City Music Festival (often simply called Murdered City). This festival showcased independent Canadian acts and local artists, and was known to bring larger bands to a relatively small crowd. Some past notables of Murdered City include Wolf Parade, The Sadies, The Hidden Cameras, The Constantines, and The Meligrove Band.

Murdered City was cancelled in 2007, as several of the more popular bands backed out of the festival in favour of bigger shows. Instead, the Ford Plant held the Ghosts of Brantford Festival. Effectively the same music festival as Murdered City, the Ghosts of Brantford Festival aimed to book bands with a focus on independent music. Some of the bands that played the 2007 festival include Cuff the Duke, Rock Plaza Central, The Ghost Is Dancing, and Uncut. Murdered City returned in August 2008 with performances by Attack in Black, Ohbijou, The D'Urbervilles, Bruce Peninsula, and others.

=== The Ford Plant Recording Co. ===
The Ford Plant Recording Co.
- Founded: 2003
- Founder: Tim Ford; Chris George; Josh Bean
- Defunct: 2013
- Genre: Indie rock
- Country of origin: Canada
- Location: Brantford, Ontario

The Ford Plant Recording Co. was an independent record label, with a focus on promoting local musicians by distributing their music under The Ford Plant name. The Ford Plant had an in house recording studio for this purpose.

To date thirteen albums have been released under this label:

- (TFP-001) Various artists − Brantford Compilation CD
- (TFP-002) The Sourkeys − The Sourkeys (2004)
- (TFP-003) Silent Film Soundtrack − Modern Time
- (TFP-004) No Orchestra − No Orchestra
- (TFP-005) Thomas and the Evil Computer − Math Teachers Count
- (TFP-006) Silent Film Soundtrack − Diplomats and Confidants
- (TFP-007) The Vermicious Knid − Smalltown Devotion/Hometown Compultion (2005)
- (TFP-008) Hold Up Your End − Countdown to Destruction
- (TFP-009) Nich Worby − Oh, How?
- (TFP-010) Ryan Stanley − This Mountain Is a Hill
- (TFP-011) Dead Love Triangles – The Wandering Sickness
- (TFP-012) Arrows (Cursed Arrows) – Knives are Falling from the Sky
- (THEFP13) The Racoon Wedding - Gather Gather Bones Rattle Rattle Truth

== See also ==
- List of record labels
