= Bryan Webb =

Canadian singer-songwriter (born 1977)

- Also known as: Bry Webb
- Born: 22 June 1977 (age 49)
- Origin: London, Ontario, Canada
- Genre: Indie rock
- Occupation: Singer-songwriter
- Instruments: Guitar, vocals
- Years active: 1994–present
- Label: Idée Fixe
- Member of: Constantines
- Formerly of: Shoulder; Harbourcoats
- Website: ideefixerecords.com#artists

Bryan Webb (born 1977), sometimes credited as Bry Webb, is a Canadian singer and songwriter, best known as the lead vocalist for the indie rock band Constantines.

== History ==
Webb began his musical career playing in the emo band Shoulder in 1994, releasing a demo tape, a CD/LP and two 7" vinyl (including a split with Morning Again) before breaking up in 1997. Two years after Shoulder's breakup, in 1999, Webb and two former members of the band formed Constantines, though one of them quickly departed.

In 2007 he recorded a cover of The Velvet Underground's "Oh! Sweet Nuthin'" as a duet with Casey Mecija of Ohbijou for the compilation album, Friends in Bellwoods.

In 2009, Webb received a Genie Award nomination in the category Best Achievement in Music – Original Song for "Big Smoke", a song he wrote for the soundtrack to This Beautiful City.

While living in Montreal, Webb formed the Harbourcoats and recorded an album. In 2009 Webb and his wife decided to start a family in Guelph. Feist heard the Harbourcoats album and invited him to duet on her album. Webb provided back-up vocals on her album Metals, including the first track "The Bad in Each Other".

With the announced hiatus 12 August 2010 of the Constantines, Webb embraced his new role as a newlywed and father. His debut solo album Provider was released 15 November 2011 on Toronto label Idée Fixe Records. The first single, "Rivers of Gold", was inspired by the Constantines' first time playing the Dawson City Music Festival in the Yukon in 2005.

Webb is also the operations coordinator for CFRU-FM, the campus radio station at the University of Guelph. He previously served as programming coordinator at CFRU from 2010 to 2014.

Webb contributed the song "Someplace I'm Supposed to Be" to the 1 March 2013 episode of This American Life.

== Discography ==
=== Singles ===
Year	Title	From the Album
2007	"Oh! Sweet Nuthin'"	Friends in Bellwoods
2009	"Big Smoke"	This Beautiful City
2011	"Rivers of Gold"	Provider

=== Albums ===
Year	Album	Label
2011	Provider	Idée Fixe
2014	Free Will	Idée Fixe
2023	Run With Me	Idée Fixe

== See also ==
- Music of Canada
- Canadian rock
- List of Canadian musicians
