= Friends in Bellwoods II =

2009 compilation album by various artists

Compilation album by Various Artists
- Released: 2009
- Genre: indie rock
- Label: Out of This Spark

Various Artists chronology
Friends in Bellwoods (2007)	Friends in Bellwoods II (2009)

Friends in Bellwoods II is a compilation album, released in 2009 by Out of This Spark as a benefit for Toronto's Daily Bread Food Bank. The album is a sequel to the 2007 compilation Friends in Bellwoods.

Where the original album was, in part, a celebration of the scene and community that had emerged around the Trinity-Bellwoods home of Ohbijou's Casey Mecija, Bellwoods II marked an ending, as its recording and release coincided with Mecija learning that she would have to move out of the house due to a toxic mold infestation. Early coverage of the album's release also noted that where the original album had documented an emerging scene of artists who were largely unknown outside Toronto, by the time of the second album's release several of the involved artists — including Ohbijou, The Acorn, The Rural Alberta Advantage, Timber Timbre, Basia Bulat and Great Lake Swimmers — had broken out to significant national or international success.

== Track listing ==
=== Disc One ===
1. Forest City Lovers, "Minneapolis"
2. Le Pigeon, "Freezing Rain"
3. Basia Bulat, "My Heart Is a Warning"
4. The Acorn, "Slippery When Wet"
5. Canadian Wildlife, "Winter's Moon"
6. Double Suicide, "Touch the Sun"
7. Great Bloomers, "Find My Way"
8. Lisa Bozikovic, "The Letting Go"
9. Bellewoods, "Kneel on the Apron"
10. Kate Rogers, "The Same Party"
11. Timber Timbre, "Water"
12. No Kids, "All That Heaven Allows"
13. Snailhouse, "Don't Go Anywhere"
14. Final Fantasy, "Red Sun (Demo Version)"
15. Sylvie Smith, "On Our Own"
16. Bruce Peninsula, "In Parallel"
17. Gentleman Reg, "For Trust"
18. Evening Hymns, "Cedars"
19. Kite Hill, "Tom Thumbtack"
20. The Bellwoods Crew, "Staten Island Waltz"

=== Disc Two ===
1. The Dinghies, "The Right Honourable Stephen Harper"
2. Bocce, "Inspiration Bellwoods"
3. Kids on TV, "Poison"
4. Katie Stelmanis, "Believe Me"
5. The D'Urbervilles, "Magic Arrow"
6. Sebastien Grainger, "Home Is the Light"
7. Violence, "Living Off the Land"
8. Ohbijou, "An Ode to an End"
9. Great Lake Swimmers, "Send Me a Letter"
10. The Low Notes, "Glory Glory"
11. Snowblink, "When Pushed from a High Branch"
12. Lice, "yggdrasil"
13. Emma McKenna, "Happiness"
14. Richard Laviolette, "Media Song"
15. The Adam Brown, "Joy Rider"
16. The Phonemes, "April, Let's Send His Colleagues an Email"
17. The Rural Alberta Advantage, "Rough and Tumble"
18. Tusks, "New to Old Money"
19. Hooded Fang, "Highway Steam"
20. The Wooden Sky, "My Old Ghosts"
