= Kids on TV =

Canadian punk-house queercore band (2003–2013)

- Origin: Toronto, Ontario, Canada
- Genres: Punk-house, queercore
- Years active: 2003–2013
- Labels: Chicks on Speed Records, Blocks Recording Club
- Members: John Caffery; Minus Smile (Scott Kerr); Chris Mills; Roxanne Luchak

Kids on TV was a Canadian punk-house queercore band from Toronto, active from 2003 to 2013. The group consisted of John Caffery on bass and vocals, Minus Smile on drums, electronics and vocals, Chris 'Wolf' Mills on guitar and vocals, and Roxanne Luchak on keyboard and vocals. The band was known for performing outside of the usual venues, and appeared at warehouses, steambaths and film festivals, among other places.

== History ==
They released their first EP, Hustle! in 2003. In 2005, they collaborated with Boy George on a remix of their song "Breakdance Hunx". That song appeared on their debut album, Mixing Business with Pleasure, which was released in 2007.

Also in 2005, their remix of the song "Bitchsy" by Lesbians on Ecstasy appeared on Giggles in the Dark, an LP devoted to remixes of Lesbians on Ecstasy's songs by various artists. Kids on TV's version features Maggie MacDonald (of the bands the Hidden Cameras and Republic of Safety) as well as sampling from the song "All Women Are Bitches" by Fifth Column, which had originally inspired the Lesbians on Ecstasy song.

In 2007, Kids on TV collaborated with Ohbijou for a concert on the CBC Radio One series Fuse.

On September 4, 2012, Kids on TV released their second album Pantheon, which featured Diamond Rings, Snax, Katie Stelmanis, Gentleman Reg Vermue and Shunda K.

In 2013, they performed at Fucked Up's 2013 Long Winter series at The Great Hall in Toronto.

== Discography ==
=== Albums ===
- Mixing Business with Pleasure (2007), Chicks on Speed Records, Blocks Recording Club
- Pantheon (2012), Chicks on Speed Records

=== EPs ===
- Hustle! (2003), independent
- Shapeshifting Mutants (2009), Chicks on Speed Records

=== Compilation appearances ===
- "36 Pills" on Toronto Is the Best!!! Toronto Is Great!!! (2004), Blocks Recording Club
- "Bitchsy" on Giggles in the Dark - Lesbians on Ecstasy Remixes (2005), Alien8 Recordings
- "Breakdance Hunx (Market Value Mix)" on Girl Monster (2006), Chicks on Speed Records
- "Breakdance Hunx (PSBEUYS PNP Mix)" on Friends in Bellwoods (2007), Out of This Spark
- "Poison" on Friends in Bellwoods 2 (2009), Out of This Spark
