= Glory Hope Mountain =

Studio album by The Acorn
- Released: 25 September 2007
- Recorded: 13 January – 4 July 2007; Ottawa
- Genre: Indie folk
- Length: 48:15
- Label: Paper Bag
- Producer: Jarrett Bartlett

The Acorn chronology
| The Pink Ghosts (2004) | Glory Hope Mountain (2007) | No Ghost (2010) |

Professional ratings
Review scores
| Source | Rating |
|---|---|
| Pitchfork Media | (6.9/10) |
| This Is Fake DIY | 7/10 stars |
| Twisted Ear | 3/5 stars |
| Allmusic | 4/5 stars |

Glory Hope Mountain is a concept album by Canadian indie folk band The Acorn, released 25 September 2007 on Paper Bag Records. It is their second full-length.

The album was recorded and produced by Jarrett Bartlett.

Several members of Toronto-based indie pop band Ohbijou are credited with playing instruments and additional recording on the album. Singer Casey Mecija provides vocals for the final track.

The album is based on the life of Rolf Klausener’s Honduran-born mother, Gloria Esperanza Montoya, and the title is a rough translation of her name.

The album art was inspired by local Ottawa mixed-media artist Amy Alice Thompson's series "Gloria".

== Track listing ==
All lyrics were written by Rolf Carlos Klausener. All music was written by The Acorn.

| No. | Title | Length |
|---|---|---|
| 1. | "Hold Your Breath" | 5:54 |
| 2. | "Flood Pt.1" | 4:22 |
| 3. | "Even While You’re Sleeping" | 3:38 |
| 4. | "Crooked Legs" | 5:08 |
| 5. | "Glory" | 4:39 |
| 6. | "Oh Napoleon" | 4:14 |
| 7. | "Low Gravity" | 3:35 |
| 8. | "Sister Margaret" | 2:42 |
| 9. | "Antenna" | 3:00 |
| 10. | "Plateau Ramble" | 3:06 |
| 11. | "Flood Pt.2" | 3:45 |
| 12. | "Lullaby (Mountain)" | 4:20 |
