= 360 Screenings =

- Formation: January 2012
- Type: Immersive Cinema / Live Performance
- Headquarters: Toronto, Ontario, Canada
- Founders: Ned Loach Robert Gontier
- Website: www.360screenings.com

360 Screenings, Inc. better known as 360 Screenings is a Canada-based immersive film and live performance hybrid events company based out of Toronto, Ontario. It was co-founded by Artistic Producer, Ned Loach, and artistic director, Robert Gontier, in January 2012. The Globe and Mail's chief film critic, Liam Lacey, states the company is "part mystery theatre, part movie, with an element of web-organized flash mob, it is part of a larger cultural movement toward bringing a social aspect back to moviegoing." The Toronto Star notes that this is "a new event that seeks to enhance the special magic of cinema."

For a given performance, a date is announced in advance, but the location is kept secret until 24 hours before the event. A live performance at the beginning is designed to get the audience to guess what the film will be that night.

Since its inception in January 2012 each event has played to sold-out audiences and received mainly positive reviews from critics. The company has also given back to the community, including the Daily Bread Food Bank. It has been covered by a wide variety of news outlets, including; The Globe and Mail, The Toronto Star, Metro News, Global TV, Newstalk 1010, Canadian Press and Business News Network.
