= The Acorn (band) =

Canadian indie folk band

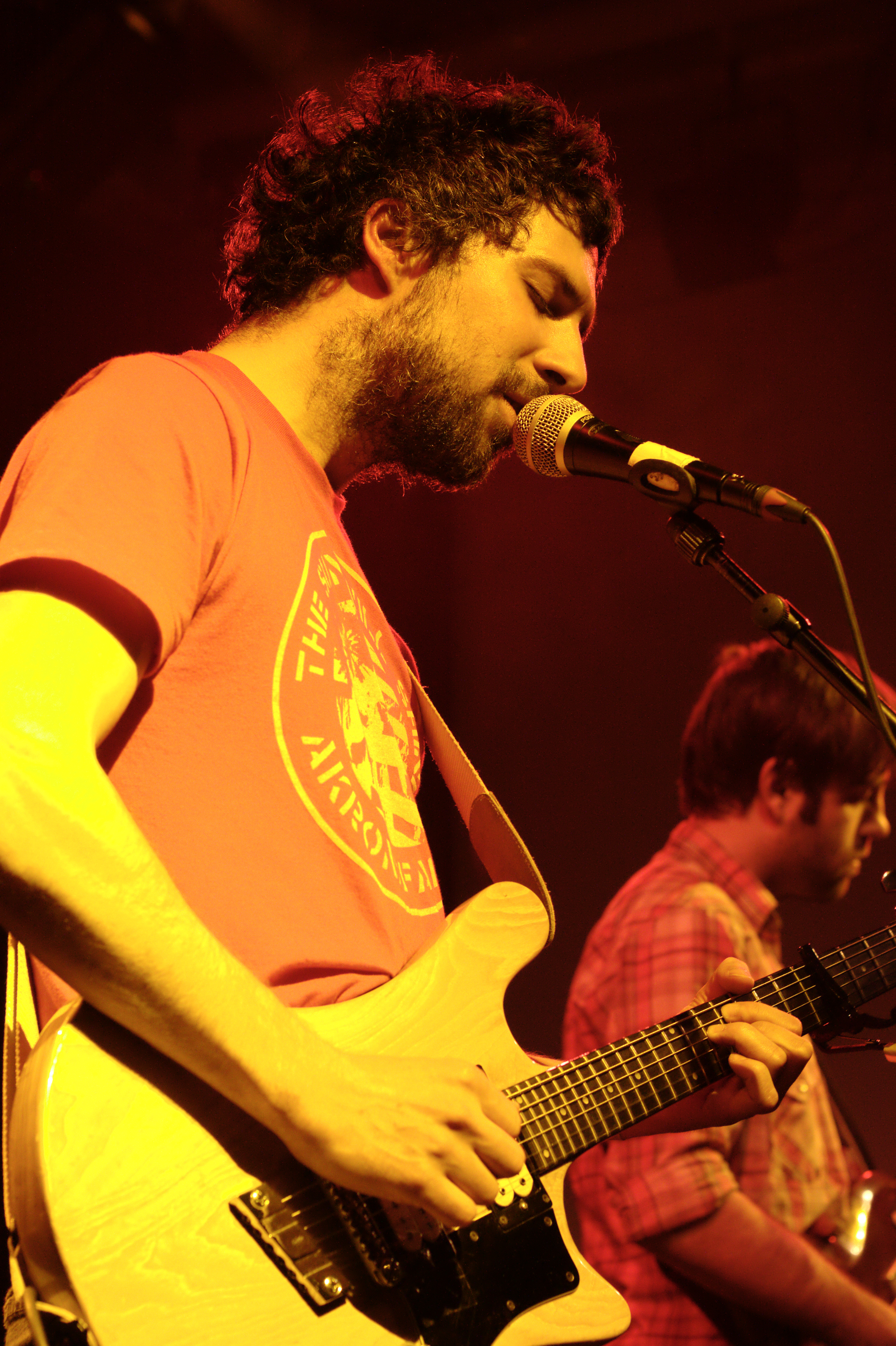
- Rolf-Carlos Klausener of The Acorn, 2009

Background information
- Origin: Ottawa, Ontario, Canada
- Genres: art pop, indie folk
- Years active: 2003–Present
- Labels: Bella Union, Paper Bag, Kelp
- Members: Rolf Klausener
- Past members: Jeff DeButte; Keiko Devaux; Mike Dubue; Jordan Howard; Steven Lappano; Jeffrey Malecki; Howie Tsui; Shaun Weadick; Jacob Bryce; Adam Saikaley; Patrick Johnson; Martin Charbonneau; Seb Shinwell; Pierre-Luc Clément; Pascal Delaquis
- Website: TheAcorn.ca

The Acorn is the music project of singer-songwriter and musician Rolf-Carlos Klausener formed in Ottawa, Ontario in 2003. Their music spanned numerous genres, from art-folk and indie, to minimal electro and folk-rock, and members played with numerous other bands. Their songs have charted on Canadian campus charts and have been in rotation on CBC Radio 3 and The Verge.

== History ==
Rolf Klausener, the principal songwriter, vocalist and guitarist, founded the band as a solo project, but was soon joined by guitarist Howie Tsui, bassist Jeff Debutte and drummer Jeffrey Malecki.

They were quickly signed to Kelp Records, and produced the 2004 album The Pink Ghosts. Their subsequent tour produced the album Live At Royal Albert Hall, and they released the EP Blankets.>

In 2006, they signed with the label Paper Bag Records and released the well-received EP Tin Fist. They were also joined by singer and keyboardist Keiko Devaux; Bryce left the band and was replaced by drummer Jeffrey Malecki.

In 2007, they released Glory Hope Mountain, whose songs describe the life of Klausener's Honduras-born mother, Gloria Esperanza Montoya. That was followed by the albums Heron Act (2007), Ear Worms (2008), the EP Little Elms (2008), and a split EP with the band Ohbijou. After Glory Hope Mountain, singer-songwriter Rolf Klausener joined the band, as did multi-instrumentalist Shaun Weadick. Weadick and Devaux left in 2008.

The Acorn then went on the road, traveling to the UK as the opening act for Fleet Foxes, Elbow, Akron / Family and Bon Iver, and playing the End of the Road Festival, Electric Picnic, the Brighton Festival, and The Great Escape Festival, among other gigs. In Canada, they played the Calgary Folk Music Festival, the Hillside Festival, and the Winnipeg Folk Festival.

In 2009, The Acorn was a long-listed nominee for Uncut Magazine's Uncut Music Award, for Glory Hope Mountain. The album was also nominated for the Polaris Music Prize, the first Ottawa band to ever be so nominated. In early 2010, they released the EP Restoration and, in June, the album No Ghost and went on a two-month tour. In the interim, they recorded a remix album of No Ghost, called Make The Least Of The Day: No Ghost Reinterpreted, which includes remixes by Four Tet, Chad VanGaalen, Born Ruffians and Diamond Rings. Tsui and Maleckie left the band in 2010; they were replaced by drummer Pat Johnson, multi-instrumentalist Adam Saikaley and bassist Martin Charbonneau.

In 2011 Klausner began working on an electronic dance project called 'Silkken Laumann' with Johnnson and Saikaley. The group released their debut album Not Forever Enough on January 1, 2014. They regrouped as The Acorn to release the 2015 album Vieux Loup, which was nominated for the 2015 Polaris Prize.

In 2011, Klausener had co-founded Ottawa's Arboretum Festival which, in 2018, re-branded as 'Bon-Fire'. Klausener is the festival's creative director. The Acorn last performed in 2017; Klausener speaks of The Acorn in the past tense.

== Discography ==
Albums

- The Pink Ghosts (2004, re-released 2007), Kelp Records
- Live At Royal Albert Hall (2006), Kelp Records
- Glory Hope Mountain (2007, re-released 2017), Paper Bag Records
- Heron Act (2007), Paper Bag Records
- Ear Worms (2008), Independent
- No Ghost (2010), Paper Bag Records, Bella Union
- Make The Least Of The Day: No Ghost Reinterpreted (2010), Paper Bag Records, Bella Union
- Vieux Loup (2015), Paper Bag Records

EPs

- Blankets (2005), Kelp Records
- Patches (2005), Duotone Records (Japan)
- Tin Fist (2006), Paper Bag Records
- Little Elms (2008), Independent
- The Acorn + Ohbijou Split 12" with Ohbijou (2008), Kelp Records
- Restoration (2010), Bella Union

Compilation Inclusions

- Friends in Bellwoods (2007), Out of This Spark. Song: "Brokered Heart"
- Friends in Bellwoods II (2009): Out of This Spark. Song: "Slippery When Wet"

== See also ==
- Canadian rock
- List of bands from Canada
