= City Streets =

City Streets may refer to:

- City Streets (1931 film), a 1931 film starring Gary Cooper
- City Streets (1938 film), a 1938 film starring Leo Carrillo and Edith Fellows
- City Streets (album), a 1989 album by Carole King
- The City Streets, a band from Edmonton, Alberta, Canada
