= Kat Burns =

Musician, artist

- Born: Kat Burns; Ontario, Canada
- Origin: Toronto, Ontario, Canada
- Genres: pop, folk, folktronica, synthpop
- Occupations: Singer/songwriter, artist, actor
- Instruments: Vocals, guitar, piano, synth, ukulele
- Years active: 2005–present
- Labels: Play the Triangle, Out of This Spark, Arts & Crafts
- Website: www.playthetriangle.com

Kat Burns is a Canadian musician known as KASHKA who was the lead songwriter and vocalist of Forest City Lovers. She is also a visual artist and voice over actor.

== Career ==
Burns led folk-pop band Forest City Lovers from 2006 to 2012, releasing three full-length albums and one vinyl single with the band before their indefinite hiatus. In 2010, she started KASHKA as a side project and has since taken it on full-time. She has released three full-length albums and a number of singles under the "KASHKA" moniker. Burns is also involved in community organisations Girls Rock Camp Toronto and SKETCH.

== Discography ==
=== KASHKA ===
- Vichada (2012)
- Bound (2013)
- Bones EP (2014)
- Heavy Ghost single (2016)
- Port William Instrumentals (2017)
- Relax (2017)
- Quarantine Dreams single (2020)
- Soft (2021)
- Softer (2021)
- Smokin' Hot single (2023)

=== Forest City Lovers ===
- The Sun and the Wind (2006)
- Haunting Moon Sinking (2008)
- Phodilus & Tyto (2009)
- Carriage (2010)

=== Kat Burns ===
- For the Birds (2005)

=== Guest appearances ===
- "Don't Go, Please" by Forest City Lovers on the Friends In Bellwoods compilation (Out of This Spark, 2007)
- "Minneapolis" by Forest City Lovers on the Friends In Bellwoods II compilation (Out of This Spark, 2009)

== Music videos ==
=== KASHKA ===
- Vichada (2012) directed by Kat Burns.
- Winter Light (2012) directed by Kat Burns.
- Bloodlines (2013) directed by Adam Seward.
- Never Had It (2013) directed by Daniel Tahmazian.
- Salmon Arms (Acoustic) (2014) directed by Kat Burns.
- Body Like Lead (2015) directed by Stephanie Markowitz.

=== Forest City Lovers ===
- Song for Morrie (2007) directed by Stuart A. McIntyre
- Pirates (2008) directed by Kat Burns.
- Tell Me, Cancer (2010) directed by Ryan Marr.
- If I Were A Tree (2010) co-directed by Jared Raab and Colin Medley
- Keep the Kids Inside (2011) directed by Isotoica

== Awards ==
=== KASHKA ===
- Soundclash Music Awards 2013 (finalist)

=== Forest City Lovers ===
- Verge Music Awards Artist of the Year 2011 (nominee)
- Verge Music Awards Album of the Year 2011 (nominee)
