= The Wooden Sky =

Canadian indie folk band

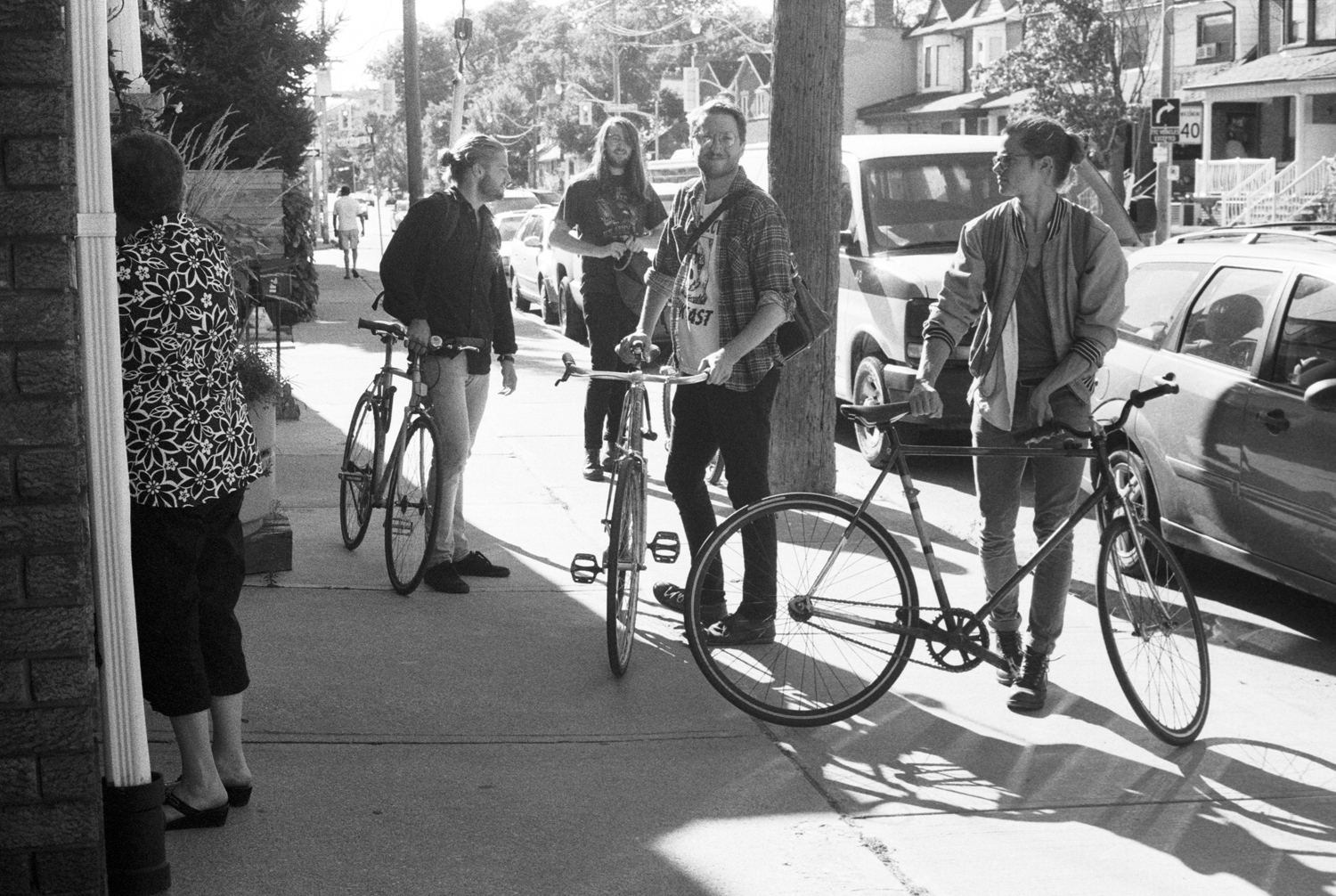
- The Wooden Sky outside the studio

Background information
- Also known as: Friday Morning's Regret, B. Knox, Tom Pizza and the Heartburners
- Origin: Toronto, Ontario, Canada
- Genres: indie folk, Indie rock, folk rock
- Years active: 2007–present
- Label: Chelsea Records (Canada) / Nevado Records (World)
- Members: Gavin Gardiner; Andrew Wyatt; Simon Walker; Andrew Kekewich; Edwin Huizinga
- Past members: Chris Cocca; Peter Krpan; Anissa Hart; Mika Posen
- Website: http://thewoodenskymusic.com

The Wooden Sky are a Canadian indie folk band based in Toronto, Ontario.

== History ==
The band originated after lead singer Gavin Gardiner, of Morden, Manitoba, wrote songs for a school project while attending Ryerson University (now Toronto Metropolitan University). He formed the band with bassist Andrew Wyatt and drummer Chris Cocca, who has left the band. They originally formed as Friday Morning's Regret, releasing the song "The Wooden Sky" on the Friends in Bellwoods compilation album, but opted to change the band's name to The Wooden Sky before releasing their debut album.

Their debut album, released in 2007, is When Lost at Sea. Band members now include Gardiner (vocals, guitars, harmonica), Wyatt (bass, vocals), Simon Walker (piano, vocals, guitar) and Andrew Kekewich (percussion). The band is frequently joined by Anissa Hart (Ohbijou, Kite Hill, The Rural Alberta Advantage) (cello), Mika Posen (Forest City Lovers, Timber Timbre) (violin, viola), and Edwin Huizinga (The Mars Volta) (violin).

The band recorded their second album, If I Don't Come Home You'll Know I'm Gone in late 2008 and early 2009 in Montreal with producer Howard Bilerman (Arcade Fire, Thee Silver Mt. Zion, Basia Bulat). This record, released on August 25, 2009, saw them push the limits of the folk and country genres that was heard on When Lost at Sea with a more sonic and multi-instrumentally layered aesthetic.

They toured extensively throughout 2009 and 2010 in Canada, Europe and the United States in support of their 2009 release If I Don't Come Home You'll Know I'm Gone with Elliott Brood, The Rural Alberta Advantage and Yukon Blonde.

On February 28, 2012, the band released its third LP, titled Every Child a Daughter, Every Moon a Sun. This record was again recorded by Bilerman, this time with the help of Radwan Ghazi Moumneh, and Montreal's iconic Hotel 2 Tango.

In 2014, the band left their former record label to start their own Chelsea Records, an artist driven label.

Their most recent album, Swimming in Strange Waters, was released in 2017.

Gardiner subsequently collaborated with "Champagne" James Robertson, Ben Whiteley and Lyle Mozlan in MOONRIIVR, a project who released their debut album Vol. 1 in 2023. They subsequently collaborated with Peter Dreimanis on his 2025 album Peter Dreams and MOONRIIVR.

Gardiner has also been a producer and recording engineer for other artists, including The Rural Alberta Advantage, Dan Mangan, David Myles, Jacob Brodovsky, The Golden Dogs, Jason Collett, Royal City, Evening Hymns, Great Bloomers and Kalle Mattson.

== Discography ==
- When Lost at Sea (2007)
- If I Don't Come Home You'll Know I'm Gone (2009)
- Bedrooms + Backstreets Tour EP (2009)
- City of Light Tour EP (2011)
- Every Child a Daughter, Every Moon a Sun (2012) — No. 66 CAN
- Let's Be Ready (2014/2015)
- Swimming in Strange Waters (2017)

=== Compilations ===
- Friends in Bellwoods (2007): "The Wooden Sky"
- Friends in Bellwoods II (2009): "My Old Ghosts"
- Lead singer Gavin Gardiner sang the lead vocal on the song "Asteroid" from Ryan Granville-Martin's album Mouthparts and Wings (2013), which features a different vocalist on each song.
