= KNID =

KNID may refer to:

- the ICAO code for Naval Air Weapons Station China Lake, near Ridgecrest, California, United States
- KNID (FM), a radio station (107.1 FM) licensed to North Enid, Oklahoma, United States
- the Vermicious knid, a hostile shape-shifting alien race
- The Vermicious Knid, a now-defunct indie rock band
- Kirby: Nightmare in Dream Land, a video game for the Game Boy Advance
