= Call If You Need Me (disambiguation) =

"Call If You Need Me" is a 2018 song by Vance Joy.

Call If You Need Me may also refer to:

- "Call If You Need Me", a song by Galantis from the 2015 album Pharmacy
- "Call If You Need Me", a song by The Wooden Sky from the 2009 album If I Don't Come Home You'll Know I'm Gone
- "Call If You Need Me", a 2012 song by Jen Cloher with Kieran Ryan from the EP Baby We Were Born to Die
- Call If You Need Me: The Uncollected Fiction and Other Prose, a 2001 collection of works by Raymond Carver
