= Special Affections =

Studio album by Diamond Rings
- Released: October 25, 2010
- Recorded: 2009
- Genre: Indie Rock, Indie Pop, Synthpop
- Length: 41:47
- Label: Secret City Records
- Producer: James Bunton, Diamond Rings

Diamond Rings chronology
Special Affections (2010)	Free Dimensional (2012)

Professional ratings
Aggregate scores
Source	Rating
Metacritic	83/100
Review scores
Source	Rating
AllMusic	4/5 stars
The A.V. Club	(B)
Chart Attack	4/5 stars
Eye Weekly	4/5 stars
Pitchfork Media	(8.2/10)
Slant Magazine	4/5 stars
Toronto Star	3/4 stars

Special Affections is the debut album by Canadian musician Diamond Rings. It was released on October 25, 2010.

Special Affections received a nod from Exclaim! as the No. 11 Pop & Rock Album of 2010. The album was also named as a longlisted nominee for the 2011 Polaris Music Prize.

== Track listing ==
No.	Title	Length
1.	"Play By Heart"	4:53
2.	"Wait & See"	3:35
3.	"On Our Own"	5:05
4.	"You & Me"	3:25
5.	"Give It Up"	4:43
6.	"Pre-Owned Heart"	4:25
7.	"Something Else"	4:26
8.	"You Oughta Know"	4:04
9.	"It's Not My Party"	4:26
10.	"All Yr Songs"	2:47

=== "Something Else" Itunes Single Remix E.P. ===
Something Else Itunes Single Remix E.P.
No.	Title	Length
1.	"Something Else."	4:26
2.	"Something Else (Mike Gloria Remix)."	4:16
3.	"Something Else (Disco Fries Remix)."	3:51
4.	"Something Else (Dark Intensity Remix)."	3:49
5.	"Something Else (Cadence Remix)."	4:09
