= If I Don't Come Home You'll Know I'm Gone =

Studio album by the Wooden Sky
- Released: August 2009
- Recorded: 2008–2009 in Montreal, QC at Hotel2Tango and Toronto, ON at Lincoln County Social Club
- Genre: Indie rock, folk rock, alternative country
- Label: Black Box Recordings
- Producer: Howard Bilerman and the Wooden Sky

The Wooden Sky chronology
When Lost at Sea (2007)	If I Don't Come Home You'll Know I'm Gone (2009)

Professional ratings
Review scores
Source	Rating
Uncut	4/5 stars

If I Don't Come Home You'll Know I'm Gone is the second album by Canadian independent rock band the Wooden Sky, released in August 2009.

== Track listing ==
All songs written by Gavin Gardiner and the Wooden Sky, except where noted.

1. "Oh My God (It Still Means a Lot to Me)" – 3:28
2. "(Bit Part)" – 3:18
3. "Angels" – 2:11
4. "My Old Ghosts" – 3:02
5. "Call If You Need Me." – 2:45
6. "When We Were Young" – 3:15
7. "An Evening Hymn" – 4:11 (Jonas Bonnetta and Gavin Gardiner)
8. "Something Hiding for Us in the Night." – 5:29
9. "Oslo" – 3:06
10. "The Late King Henry" – 2:24
11. "Lock and Key" - 3:48
12. "Fairweather Friends" - 4:20
13. "River Song One" - 3:45
