= When Lost at Sea =

Studio album by The Wooden Sky
- Released: September 2007
- Recorded: 2006–2007
- Genre: Indie rock, folk rock, alternative country
- Label: Black Box Recordings
- Producer: Gavin Gardiner and The Wooden Sky

The Wooden Sky chronology
When Lost at Sea (2007)	If I Don't Come Home You'll Know I'm Gone (2009)

When Lost at Sea is the debut album by The Wooden Sky, released in September 2007. The album was engineered by Ryan Hadley and John Nazario.

== Track listing ==
All songs were written by Gavin Gardiner and The Wooden Sky, except where noted.

1. "This Bird Has Flown" – 3:18
2. "The Wooden Sky" – 4:23
3. "North Dakota" – 3:51
4. "Darker Streets Than Mine" – 2:49
5. "Angst For the Memories" – 3:27
6. "Requiem For Mary" – 5:13
7. "Rant in Blue" – 3:49
8. "When Lost at Sea" – 3:11
9. "Virginia" – 2:20 (A. Colvin and FGH. Colvin)
10. "Poor Caroline" – 3:28
11. "The Lonesome Death of Helen Betty Osborne" - 4:30
