= No Ghost =

Studio album by The Acorn
- Released: 1 June 2010
- Recorded: 7–27 June 2009; Lac Charron Cottage, Bouchette, Quebec; 10–16 August 2009; Treatment Room, Montreal
- Genre: Indie folk
- Label: Paper Bag; Bella Union
- Producer: Jarrett Bartlett

The Acorn chronology
Glory Hope Mountain	No Ghost

No Ghost is an album by Canadian indie folk band The Acorn, released 1 June 2010 on Paper Bag Records and Bella Union. It is their third full-length.

The album was recorded by Jarrett Bartlett.

Comparing this album to their last album, Glory Hope Mountain, band leader Rolf Klausener said, "It's a lot harder, it's got a lot more electric guitars, it's got a bit of a Yo La Tengo-y or Talk Talk kind of spaciousness, but then it also feels a little like a Crazy Horse record at times." He has said that his favourite songs on the album are "Cobbled in Dust" and "Misplaced".

== Reception ==
The album has received mostly positive reviews. Graeme Thomson of Uncut wrote, "For anyone who fretted that Glory Hope Mountain might have been a beautiful fluke, No Ghost confirms The Acorn’s credentials, building thrillingly on the band’s ability to access a variety of moods and textures." Critic Kevin Harley of The Independent wrote that "the dynamism in its swerves from rhythmic, rolling rockers ("Bobcat Gold Wraith") to gentler laments ("On the Line") suggest a confidence behind the surface modesty." . Critic Daniel Kolitz of prefixmag.com received the album favorably, rating it a 7.5 out of 10.0.

== Track listing ==
All songs were written by Rolf Klausener, except as noted.

1. "Cobbled from Dust"
2. "Restoration"
3. "Misplaced"
4. "I Made the Law"
5. "Crossed Wires" (Jeff DeButte)
6. "On the Line"
7. "Bobcat Goldwraith"
8. "No Ghost"
9. "Slippery When Wet"
10. "Almanac"
11. "Kindling to Cremation"
