= Matters (band) =

Canadian indie rock band

- Origin: Guelph, Ontario
- Genres: Indie rock
- Years active: 2005–2011
- Labels: Out of This Spark; Hype Lighter
- Members: Tim Bruton; Kyle Donnelly; John O'Regan; Greg Santilly
- Past members: Adam Seward; Steve Hesselink; C.L. Smith
- Website: officialmatters.org

Matters was a Canadian indie rock band from Guelph, Ontario. The band consisted of Tim Bruton (guitar/synth), Kyle Donnelly (bass), John O'Regan (lead vocals/guitar/keyboard) and Greg Santilly (drums). They played rock music that had elements of punk, dance, and art rock, and used multiple transitions and hooks rather than traditional verse/chorus song structures.

== History ==
=== The D'Urbervilles ===
Formed in 2005 as The D'Urbervilles while the members were students at the University of Guelph, the band originally consisted of O'Regan, Bruton, Donnelly, and drummer C.L. Smith. Prior to Smith's departure, the band independently released their debut EP The D'Urbervilles, which reached No. 37 on the Earshot Radio Chart for the month of May 2006. The D'Urbervilles toured and recorded their debut album, We Are the Hunters, with replacement drummers Steve Hesselink and Adam Seward before selecting Santilly as a permanent member in the fall of 2007. We Are the Hunters was released on the Toronto label Out of This Spark on February 19, 2008 and hit No. 13 on the earshot! charts for the month of March. The band completed work on their second full-length, although they have gone on record as saying it's unlikely to be released.

As the D'Urbervilles, the group has toured alongside Malajube, You Say Party! We Say Die!, Immaculate Machine and Forest City Lovers in addition to performing at Pop Montreal, SXSW, Ottawa Bluesfest, and NXNE.

=== Change of name ===
The band changed their name to Matters in March 2011 to signal their shift in musical direction and visual style.

== Discography ==
=== Singles ===
- Get In Or Get Out 7" - Hype Lighter - 2011

=== Albums ===
- The D'Urbervilles - Independent - 2006.
- We Are the Hunters - Out of This Spark - 2008.

=== Compilations ===
- Friends in Bellwoods - Out of This Spark - 2007.
- Friends in Bellwoods 2 - Out of This Spark - 2009.

== Member associated acts ==
- Kyle Donnelly is a member of Forest City Lovers.
- Tim Bruton also performs with Forest City Lovers, Evening Hymns, and The Magic.
- Greg Santilly plays in Slow Hand Motëm.
- John O'Regan performs solo as Diamond Rings.

== See also ==
- Music of Canada
- Canadian rock
- List of Canadian musicians
- List of bands from Canada
- Category:Canadian musical groups
