= Evening Hymns =

Canadian folk-rock band

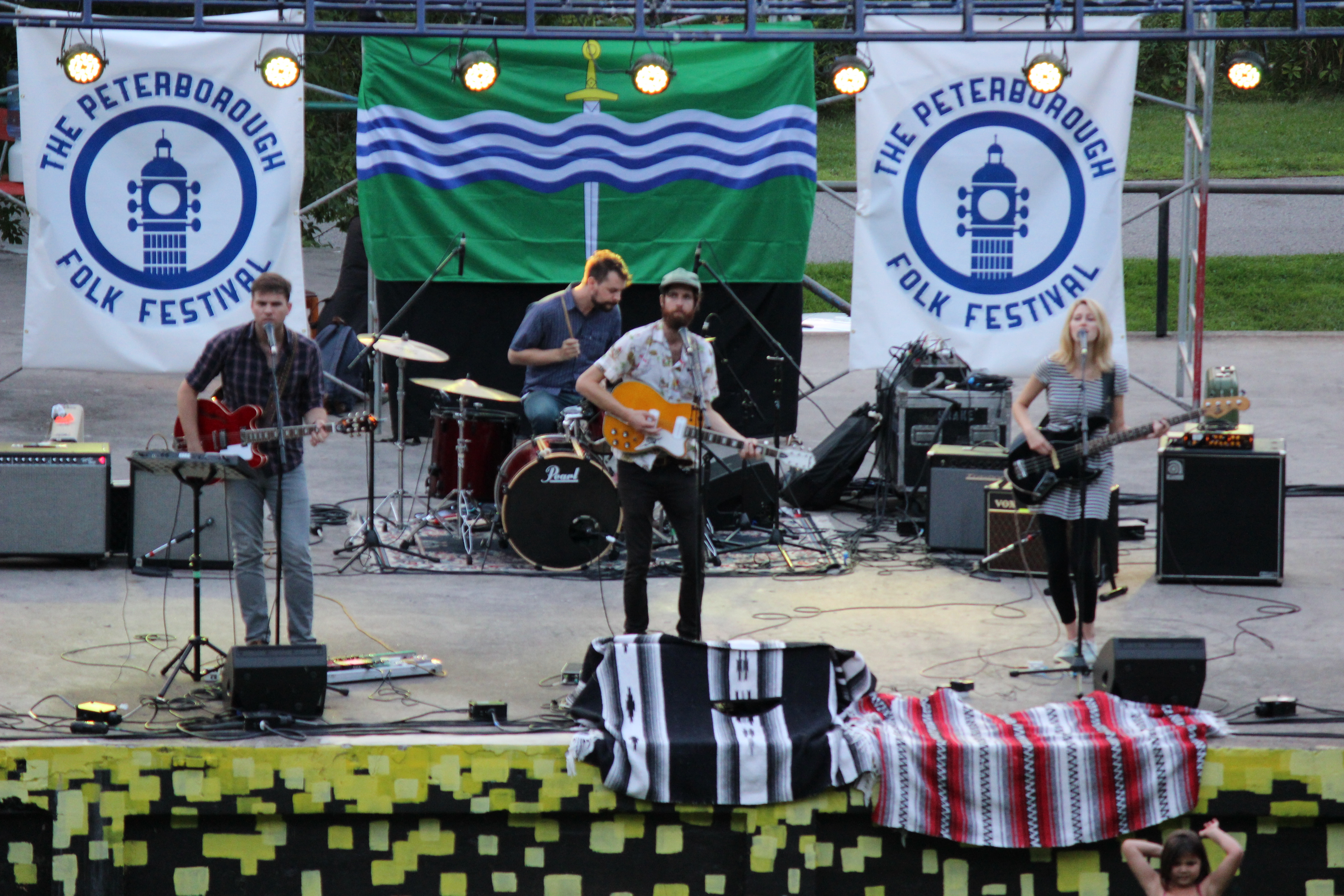

Background information
- Origin: Toronto, Ontario, Canada
- Genres: Indie rock, folk rock
- Years active: 2007–present
- Labels: Out of This Spark, Kütu Folk
- Members: Jonas Bonnetta
- Website: eveninghymns.com

Evening Hymns is a Canadian indie folk rock band, whose core member is singer and songwriter Jonas Bonnetta. The remainder of the band consists of a rotating collective of musicians, including members of Ohbijou, The Wooden Sky, The Burning Hell, The D'Urbervilles and Forest City Lovers.

== History ==
A native of Orono, Ontario, Bonnetta released a solo recording, Farewell to Harmony, under his own name in 2007 before choosing the name Evening Hymns. The first release under the Evening Hymns name was Spirit Guides in 2009 on indie record label Out Of This Spark and Kütu Folk Records in France. The album's songs were mainly sad and reflective. Their 2012 studio album Spectral Dusk featured Sylvie Smith.

After a period of touring, to support the album, Bonnetta spent time writing songs, and then Evening Hymns signed to Outside Music in June 2015. This led to the recording of the album Quiet Energies, released in September, 2015 in Canada and the United States, as well as on Kütu Folk Records in France.

He composed the music for Ryan Noth's 2021 film Drifting Snow, in which he also had his first acting role.

== Discography ==
=== Albums ===
- Farewell to Harmony (2007)
- Spirit Guides (2009)
- Spectral Dusk (2012)
- Quiet Energies (2015)
- Heavy Nights (2020)

=== EPs ===
- Let's All Get Happy Together (2007)

=== Singles ===
- I Can Only Be Good (2020)

=== Contributions ===
- Friends in Bellwoods, "French Toast" (2007)
- Friends in Bellwoods II, "Cedars" (2009)

== Track appearances ==
"You and Jake", from the 2009 album Spectral Dusk, is briefly featured in the 2015 movie Aloha (2015 film).

== See also ==
- Music of Canada
- Canadian rock
- List of Canadian musicians
- Category:Canadian musical groups
