= Spectral Dusk =

Studio album by Evening Hymns
- Released: 8 April 2013
- Genre: Folk rock
- Length: 56:52
- Label: Tin Angel Records, Shuffling Feet, Kütu Folk, Strange Ways

Evening Hymns chronology
Spirit Guides (2009)	Spectral Dusk (2013)

Spectral Dusk is a studio album by Canadian indie folk-rock band Evening Hymns, released in 2013. The album was longlisted for the 2013 Polaris Music Prize.

== Track listing ==
1. Intro (2:07)
2. Arrows (5:35)
3. Family Tree (4:27)
4. You and Jake (5:54)
5. Cabin in the Burn (6:35)
6. Asleep in the Pews (5:30)
7. Spirit in the Sky (3:21)
8. Irving Lake Access Road, February 12, 2011 (9:16)
9. Song to Sleep To (2:16)
10. Moon River (4:35)
11. Spectral Dusk (7:21)

All songs written by Jonas Bonetta
Recorded and mixed by James Bunton
Produced by James Bunton and Jonas Bonnetta
Mastered by Fedge
