= Heavy Nights =

Studio album by Evening Hymns
- Released: June 26, 2020
- Length: 38:18
- Label: Shuffling Feat

Evening Hymns chronology
Quiet Energies (2015)	Heavy Nights (2020)

Professional ratings
Aggregate scores
Source	Rating
Metacritic	80/100
Review scores
Source	Rating
American Songwriter	3.5/5 stars
Exclaim!	8/10

Heavy Nights is the fourth studio album by Canadian indie rock band Evening Hymns. It was released on June 26, 2020 under Shuffling Feet Records.

== Singles ==
On April 10, 2020, Evening Hymns released the first single for the album, "I Can Only Be Good". The single was recorded at Jonas Bonnetta's Port William Sound studio, and features Canadian multi-instrumentalist Joseph Shabason on saxophone. Bonnetta explained that he wrote the song based on the perspective "of someone falling out of love and with the end in sight".

The second single "My Drugs, My Dreams" was released on May 8, 2020. In a press release, Bonnetta explained that he wrote the song after his breakup, and had been feeling terrified and alone.

The third single "Pyrenees" was released on June 10, 2020.

== Critical reception ==
Heavy Nights was met with "generally favorable" reviews from critics. At Metacritic, which assigns a weighted average rating out of 100 to reviews from mainstream publications, this release received an average score of 80, based on 4 reviews. Aggregator Album of the Year gave the album 78 out of 100 based on a critical consensus of 5 reviews.

== Track listing ==
Heavy Nights track listing
No.	Title	Length
1.	"I Can Only Be Good"	4:20
2.	"Heavy Nights"	4:26
3.	"Pyrenees"	5:16
4.	"The Days Disintegrating"	5:28
5.	"You in Dreams"	4:14
6.	"My Drugs, My Dreams"	5:30
7.	"Kiss My Dreams"	5:48
8.	"Halfway to the Moon"	3:16
