= And I Thank You =

Studio album by The Elwins
- Released: February 21, 2012
- Recorded: Bear Creek Studio, Woodinville, Washington
- Genre: Indie rock, retro pop
- Length: 28:18
- Producer: Ryan Hadlock

And I Thank You is the first full-length album by Canadian indie rock band The Elwins. Before its release on February 21, 2012, it was named among the top 20 most anticipated Canadian albums of 2012 by Exclaim! The single "Come on Out" was the number one song on CBC Radio 3's The R3-30 chart for the week of June 9, 2012.

== Production ==
The preparation, recording and release of And I Thank You spanned several years. The ten tracks that would eventually form the album were written as part of an exercise by the band wherein each member would write a new song every week, which yielded a catalog of about 50 total songs. The band traveled to Philadelphia to work with producer Bill Moriarty, who assisted them in expanding demos into full songs and in refining their sound. After this pre-production, the band recorded fourteen songs at Bear Creek Studio near Seattle with producer Ryan Hadlock from late October to early November 2010, and of those 14, ten were chosen for inclusion on the album and mixed by producer L. Stu Young in Toronto during February and March 2011. After production was complete, the band explored the possibility of releasing the album with a record label, but eventually decided to release the album independently.

== Reception ==
And I Thank You received favourable reviews from critics. It was praised for its "sunshiny" and "jaunty" rhythm and "fun" melodies that are simple but still interesting "even after the third or fourth listen". Several reviewers noted the band's retro sound, especially reminiscent of The Beach Boys, though with "subtle modern twists".

Rob Duffy of The Grid gave the album a rating of 8/10, commenting that

The band’s innate pop sensibility marries ’60s-inspired guitar licks with a similarly nostalgic talent for weaving innocent tales of life and love, the kind of magic that makes And I Thank You that rare pop-rock album where the verses are as breathlessly catchy and delightful as the choruses ... Even as they mine vast deposits of pure and polished melodies, The Elwins flawlessly execute songwriting virtues like variation and pacing, a natural talent that puts them a country mile ahead of so many of their peers. Get acquainted with them now, because they’re destined to soar.

Daniel Korn of Cadence Canada also noted the band's unique sound, stating that the band "fits quite easily into the indie-rock paradigm, but they have their own style that feels rather effortless." However, he criticized the album's production, calling it "muddy" and "oddly lo-fi".

== Track listing ==
1. "Come on Out" – 3:32
2. "Stuck in the Middle" – 2:57
3. "Behind My Eyes" – 2:49
4. "Forgetful Assistance" – 2:40
5. "Paper in Your Pocket" – 2:33
6. "On Your Doorstep" – 1:57
7. "Are You Flying With a Different Bird?" – 2:09
8. "Propinquity" – 3:32
9. "I Miss You and I" – 3:15
10. "Sittin' Pretty" – 2:54

== Personnel ==
- Jherek Bischoff – double bass, violin, cello
- Feurd – guitar, keyboard
- Paris Hurley – violin
- Heather Lumsden-Ruegg – backup vocals
- Kimo Muraki – lap steel, ukulele, trumpet, mellophone, recorder, saxophone
- Travis Stokl – drums
- Matthew Sweeney – vocals, guitar
