= Great Bloomers =

Canadian folk rock band

Great Bloomers were a Canadian folk rock band from Toronto, Ontario, active in the late 2000s and early 2010s.

The band's core member was Lowell Sostomi on lead vocals, guitar and harmonica, with various supporting musicians including Nate Hindle, Andrew Kekewich, Ty Rowles, Tim Moxam, Shawn Dell, Tony McKnight, John Spence and Kyle Watt on different recordings.

They released their self-titled debut EP in 2007, and followed up with the album Speak of Trouble in 2009. In the same year, they also contributed the non-album track "Find My Way" to the compilation album Friends in Bellwoods II, and recorded a live version of the album track "This Ain't You" to the Audio Recording Academy's Secret Sessions recording project. The album also earned special praise from Canadian singer-songwriter Gordon Lightfoot, who called it "a very rich sounding, contemporary rock album with depth and variety" that was "a joy to listen to".

In 2012 they toured Eastern Canada as an opening act for The Wooden Sky, and released their second and final album, Distant Sky, on Dine Alone Records.

They announced their breakup in 2013, performing a farewell show at The Horseshoe Tavern on November 16 featuring the participation of every former member of the band.

Sostomi was later active with the projects Only Yours and CIVIC TV.
