= Joshua Hyslop =

- Born: Christopher Joshua Hyslop; Saskatoon, Saskatchewan, Canada
- Origin: Vancouver, British Columbia
- Genres: Pop; folk
- Occupations: Musician; singer-songwriter
- Instruments: Vocals; guitar; banjo; mandolin; ukulele
- Years active: 2011–present
- Label: Nettwerk Music Group
- Website: www.joshuahyslop.com

Christopher Joshua Hyslop (born 1987) is a Canadian folk singer-songwriter, signed to Nettwerk Records. Hyslop released his debut EP, Cold Wind, on Nettwerk in 2011.

His first full-length debut album Where the Mountain Meets the Valley, was released on July 3, 2012, to much critical acclaim. A preview single, "What Have I Done?", was released in March 2012.

He spent the better part of 2012–2014 touring and writing his next record. Some of the album was written in Nashville, then finished back in Canada; he released his full-length record In Deepest Blue on October 23, 2015.

Hyslop's third album Echos was released on February 23, 2018.

After touring around Canada for a month in early 2020, Hyslop released an EP titled Embers on February the same year. Hyslop's fourth album Ash & Stone was released on September 11, 2020.

== Discography ==
=== Studio albums ===
Title	Album details	Peak chart positions
Title	Album details	CAN
Where the Mountain Meets the Valley	Released: May 15, 2012; Label: Nettwerk Records; Format: CD, digital download	176
In Deepest Blue	Released: October 21, 2016; Label: Nettwerk Records; Format: CD, digital download, vinyl	—
Echos	Released: February 23, 2018; Label: Nettwerk Records; Format: CD, digital download, vinyl	—
Ash & Stone	Released: September 11, 2020; Label: Nettwerk Records; Format: CD, digital download, vinyl	—

=== Extended plays ===
Title	EP details
Cold Wind	Released: June 21, 2011; Label: Nettwerk; Format: CD, digital download
Living & Dying	Released: February 17, 2015; Label: Nettwerk; Format: CD, digital download
O Holy Night	Released: November 3, 2017; Label: Nettwerk; Format: CD, digital download

=== Singles ===
Title	Year	Peak chart positions	Album
Title	Year	CAN	Album
"The Spark"	2016	—	Where the Mountain Meets the Valley
"Wells"	2016	—	non-album single
"Fall"	2017	—	Echos
"Say It Again"	2017	—	Echos
"Home"	2018	—	Echos
"No Roots"	2019	—	non-album single
"Something More"	2019	—	non-album single
"Behind the Light"	2019	—	non-album single
"Gentle Heart"	2020	—	Ash & Stone
"Such Bitter Ends"	2020	—	Ash & Stone
"Let It Rain"	2020	—	Ash & Stone
"Leavings"	2020	—	Ash & Stone
