= The Doc Project =

- Genre: documentary
- Running time: 27:30 minutes
- Country of origin: Canada
- Language: English
- Home station: CBC Radio One
- Hosted by: Acey Rowe
- Original release: 2015 – 2022
- Audio format: Monophonic
- Website: Official website

The Doc Project was a Canadian podcast and radio program, which aired weekly on CBC Radio One. Hosted by Casey Mecija for its first season and then Acey Rowe for subsequent seasons, the program aired radio documentaries, essays, and first person stories each week. Rowe was also a story editor and co-producer on the show alongside producer Julia Pagel.

The program debuted in May 2015 as a short-run summer series, and was subsequently extended as part of Radio One's permanent regular season schedule in September. Originally the program was a platform for acquired documentaries and documentaries made through the CBC's Doc Project Mentorship Program. The pieces were sometimes followed by an interview with the documentarian about the process of making the documentary feature. After its first season, the program was expanded to include commissioned documentaries and co-productions with CBC audio journalists across Canada. In June 2022 Rowe announced that the show was ending after seven years.
