= Free Dimensional =

Studio album by Diamond Rings
- Released: October 23, 2012
- Recorded: 2012
- Genre: Indie Rock, Indie Pop, Synthpop
- Length: 41:25
- Label: Secret City Records
- Producer: Damian Taylor, Diamond Rings

Diamond Rings chronology
Special Affections (2010)	Free Dimensional (2012)

Professional ratings
Aggregate scores
Source	Rating
Metacritic	65/100
Review scores
Source	Rating
AllMusic	4/5 stars
Exclaim.ca	8/10
PopMatters	7/10 stars
Pitchfork Media	5.8/10
Tiny Mix Tapes	4/5 stars
Toronto Star	3/4 stars

Free Dimensional, released on October 23, 2012, is the second and final studio album from Canadian musician Diamond Rings (real name: John O'Regan).

According to O'Regan, his Diamond Rings persona exists "to sort of smash that kind of tendency that I think we all have to sort of hide behind ourselves. And I think this record's probably, or definitely, my strongest statement that I've made to date." He also says a big part of this album was "becoming more comfortable as a musician and a composer and an arranger", and "I felt like I really stepped up as a singer with this album, and I’m really proud of that.”

O'Regan has stated that this album is more polished than Special Affections, but "I didn’t really change my approach lyrically or emotionally. I feel like they’re still conveying the same message, but just coated in a way that has a few more layers of gloss. It’s like we spent a two more hours waxing the car." He attributes the album's heavier dance orientation to his unique recording set-up: "I had a sit-down desk and I got rid of it cause I started working all day on these songs and I started feeling really sluggish, like I was a banker or something. So I got rid of the desk, put my computer up, and started recording like that. And it just all has a more dance-ready feel because I was dancing when I was making it!"

O'Regan has compared Special Affections to Free Dimensional: "The old album is more introspective, whereas Free Dimensional seems outrospective. It's got all this energy coming out of it."

== Track listing ==
No.	Title	Length
1.	"Everything Speaks"	3:17
2.	"All The Time"	3:20
3.	"Runaway Love"	4:50
4.	"Put Me On"	5:12
5.	"I'm Just Me"	4:35
6.	"Hand Over My Heart"	4:40
7.	"(I Know) What I'm Made Of"	3:46
8.	"A To Z"	4:00
9.	"Stand My Ground"	4:00
10.	"Day & Night"	3:49
