= Purple Hill =

Protected area in Kent, England

Coordinates: 51.330°N 0.600°E

- Site of Special Scientific Interest
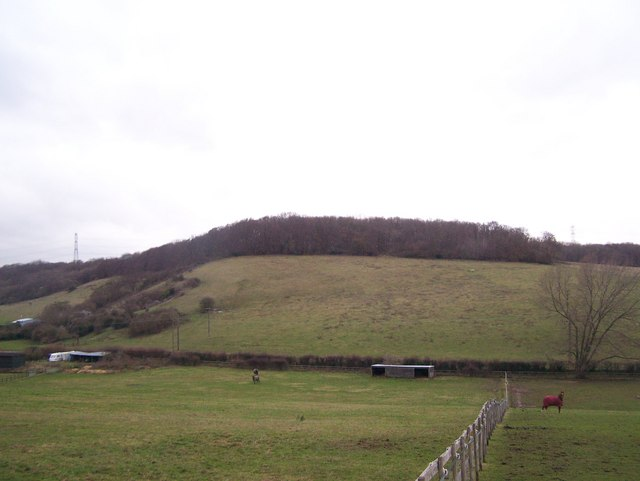
- Location of Purple Hill.
- Area of search: Kent
- Grid reference: TQ 812 622
- Interest: Biological
- Area: 14.9 hectares (37 acres)
- Notification date: 1984
- Location map: Magic Map

Purple Hill is a 14.9-hectare (37-acre) biological Site of Special Scientific Interest south of Gillingham in Kent. It is a Nature Conservation Review site, Grade 2.

This chalk downland site has herb-rich grassland, scrub and woods. Flora include the nationally rare Kentish milkwort and several uncommon orchids.

The site is private land with no public access.
