= The Elwins =

Canadian rock band

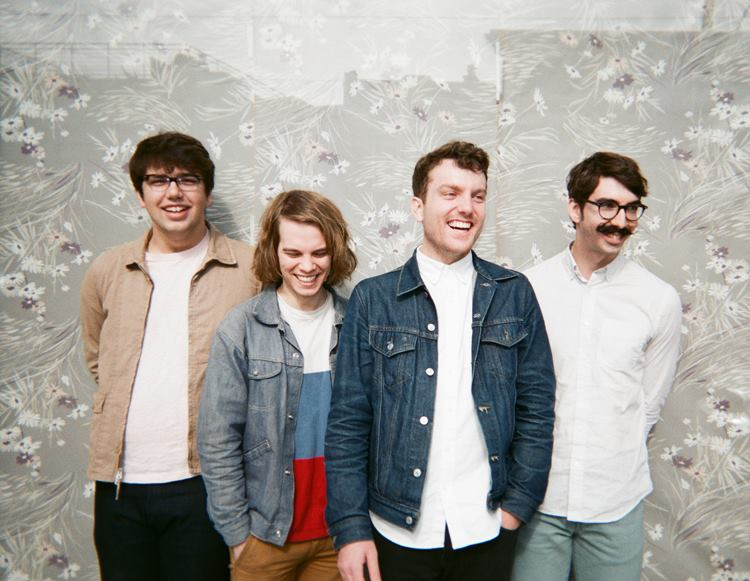
- Press Photo By Vanessa Heins

Background information
- Origin: Newmarket, Ontario, Canada
- Genres: Indie rock, surf pop
- Years active: 2006–2022, 2025-Present
- Members: Matthew Sweeney; Travis Stokl; Feurd; Frankie Figliomeni
- Past members: Christopher Shannon
- Website: theelwins.com

The Elwins are a Canadian indie rock band from Keswick, Ontario, consisting of singer and guitarist Matthew Sweeney, drummer Travis Stokl, guitarist/keyboardist Feurd and bassist/singer Frankie Figliomeni.

== Biography ==
=== Early days ===
The Elwins started out as a duo playing original music in high school at Huron Heights Secondary School. They recorded their self-titled debut EP in 2008 at Chemical Sound Studios. After performing as a duo for a while, they decided to expand their sound, adding long-time friend Feurd on guitar and keyboard, and Christopher Shannon on bass. The band made a number of short videos and clips during this time drawing from comedic inspirations such as Maria Bamford, John Mulaney, and Nathan for You, which advertised local shows, handmade merchandise or their comedic chops. In November 2011, the group released a video for their song "Help a Bro Out (M-O-V-E-M-B-E-R)" aimed at raising awareness for Men's Health. The band recorded an EP titled The Elwins & Friends Volume One alongside Doctor EW and T H O M A S that was released December 25, 2011.

=== And I Thank You, 2012 ===
Their first full-length album, And I Thank You, was self-released on February 21, 2012. In early 2012, The Elwins embarked on their first US tour, in which they opened for Jukebox the Ghost and SPEAK. The tour consisted of 12 dates spanning much of the Southeastern United States and East Coast, culminating in a SXSW performance. The Elwins recorded a song for each city they played in on their March 2012 tour, lamenting each city's history and serenading about how eager they were to play there. Promotional videos for each song where directed by Christopher Shannon and published on the band's Youtube channel. The songs were compiled into a Tour Songs EP and made available on the band's Bandcamp page. In May 2012, bassist Christopher Shannon left The Elwins to co-found the band 'Bart'; he was replaced by Frankie Figliomeni.

The Elwins began their second major tour in September 2013, this time as headliners. The tour was over 40 dates–a handful of North American dates, the rest in Western Europe.

=== Play for Keeps, 2015 ===
In October 2014, the Elwins signed with North American record label Hidden Pony Records. They re-released their debut album And I Thank You on October 21 and released their sophomore album Play for Keeps on February 24, 2015. The album was released in North America under Hidden Pony Records, Affairs of the Heart in Europe, and Moorworks in Japan. The band supported the release with tours of Canada, the United States, Europe and Japan. The first single, "So Down Low", reached No. 12 overall at alternative radio in Canada. The single charted for six months and was used in a Canada-wide advertising campaign for Fido. This album saw the band move from a DIY and lo-fi sound to a more polished pop-driven sound. At the Juno Awards of 2016, The Elwins were nominated as Breakthrough Group of the Year.

=== Beauty Community, 2017 ===
On October 13, 2017, The Elwins released their third studio album, Beauty Community. The first single, "Hey! Ya, You", reached the top 10 on Canadian Alternative radio charts, peaking at number 6. They toured the record in late 2017 with Fast Romantics across Canada, followed by a winter 2018 support tour of Dashboard Confessional. Recording for the album took place shortly after the conclusion of their Play for Keeps tours. The album was produced by Derek Hoffman, who had collaborated with the band on their previous album. In spring of 2019, T-Mobile used the song "Never Felt So Good" for their North American Live Nation advertising campaign.

=== IV, 2021 ===
Following 2017's Beauty Community, The Elwins left Hidden Pony and formed their own label Pink Eye Recordings. The band began working on their fourth studio album in late 2018; they released the album's first single "Take Me All The Way" on April 3, 2020; the second single, "Weight of the World" on June 26. The album, titled IV, was released on October 23, 2020, and marks a swift departure from the innocent and optimistic lyrics of their previous albums and instead takes a more somber and introspective approach. In 2021, the band released an EP called IV More, alongside a visualizer for the new track, “For Love To Come and Find You (Don’t Wait)".

=== Break up/hiatus-reunion, 2022–present ===
The band announced in January 2022 they were disbanding, citing the inability to perform live due to the COVID-19 pandemic as the primary reason. Thankfully, in October 2024, their return was announced for the We Are Busy Bodies 20 year anniversary showcase which took place March 2025 in Toronto, Ontario marking the first live performance for The Elwins since 2021. The band also surprise released the single "Isle Of My Own" which coincided with the date of their live return. The band has since posted studio updates hinting at new music being made and another live show in Toronto in August 2025.

== Discography ==
Studio albums

- And I Thank You (February 21, 2012)
- Play for Keeps (February 24, 2015)
- Beauty Community (October 13, 2017)
- IV (October 23, 2020)

Extended plays

- The Elwins EP (April 10, 2009)
- The Elwins & Friends Volume One (December 25, 2011)
- Tour Songs (March 13, 2012)
- IV More (April 9, 2021)

Singles

- Countdown (Feat. Luke Lalonde)/Behind My Eyes (April 21, 2012)
- Stuck in the Middle (April 22, 2012)
- Forgetful Assistance/Countdown (April 3, 2013)
- Hello (Adele Cover) (November 30, 2015)
- Hey! Ya, You (August 16, 2017)
- Party All the Time (June 29, 2018)
- With All Your Friends (December 11, 2018)
- Some Things Last a Long Time (October 12, 2019)
- Take Me All The Way (April 3, 2020)
- Weight of the World (June 26, 2020)
- For Love To Come and Find You (Don’t Wait) (April 9, 2021)

=== Chart performance ===
Year	Song	Alternative Canada	Billboard Canadian Rock	Album
2015	"So Down Low"	12	29	Play For Keeps
2015	"Show Me How to Move"	22	–	Play For Keeps
2017	"Hey! Ya, You"	6	19	Beauty Community
2017	"Never Felt So Good"	-	43	Beauty Community
2020	"Take Me All The Way"	10	23	IV
2020	"Weight of The World"	–	–	IV

== Awards ==
=== Juno Awards ===
The Juno Awards, more popularly known as the JUNOS, are awards presented annually to Canadian musical artists and bands to acknowledge their artistic and technical achievements in all aspects of music. New members of the Canadian Music Hall of Fame are also inducted as part of the awards ceremonies. The Juno Awards are often referred to as the equivalent of the Grammy Awards given in the United States.

Year	Nominee / work	Award	Result
2016	The Elwins	Breakthrough Group of the Year	Nominated
