= Chad Price (Canadian musician) =

Canadian musician

- Born: Chad Oliver Price; April 16, 1986 (age 40); London, Ontario, Canada
- Genres: Soul, Folk, R&B, Pop
- Occupations: singer, songwriter, guitarist
- Instruments: Guitar, vocals
- Years active: 2012–present
- Label: independent
- Website: chadpricemusic.com

Chad Oliver Price is a Canadian singer-songwriter, guitarist, and recording artist from London, Ontario. He has released three studio albums to date: In This Dream (2012), his self-titled album Chad Price (2017), and Introversion (2022). He won CBC Music's 2022 national Searchlight Prize.

== Early life ==
Price was born in London, Ontario as the youngest of three boys. He comes from a multiracial background of predominantly Black Canadian and African American descent. He attended Brock University in St. Catharine's, Ontario which Chad credits as a crucial part of his musical origins.

== Career ==
Price has released three full length studio albums, In This Dream (2012, self-released), the self-titled Chad Price (2017, self-released), and Introversion (2022, self-released). He has also won and been nominated for several music awards and was named the winner of CBC Music's 2022 Toyota Searchlight Prize. CBC Music named Price's song "Somehow, Someway" as one of the top 100 Canadian songs of 2022. The song also reached #11 on CBC Music's Top 20. Price took part in the 2023 JUNO Awards in Edmonton, Alberta and performed during Junofest.

== Awards ==
Year	Award	Result
2022	CBC Searchlight Prize	* Won

== Discography ==
- In This Dream (LP, released March 6, 2012)
- Chad Price (LP, released January 27, 2017)
- Introversion (LP, released August 25, 2022)
