= Diamond Rings (musician) =

Canadian artist and musician

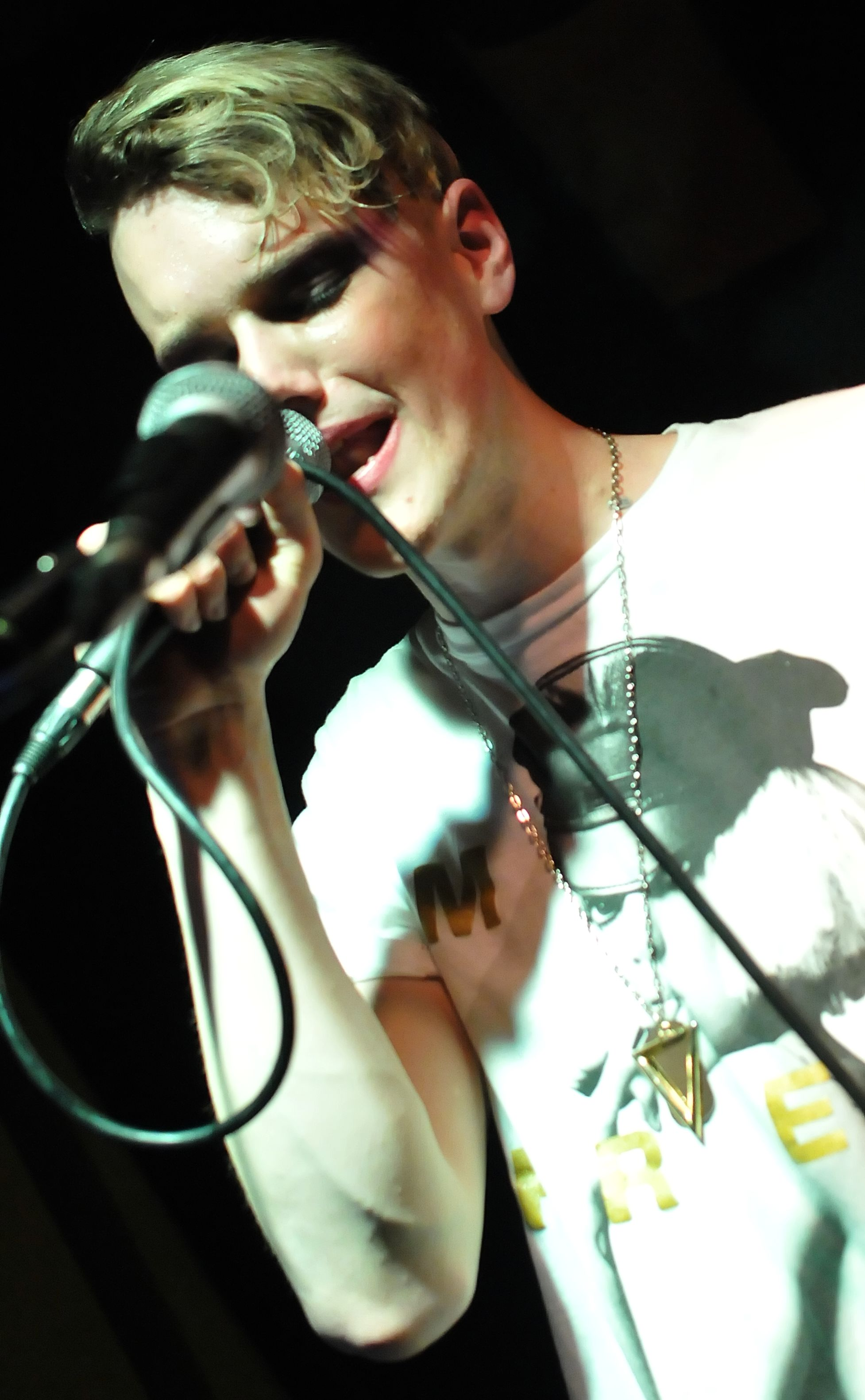
- Diamond Rings in 2010

Background information
- Born: John O'Regan; July 6, 1985 (age 41)
- Origin: Toronto, Ontario, Canada
- Genres: Pop; indie pop; electronic; synthpop; indie rock
- Years active: 2009–2013
- Labels: Astralwerks; Secret City Records; Tomlab; One Big Silence; Hype Lighter
- Formerly of: The D'Urbervilles
- Website: diamondringsmusic.com

John O'Regan (born July 6, 1985) is a Canadian artist and musician. He is best known by his stage name Diamond Rings.

== Music career ==
=== Early years in the D'Urbervilles and Habitat ===
O'Regan got his start in music as one of the founding members of post-punk quartet the D'Urbervilles (renamed Matters in 2011), where he was known as John O alongside Tim Bruton, Kyle Donnelly and Greg Santilly.

O'Regan also formed the Casio-pop duo Habitat in 2006 with his partner at the time, Sylvie Smith of The Barmitzvah Brothers.

=== Solo career (2008–2010) ===
O'Regan began writing Diamond Rings songs in the summer of 2008 after graduating with a degree in Studio Arts from the University of Guelph. The inception of the new moniker and his earliest songs were written during a lengthy hospital stay while being diagnosed and treated for Crohn's disease.

According to O'Regan, the roots of Diamond Rings came from wanting to challenge people's expectations for a male pop star: "I wanted to do something that would unsettle not only me, but the audience too... I spent my whole life up to that point as an artist playing relatively nondescript indie rock. But I felt there was a part of me that really needed to get out. I wanted to express myself in ways that were beyond just musical—something that was dramatic and flamboyant and beyond myself in a way. And that became Diamond Rings."

Singles

His first release was a limited edition split 7-inch vinyl single titled "All Yr Songs" that was distributed through his own boutique label Hype Lighter in August 2009. His friends PS I Love You were featured on the opposite side of the single. A music video for "All Yr Songs" was featured by CBC Radio 3, Exclaim!, and Pitchfork Media. The music video attracted controversy in December 2009 when it was removed from YouTube at the behest of Sony/BMG on grounds of copyright infringement. Apparently this was due to confusion between O'Regan's stage name and the song "Diamond Rings" by UK based rapper and Sony UK artist Chipmunk. When word of the slip up caught on throughout the blogosphere Sony/BMG withdrew its claim and issued O'Regan and video director Colin Medley a formal apology.

In March 2010, Diamond Rings released a new 7-inch single with German label Tomlab entitled "Wait & See", which features backing vocals from Toronto musician Gentleman Reg. The B-side features a cover of Sebadoh's "On Fire". The video for "Wait & See" was premiered on Pitchfork Media in February 2010. His next single was a 12-inch Chicago House inspired dance track titled "Show Me Your Stuff", which was released in June 2010 on Fucked Up guitarist Mike Haliechuk's One Big Silence imprint. The corresponding video also featured a cameo from Fucked Up vocalist Damian Abraham and has drawn comparisons to disparate artists such as Klaus Nomi, Nirvana, and Britney Spears

=== Special Affections (2010–2011) ===
His debut full-length album, Special Affections, was released in North America on October 25, 2010, by Montreal's Secret City Records. It attracted positive reviews from Pitchfork, Exclaim!, and AllMusic, and appeared on the !earshot Top 50 Chart that month. Lead single "Something Else" was released a month prior and features a cover of the Milla Jovovich song "The Gentleman Who Fell," with string arrangements by Canadian musician and Polaris Prize winner Owen Pallett. Following the album release Diamond Rings opened for Swedish pop star Robyn for the duration of her North American Body Talk tour in the winter of 2011. He also toured with PS I Love You in support of "Leftovers," a single that was cowritten by both O'Regan and the band and released on Toronto-based Paper Bag Records.

In May 2011, Diamond Rings began a six-week remix series titled "Remix Rainbow," which was conceived as a thank-you to a select group of musicians whose recent work gave Diamond Rings a sense of new-found inspiration. Among those featured in the series were Theophilus London, Junior Boys, and Handsome Furs. The artwork for each remix represents a different color of the Diamond Rings rainbow.

Diamond Rings has since signed with New York City-based Astralwerks Records, formerly a division of Virgin/EMI Records, which rereleased Special Affections on June 21, 2011.

=== Free Dimensional (2012) ===
In May 2012, Diamond Rings was featured on the Kids On TV song "Bobby", which appears on their album "Pantheon".

Diamond Rings released his sophomore album, Free Dimensional, on October 23, 2012. He and his band appeared on the Late Show with David Letterman on October 27, 2012, to perform its first single "I'm Just Me"; they also performed the song on The Tonight Show on November 7, 2012.

The second single "Put Me On" was listed as the Free Single Of The Week on iTunes Canada during the third week of November 2012.

In support of the album, Diamond Rings toured North America with a full live band. He began as the opening act for Stars on their fall tour starting in Portland, ME on September 20, 2012; his own cross-Canada tour, accompanied by Gold & Youth, concluded in Quebec City, QC on December 8, 2012.

Diamond Rings performed as the opening act for Orchestral Manoeuvres in the Dark in North America in April and July 2013. The tour stopped in a number of U.S. cities, plus a gig in Vancouver and two shows in Toronto. He performed a number of additional solo dates during this time as well.

=== JG Ballad (2015–2017) ===
O'Regan later created music as JG Ballad.

He has not released new music in several years and has instead worked as an art director in film, with credits including Operation Avalanche, Mean Dreams, Giant Little Ones, and Castle in the Ground. He subsequently was the art director for Rumours, The Fire Inside, Dream Scenario, Infinity Pool and Firestarter, among others.

== Personal life ==
O'Regan is frequently questioned about his flamboyant persona and subjected to numerous insinuations about his personal life: "[A]s my profile grows and as more people hear my music and see my videos, it's something that I realize: people want to know more. And I guess it's up to me to really decide how much more I want to give."

He has stated that he would prefer to let his work speak for itself: "I think right now for what I'm doing, I want my music and I want my lyrics and I want the songs and what I do on stage and in my videos hopefully to speak for [themselves]... I think some of the magic and mystery in music has been lost in contemporary culture. I think we as people have lost a bit of that sense of mystery or that sense of wonderment about the world and about each other. If anything, I hope what I do can help preserve some of that."

== Discography ==
=== Albums ===
List of remix albums, with selected chart positions
Title	Album details	Peak chart positions
Title	Album details	CAN
Special Affections	Date released: October 2010; Record label: Secret City Records; Date re-released: June 2011; Record label: Astralwerks	–
Free Dimensional	Date released: October 2012; Record label: Astralwerks and Secret City Records	–

=== Singles ===
Date	Song title	b/w	Record label	Notes	Album
August 2009	"All Yr Songs"		Hype Lighter	7-inch	Special Affections
March 2010	"Wait & See"	b/w "On Fire"; Sebadoh cover	Tomlab	7-inch	Special Affections
June 2010	"Show Me Your Stuff"	b/w "You Oughta Know"	One Big Silence	12-inch	Non-album release b/w from Special Affections
September 2010	"Something Else"	b/w "Gentleman Who Fell" (Milla Jovovich cover	Secret City Records	7-inch	Special Affections
November 2011	"You & Me"	b/w "Mellow Doubt"; Teenage Fanclub cover	Astralwerks	7-inch	Special Affections
June 2012	"I'm Just Me"		Astralwerks	7-inch	Free Dimensional
June 2012	"Runaway Love"		Astralwerks		Free Dimensional

Special releases

Date	Song title	Record label	Notes	Album
March 2011	"It's Not My Party"	released by Flaunt Magazine	Flexi-disc 7-inch	Special Affections

=== Collaborations ===
Date	Song title	Credited to	Record label	Notes
March 2010	"Leftovers"	PS I Love You feat. Diamond Rings	Paper Bag Records	7-inch
May 2012	"Bobby"	Kids on TV feat. Diamond Rings & Snax	Blocks Recording Club	
