= The Vermicious Knid =

Canadian indie rock band

- Origin: Brantford, Ontario
- Genres: Indie rock, Post-hardcore
- Years active: 2000–2006
- Labels: AntiAntenna Recordings; Ford Plant Recording Co.
- Past members: Tim Ford (vocals, guitar); Ryan Stanley (guitar, vocals); Brian Ward (bass, vocals); Jesse Shanks (drums)

The Vermicious Knid was an indie rock band from Brantford, Ontario. Members were guitarists Tim Ford and Ryan Stanley, bassist Brian Ward and drummer Jesse Shanks.

== History ==
The band formed in October 2000, choosing their name from extraterrestrial creatures in Roald Dahl's novel, Charlie and the Great Glass Elevator.

The band independently released an EP We're Running Out Of Places To Drive in 2001 and the song "A Signed Photo of Anne" was included on the AntiAntenna compilation The 20 Year Design Theory, alongside The Constantines and other Canadian bands. A second EP, Days That Stand Still was released on AntiAntenna Recordings in 2002.

Their song "Every Bear's Life Guide" was included on a 2003 compilation album, and a split 7-inch record in 2005 with the Sourkeys featured "The Problem's in My Muscles".

After releasing their first and only full-length album, Smalltown Devotion/Hometown Compulsion, in 2005 they made the decision to disband, playing their final show at The Ford Plant on 10 February 2006.

Ford and Shanks later joined the band Racoon Wedding [sic] who perform in Brantford and Southwestern Ontario. Ford also operates the concert venue The Ford Plant, and a related record label The Ford Plant Recording Co. Stanley and his wife Jackie perform as a duo called Cursed Arrows.

== Discography ==
- The 20 Year Design Theory (Compilation), AntiAntenna Recordings, 1 June 2001
- Days That Stand Still (EP), AntiAntenna Recordings, 2002
- The Vermicous Knid / The Sourkeys (Split 7-inch), July 2005
- Smalltown Devotion/Hometown Compulsion, Ford Plant Recording Co., 2005
