= The City Streets =

Canadian rock and roll band (2005–2013)

- Origin: Edmonton, Alberta, Canada
- Genres: punk rock indie rock rock and roll
- Years active: 2005–2013
- Label: Clamour Records
- Members: Rick Reid (guitar/lead vocals); Matt Leddy (bass/vocals); Mark Chmilar (drums)

The City Streets were a Canadian independent rock and roll band from Edmonton, Alberta.

== History ==
The City Streets self-released their debut full-length album, These Things Happen, in 2005. The band then went on a tour of Canada and the USA. They followed with the full-length Concentrated Living and supported the album with two North American tours in 2008.

Concentrated Living entered !earshot, Canada's national campus radio chart, at No. 44 in November and also received a record number of plays on CJSR-FM, Edmonton's campus radio station.

The Jazz Age is the band's third full-length album, released in June 2010. Winter Lightning was recorded with Howard Bilerman (Arcade Fire, Godspeed You Black Emperor) at Hotel2Tango in Montreal and released simultaneously with Sawdust & Rum which was recorded and produced by the band themselves in a cabin in Nova Scotia. Winter Lightning was released on vinyl and Sawdust & Rum on CD.

Other releases include the EP's Peacemaker with Myrol and Decline of the West.

In 2012, the band released a video, "Tristesse". The City Streets announced their breakup spring of 2013.

== Discography ==
=== Albums ===
- These Things Happen (2005)
- Concentrated Living (2008)
- The Jazz Age (2010)
- Winter Lightning (2012)
- Sawdust & Rum (2012)
- Pretenders (2013)

=== EPs ===
- If You Don't Like the Clash You're A Bad Person (2006)
- Movies Are For Retards 7" (2008)
- The Hipster Cull (2009)
- Decline of the West (2011)
- Peacemaker (2011)

== See also ==
- Music of Canada
- Canadian rock
- List of bands from Canada
- List of Canadian musicians
- Category:Canadian musical groups
