= Forest City Lovers =

Canadian folk indie pop band

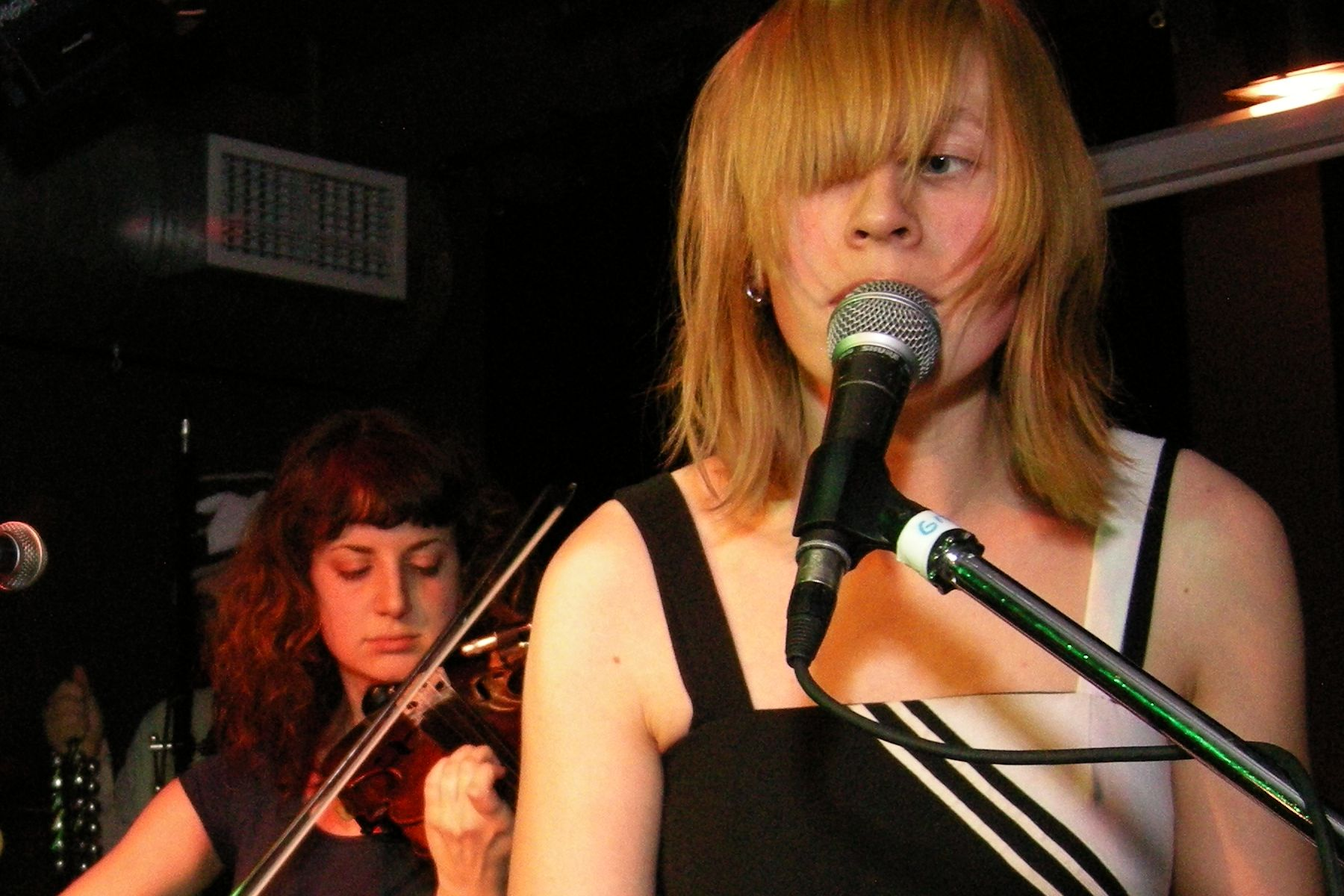
- Forest City Lovers — Mika Posen (violin) and Kat Burns — in Guelph, Ontario

Background information
- Origin: Toronto, Ontario, Canada
- Genres: Indie pop, folk
- Years active: 2006–2012
- Label: Out of This Spark
- Members: Kat Burns; Mika Posen; Kyle Donnelly; Christian Ingelevics; Timothy Bruton
- Website: forestcitylovers.com

Forest City Lovers are a Canadian folk indie pop band formed in 2006 in Toronto, Ontario. The band is centred on the songwriting of singer and guitarist Kat Burns. She is backed by violinist Mika Posen, bassist Kyle Donnelly, keyboardist Timothy Burton and drummer Christian Ingelevics.

== Biography ==
Forest City Lovers began as the solo project of singer-songwriter Kat Burns, from Whitby, Ontario, when she moved to Toronto to go to school in 2005 and began to play around the city. Soon after establishing herself as a talented young songwriter, Burns released her independent solo EP For the Birds in early 2005.

Collecting close friends and peers she assembled Forest City Lovers over the period of recording at the House of Miracles with Andy Magoffin. Original band members included James Bunton and Andrew Kinoshita on drums and bass. She released The Sun and the Wind, independently in 2006 under the Forest City Lovers moniker. The single "Castles!" was playlisted on CBC Radio 3 and the album charted quite high nationally after its release. In 2007, Mika Posen joined the band on violin. The band contributed a track, "Don't Go, Please", to the charity compilation Friends in Bellwoods. In late 2007, Bunton and Kinoshita were replaced by Paul Weadick and Kyle Donnelly on drums and bass.

The Sun and the Wind fared well on campus radio stations across Canada and the United States, and garnered airplay on CBC Radio One, CBC Radio 2 and CBC Radio 3. The band toured extensively and secured fans far outside of their Toronto home. The band was called a "Band to look out for" in 2008 by eye weekly, the "best band you've never heard of" by Spin, and a "mess of cute girls and boys who sing about life in Toronto" by Nylon.

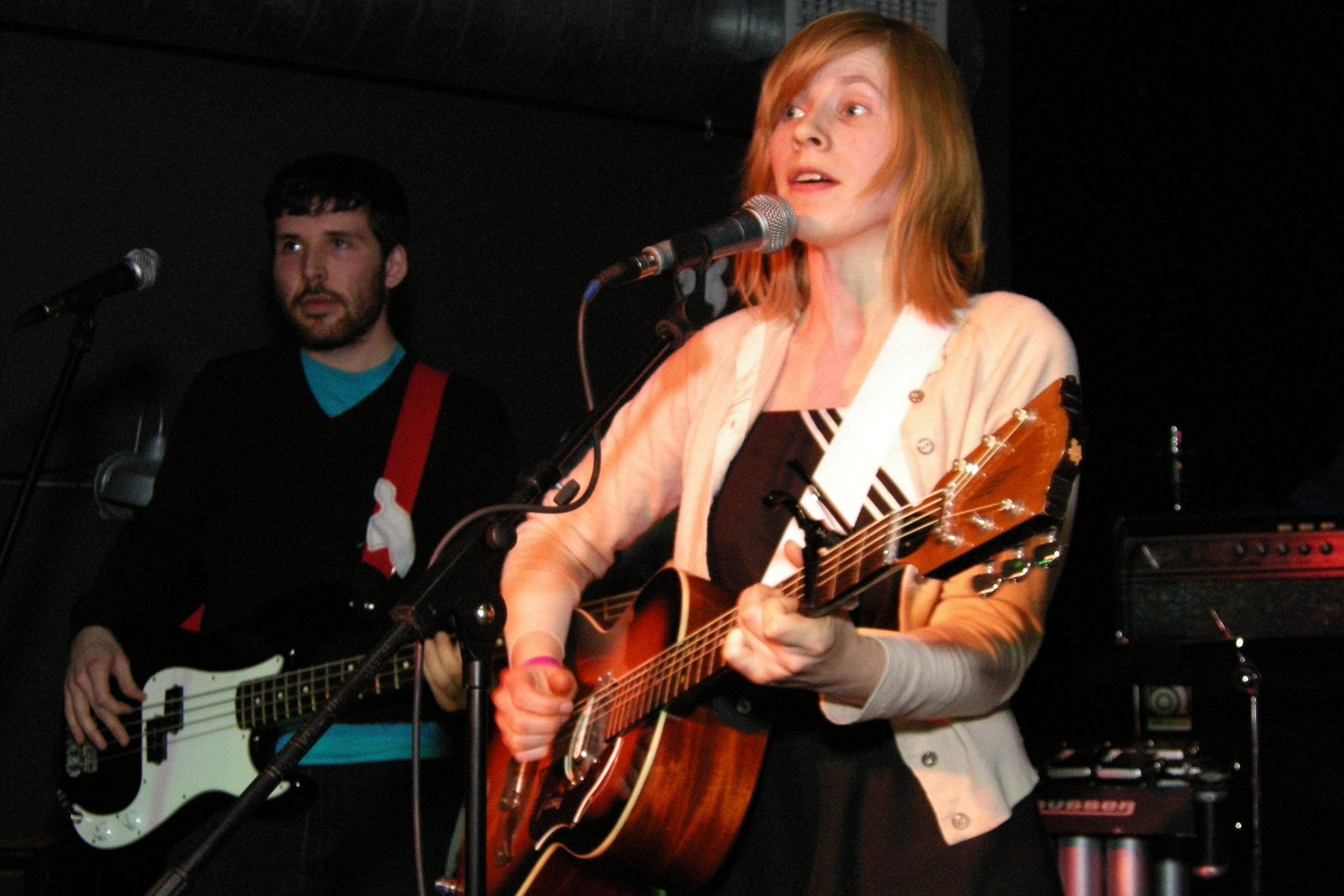
Donnelly and Burns in Guelph, Ontario.

In 2008, the band released their debut full-length, Haunting Moon Sinking, on Out of This Spark. The album did very well nationally and internationally, garnering press and airplay around the world. The entire album was played heavily on CBC's Radio One, Radio 2, and Radio 3, as well as North American campus radio and NPR. Shortly after the release of the album drummer Paul Weadick left the band. He has since been replaced.

Since the release of The Sun and the Wind in 2006, Forest City Lovers have played numerous festivals, including the Hillside Festival in Guelph, Ontario; the inaugural Sled Island Music Festival in Calgary, Alberta; Sappyfest in Sackville, New Brunswick; Keep It Cool in Lecce, Italy; and Folk on the Rocks in Yellowknife, Northwest Territories. The band were among the contributors to two compilation CDs, Friends in Bellwoods, and Friends in Bellwoods II, as a benefit for Toronto's Daily Bread Food Bank.

Forest City Lovers are nationally distributed through Arts & Crafts after a partnership with their Toronto label Out of This Spark. Previously the disc was distributed by Sonic Unyon. The band released a 7" single in November 2009 and recently completed Carriage, their second album for Out of this Spark, released on June 29, 2010. Carriage has been met with massive critical acclaim.

In 2011, Forest City Lovers were nominated for The 10th Annual Independent Music Awards in the Indie/Alt./Hard Rock Album category.

On March 27, 2012, in an emotional statement, Kat Burns announced via the band's website that she was putting Forest City Lovers on indefinite hiatus in order to let the band do their own individual things, including her solo project KASHKA.

== Members ==
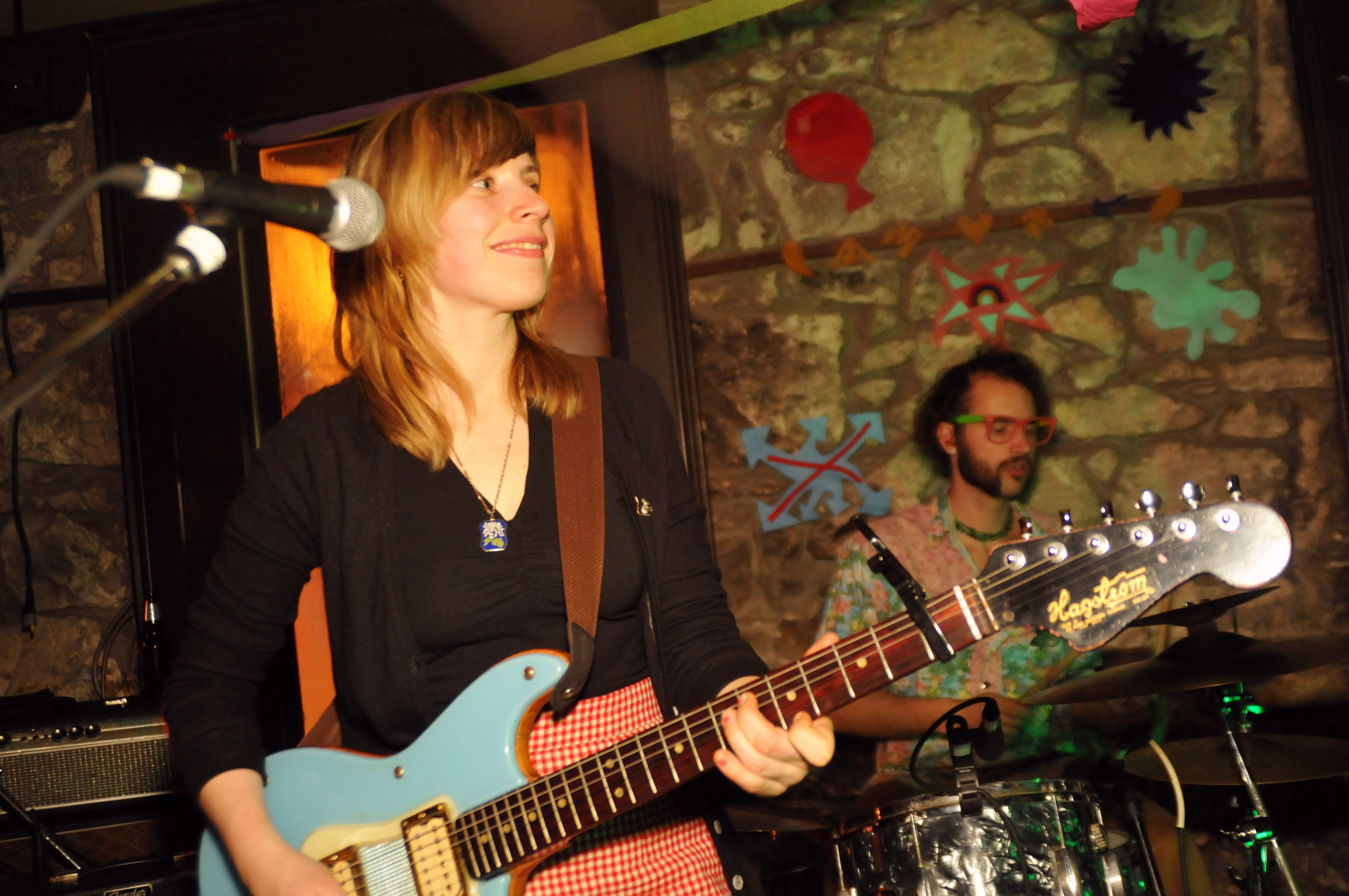
Burns and Ingelevics in Guelph.

- Kat Burns – songwriter, vocals, guitar, piano, banjo, glockenspiel
- Mika Posen – violin, viola, piano, bg vocals
- Kyle Donnelly – bass, guitar, glockenspiel, bg vocals
- Christian Ingelevics – drums
- Timothy Bruton – keyboards, guitar, vocals

== Discography ==
- For the Birds (Kat Burns solo) - 2005 - Independent / Play the Triangle
- The Sun and the Wind - 2006 - Independent / Play the Triangle
- Haunting Moon Sinking - 2008 - Out of This Spark / Arts & Crafts
- Carriage - 2010 - Out of This Spark / Arts & Crafts
