= Out of This Spark =

Canadian independent record label

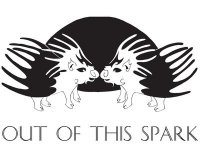
- Founded: 2006
- Founder: Stuart Duncan
- Genre: Indie
- Country of origin: Canada
- Location: Toronto, Ontario
- Official website: outofthisspark.com

Out of this Spark is an independent record label founded in the fall of 2006 by Stuart Duncan in Toronto, Ontario, Canada. The label is an artist-focused label that works to release fun, exciting and innovative music, with a focus a facilitating the distribution of music to the masses for musicians in a participatory fashion. The label is different in the sense that they do not own any of their artists' master recordings or publishing rights.

Out of this Spark's first release was a 2007 benefit compilation for the Daily Bread Food Bank, entitled Friends in Bellwoods.

Recently Out of this Spark joined Arts & Crafts in a distribution deal for North America.

== Discography ==
1. Various Artists - Friends in Bellwoods (2007)
2. The D'Urbervilles - We Are the Hunters (2008)
3. Forest City Lovers - Haunting Moon Sinking (2008)
4. Jenny Omnichord - Charlotte or Otis: Duets for Children, Their Parents and Other People Too (2008)
5. Timber Timbre - Timber Timbre (2009)
6. Various Artists - Friends in Bellwoods II (2009)
7. Evening Hymns - Spirit Guides (2009)
8. Forest City Lovers - Carriage (2010)
9. Snowblink - Long Live (2011)
10. Tasseomancy - Ulalume (2011)
