= Casey Mecija =

- Born: Casey Nicole Mecija; November 5, 1981 (age 44); Brantford, Ontario, Canada
- Education: PhD student, University of Toronto
- Occupations: Artist, Musician
- Known for: Music, Film, Academics, Community Organizing
- Partner: Hannah Dyer
- Website: http://www.caseymecija.com

Casey Mecija is a multi-disciplinary artist, academic and musician. She is active in Toronto's music and cultural scene.

== Early life ==
Casey Mecija was born and raised in Brantford, Ontario. She is of Filipino descent. Mecija has been based in Toronto, Ontario since moving there to attend university.

== Career ==
Casey Mecija joined the Department of Communication & Media Studies at York University as an Assistant Professor in August 2020. She holds a PhD from the University of Toronto. Before arriving to academia, she was (and remains) involved in music scenes and multi-disciplinary arts.

In the mid 2000s, Mecija contributed to turning her home on Bellwoods Avenue into a community hub for young artists and musicians. In part driven by a push back against an industry driven by capital and market trends, the space was focused on collaboration and collectivity. She hosted concerts in her basement, showcasing and supporting emerging artists, many of whom have become notable musicians. She co-founded the Friends in Bellwoods music project, which has raised thousands of dollars for the Daily Bread Food Bank of Toronto.

Simultaneously, she was the lead vocalist and songwriter for Ohbijou, an orchestral-pop band which toured internationally and acquired large amounts of popularity. Ohbijou was born of the ethos of the home, foregrounding friendship with a desire to make art and music that inspired social change. In 2013, Ohbijou went on hiatus as they grappled with the reality of their own involvement in the industry they hoped to shirk. At that time, Mecija shifted focus towards producing scholarship about diaspora, queer theory, sound studies, and aesthetics.

== Recent work ==
Mecija continues to make music under her own name, releasing her first solo album, Psychic Materials in early 2016. A return to the DIY aesthetic that inspired her initial pursuits, the album addresses ideas surrounding queerness, diaspora, history, and love.

She is also an award-winning filmmaker, her work being screened internationally and at the Toronto Reel Asian International Film Festival where she was awarded the WIFT-T Award (Women in Film and Television), as well as at Inside Out Film and Video Festival. She is also the host of the Canadian Broadcasting Corporation's (CBC) program, The Doc Project.

She holds a Masters in Communication Studies and completed her PhD at The University of Toronto in the Women and Gender Studies program in 2020. Her research focuses on art, media, and aesthetics as they relate to immigration and diaspora.

== Discography ==
- Psychic Materials (2016)
