= Daily Bread Food Bank =

Canadian charity

- Abbreviation: DBFB
- Type: charity organization
- Legal status: active
- Purpose: advocate and public voice, educator and network
- Headquarters: Toronto, Ontario
- Location: Toronto, Ontario
- Region served: Greater Toronto Area
- Official language: English; French
- Website: www.dailybread.ca

Daily Bread Food Bank (DBFB) is a Canadian charity organization with a stated goal of ending hunger in Toronto by collaborating with all to eliminate food insecurity and advocate for solutions to end poverty. Founded in 1983, the organization is based in Toronto, Ontario, and is one of the largest food bank organizations in Canada.

Daily Bread distributes fresh and shelf-stable food, as well as fresh-cooked meals, to over 200 food programs at 129 member agencies across Toronto. Its network of agencies serviced nearly 3 million client visits in 2023.

== Research and advocacy ==
Daily Bread Food Bank (in partnership with North York Harvest Food Bank) also publishes the influential Who's Hungry report, a profile of food insecurity in the City of Toronto. This annual survey measures trends in food insecurity and poverty in Toronto to educate the public and spark policy change.

== See also ==
- List of food banks
