= Ohbijou =

Canadian indie pop band

Ohbjiou
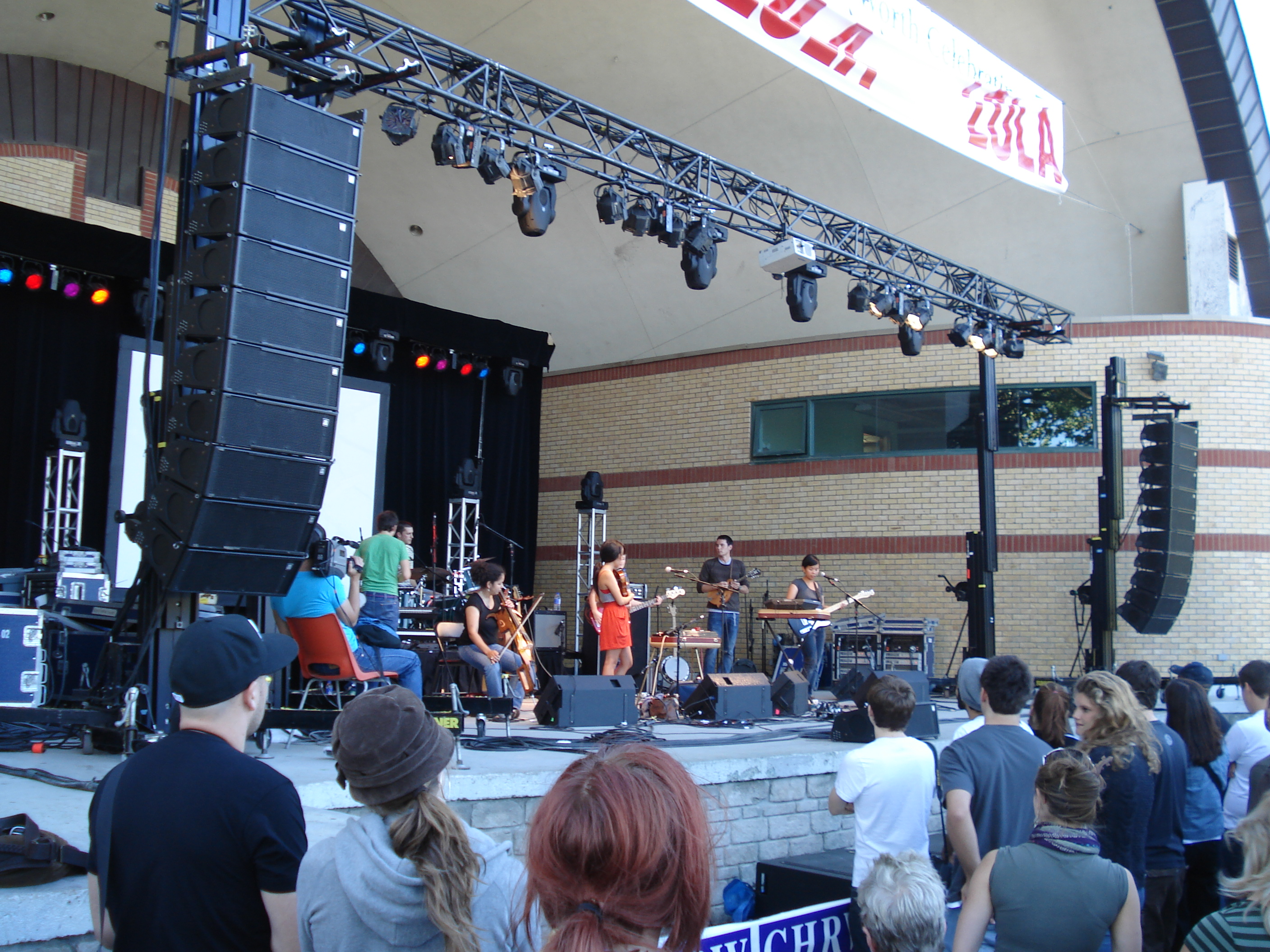
- Ohbijou performing in 2007 in London, Ontario.

Background information
- Origin: Toronto, Ontario, Canada
- Genres: Indie, pop, folk
- Years active: 2004–2013
- Members: Casey Mecija, Jennifer Mecija, Heather Kirby, James Bunton, Anissa Hart, Ryan Carley, Andrew Kinoshita

Ohbijou was a Canadian indie pop band that was based in Toronto, Ontario. The music of Ohbijou draws on pop, folk, and bluegrass influences.

== History ==
Ohbijou began as the solo project of Brantford singer-songwriter Casey Mecija. (She also works as a production assistant at MuchMusic.) Casey began composing her own songs, taking inspiration from Canadian songwriter Julie Doiron. She invited her sister Jennifer Mecija, to assist with her early performances. The Mecija sisters later moved to Toronto to attend Ryerson University and the Ontario College of Art and Design, respectively.

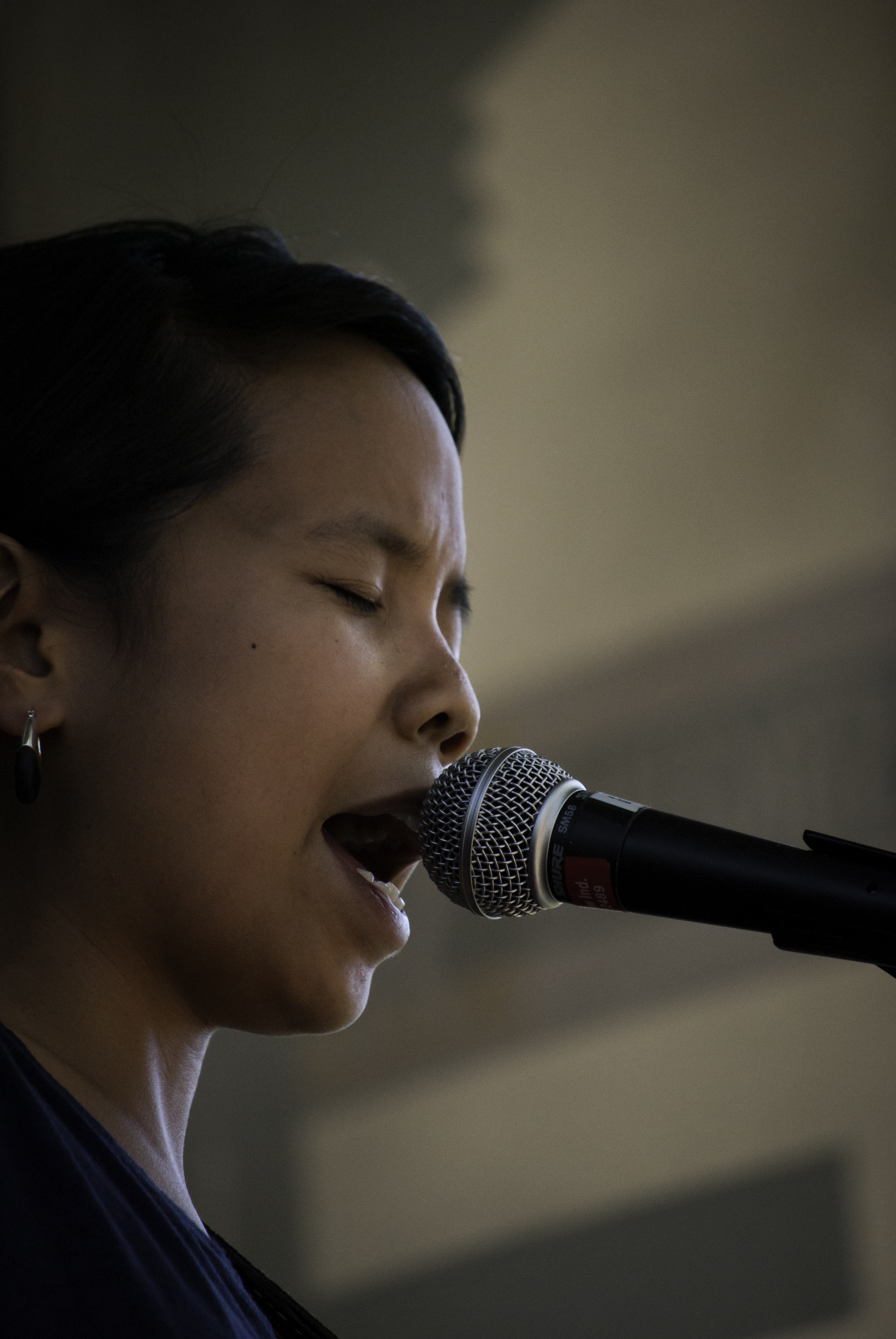
Casey Mecija performing at the Calgary Folk Festival in 2010

In 2004, the sisters joined with Heather Kirby (bass, banjo), James Bunton (drums, trumpet), Anissa Hart (cello), Ryan Carley (piano, synth, glockenspiel, electric piano, harpsichord), and Andrew Kinoshita (mandolin) to form the band Ohbijou. In the context of Ohbijou, Casey remains as lead vocalist, though also plays guitar, piano, and ukulele. Jennifer continues to add vocal layering, moreover, her instrumental contributions to Ohbijou include violin, harmochord, glockenspiel, organ and melodica.

The music of Ohbijou has been described as being similar to Bic Runga and Mazzy Star, and called "hushed, heart-tugging music".

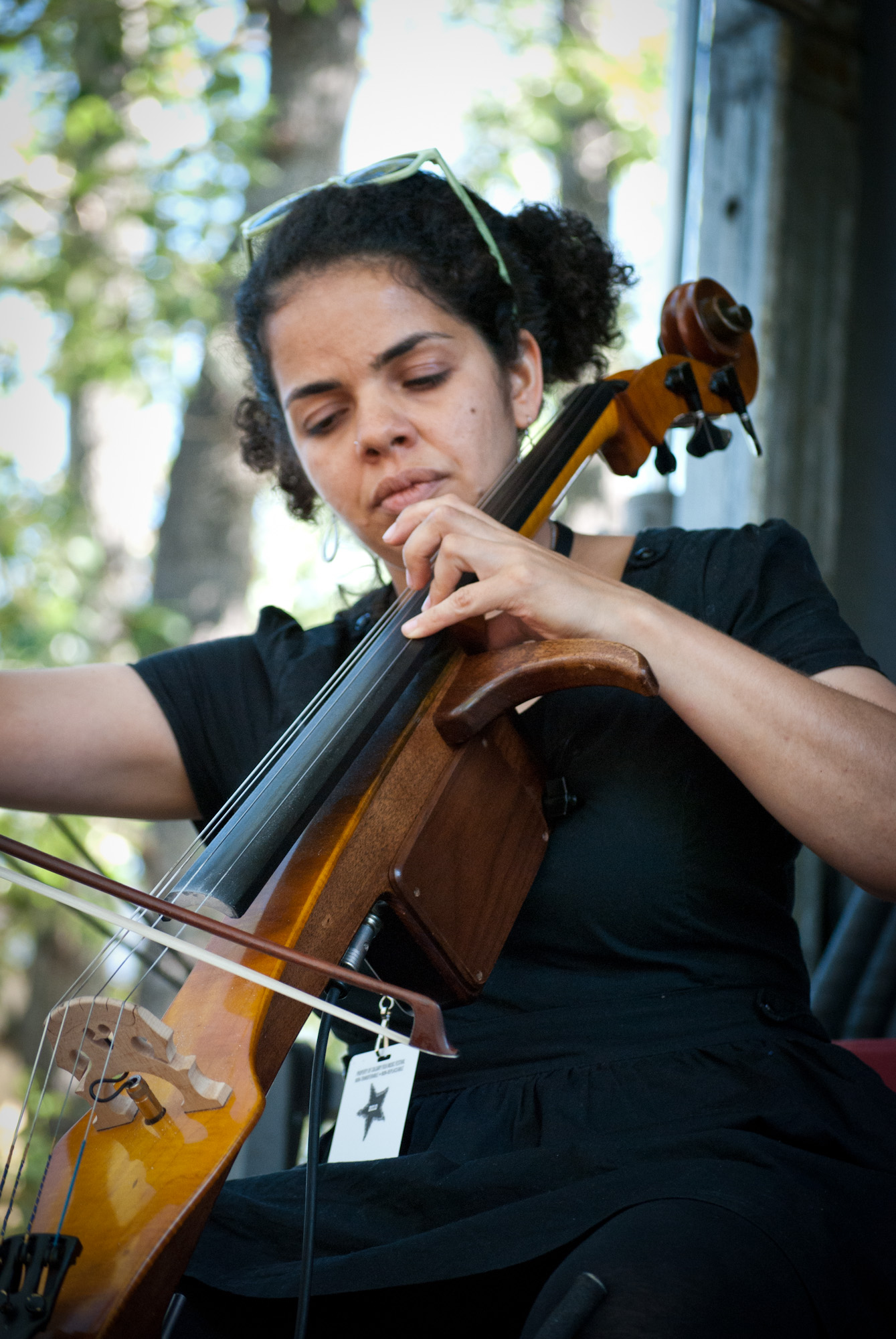
Anissa Hart performing at the Calgary Folk Festival in 2010

Ohbijou released their debut album, Swift Feet for Troubling Times, in 2006. They played festivals across Canada, including the Osheaga Festival in Montreal and the Hillside Festival in Guelph. They played the opening set for the Virgin Festival in Toronto, and were nominated for the 2007 Galaxie Rising Stars Award of the CBC, competing with IllScarlett, Final Fantasy and Emily Haines of Metric. The band were among the organizers of a 2007 compilation CD, Friends in Bellwoods — based out of Mecija's Bellwoods Ave. Toronto home and practice space for Ohbijou and their friends — as a benefit for Toronto's Daily Bread Food Bank. In 2008, they were chosen as one of three bands for the Banff Centre's first Indie Band Residency, where they had the opportunity to spend two weeks working with producers and recording engineers.

Their music has been playlisted on CBC Radio 3. Their song "St. Francis" peaked at No. 4 on the network's weekly charts in December 2006, and ranked as the No. 34 song on the network's year-end singles chart. Ohbijou was included in the April 5, 2008 broadcast of CBC Radio's The Vinyl Cafe and chosen as Aux.tv's X3 Artist of the month for August 2009, in partnership with CBC Radio 3 and Exclaim!. As well, Casey Mecija was named one of Chatelaine's 80 Women to Watch for 2008.

Ohbijou is nationally distributed through Outside Music. The band released their second album, Beacons in 2009.

Casey Mecija covered The Beatles' "Dear Prudence" for American Laundromat Records charity CD Sing Me To Sleep — Indie Lullabies, which was released worldwide on May 18, 2010. During this year the band also visited China with local promoters Split Works.

The album Metal Meets appeared on the !earshot Campus and Community National Top 50 Albums chart in January 2012.

The band announced, they would go on an indefinite hiatus after their farewell show on September 7, 2013. Casey Mecija has continued to work on music, arts and media projects, including hosting the documentary series The Doc Project on CBC Radio One.

== Members ==
- Casey Mecija – vocals, guitar, ukulele, piano
- Jennifer Mecija – violin, harmochord, Glockenspiel, melodica, vocals
- Heather Kirby – bass, banjo
- James Bunton – drums, trumpet
- Anissa Hart – cello
- Ryan Carley – piano, synth, Glockenspiel, electric piano, harpsichord

== Past members ==
- Andrew Kinoshita – mandolin, guitar

== Discography ==
=== Albums ===
- Swift Feet for Troubling Times (2006)
- Beacons (2009)
- Metal Meets (2011)

=== Splits ===
- The Acorn + Ohbijou - 12" EP (2008)

=== Contributions ===
- Friends in Bellwoods (2007): "The Otherside (Remix)"
- Friends in Bellwoods II (2009): "An Ode to an End"
- Swim Drink Fish Music (2010): "Tour Song"
