= Three Gut Records =

Canadian record label

- Founded: 1999
- Founder: Lisa Moran, Tyler Clarke Burke
- Status: Defunct
- Distributor(s): Outside Music
- Genre: Indie rock
- Country of origin: Canada
- Location: Guelph, Ontario

Three Gut Records was a Guelph, Ontario, Canada based independent record label. It was founded in 1999 by Lisa Moran and Tyler Clark Burke as a vehicle for releasing albums by their friends; it became an influential player in Canadian music with the breakout success of the Constantines' self-titled 2001 release on the label. Three Gut releases were distributed by Outside Music.

Other artists who released music on Three Gut include Royal City, Cuff the Duke, Jim Guthrie, Sea Snakes and Gentleman Reg. The label's name came from their first release, Guthrie's A Thousand Songs, which included a song called "The Fantabulous World of Jimmy 3-Guts", a title derived from reversing the syllables in Guthrie's surname.

Three Gut was also the Canadian label for two albums by the American band Oneida, the only non-Canadian act to have released material on Three Gut.

In 2005, it was announced that Three Gut Records would no longer release new albums.

== Life after Three Gut ==
The closing of Three Gut Records meant all their artists would need to find a new home. Cuff the Duke were the first band to switch to a new label, when they became the first band to sign to Hayden's Hardwood Records. Constantines released a limited-edition vinyl split of Neil Young covers with The Unintended on Toronto's Blue Fog Recordings in early 2006. They signed to Arts & Crafts in 2008 to release Kensington Heights. Another Three Gut alumnus, Gentleman Reg, also signed with Arts & Crafts in July 2008. Jim Guthrie's new band, Human Highway, released their debut album on Montreal's Secret City Records in August 2008, while his follow-up to Now, More Than Ever, called Takes Time, came out in 2013 on Static Clang. Sea Snakes and Royal City have since disbanded, while Oneida continues to work with Jagjaguwar.

== Discography ==
1. Jim Guthrie – A Thousand Songs (2000)
2. Royal City – At Rush Hour the Cars (2000)
3. Gentleman Reg – The Theoretical Girl (2000)
4. Constantines – Constantines (2001)
5. Royal City – Alone at the Microphone (2001)
6. Gentleman Reg – Make Me Pretty (2002)
7. Cuff the Duke – Life Stories for Minimum Wage (2002)
8. Jim Guthrie – Morning Noon Night (2002)
9. Constantines – Shine a Light (2003)
10. Jim Guthrie – Now, More Than Ever (2003)
11. Oneida – Secret Wars (2004)
12. Royal City – Little Heart's Ease (2004)
13. Sea Snakes – Clear as Day, the Darkest Tools (2004)
14. Gentleman Reg – Darby & Joan (2004)
15. Oneida – The Wedding (2005)
16. Constantines – Tournament of Hearts (2005)

== See also ==
- List of record labels
