= Tyler Clark Burke =

Canadian writer and illustrator

Tyler Clark Burke is a Canadian artist, illustrator, designer, and writer based in Toronto, Ontario. She is the co-founder of Canadian independent record label Three Gut Records. She has written and illustrated two children's books.

== Early life and education ==
Tyler Clark Burke grew up in Winnipeg, Manitoba. She attended high school in Kingston, Ontario, where her father was a Queen's University professor. She attended the University of Guelph but returned to Kingston after becoming ill with mononucleosis and chronic fatigue syndrome. She moved to Toronto at the age of 21.

== Career ==
=== Design and visual art ===
In the late 1990s and early 2000s, Burke was also working as a freelance graphic designer and art director, photographing the cover of Peaches' debut album, The Teaches of Peaches, and designing album art for several prominent Canadian musicians, including Jim Guthrie, Royal City, and Feist.

By 1997, Burke was working in Toronto as a graphic designer for Eye Weekly, later becoming the art director and winning two awards for cover design from the Advertising & Design Club of Canada.

Burke has exhibited her artwork with curator Katharine Mulherin.

=== Three Gut Records ===
With Lisa Moran, Burke co-founded Canadian independent record label Three Gut Records in 1999. The label's artists included Royal City and The Constantines. Burke left Three Gut in 2003.

=== Party hosting ===
From 2000 until 2008, Burke hosted various popular art-dance-music parties, including Santa Cruz, which received frequent coverage in local media, including the cover of The Toronto Star. In 2007, Raju Mudhar of the Toronto Star described Burke's Santa Cruz parties as "the brainchild of local artist and provocateur Tyler Clark Burke...One of the neat touches to Santa Cruz was the pick-up party aspect to the throwdowns. Upon arrival, everyone was given a number, along with a corresponding mailbox so admirers could leave messages to objects of their affection."

In 2009, with her husband Jeremy Stewart, she hosted popular miracle fruit tasting parties at events in Toronto under the name of Miracle Fruit Toronto.

=== Registered Psychotherapist (Qualifying) ===
In 2024, Burke qualified for the College of Registered Psychotherapists of Ontario.

=== Children's literature ===
In 2017, Burke wrote and illustrated her debut children's book for Owlkids, Bill Bowerbird and the Unbearable Beak-Ache. A review in Kirkus praised its illustrators as "rich with colors" but criticized the text ("badly forced") and plot ("underdeveloped"). Her second work with Owlkids, Where Are You Now?, is a picture book about death, change, and transformation. It has been reviewed favorably by School Library Journal ("important... for any child experiencing the loss of a loved one…"), Booklist ("insightful and thought-provoking"), and Kirkus Reviews ("With sumptuous illustrations and thought-provoking verses, Burke's meditation can serve as a quiet bedtime story or a deep conversation starter").

Her forthcoming book, The Last Loose Tooth, was picked up by Maria Mondugno (Random House), and will be published in October 2020.

== Publications ==
Books written and illustrated

- Bill Bowerbird and the Unbearable Beak-Ache, by Burke (Owlkids, Mar 2017) ISBN 9781771471541
- Where Are You Now?, by Burke (Owlkids, Oct 2019) ISBN 9781771473675
- The Last Loose Tooth, by Burke (Random House, Oct 2020)
