= Reg Vermue =

Canadian musician

Gentleman Reg
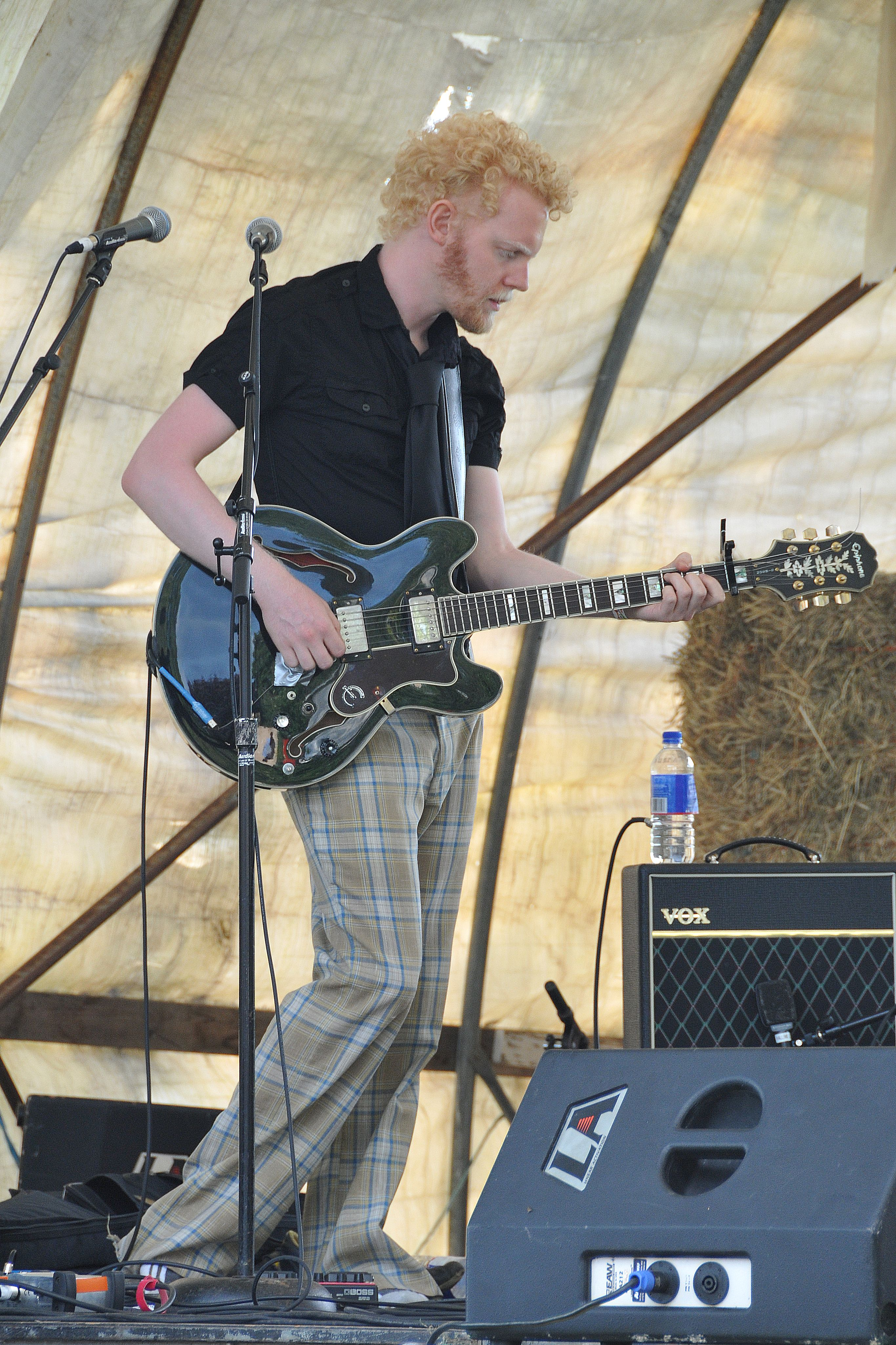
- Gentleman Reg, August 2008

Background information
- Born: Reginald Vermue
- Origin: Trenton, Ontario, Canada
- Genres: Indie rock, folk rock, lo-fi
- Instruments: Guitar vocals piano
- Years active: 2000–present
- Labels: Three Gut; Arts & Crafts
- Formerly of: The Hidden Cameras; Broken Social Scene
- Website: Gentleman Reg

Reginald Vermue is a Canadian indie rock singer from Guelph, Ontario. Born in Trenton, Ontario, he has recorded music under the stage names Gentleman Reg and Regina Gently. His musical style has been compared to Elliott Smith, Aimee Mann, The Smiths and Cat Power. He had a cameo role in the 2006 film Shortbus.

Most recently he began performing with a new band called Light Fires with James Bunton from the band Ohbijou, debuting songs in October 2010 at Pop Montreal. In Light Fires, Vermue performs in drag, adopting the alternate persona Regina Gently.

== Career ==
His debut album, The Theoretical Girl, was released in 2000 on Three Gut Records. He released two more albums, Make Me Pretty in 2002 and Darby & Joan in 2004, on Three Gut before the label dissolved in 2005.

He subsequently signed to Arts & Crafts in 2008. His first release for that label, Little Buildings in 2008, was a compilation of tracks from his Three Gut albums. The album was created for release in the United States, where his earlier albums had never secured wide distribution. At the same time, he also released "You Can't Get it Back", an advance single from his first album of new material for Arts & Crafts, Jet Black, which was released in full on 24 February 2009. Jet Black was the first proper studio album that he released in the United States.

Members of Royal City and The Constantines have regularly appeared as Vermue's band, live and on recordings, as well as long-time drummer Greg Millson, who now performs with Great Lake Swimmers. Vermue was also a member of The Hidden Cameras for several years and has performed with Broken Social Scene, sung backup for Sufjan Stevens, and often guests with Owen Pallett. He also appeared on a tribute CD for The Breeders, Hellbound, performing the song "Doe".

Songs by Gentleman Reg have appeared in such films as Shortbus, Wilby Wonderful, Twist, The End of Silence, Late Fragment, and on the television show Queer as Folk.

Vermue, who is openly gay, appears in a cameo role in the 2006 John Cameron Mitchell film Shortbus. In it, his character claims to be an albino — although Vermue is fair-skinned and has very light blond hair, he is not in fact an albino. Songs by Gentleman Reg are featured on the soundtrack of the film.

In 2019 Vermue released "Good People", the first single to be credited to Regina Gently as a solo act. The following year he released Don't Wait to Love Me, the first full-length Regina Gently album.

== Discography ==
=== Albums ===
- The Theoretical Girl (2000)
- Make Me Pretty (2002)
- Darby & Joan (2004)
- Little Buildings (2008) (U.S. only release)
- Jet Black (2009)
- Heavy Head (2009) (Digital only release)
- Leisure Life (2012)
- Light Fires (2013)
- Don't Wait to Love Me (2020)
- Songs I Already Sang (2024)

=== Compilations ===
- "Doe" on Hellbound: A Tribute to The Breeders (2001)
- "05.07.02" on Recordings From CKLN's Wired for Sound: 2001–2002 – a live recording of "Give Me a Chance"
- "Over My Head (4 track)" on Friends in Bellwoods (2007)
- "For Trust" on Friends in Bellwoods II (2009)
- "Happens All the Time" (Eric's Trip cover) on Have Not Been the Same, Vol. 1: Too Cool to Live, Too Smart to Die (2011, as Light Fires)

=== Soundtracks ===
- Wilby Wonderful by Daniel MacIvor, 2004
- Shortbus by John Cameron Mitchell, 2006

=== Guest vocal appearances ===
- "Communication" from Morning Noon Night by Jim Guthrie (2002)
- "Library" from Has a Good Home by Final Fantasy (2004)
- "Bring My Father a Gift" and "Take Me Down to Yonder River" from Little Heart's Ease by Royal City (2004)
- "Reward and Respite" from Attic Salt by Kepler (2004)
- "Hotline Operator" from Tournament of Hearts by Constantines (2005)
- "Blizzards" from Swift Feet for Troubling Times by Ohbijou (2007)
- "In the Beginning" b/w "Stars" from Unreleased by Isis Salam (2010)
- "Smalltown Boy" from Cenotaph by Buck 65 (2010)
- "Wait & See" from Special Affections by Diamond Rings (2010)
- "Flare Gun" from Heartland by Owen Pallett (2010)

=== As a member of The Hidden Cameras ===
Reg appeared on several of their albums and singles in different capacities.

- The Smell of Our Own (2003)
- The Hidden Cameras Play the CBC Sessions (2003)
- Mississauga Goddam (2004)
- I Believe in the Good of Life CD single (2004)
- Awoo (2006)
