= Aaron Riches =

21st-century Canadian theologian and musician

- Born: 1974 (age 51–52); Guelph, Ontario, Canada

Academic background
- Education: York University; University of Virginia; University of Nottingham
- Thesis: Sequela Christi (2010)
- Doctoral advisor: John Milbank
- Influences: Karen Kilby

Academic work
- Discipline: Theology
- Sub-discipline: Christology; systematic theology
- Musical career
- Genre: Rock
- Occupation: Singer-songwriter

D. Aaron Riches (born 1974) is a Canadian theologian at Benedictine College in Atchison, Kansas. He was previously a theologian for the Seminario Mayor San Cecilio in Granada, Spain, and joint faculty member of the International Academy of Philosophy-Instituto de Filosofía "Edith Stein" and the Instituto de Teología "Lumen Gentium". He is widely published in the fields of systematic theology and Christology. His recent book, Ecce Homo: On the Divine Unity of Christ, questions the tendency to distinguish between the human and divine natures of Christ to such a degree as to oppose them.

Prior to his academic career, Riches was a Canadian singer-songwriter. He was in the bands Left Hand Red, Curtsy, Fiddle Footed, Burn 51 and Minnow. Afterwards, he released two solo albums and toured with the Royal City All-Stars, which eventually became the band Royal City, which has also since disbanded.

Riches is originally from Guelph, Ontario, and is the subject of the Robert Munsch children's book Aaron's Hair.

Riches has five children with wife Melissa. Melissa was the daughter of a Protestant minister working for an NGO in New York City.

== Works ==
- Riches, Aaron (2009). Ecce Homo: On the Divine Unity of Christ. Grand Rapids, Michigan: William B. Eerdmans. ISBN 9780802872319.

== Discography ==
- Over the Light Post (1995)
- Rain (1997)

=== In Royal City ===
- At Rush Hour the Cars (2001)
- Alone at the Microphone (2002)
- Little Heart's Ease (2004)
- Royal City (2009)
