= Nighttime Anytime =

EP by Constantines
- Released: July 8, 2003
- Genre: Indie rock
- Length: 17:07
- Label: Sub Pop

Constantines EP chronology
The Modern Sinner Nervous Man (2002)	Nighttime Anytime (2003)	Young Lions (2004)

Professional ratings
Review scores
Source	Rating
AllMusic	2.5/5 stars
Drowned in Sound	8/10

Nighttime Anytime is an EP by the Constantines released on July 8, 2003, on Sub Pop. The first two tracks are songs that were later released on the album Shine a Light. The third track is a Talking Heads cover, and the final track is an alternate instrumental version of "Hotline Operator" that differs from the track of the same name found on Tournament of Hearts.

== Track listing ==
1. "Nighttime/Anytime (It's Alright)" – 4:13
2. "Tank Commander" – 4:02
3. "Thank You for Sending Me an Angel" – 1:57
4. "Hotline Operator" – 6:55
