= I Am Robot and Proud =

Canadian indie electronic musician

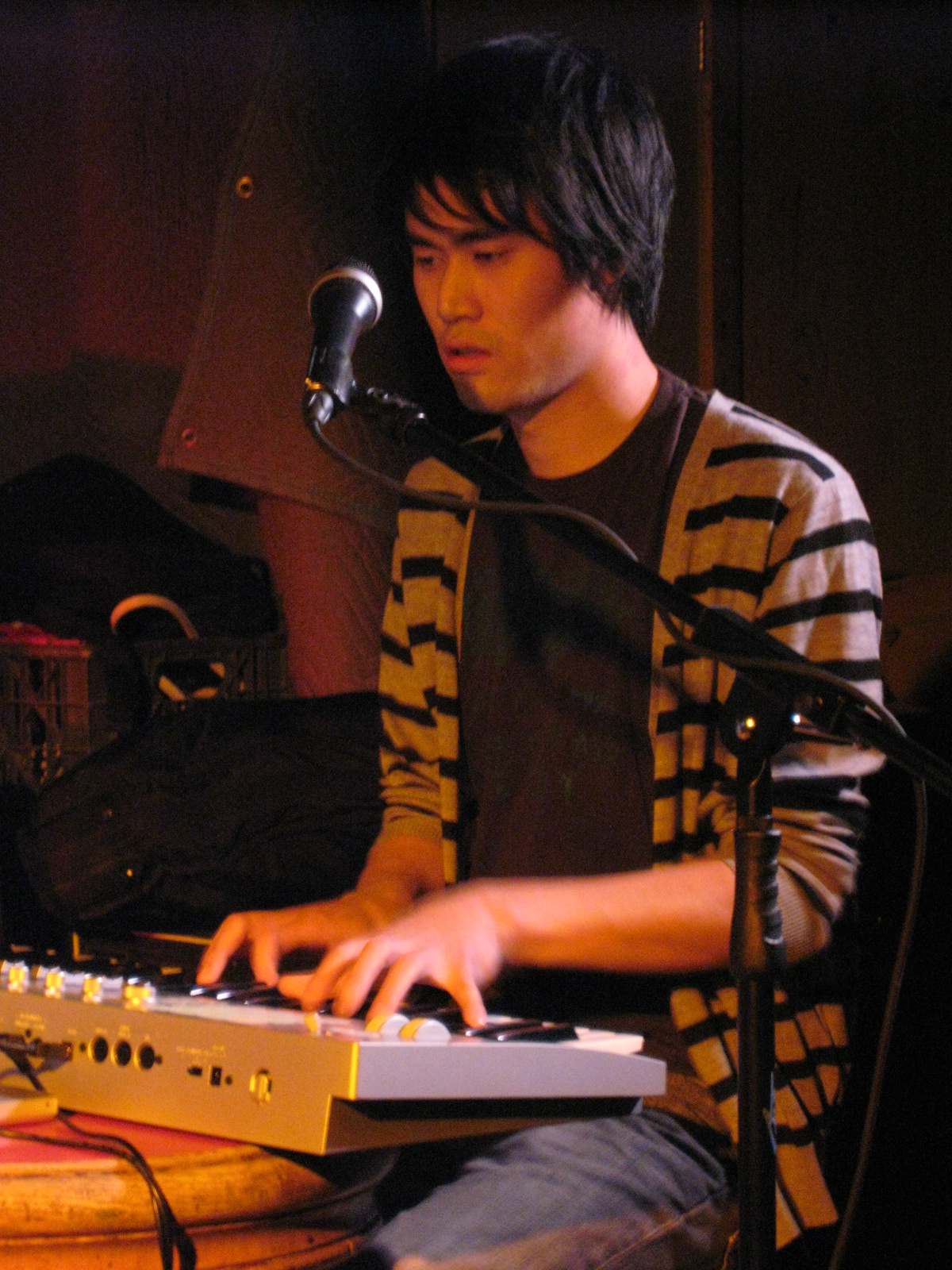
- I Am Robot and Proud performing in February 2009.

Background information
- Born: Shaw-Han Liem; Toronto, Ontario, Canada
- Origin: Toronto, Ontario, Canada
- Genres: Indietronica
- Years active: 2001–present
- Labels: Catmobile, Darla, &
- Website: www.robotandproud.com

Shaw-Han Liem, better known by alias I Am Robot and Proud, is a Canadian IDM/indie electronic musician and video game designer from Toronto, Ontario. He has released albums under the labels Catmobile, Darla and & Records. He co-created the PlayStation 3 and PlayStation Vita game Sound Shapes.

== History ==
Liem was born and raised in Toronto, Ontario. Classically trained as a pianist, Liem taught himself how to play guitar and began creating electronic music under the name I Am Robot and Proud in 2000 while completing a degree in computer science. He has also been a member of Sea Snakes and Tusks, and has worked with Jim Guthrie and Nathan Lawr.

While Liem generally writes and records on his own, 2015's Lights and Waves is the first album conceived and recorded with Liem's live band. The recording was prompted by the composing of band-focused arrangements of his previous work. The I am Robot and Proud live band consists of Toronto musicians Robin Buckley, Mike Smith and Jordan Howard. Previous members have included Jim Guthrie, Samir Khan, Gus Weinkauf, Simon Osbourne, and Jeremy Strachan.

In 2007, he participated in the global launch events for Tenori-On, an instrument designed by Toshio Iwai. In 2009, Liem collaborated on a performance with media artist Daito Manabe, combining Manabe's physical music visualizations with improvised composition. In 2010, he also performed a live collaboration set with Boredoms drummer Senju Muneomi and Tokyo computer-composer Yuri Miyauchi.

Liem collaborated with game designer Jessica Mak on the PlayStation 3 and PlayStation Vita game Sound Shapes, serving as a co-designer and composer. He participated in a roundtable discussion on the topic of independent video game music at the 2009 Game Developers Conference together with the composers of independent game titles PixelJunk Eden, Flower, and Night Game. Sound Shapes won the 2012 Game Critics Awards for best mobile/handheld game, and was declared E3 Game of Show by 1UP.com. It also won Best Song and Best Mobile game at the Spike Video Game Awards.

== Discography ==
=== Albums ===
- The Catch (Catmobile Records, 2001)
- You Make Me This Happy (Piehead Monthly Series Contribution, 2002)
- Grace Days (Catmobile Records, 2003)
- The Electricity in Your House Wants to Sing (Darla Records, 2006)
- Catch/Spring Summer Autumn Winter (Darla Records, 2007)
- Uphill City (Darla Records (US) / & Records (JP), 2008)
- Uphill City Remixes & Collaborations (Darla Records (US) / & Records (JP), 2010)
- Touch/Tone (Darla (US) / 7e.p. (JP), 2013)
- People Music (7e.p. Japan, 2015)
- Light and Waves (Darla Records, 2015)
- Lucky Static (Darla Records, 2018)
- Bird at Sunrise (self-released, 2025)

=== Singles & EPs ===
- Spring Summer Autumn Winter (Mira, 2002)
- Electric Avenue 6 (Duotone, 2003)
- My Sky Your Sky (Duotone, 2005)
- Logika / Paññā (7e.p., 2018)

=== Compilation appearances ===
- One, Two, Three, Four, Five, Six, Seven on Songs of Seven Colors (p*dis/inpartmaint, 2008)
- Jean Meance on Habitat (Asthmatic Kitty, 2008)
- Little Keys on Anything For Progress (& Records, 2011)

=== Remixes and collaborations ===
- De De Mouse Sundown River on Sunset Girls (Avex Trax, 2008)
- Gentleman Reg We're in a Thunderstorm on Jet Black (Arts & Crafts, 2009)
- Mitsuki Aira Happiness Land on Barbie Barbie (D-topia, 2009)
- no.9 Princess on Usual Revolution & Nine (Liquid Note, 2009)
- Deastro Green, Grays and Nordics on Tone Adventure #3 (Ghostly International, 2009)
- Brian Alfred It's Already The End of The World Installation/DVD Soundtrack (Haunch of Venison, 2010)
- Yuri Miyauchi _ael remix on Toparch (Rallye Japan, 2010)
- Jim Guthrie All Gone alternate mix on Now More Than Ever LP (3 Syllables, 2010)
- Pupa Dreaming Pupa remix on Remix EP (EMI Japan, 2010)
- Autumnleaf One Day remix on The Foot Remix EP (wood/water Japan, 2011)
- Yomoya Kitaineiro remix on Yawn (& Records, 2011)
- Minotaurs Pink Floyd remix on The Thing Remixed (Static Clang, 2011)
- Baiyon collaboration track "Madder Red" on Vibes Against Vibes (Descanso, 2011)
- Shintaro Aoki collaboration track "Two Pianos" on Mizukage Compilation 16 (Mizukage, 2011)
- The Girl and The Robots remix track "單人探戈" on 平行宇宙 (Asia Muse / R2G Music, 2012)
- Akira Kosemura remix track "虹の彼方" on 虹の彼方 single (Schole Records, 2013)
- Lasah collaboration track "Give Up" on the album I Love You (2014)
- Qrion remix track "Mizu" on the album Sink (Sense Label, 2014)
- Lasah collaboration track "WELCOME TO THE MABOROSHI CLUB" on the album Mother (2018)
