= Little Buildings =

Compilation album by Gentleman Reg
- Released: November 11, 2008
- Genre: Indie pop
- Label: Arts & Crafts

Gentleman Reg chronology
Darby & Joan (2004)	Little Buildings (2008)	Jet Black (2009)

Little Buildings is a compilation album by Gentleman Reg, released on November 11, 2008. It is his first release for the Arts & Crafts record label, and compiles several tracks from his earlier albums on Three Gut Records, as well as one unreleased new song, "Something to Live For". The album is intended principally for the American market, where his earlier albums were not widely distributed.

His fourth studio album, Jet Black, followed in February 2009 on Arts & Crafts.

== Track listing ==
1. "Bundle"
2. "It's Not Safe"
3. "Untouchable"
4. "Don't Bring Me Down"
5. "The Boyfriend Song"
6. "Give Me the Chance to Fall"
7. "The Three Most Important Girls"
8. "You're So Alone"
9. "Something to Live For"
