= Up with People (disambiguation) =

Up with People may refer to:

- Up with People, a U.S.-based educational, cultural, civic and performing arts organization and a musical performance
- "Up with People", a song by Lambchop from the 2000 album Nixon
- "Up with People", a song by Oneida from the 2006 album Happy New Year
