= Little Heart's Ease =

Little Heart's Ease may refer to:

- Little Heart's Ease, Newfoundland and Labrador
- Little Heart's Ease (album), by Royal City
