= Sea Snakes =

Musical group

- Origin: Toronto, Ontario, Canada
- Genres: Indie rock
- Years active: 2002–2005
- Past members: Jimmy McIntyre; Kristian Galberg; Jeremy Strachan; Shaw-Han Liem; Nathan Lawr
- Website: www.seasnakes.net

Sea Snakes were a Canadian indie rock band, based in Toronto, Ontario. Band members are vocalist and guitarist Jimmy McIntyre, guitarist Kristian Galberg, bassist and saxophonist Jeremy Strachan, keyboardist Shaw-Han Liem, and drummer Nathan Lawr.

== History ==
The Sea Snakes formed in 2002; in 2004 the band released an album, Clear as Day, the Darkest Tools on the Three Gut Records label. That year they performed around Toronto, sharing engagements with the Singing Saws and The Microphones. They also played in New York that year with Jim Guthrie.

The Sea Snakes disbanded in 2005.

McIntyre and Galberg later played together in the band Miserere. Strachan played in the defunct band Rockets Red Glare and in Feuermusik, and Galberg plays in Burn Rome in a Dream along with former Rockets Red Glare member Evan Clarke.

== Discography ==
Clear as Day, the Darkest Tools is the only album recorded by Sea Snakes. It was released in 2004 on the Three Gut Records label. Total length is 41:48.

=== Track listing ===
1. "Conception Bay, South" – 4:04
2. "Forget-Me-Not Night" – 4:45
3. "A Pallbearer's Calendar" – 4:42
4. "It's Good" – 3:11
5. "Firebugs at Cafe Eitelkeit" – 7:16
6. "Black Phones" – 4:45
7. "Mafia Car" – 3:56
8. "Kid Don't Go Big Song" – 5:46
9. "Tie Me Up God" – 3:23
