= Company (band) =

American band

Company is an American band formed in Brooklyn, New York in 2001. The band performs folk- and country-based songs with punk and psychedelic rock energy.

== Founding and early period ==
Company’s members met at Bard College, where they collaborated in a variety of punk groups and folk ensembles. After moving to Brooklyn, they formed the band in 2001.

In their early period, the band recorded two studio albums, which remain unreleased, as well as a live album. In 2004, they self-released their third record, Hills (recorded by former Oakley Hall drummer Will Dyar). Next, they recorded their fourth, Parallel Time and Oneida's Brah Records picked it up for release in October 2005. Their second CD on Brah, Old Baby, released in February 2008, was produced by Kid Millions of Oneida. In the 2000s, Company could often be found sharing a billing with their label-mates Oakley Hall, Oneida, Home, and Dirty Faces.

In 2014, a single from their self-released album Over the Mountain entitled "Poisonous Spider" was used in TV show The Vampire Diaries in the episode "No Exit," which aired on February 27, 2014. Company went on to release its first LP on its own Papasan Recordings in August 2014.

== Members ==
The band consists of three songwriters and a drummer.

- Adam Davison- guitar, bass, vocals, keyboards
- David Janik- drums, percussion, vocals
- Stephanie Rabins- bass, guitar, vocals, violin
- Christopher Teret- guitar, bass, vocals, harmonica, keyboards

== Discography ==
The band has released several albums and singles.

=== Studio albums ===
- Company a.k.a. Jingle Jangle in the Jukebox (recorded in 2002 - unreleased)
- Hills (recorded in 2002 - self-released in 2004)
- Hadley (recorded in 2003 - unreleased)
- Parallel Time (recorded in 2004 - released in 2005 on Brah Records)
- Old Baby (recorded in 2006 - released in 2008 on Brah Records)
- Ice Age: Outtakes and Demos (recorded 2004–2007 – released as promo download with Old Baby in 2008)
- Night Ground (recorded in 2008 - released in 2010 on Peapod Recordings)
- Jazz Hall of Fame (recorded in 2009 - unreleased)
- Over the Mountain (recorded in 2010 - released in 2014 on Papasan Recordings)

=== Live albums ===
- Live at Nine-C (Self-released - 2001)

=== Singles ===
- Rude / Angelina (recorded in 2002 - unreleased)
- Poisonous Spider (recorded in 2010 - released in 2014 on Papasan Recordings)
