= Unintended =

Unintended may refer to:

- "Unintended" (song), a 1999 single by Muse
- Unintended, a 2018 drama film directed by Anja Murmann
- The Unintended, a Canadian indie supergroup

== See also ==
- Unintended pregnancy
- Unintended consequences
