= Sound Shapes =

2012 video game

- Developer: Queasy Games (Note: Santa Monica Studio assisted on development. Wholesale Algorithms developed the PlayStation 4 version.)
- Publisher: Sony Computer Entertainment
- Designers: Jessica Mak (Note: Credited under her birth name Jonathan Mak.); Shaw-Han Liem
- Composers: Shaw-Han Liem; Jessica Mak; Jim Guthrie; Deadmau5; Beck
- Platforms: PlayStation 3 PlayStation Vita; PlayStation 4
- Release: PS3, Vita: NA: 7 August 2012; EU: 15 August 2012; JP: 27 September 2012; PS4: NA: 15 November 2013; EU: 29 November 2013
- Genres: Music, platform
- Mode: Single-player

Sound Shapes is a music and platform video game developed by Queasy Games and published by Sony Computer Entertainment for the PlayStation 3 and PlayStation Vita. It was originally released in 2012 and a port for the PlayStation 4 was released in 2013. The game, designed by Jessica Mak and Shaw-Han Liem, is a side-scrolling platform game with a musical focus. The game also features the ability to create and share levels with other users. The Vita version of the game features use of the touch screen and back touch pad to place sounds of different musical instruments during creation of levels. Sound Shapes was shown at industry conference E3 in 2011 and picked up nominations for best of show award from media sites including IGN, 1UP, and Electric Playground. It also received 2 Game Critics Awards (Best Mobile and Best Casual), and received three nominations at the 16th Annual D.I.C.E. Awards.

At the Spike Video Game Awards 2011, it was announced that Deadmau5 would be contributing songs and sound material to the project.

Beck has contributed 3 new songs to the game: "Cities", "Touch the People", and "Spiral Staircase". These are still exclusive to the game as of 2026, despite fan desire to see them released digitally.

It was included on the "Best of PlayStation Network Vol. 1" compilation disc, released 18 June 2013.

== Development ==
Mak and Liem wanted to develop a game that could give beginners a sense of joyful creation, without the need for harmonic training or complicated music theory. They prototyped their idea for about a year before settling on the coin-collecting musical mechanics that the final game has. To cater to the 'hardcore platformer' player base, Death Mode was introduced. It was important to marry the sound with the style, so each album was a close collaboration between a musician and a visual artist. In some cases levels began with a song, in other cases a style, and evolved naturally from there.

== Downloadable content ==
At launch Sound Shapes had various downloadable content (DLC) available.

The first round of DLC was released on 4 December 2012, having three sound packs and a curved terrain pack. It introduces five new instruments and Beat School levels.

The second round of DLC was released on 12 March 2013, having more milkcrate free updates and a Car Mini-Album Creator pack. It also introduced offline play, a much-requested feature.

On 14 May 2013, two new sound packs were released. One being an 80s sound pack, adding synth features, and the other DLC being a dubstep sound pack featuring new Beat School features.

On 28 May 2013, five new Milkcrate albums were released as a free update.

== Online server shutdown ==
On 15 October 2018, the server for Sound Shapes was shut down, meaning that players were no longer able to access any online-related information. This included Community-made levels and uploading levels to the Community. This accounted for every console the game was released on.

== Reception ==
Reception

Aggregate scores
Aggregator	Score
GameRankings	86.60%
Metacritic	84/100

Review scores
Publication	Score
Edge	8/10
Eurogamer	7/10
Game Informer	9/10
GameSpot	9/10
IGN	9.0/10

Sound Shapes was selected for Best Handheld Game in the 2012 Spike Video Game Awards. Sound Shapes also won for Best Song in a Game for "Cities" by Beck. During the 16th Annual D.I.C.E. Awards, the Academy of Interactive Arts & Sciences nominated Sound Shapes for "Handheld Game of the Year", "Outstanding Innovation in Gaming", and "Casual Game of the Year".
