= Each One Teach One (disambiguation) =

Each one teach one is an African-American proverb.

Each One Teach One may also refer to:

- Each One Teach One (Oneida album), a 2002 double album by Oneida
- Each One Teach One (Groundation album), the second album by American reggae band Groundation
