= Jessica Mak =

Canadian video game developer (b. 1981/1982)

Jessica Mak (formerly Jonathan Mak; born 1981/1982) is a Canadian video game developer known for designing the music-themed games Everyday Shooter (2006) and Sound Shapes (2012). In 2021, it was announced that Mak was developing a game with Annapurna Interactive.

== Early life ==
Mak was born in Toronto, Canada in 1981 or 1982. She developed an interest in games by watching her two older brothers play video games when she was young. She also worked in her father's computer store, and started programming games in 1997 or 1998. According to Polygon, Mak and Dyad developer Shawn McGrath became "minor rivals" while schoolmates, being the only ones at their school who created games. Also interested in writing music and playing the guitar from a young age, Mak later told Gamasutra: "When I was a kid and I wrote my first song, it was super empowering."

== Career ==
=== Early work and Everyday Shooter ===
Before she developed her 2007 shooter game Everyday Shooter, Mak independently developed around ten games under her studio Queasy Games. These games included Gate 88, a real-time strategy game, and Bubble Thing, a game she created during the Toronto Game Jam, a game development event; Mak later called her early work "stinky."

Mak developed Everyday Shooter in the span of two years while working a job that would allow her to pay rent. First developed as a puzzle game inspired by Lumines and Every Extend Extra, Mak chose to create a shooter game after experiencing development difficulties. Mak also chose to develop a game that was simpler than her last project, Gate 88, which she felt was a "complicated mess of rules and controls", a decision which ultimately resulted in a game which she described as a music album containing shoot 'em up games rather than songs, with levels which greatly differ "visually, musically, and in terms of gameplay." After Sony Computer Entertainment noticed the game at the Independent Games Festival in 2007, where the game won three awards, Everyday Shooter was made available on the PlayStation 3, distributed through Sony's PlayStation Network games download service.

Wired reported that, for her presentation at the 2008 Game Developers Conference, Mak solely played "catchy music" and dispersed balloons into the audience, rather than speak about game design.

=== Sound Shapes and future work ===
Mak was a designer of the 2012 musical platformer game Sound Shapes, published by Sony Computer Entertainment for the PlayStation Vita. Engadget said that the game stood out because of an "unforgettable soundtrack" with contributions from musicians Shaw-Han Liem (also known as I Am Robot and Proud), Jim Guthrie, and Beck. Liem and Mak decided to work on a project together after meeting at one of Liem's shows and found that they enjoyed each other's work. Sound Shapes was the "ninth or tenth" of video game prototypes that the two worked on.

An untitled project being developed by Mak was revealed by video game publisher Annapurna Interactive during its online showcase of projects in 2021. Polygon said the project, like Mak's previous games, drew inspiration from music games including Rez.
