= Jet black =

Jet Black or jet black may refer to:

- jet (lignite), an organic mineral black in colour
- Shades of black § Jet
- Jet black, the darkest shade of black hair color
- Jet Black, drummer for The Stranglers
- Jettblack, an English rock band
- "Jet Black", 1959 song by The Shadows (known then as The Drifters)
- "Jet Black", a 1995 song by Jawbreaker from Dear You
- Jet Black, an album by Gentleman Reg
- Jet Black (Cowboy Bebop), a character from the anime Cowboy Bebop
- Jet Black (Viewtiful Joe), a character from the video game series Viewtiful Joe
