= Below (video game) =

2018 video game

- Developer: Capybara Games
- Publisher: Capybara Games
- Director: Kris Piotrowski
- Producer: Nathan Vella
- Designers: Kris Piotrowski; Anthony Chan
- Programmer: Bryan McConkey
- Artists: Anthony Chan; Sylvain Coutouly
- Composer: Jim Guthrie
- Engine: PhyreEngine
- Platforms: Windows, Xbox One, PlayStation 4
- Release: Windows, Xbox One; December 14, 2018; PS4; April 7, 2020
- Genre: Action-adventure
- Mode: Single-player

Below is an action-adventure game developed by Capybara Games. The game was announced during Microsoft's E3 2013 press event, and was indefinitely delayed in 2016. It initially released on Microsoft Windows and Xbox One on December 14, 2018, with a PS4 port released in 2020. The game received mixed reviews upon release.

== Gameplay ==
The player can sleep, cook food, or create a fast travel point at bonfires.

Below is an action-adventure game viewed from a top-down perspective with roguelike elements. The player-character is a "tiny warrior exploring the depths of a remote island". The game is about exploration, though that goal is contingent upon the character's survival. Microsoft's Phil Spencer described the game at E3 2013 as a "creative take on roguelike gameplay" in a "mysterious world". The environments are randomly generated. The game is designed to be difficult, with "brutal but fair combat" and permanent death.

== Development ==
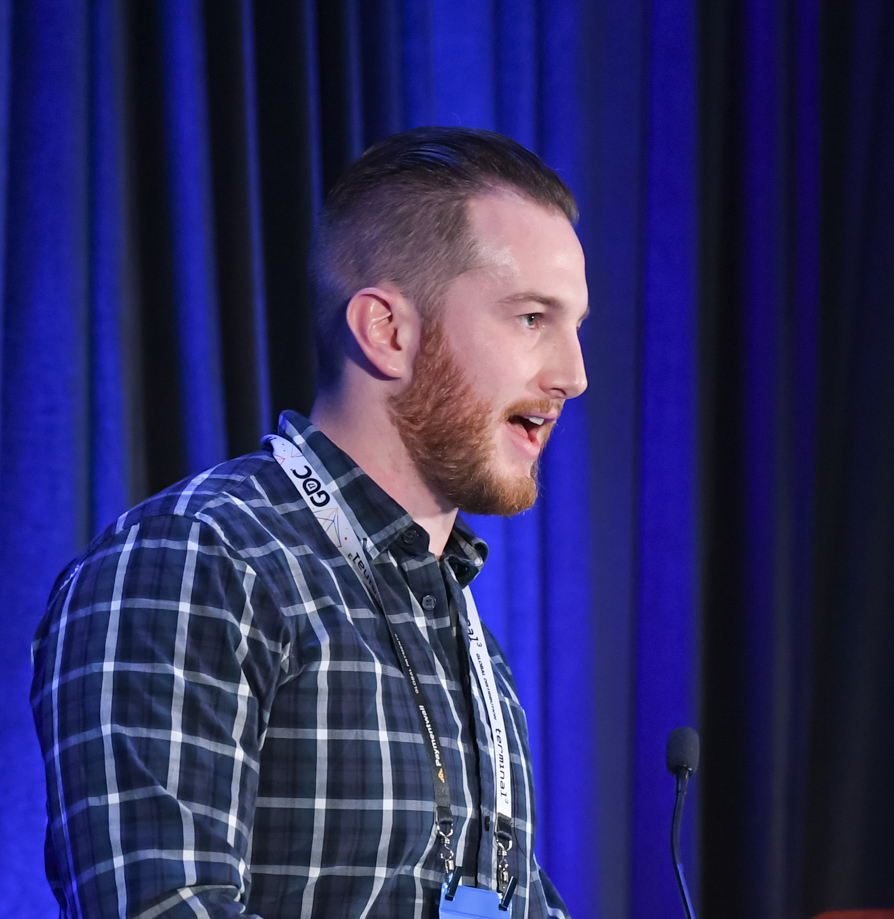
Colin Weick of Capybara presents on the game's development at the 2017 Game Developers Conference

Below was announced at Microsoft's E3 2013 event. The project had been in development for years. The company had discussed ideas for the game, particularly the difficulty element with Capybara's Kris Piotrowski.

Capybara compared the game to "roguelikes of yore", as a "roguelike-like" with design choices like permanent death and high difficulty. The game punishes recklessness and is designed for fair, but rigorous combat. Capybara president and co-founder Nathan Vella called the game the company's largest by number of features, artwork, and development time and difficulty. He described the game as a "super video game-y video game" for its aesthetics, soundtrack, and game mechanics. While the game is mostly single-player, the multiplayer aspects are important in some of the world's areas. In March 2014, Vella said that the game's development progress was hard to gauge, but its foundation was laid. Its first playable demo was scheduled for the April PAX East 2014.

To create and emphasize scale, Capybara chose to make the player-character small and use a dramatic tilt-shift photography effect.

Below was expected to release simultaneously on Microsoft Windows and Xbox One, and would be a timed exclusive on Xbox One for a limited time. The project was indefinitely delayed in mid-2016 while Capybara turned to finish OK K.O.! Let's Play Heroes for Cartoon Network. Below was released on Xbox One and Microsoft Windows on December 14, 2018. A PlayStation 4 version and an easier difficulty setting was released on April 7.

== Soundtrack ==
Singer-songwriter Jim Guthrie composed the score. His compositional work on a previous Capybara's release, Superbrothers: Sword & Sworcery EP, led to their Below collaboration. Capybara has described Sword & Sworcery as a game built upon Guthrie's music, and Below as Guthrie's music built upon Capybara's game. The soundtrack for the game was released over three albums: Below (Original Soundtrack), Below OST - Volume II, and Below OST - Volume III.

== Reception ==
Reception

Aggregate score
Aggregator	Score
Metacritic	PC: 67/100; XONE: 70/100; PS4: 75/100

Review scores
Publication	Score
Destructoid	6.5/10
Edge	8/10
Game Informer	7.5/10
GameSpot	6/10
IGN	6.9/10
Official Xbox Magazine (UK)	8/10
PC Gamer (US)	68/100

The game received "mixed or average" reviews, according to review aggregator Metacritic. It was nominated for "Game, Original Action" at the National Academy of Video Game Trade Reviewers Awards, and for "Best Sound Design for an Indie Game" at the 2019 G.A.N.G. Awards.

Rock, Paper, Shotgun's Alice Bell criticized the game's insta-death traps and slow progression, but praised the game's world and atmosphere. Colin Campbell, writing for Polygon praised the mystery and visuals of the game, but disliked the repetition of the levels. Destructoid's Jordan Devore praised the ambience of the game but criticized the pacing, saying "Below puts its best foot forward in its early hours and then never stops losing steam".
