= Royal City (band) =

Rock band from Canada (1999–2004)

- Origin: Guelph, Ontario, Canada
- Genre: Indie rock
- Years active: 1999–2004
- Labels: Three Gut, Asthmatic Kitty, Low Transit Industries
- Past members: Aaron Riches; Jim Guthrie; Lonnie James; Simon Osborne; Nathan Lawr

Royal City was a Canadian indie rock band from Guelph.

== History ==
Royal City were formed in 1999 at Jim Guthrie's house in downtown Guelph, Ontario. The band was fronted by Aaron Riches, known in the local all ages punk scene for having booked and opening up for Fugazi, his releases on DROG Records, and for being the subject of a Robert Munsch book as a child. The band's first album, At Rush Hour the Cars, was released in 2000.

Originally called The Royal City All Stars, the band moved to Toronto after signing with Three Gut Records. At Three Gut, Royal City joined label mates Cuff the Duke and The Constantines in Toronto's early 2000s music scene. While working with many collaborators, the core of Royal City consisted of Aaron Riches, Lonnie James, Simon Osborne, and Jim Guthrie. James replaced original drummer Nathan Lawr in 2002.

During their time as a band, Royal City toured across Canada, playing in Whitehorse, Yukon, and opening for Sarah Harmer. They performed at the 2002 South by South West festival. In 2002, a then-unknown Arcade Fire opened for the band on a series of tour dates, and in 2003 the band played in Sufjan Stevens' living room as their first show in New York City.

The band was also host to a number of notable collaborations, including Leslie Feist, Sufjan Stevens, Final Fantasy, Gentleman Reg, and Bob Wiseman.

After disbanding in 2004, Aaron Riches went on to study radical orthodoxy under John Milbank at the University of Nottingham. Nathan Lawr continues to release music as a solo artist and with his band the Minotaurs. Jim Guthrie has achieved considerable success scoring the video game Superbrothers: Sword & Sworcery EP, and the film Indie Game: The Movie. He's also been a member of Human Highway, and has toured as part of Islands. Lonnie James went on to release two critically acclaimed solo records on Teenage USA records (This Land is Your Land, Dee-o).

In early 2009, Sufjan Stevens' Asthmatic Kitty records released Royal City, a collection of outtakes and b-sides.

== Members ==
- Aaron Riches – guitar, vocals
- Jim Guthrie – guitar, backing vocals
- Simon Osborne – bass guitar
- Nathan Lawr – drums (1999–2002)
- Lonnie James – drums (2002–2004)

== Collaborators ==
- Leslie Feist – Guitar
- Sufjan Stevens – Glockenspiel, Production
- Owen Pallett – Violin
- Gentleman Reg – Guitar
- Bob Wiseman – Keyboards

== Albums ==
- At Rush Hour the Cars (2000)
- Alone at the Microphone (2001)
- Little Heart's Ease (2004)
- Royal City (2009)

== Singles ==
- "Small Singles Club" (EP) (2001)
- "I Called" – City of Music compilation (2002)
- "There's a Hole in My Heart" – Ten; Ten compilation (2002)
- "14.12.01" – Recordings From CKLN’s Wired for Sound: 2001–2002 (2002) – A live recording of the song "Spacy Basement"
- "That My Head were A Spring" – Comes With a Smile issue 13 (2003)
- "Is This It" – Stop Me If you Think you've Heard This One Before – Various Artists Rough Trade (2004)
- "Tarry – "Comes with a smile" issue 16 (2004)

== Covered by ==
- The Constantines – "Raw Youth" – Young Lions EP (2004)
- The Wooden Sky – "I Am A Raw Youth" – Bedrooms + Backstreets EP (2009)
