= Everyday Shooter =

2006 video game

- European PlayStation Store icon
- Developer: Queasy Games (Note: Additional work by Santa Monica Studio on the PlayStation versions.)
- Publishers: Queasy Games; Sony Computer Entertainment (PS3, PSP)
- Designer: Jessica Mak (Note: Credited under her former name Jonathan Mak.)
- Composers: Jessica Mak; Shaw-Han Liem
- Platforms: Windows, PlayStation 3, PlayStation Portable
- Release: Windows; March 29, 2006 (Online); May 8, 2008 (Steam); PlayStation 3: NA: October 11, 2007; PAL: February 14, 2008; JP: May 15, 2008; PlayStation Portable: NA: December 4, 2008; PAL: January 22, 2009; JP: June 11, 2009
- Genres: Multidirectional shooter, music
- Mode: Single-player

Everyday Shooter (also known as Riff: Everyday Shooter) is a multidirectional shooter video game developed and published by Queasy Games for Windows.

== Development ==
Everyday Shooter was developed in the span of a few months by Jessica Mak using Visual C++. After her last project, Gate 88, which Mak called a "complicated mess of rules and controls", Mak desired to make a much simpler game. Initially the game started out as a puzzle game inspired by Mak's interest in Lumines and Every Extend Extra, however Mak had trouble with this route and decided instead to turn the game into a shooter. In addition to programming and graphic design, Mak recorded and implemented an all-guitar soundtrack to the game.

Sony Computer Entertainment took notice of the game at the 2007 Independent Gaming Festival and published it for the PlayStation 3 on October 11 as a downloadable game on the PlayStation Network.

== Gameplay ==
Everyday Shooter is a dual-stick, multidirectional shooter. In the game's "Normal Play" mode, the player maneuvers a small dot through eight different levels. The gameplay dynamics (enemy types, chaining systems, etc.) change with each level, encouraging the player to observe their surroundings closely to best adapt to new rule sets.

Jessica Mak describes the game as "...an album of games exploring the expressive power of abstract shooters. Dissolute sounds of destruction are replaced with guitar riffs harmonizing over an all-guitar soundtrack, while modulating shapes celebrate the flowing beauty of geometry."

In addition to unique background music for every stage, the player creates dynamic music as they interact with the environment. For example, shooting one type of enemy will trigger a guitar note or riff, while destroying another enemy will result in a different guitar sample.

Initially, the only way to play the game is through "Normal Play" which presents the player with all eight stages in order from first to last. However, points scored in the game can be used to unlock several features such as a "Shuffle Mode". Similar to using a shuffle mode on any music player, turning on shuffle mode in the game will reconfigure the order of the stages except the final. Other unlockable features include various graphic filters and the ability to increase the number of lives the player has at the beginning of a game. The player may also unlock the stages to make them available individually in "Single Play". After completing a run through normal mode, a new game mode is unlocked. "Travel Mode" allows the player to play either the main game or individual stages while being invincible, at the cost of the points scored in this mode being unusable to unlock anything.

== Reception ==
Reception

Aggregate score
| Aggregator | Score | | |
| Aggregator | PC | PS3 | PSP |
|---|---|---|---|
| Metacritic | 77/100 | 83/100 | 68/100 |

Review scores
| Publication | Score | | |
| Publication | PC | PS3 | PSP |
|---|---|---|---|
| 1Up.com | N/A | A | N/A |
| Edge | N/A | 8/10 | N/A |
| Eurogamer | N/A | 8/10 | N/A |
| GamePro | N/A | 5/5 | N/A |
| GameRevolution | N/A | N/A | C |
| GameSpot | N/A | 8/10 | N/A |
| GameZone | N/A | N/A | 6.5/10 |
| IGN | 8/10 | 7.9/10 | 7/10 |
| PlayStation Official Magazine – UK | N/A | 7/10 | N/A |
| PC Gamer (US) | 84% | N/A | N/A |
| The A.V. Club | N/A | A− | N/A |

Awards
| Publication | Award |
|---|---|
| Independent Games Festival | Design Innovation, Excellence in Audio, GameTap Indie Awards |
| Kotaku | 2007 Game of the Year for PSN |

The PlayStation 3 and Windows versions received "favorable" reviews, while the PSP version received "average" reviews, according to the review aggregation website Metacritic.

A review from 1UP.com said that the PS3 version "succeeds wildly as an engaging shooter for the art-house crowd, and a creative change of pace for the hardcore-shooter crowd." Some critics pointed out similarities to the game Rez, while The A.V. Club pointed out homages to classic arcade games such as Centipede, Robotron 2084, and Time Pilot.

Many publications cited the PS3 version's difficulty as a source of frustration, though some pointed out that its unlocking system can ease the process of getting through "Normal Play" (or, that it can be bypassed altogether by unlocking songs in "Single Play"). IGN also criticized the method of point-collecting: Points in Everyday Shooter must be physically collected by the player in the brief amount of time after they appear or else they'll quickly fade away. In IGN's PS3 version review, it was noted that "flying over all the points is far less effective than it should be, since zipping through a huge clump of them will often yield only a few actual pick-ups."
