= Rockets Red Glare =

Canadian alternative rock band

- Origin: Toronto, Ontario, Canada
- Genres: Alternative rock
- Years active: 1999–2003
- Labels: Die Venom Records, Sickroom, Blue Skies Turn Black Records
- Past members: Jeremy Strachan; Evan Clarke; David Weinkauf

Rockets Red Glare was a Canadian alternative rock band from Toronto, active in the early 2000s.

Rockets Red Glare formed in the winter of 1999 following the demise of hardcore band Blake and instrumental trio Blue Light Blockade. They released their self-titled debut album in 2002.

The band's second album, Moonlight Desires, was released in 2003. The album appeared on the !earshot National Top 50 chart in August 2003. That year Rockets Red Glare disbanded; members went on to join Sea Snakes (Strachan), Burn Rome in a Dream (Clarke), Jim Guthrie (Clarke), and Picastro (Clarke). In late 2004, Strachan and drummer David "Gus" Weinkauf formed Feuermusik, a free jazz duo with Strachan on saxophone and Weinkauf playing percussion on buckets.

In 2006, the band reunited to play a series of shows.

== Discography ==
- "Redshift" / "Halifax" (2001, single) on Die Venom Records
- Rockets Red Glare (2002) on Sickroom Records
- Moonlight Desires (2003) on Blue Skies Turn Black Records
