= Jonas Berkeley =

- Born: Ontario, Canada
- Occupation: Saxophonist
- Instrument: Saxophone
- Years active: 1994–present

Jonas Berkeley is a saxophonist from the Southern Ontario region of Canada. In 2003 the Constantines received a Juno Award (Best Alternative Album) nomination for their Shine A Light (see nomination listing for the following year) LP release that Berkeley had provided saxophone assistance on. He is conversant on tenor and baritone sax, flute, clarinet and bass clarinet. He has worked on cruise ships, and in a variety of musical theatre productions, such as Grease! and Jesus Christ Superstar (see Hamilton Spectator reviews, 1997–2000). His West-coast funk band, Foundation, was named The Nerve Magazine Best Local Band of the Year by their in-house critic, Filmore Mescalito Holmes (see Best of the Year, 2006). He is also a background performer/extra, having appeared in X-Men: The Last Stand, RV, Wildfires, the 4400, Eureka, Kyle XY, The Evidence, Stargate: Atlantis, Dungeon Siege and more. He is a traveller, having visited most of the Western Hemisphere in a plane, van or ship. He is an accomplished sailor, having done some racing on the Eerie Witch out of Port Dover. He has lived in the Caribbean for the last 3 winters and does not plan on remaining in Canada for another.
