= Atheists, Reconsider =

EP by Oneida / Liars
- Released: December 10, 2002
- Genre: Alternative rock/Indie rock/dance-punk
- Label: Arena Rock

Professional ratings
Review scores
Source	Rating
AllMusic	4/5 stars
Pitchfork	7.4/10.0

Atheists, Reconsider is a split EP between two Brooklyn groups: Oneida and Liars. Each band contributes two original songs, plus one cover of a composition by the other band. The album art was designed by Karl LaRocca/Kayrock Screenprinting.

== Track listing ==
1. "Rose and Licorice" - Liars
2. "Privilege" - Oneida
3. "All in All a Careful Party" - Liars
4. "Fantastic Morgue" - Oneida
5. "Every Day Is a Child with Teeth" - Oneida
6. "Dorothy Taps the Toe of the Tinman" - Liars
