= Bleak Sword =

2019 video game

- Developer: more8bit
- Publisher: Devolver Digital
- Designer: Luis Moreno
- Composer: Jim Guthrie
- Platforms: iOS, macOS, tvOS, Nintendo Switch, Windows
- Release: September 19, 2019; Nintendo Switch, Windows; June 8, 2023
- Genre: Action role-playing
- Mode: Single-player

Bleak Sword is a 2019 action role-playing video game developed by Spanish studio more8bit and published by Devolver Digital. The game was originally released on September 19, 2019 for iOS, macOS and tvOS through Apple Arcade, with an updated version, Bleak Sword DX, releasing on June 8, 2023 for Nintendo Switch and Windows. The game continues to build on the core elements of the original game, offering expanded gameplay mechanics, narrative techniques, and atmospheric world-building. The game is centered around nine chapters of cursed diorama battlefields, where the hero must lift the curse of the legendary Bleak Sword by eliminating the hostile creatures in each environment.

== Gameplay ==
Gameplay screenshot.

Bleak Sword is a top-down, isometric action role-playing game set in a dark fantasy world and uses a unique, condensed art style reminiscent of 8-bit classics, but with a modern twist. The game is designed around touch controls, with gameplay involving dodging, counterattacking, and striking foes in real time combat. As players progress through the game they can unlock and upgrade abilities to improve their performance, increasing their chances of defeating challenging boss encounters. The game resembles soulslikes in its experience system, in which players gain experience points by clearing stages but lose those not used for leveling up after dying twice in a stage. Bleak Sword consists of nine chapters, each with several levels. Each level features unique enemy types and environmental hazards. Players are tasked with freeing the cursed land from the dark hostiles that have overrun it.

== Development ==
The development of Bleak Sword began in 2017 under the direction of Luis Moreno Jiménez at more8bit. Jiménez was inspired by the Souls series of games, notably their use of challenging combat and cryptic storytelling. He aimed to deliver a similar experience within a condensed, pixel art aesthetic and touch-based control scheme. Jim Guthrie helped compose the game's soundtrack.

The minimalist visual style was adopted out of Jiménez's love for mixing 2D sprites and 3D environments, which became a defining feature of the game. The team worked extensively to ensure the fluidity and responsiveness of touch controls, aiming to deliver a combat system that was intuitive, yet deep and rewarding.

The collaboration with publisher Devolver Digital began in 2018. The publisher provided support to expand the game's visibility and reach in the crowded mobile gaming market.

== Reception ==
Upon release, Bleak Sword received generally positive reviews from critics, who praised its distinctive art style, responsive controls, and challenging gameplay. It was commended for its smart use of touch-based combat mechanics, which brought a refreshing take to the action RPG genre. The game was recognized for its art style, which fused minimalist pixel art with rich atmospheric effects to deliver a unique aesthetic.
