= Oneida (band) =

American experimental rock band

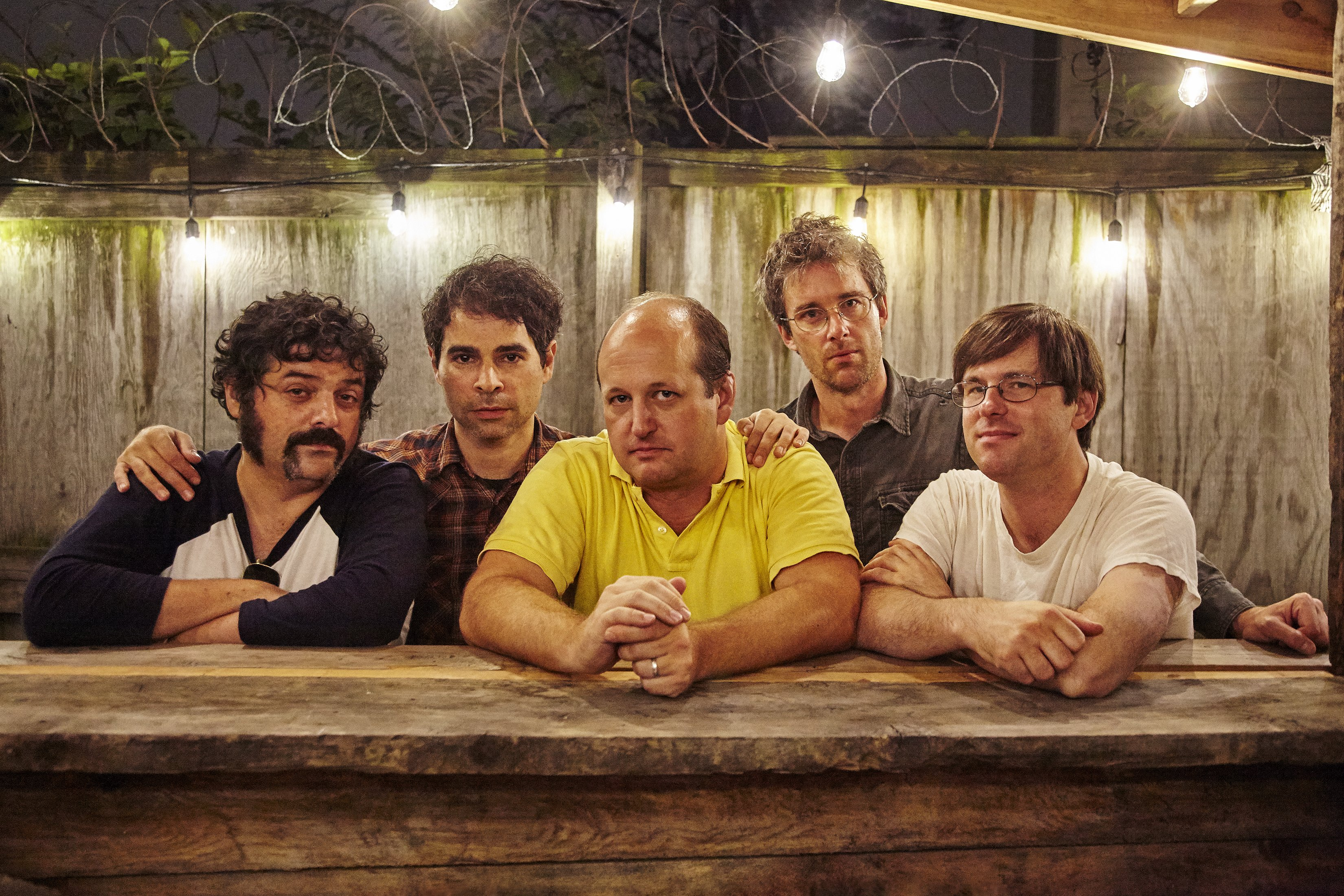

Background information
- Origin: Brooklyn, New York, United States
- Genres: Experimental rock
- Years active: 1997–present
- Labels: Joyful Noise Recordings, Jagjaguwar
- Members: Kid Millions; Bobby Matador; Hanoi Jane; Shahin Motia; Barry London
- Past members: PCRZ (aka Papa Crazee or Pat Sullivan); Double Rainbow (aka Phil Manley)
- Website: www.enemyhogs.com/site/

Oneida is an American experimental rock band from Brooklyn, New York, United States. Their music incorporates improvisation, repetition, driving rhythms, antique and analog equipment, and eclecticism. They have been described as being influenced by psychedelic rock, space rock, krautrock, early electronic music, noise rock, and minimalism.

In the late 1990s, Oneida pioneered a culture of performance in nontraditional spaces throughout Brooklyn, NY, including warehouses, vacant theaters and storefronts, parking lots and garages, boats, and industrial facilities. They are recognized as the progenitors of what would become a thriving and widely influential Brooklyn experimental rock scene. They have also been recognized in gallery and museum culture, performing at the Guggenheim Museum, MoMA PS1, MassMOCA, and the Knovxille Museum of Art, among others.

== Timeline ==
Oneida formed in Brooklyn, NY in 1997. Their first album, A Place Called El Shaddai's, was released on New York's Turnbuckle Records in September of that year, accompanied by a nationwide tour. Another album followed on Turnbuckle in 1998, titled Enemy Hogs. Oneida continued touring relentlessly and began performing in industrial and non-traditional spaces in Brooklyn, including warehouses, lofts, and an iron foundry, giving birth over the next several years to a Brooklyn-based experimental rock scene that would find wider acclaim in the following decade.

Further records and tours followed, including a 2001 performance at the El Mocambo club in Toronto with the Constantines and Grand Total. After the disappearance of Turnbuckle, the band released albums on Jagjaguwar Records for the next decade-plus.

In 2002, the band released a double LP, Each One Teach One, which begins with two especially long tracks, Sheets of Easter and Antibiotics, the former over fourteen minutes long, the latter more than sixteen. Both of these songs consist of one repeated riff (with a few short interludes on Antibiotics), which typifies the band's frequent use of repetition.

The band also operates Brah Records, originally an imprint of Jagjaguwar. The label has released records by Dirty Faces, Parts & Labor, Oakley Hall, Home, Company, and an Oneida/Plastic Crimewave Sound split 12".

In September 2007, the group celebrated 10 years of existence with a concert at the P.S. 1 Contemporary Art Center in New York City. Also in 2007, Oneida built and opened The Ocropolis, a recording studio/performance space on the Williamsburg waterfront in Brooklyn occupying the basement level of the Monster Island building. The Ocropolis saw Oneida record works of their own, record numerous other bands, and perform publicly in extended performances in collaboration with numerous other musicians and the visual artists of the Secret Project Robot gallery and projection collective. The Ocropolis closed, and Monster Island was demolished, in 2012—a casualty of Brooklyn's waterfront gentrification. A Trader Joe's was built on the ruins.

In June 2008, it was announced that the band would be releasing a triptych of new records, referred to as the "Thank Your Parents" series. The first of these was Preteen Weaponry, which was released in August 2008, and the second was a triple album, Rated O, released in July 2009. The final release, the experimental Absolute II, followed in 2011.

Also in 2008, the band began a series of extended live improvisational performances, most notably staged at the All Tomorrow's Parties festivals in the UK and US, as well as at their own Brooklyn studio, the Ocropolis. These performances lasted 10–12 hours of uninterrupted playing, and festival participants were invited to join Oneida onstage. During these performances Oneida was joined by Mike Watt, members of Flaming Lips, Portishead, Boredoms, Yo La Tengo, Dead C, Godspeed You! Black Emperor, and more. The band performed their third extended 'Ocropolis' set at the ATP I'll Be Your Mirror festival curated by ATP & Portishead in September 2011 in Asbury Park, New Jersey.

A List of Burning Mountains, released in 2012, was "the last transmission from the Ocropolis" prior to its abandonment and destruction. The band then retreated from the studio for a number of years in favor of the stage, accumulating and releasing a variety of ultra-limited, uncompromising releases that documented a continuously unfolding journey over the next few years. Much of this work was released on a cassette-only series known as "The Brah Tapes", first released 2014-2015 (and eventually compiled digitally in 2021).

In 2016, Oneida released an album-length collaboration with composer Rhys Chatham, titled What's Your Sign?, supported by performances in New York and the UK; and in 2017 the band signed with Joyful Noise Recordings, from which base they have released the albums Romance, Success, and Expensive Air, along with numerous singles, limited-edition lathe cuts and flexidiscs, and compilation tracks.

== Members ==
Given names according to ASCAP/BMI songwriting credits.

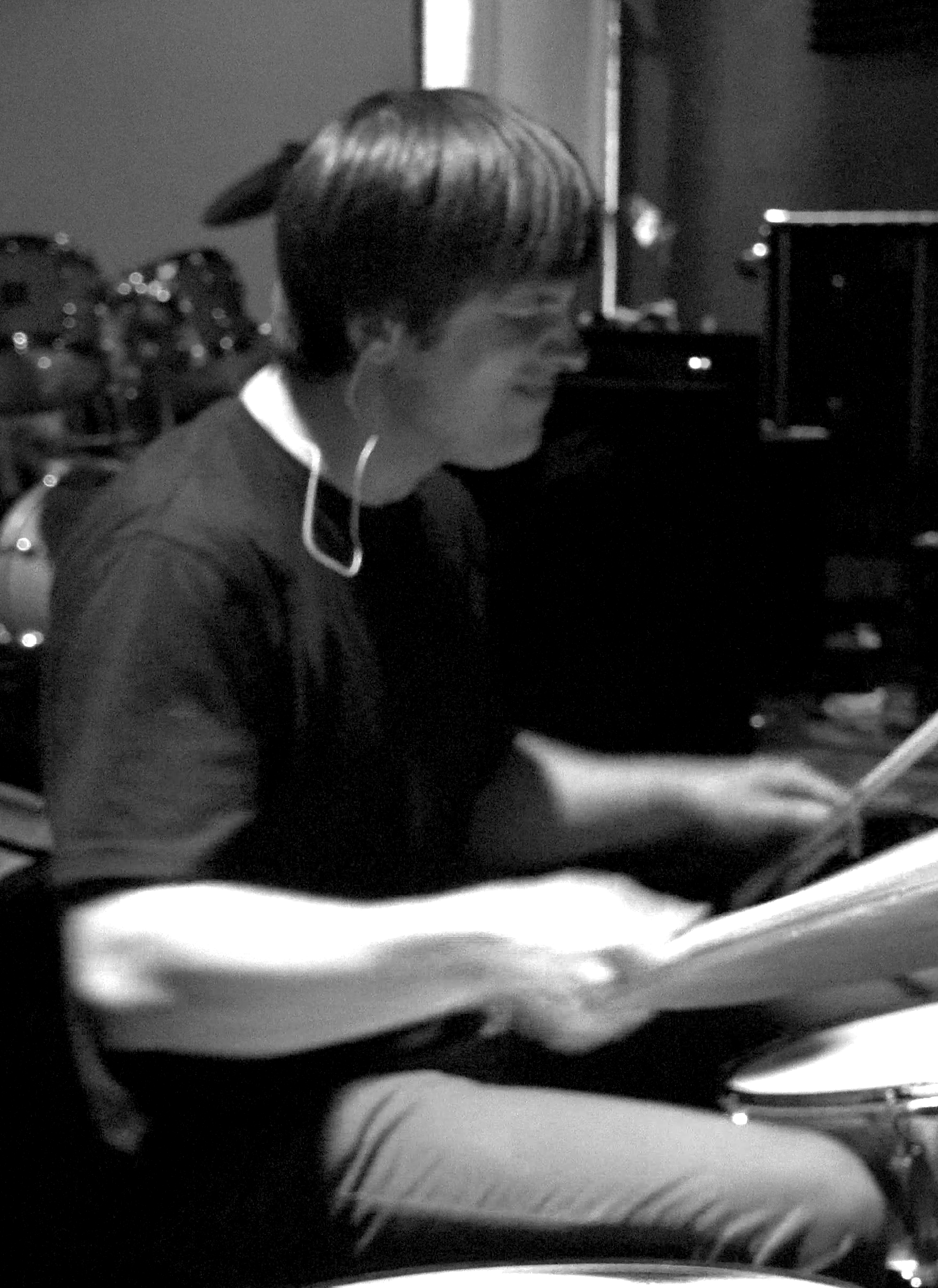
Kid Millions drumming at Palisades

- Kid Millions (John Colpitts) – drums, vocals (1997–present)
  - Formerly of Adhesive X and Pocket Monster
- Bobby Matador – organ, guitar, bass, vocals (1997–present)
- Hanoi Jane (Francis McDermott) – guitar, bass (1997–present)
- Barry London – synths, organ, effects (2008–present)
- Showtime (Shahin Motia) – guitar (2008–present)
  - Also in Ex Models

=== Previous members ===
- PCRZ aka Papa Crazee (Pat Sullivan) – guitar, keyboards (1997–2002)
  - Now with Oakley Hall
- Double Rainbow (Phil Manley) – guitar
  - Now with Trans Am and The Fucking Champs

== Discography ==
=== Studio albums ===
- A Place Called El Shaddai's (Turnbuckle, 1997)
- Enemy Hogs (Turnbuckle, 1999: re-issued by Jagjaguwar, 2001)
- Come on Everybody Let's Rock (Jagjaguwar, 2000)
- Anthem of the Moon (Jagjaguwar, 2001)
- Each One Teach One (Jagjaguwar, 2002)
- Secret Wars (Jagjaguwar, 2004)
- The Wedding (Jagjaguwar, 2005)
- Happy New Year (Jagjaguwar, 2006)
- Preteen Weaponry (Jagjaguwar, 2008)
- Rated O (Jagjaguwar, 2009)
- Absolute II (Jagjaguwar, 2011)
- A List of the Burning Mountains (Jagjaguwar, 2012)
- The Brah Tapes (Brah, 2015)
- What's Your Sign? with Rhys Chatham (Northern Spy Records, 2016)
- Romance (Joyful Noise Recordings, 2018)
- Success (Joyful Noise Recordings, 2022)
- Expensive Air (Joyful Noise Recordings, 2024)

=== Compilations ===
- Seeds of Contemplation (Jagjaguwar, 2007)

=== EPs ===
- Steel Rod (Jagjaguwar, 2000)
- Atheists, Reconsider (Arena Rock Recording Co., 2002) /split with Liars
- Nice. / Splittin' Peaches (Ace Fu, 2004)

=== Singles ===
- "Best Friends" / "The Land of Bugs" (Turnbuckle, 1998)
- "Bobby's Black Thumb" (Jagjaguwar, 2002) /split with Songs: Ohia
- "Anthem of the Moon" (Jagjaguwar, 2002) / split with Brother JT
- "Caesar's Column" (Rough Trade, 2004)
- "Split" (Brah, 2005) / split with Plastic Crimewave Sound
- "Heads Ain't Ready" (These Are Not Records, 2008)
- "Green Corridor" (Altin Village & Mine, 2010) / split with Pterodactyl
- "Equinox" / "Last Hit" (Xhol Recordings, 2010)
- "Human Factor" (Limited Appeal, 2010)
- "Split" (Rocket Recordings, 2011) / split with Mugstar
- "Town Crier" (Joyful Noise Recordings, 2017)
- "Cockfights" (Joyful Noise Recordings, 2018) / split with Yonatan Gat
- " Tusko" w/ Mike Watt (Joyful Noise Recordings, 2024)

=== Live albums ===
- Street People (Bulb, 2001) /Split with 25 Suaves
- Fine European Food and Wine (Scotch Tapes, 2010)
- Live at Secret Project Robot (Safety Meeting, 2017) /Featuring James McNew of Yo La Tengo and Lee Ranaldo
