= Constantines (album) =

Studio album by Constantines
- Released: June 5, 2001
- Genres: Indie rock, alternative rock
- Length: 42:55
- Label: Three Gut

Constantines chronology
Constantines (2001)	Shine a Light (2003)

Professional ratings
Review scores
Source	Rating
AllMusic	4/5 stars
Pitchfork Media	8.7/10

Constantines is the debut album by the Constantines. It was released June 5, 2001 on the Canadian record label Three Gut Records. It was nominated for a 2002 Juno Award under the category Best Alternative Album. In following years, the band's popularity grew due to their critically acclaimed album Shine a Light, and Constantines was subsequently re-released internationally in 2004 on Sub Pop.

The album was shortlisted for the Polaris Heritage Prize at the 2025 Polaris Music Prize.

== Track listing ==
1. "Arizona" – 4:15
2. "The Long Distance Four" – 2:23
3. "Some Party" – 3:19
4. "Young Offenders" – 3:44
5. "Justice" – 4:14
6. "Seven A.M." – 4:04
7. "No Ecstasy" – 2:09
8. "Hyacinth Blues" – 3:25
9. "St. You" – 3:23
10. "The McKnight Life" – 2:46
11. "Steal This Sound" – 3:24
12. "To the Lullabies" – 2:30
13. "Little Instruments" – 3:19
