= Moody Motorcycle =

Studio album by Human Highway
- Released: August 19, 2008
- Genre: Indie rock; pop
- Label: Secret City; Suicide Squeeze
- Producer: Jim Guthrie

Moody Motorcycle is the only studio album by Canadian indie rock duo Human Highway. It was released on August 19, 2008 through Secret City Records in Canada and Suicide Squeeze Records in the United States.

== Critical reception ==
Professional ratings
Aggregate scores
Source	Rating
Metacritic	71/100
Review scores
Source	Rating
AllMusic	4/5 stars
Now	3/5 Ns
Prefix	8.5/10
Pitchfork	5.7/10
PopMatters	7/10
Slant	3/5 stars
Spin	3/5 stars
Tiny Mix Tapes	3.5/5 marks

Moody Motorcycle was met with generally favorable reviews from music critics. At Metacritic, which assigns a normalized rating out of 100 to reviews from mainstream publications, the album received an average score of 71, based on nine reviews.

Andrew Winistorfer of Prefix magazine praised the album, calling it "a deft reappropriation and re-imagining of the harmonic pop of the Everly Brothers, Simon and Garfunkel, and Crosby, Stills, and Nash". AllMusic's Bruce Eder wrote: "what is plainer throughout is that someone has finally delivered a follow-up to the Beach Boys' Friends album, dwelling on moments and sensibilities that slip past most of us in the normal course of a day". Matthew Fiander of PopMatters declared: "it is nice to hear a pop record like Moody Motorcycle, not just to wind down the summer, but to combat some other indie rock trends". Josh Constine of Tiny Mix Tapes stated: "while enduring a few accidents, the group's fresh folk approach shows promise".

In mixed reviews, Tim Perlich of Now wrote: "it's just the sort of gently strummed, sweetly harmonized and vaguely familiar-sounding pop music replete with quirky lyrical turns that is designed to make indie-rock-obsessed music hacks swoon. And they will". Wilson McBee of Slant stated: "Moody Motorcycle is easily Thorburn's least ambitious effort, evidenced by the inclusion of song sketches like 'Ode to Abner' and tracks that seem like outtakes from his Islands work (for example, the title cut and 'Pretty Hair'), and yet in its many moments of off-the-cuff beauty the album proves, perhaps even more than the meticulously executed "Arm's Way", the extraordinary talents of this oft-misunderstood Canadian". Jessica Suarez of Spin noted: "the title track gusts in more forcefully, but on the duo's best songs, they harmonize like Simon & Garfunkel shutting their eyes against approaching shades of winter". Tyler Grisham of Pitchfork concluded: "Human Highway work best in this inviting, flickering-campfire headspace, and for an amiable if ephemeral 40 minutes, Moody Motorcycle offers a pleasant soundtrack to the dwindling days of the summer".

== Track listing ==
No.	Title	Lyrics	Music	Length
1.	"The Sound"	Nicholas Thorburn; James Edward Guthrie	Nicholas Thorburn; James Edward Guthrie	2:44
2.	"All Day"	Thorburn; Guthrie	Guthrie	3:32
3.	"Get Lost"	Thorburn	Thorburn	3:52
4.	"What World"	Thorburn; Guthrie	Guthrie	3:33
5.	"Sleep Talking"	Thorburn	Thorburn	3:34
6.	"Moody Motorcycle"	Thorburn; Guthrie	Guthrie	3:11
7.	"My Beach"	Thorburn	Thorburn	2:55
8.	"Ode to Abner"	Thorburn	Thorburn	1:59
9.	"Pretty Hair"	Thorburn	Thorburn	3:46
10.	"Vision Failing"	Thorburn	Thorburn	3:16
11.	"Duties of a Lighthouse Keeper"	Thorburn; Guthrie	Guthrie	3:51
12.	"I Wish I Knew"	Dick Dallas	Billy Taylor	3:04

== Personnel ==
- Nicholas "Nick Diamonds" Thorburn – lyrics (tracks: 1–11), performer
- James Edward "Jim" Guthrie – lyrics (tracks: 1, 2, 4, 6, 11), performer, producer, recording, mixing
- Patrice Agbokou – bass (track 7)
- Art Mullin – mixing
- Jeff "Fedge" Elliott – mastering
- Sasha Barr – art direction
- Jaime Hogge – photography, layout
