= Now, More Than Ever =

Studio album by Jim Guthrie
- Released: 18 November 2003 (Canada) / 7 June 2010 (3 Syllables Records)
- Recorded: 2003, The House of Miracles
- Genres: Folk, indie pop
- Length: 44:12
- Labels: Three Gut Records, 3 Syllables Records
- Producer: Andy Magoffin

Jim Guthrie chronology
Morning Noon Night (2002)	Now, More Than Ever (2003)

Professional ratings
Aggregate scores
Source	Rating
Metacritic	87/100
Review scores
Source	Rating
AllMusic	4.5/5 stars
Alternative Press	3.5/5 stars
Cokemachineglow	85%
Pitchfork	8.2/10 (Note: Pitchfork initially awarded this album its Best New Music designation, though this designation no longer appears on the review.)
Slant Magazine	3.5/5 stars
Stylus	8.6/10
Tiny Mix Tapes	4.5/5 stars

Now, More Than Ever is an album by Jim Guthrie. It was mastered by George Graves and sequenced by Kristian Galberg. Stephen Evans did the album's artwork.

An "extended edition", featuring a second disc of rarities, B-sides, and demo versions of some of the album's songs was released in 2010.

== Track listing ==
=== Original ===
1. "Problem With Solutions" – 4:34
2. "All Gone" – 4:07
3. "So Small" – 3:58
4. "Save It" – 4:35
5. "Broken Chair" – 4:05
6. "Lovers Do" – 6:16
7. "Time Is a Force" – 5:27
8. "Now, More Than Ever" – 3:24
9. "The Evangelist" – 5:10
10. "You Are Far (Do You Exist?)" – 2:31

=== 2010 bonus disc ===
1. "Hug Me 'Til I'm Blue"
2. "Time Is a Force (Demo)"
3. "All Gone (String Only Mix)"
4. "Lot to Learn"
5. "Save It (8-Track Demo)"
6. "Something Don't Feel Right"
7. "Lovers Do (String Outro)"
8. "So Small (4-Track Demo)"
9. "All Gone (Slap Chop Mix)"
10. "Wuthering Heights"
11. "Love Hurts"
12. "Ain't Got No/I Got Life"

== Additional musicians ==
- Bry Webb: Banjo
- Mike Olsen: Cello
- Andy Magoffin: Additional Percussion, Chanting
- Evan Clarke: Drums
- Simon Osborne: Bass
- Owen Pallett: Violins, Viola, String Arrangements
- Laura May Elston: Sax, Flute, Clarinet (So Small)
- Jamie Thompson: Second Kit (Now, More than Ever)
- Melanie Archibald: Lyrical influence (Save It)

== Chart activity ==
The album debuted on the Top 50 Albums from Canadian Campus/Community Radio Airplay at #14 on 28 November 2003, peaking on those charts at #3 position on 9 January 2004 and appearing for the final time the week of 19 March 2004. It spent a total of 8 weeks in the top 10.

== Awards ==
Now, More than Ever was nominated in the category Alternative Album of the Year at the 2005 Juno Awards.
