= Secret Wars (album) =

Studio album by Oneida
- Released: 26 January 2004
- Recorded: 2003
- Studio: Rare Book Room and The Travel Agency, Brooklyn, NY
- Genre: Rock
- Length: 40:25
- Label: Jagjaguwar (US); Three Gut Records (CAN); Rough Trade (UK)

Oneida chronology
Each One Teach One (2002)	Secret Wars (2004)	The Wedding (2005)

Professional ratings
Aggregate scores
Source	Rating
Metacritic	83/100
Review scores
Source	Rating
AllMusic	4.5/5 stars
Alternative Press	4.5/5 stars
Entertainment Weekly	A−
The Guardian	1/5 stars
Mojo	4/5 stars
Now	4/5 stars
Pitchfork	7.8/10
Spin	A
Tiny Mix Tapes	4.5/5 stars
Uncut	4/5 stars

Secret Wars is a 2004 album by Oneida.

== Track listing ==
All songs by Oneida (John William Colpitts, Francis Wells McDermott, Robertson S. Tacher).

Side A

1. "Treasure Plane" – 3:28
2. "Caesar's Column" – 4:39
3. "Capt. Bo Dignifies the Allegations with a Response" – 2:03
4. "Wild Horses" – 4:03
5. "$50 Tea" – 4:47

Side B

6. "The Last Act, Every Time" – 2:32
7. "The Winter Shaker" – 4:36
8. "Changes in the City" – 14:14

== Personnel ==
Oneida

- Hanoi Jane (Francis McDermott) – guitar, bass
- Fat Bobby (Robertson Thacher) – organ, guitar, bass, vocals
- Kid Millions (John Colpitts) – drums, vocals

Additional personnel

- Kayrock (Karl LaRocca) – gong (on "Caesar's Column"), album design
- Nicolas Verhes – recording engineer (tracks 1–5)
- Samara Lubelski – recording assistant (tracks 1–5)
- Barry London – recording engineer (tracks 6–8)
- Alan Douches – mastering
