= Royal City (album) =

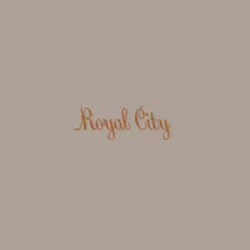

Studio album by Royal City
- Released: June 23, 2009
- Genre: Alternative rock
- Label: Asthmatic Kitty

Royal City chronology
Little Heart's Ease (2004)	Royal City (2009)

Professional ratings
Review scores
Source	Rating
AllMusic	3/5 stars
Pitchfork Media	6.7/10

Royal City is a B-side compilation by Royal City, released on June 23, 2009, on Asthmatic Kitty.

== Track listing ==
1. "Here Comes Success"
2. "Can't You Hear Me Calling"
3. "Postcards"
4. "A Belly Was Made for Wine"
5. "Dog Song"
6. "O You With Your Shirt"
7. "Bad Luck"
8. "The Nations Will Sing"
9. "I Called But You Were Sleeping"
10. "They Came Down"
11. "Is This It?"
12. "In the Autumn"
