= Preteen Weaponry =

Studio album by Oneida
- Released: August 5, 2008
- Recorded: 2008
- Studio: The Ocropolis, Brooklyn, NY
- Genre: Alternative rock, indie rock, krautrock, psychedelic rock
- Length: 39:22
- Label: Jagjaguwar

Oneida chronology
| Happy New Year (2006) | Preteen Weaponry (2008) | Rated O (2009) |

Professional ratings
Review scores
| Source | Rating |
|---|---|
| AllMusic | 4/5 stars |
| The A.V. Club | A− |

Preteen Weaponry is the ninth full-length album by Brooklyn-based Alternative rock/Indie rock/Krautrock/Psychedelic rock band Oneida.

== Track listing ==
All songs by Oneida (John William Colpitts, Barry London, Francis Wells McDermott, Shahin Motia, Robertson S. Thacher).

1. "Preteen Weaponry, Pt. I" – 14:30
2. "Preteen Weaponry, Pt. II" – 11:26
3. "Preteen Weaponry, Pt. III" – 13:53

== Personnel ==
- Hanoi Jane (Francis McDermott) – guitar, bass
- Bobby Matador (Robertson Thacher) – organ, bass, vocals
- Kid Millions (John Colpitts) – drums, vocals

Featuring:

- Barry London – synths, organ, effects, recording engineer
- Shahin Motia – guitar
