= Jet Black (album) =

Studio album by Gentleman Reg
- Released: February 24, 2009
- Genre: Indie pop
- Label: Arts & Crafts
- Producer: Dave Draves

Gentleman Reg chronology
Little Buildings (2008)	Jet Black (2009)

Professional ratings
Review scores
Source	Rating
AllMusic	3/5 stars
Pitchfork	(7.3/10)
PopMatters	(7/10)

Jet Black is the fourth studio album by Canadian singer-songwriter Gentleman Reg, released February 24, 2009. It is his second release on Arts & Crafts, following the compilation Little Buildings in 2008, and his first album of new material since Darby & Joan in 2004.

"You Can't Get it Back" was released as an advance single in fall 2008.

== Track listing ==
No.	Title	Length
1.	"Coastline"	3:35
2.	"To Some It Comes Easy"	4:13
3.	"You Can't Get It Back"	3:22
4.	"When Heroes Change Professions"	3:21
5.	"How We Exit"	3:27
6.	"Rewind"	4:02
7.	"We're in a Thunderstorm"	4:15
8.	"Falling Back"	4:43
9.	"Oh My God"	5:04
10.	"Everlong"	3:57
11.	"Rudy"	4:15

== Personnel ==
The album features contributions from Greg Millson, Bry Webb, Katie Sketch, Elizabeth Powell, Kevin Drew, and Emily Haines.
