= The Wedding (Oneida album) =

Studio album by Oneida
- Released: May 3, 2005
- Studio: Value of Tears and Rare Book Room, Brooklyn, NY
- Genre: Neo-psychedelia; indie rock
- Length: 45:31
- Label: Jagjaguwar (US); Three Gut (CAN); Rough Trade (UK)

Oneida chronology
Secret Wars (2004)	The Wedding (2005)	Happy New Year (2006)

Professional ratings
Aggregate scores
Source	Rating
Metacritic	80/100
Review scores
Source	Rating
AllMusic	4.5/5 stars
Blender	3/5 stars
Cokemachineglow	84%
Drowned in Sound	8/10
Mojo	3.5/5 stars
Now	4/5 stars
PopMatters	8/10
Pitchfork	7.4/10
Stylus	B−
Uncut	8/10

The Wedding is a studio album by American band Oneida. It was released on May 3, 2005 on Jagjaguwar in America, Three Gut in Canada, and Rough Trade in the United Kingdom.

== Track listing ==
All tracks are written by Oneida (John William Colpitts, Francis Wells McDermott, Robertson S. Tacher)

No.	Title	Length
1.	"The Eiger"	2:34
2.	"Lavender"	3:58
3.	"Spirits"	4:20
4.	"Run Through My Hair"	3:01
5.	"High Life"	2:20
6.	"Did I Die"	3:31
7.	"You're Drifting"	3:26
8.	"Charlemagne"	2:27
9.	"Know"	1:46
10.	"Heavenly Choir"	4:17
11.	"Leaves"	2:57
12.	"The Beginning Is Nigh"	7:30
13.	"August Morning Haze"	3:25
Total length:		45:31

== Personnel ==
Oneida

- Hanoi Jane (Francis McDermott) – guitar, bass
- Bobby Matador (Robertson Thacher) – organ, guitar, bass, vocals
- Kid Millions (John Colpitts) – drums, vocals

Additional personnel

- Brian Coughlin – string arrangement, double bass (tracks 1, 5, 7–9, 13)
- Cornelius Dufallo – violin (1, 5, 7–9, 13)
- John Marcus – violin (1, 5, 7–9, 13)
- Maria Hansen – viola (1, 5, 7–9, 13)
- Leigh Stuart – cello (1, 5, 7–9, 13)
- Adam Davison – guitar (3)
- Brad Truax – bass (3)
- Chris Turco – additional drums (7)
- Barry London – sitar (10), mixing
- Emily Manzo – piano (10)
- Phil Manley – additional guitar (12)
- Nicolas Vernhes – additional percussion (12), mixing
