= Rated O =

Studio album by Oneida
- Released: July 7, 2009
- Genre: Alternative rock, indie rock, psychedelic rock
- Length: 113:20
- Label: Jagjaguwar

Oneida chronology
Preteen Weaponry (2008)	Rated O (2009)	Absolute II (2011)

Professional ratings
Review scores
Source	Rating
AllMusic	3.5/5 stars
The Guardian	4/5 stars
Pitchfork	(8.4/10)
PopMatters	(5/10)

Rated O is the tenth full-length album by Brooklyn-based indie rock band by Oneida, released as a triple LP.

== Track listing ==
All tracks are written by Oneida.

Disc 1
No.	Title	Length
1.	"Brownout in Lagos"	5:38
2.	"What's Up, Jackal?"	3:08
3.	"10:30 at the Oasis"	12:35
4.	"Story of O"	7:50
5.	"The Human Factor"	10:28
Total length:		39:39

Disc 2
No.	Title	Length
1.	"The River"	4:33
2.	"I Will Haunt You"	4:08
3.	"The Life You Preferred"	4:38
4.	"Ghost in the Room"	6:18
5.	"Saturday"	6:48
6.	"It Was a Wall"	3:22
7.	"Luxury Travel"	6:04
Total length:		35:51

Disc 3
No.	Title	Length
1.	"O"	13:00
2.	"End of Time"	3:50
3.	"Folk Wisdom"	20:50
Total length:		37:40
