= The Modern Sinner Nervous Man =

EP by Constantines
- Released: April 16, 2002
- Genre: Indie rock, alternative rock
- Length: 11:58
- Label: Suicide Squeeze

Constantines EP chronology
The Modern Sinner Nervous Man (2002)	Nighttime Anytime (2003)

Professional ratings
Review scores
Source	Rating
Allmusic	2.5/5 stars

The Modern Sinner Nervous Man is an EP album by the Constantines. It was released April 16, 2002 on the Suicide Squeeze record label.

== Track listing ==
1. "Dirty Business" – 3:28
2. "Underneath the Stop Sign" – 4:47
3. "Blind Luck" – 3:43

artwork done by Peter Gazendam
