= Romance (Oneida album) =

Studio album by Oneida
- Released: March 9, 2018
- Genre: Alternative rock, Indie rock, Krautrock, Psychedelic rock
- Length: 72:05
- Label: Joyful Noise Recordings

Oneida chronology
What's Your Sign? (2016)	Romance (2018)

Romance is a studio album by the alternative rock band Oneida. It was released in 2018 by Joyful Noise Recordings, to generally positive reviews. It was the first album that the band produced in a studio since the loss of the Ocropolis (the band's dedicated Brooklyn studio), which was destroyed when the Monster Island Building came down in 2011, as a result of gentrification.

== Reception ==
Professional ratings
Review scores
Source	Rating
AllMusic	4/5 stars
Pitchfork	7.4/10
The Spill Magazine	2/5 stars

Pitchfork wrote that Oneida's "12th album, Romance, explores new ground yet again, literally and metaphorically, as an examination of where one fits in the tumult of suddenly inhospitable environments." NPR compared listening to the album's third track ("All In Due Time") to "watching a universe being born."

== Track listing ==
1. "Economy Travel" - 5:15
2. "Bad Habit" - 5:56
3. "All In Due Time" - 3:03
4. "It Was Me" - 3:48
5. "Good Lie" - 6:58
6. "The Lay Of The Land" - 10:42
7. "Cedars" - 5:04
8. "Reputation" - 4:10
9. "Cockfight" - 4:37
10. "Good Cheer" - 4:26
11. "Shepherd's Axe" - 18:12
