= A Thousand Songs =

Studio album by Jim Guthrie
- Released: 2000
- Label: Three Gut

Jim Guthrie chronology
A Thousand Songs (2000)	Morning Noon Night (2002)

Professional ratings
Review scores
Source	Rating
AllMusic	3/5 stars

A Thousand Songs is the debut solo album by Jim Guthrie, released in 2000 on Three Gut Records. It was also the first album ever released by that label. The song "Who Needs What" was covered by the indiepop band Tullycraft on their 2002 album Beat Surf Fun. The album was reissued in 2015 with 11 bonus tracks which consisted of completely re-recorded songs from the original album.

== Track listing ==
1. Introduction
2. Santana's Theme
3. Jigsaw Puzzle
4. Not Yalk's Requiem
5. Mr. Work's Stubborn
6. I Love Broken Shoes
7. The Fantabulous World of Jimmy 3-Guts
8. Who Needs What
9. I Don't Wanna Be a Rockstar
10. Dirty Fingernail Dreams
11. Thousand Songs
12. Audio Pepsi
13. Trust
14. Sexy Drummer
15. Not a Word
16. Invisible Gem
17. Wear in the World
18. Shape of Things
19. Let's Get in a Fight
20. Focus on Floor Care
21. Gamera
22. Repression's Waltz
23. Roads and Paper Routes
24. And We Got Older
