= Constantines Play Young / Unintended Play Lightfoot =

Constantines Play Young/Unintended Play Lightfoot

Studio album (split) by Constantines / The Unintended
- Released: 2006
- Genre: Indie rock
- Label: Blue Fog

Professional ratings
Review scores
Source	Rating
Being There	link

Constantines Play Young/Unintended Play Lightfoot is a 2006 split album released only on vinyl by independent record label Blue Fog Recordings. The LP features Canadian indie rock band the Constantines covering four songs by Neil Young on side one, and Canadian supergroup The Unintended performing songs by Gordon Lightfoot on side two.

== Track listing ==
Side 1
Constantines Play Young

1. "Don't Be Denied" (from Time Fades Away – 1973)
2. "Transformer Man" (from Trans – 1982)
3. "Don't Cry No Tears" (from Zuma – 1975)
4. "Shots" (from Re-ac-tor – 1981)

Side 2
Unintended Play Lightfoot

1. "Rosanna" (from The Way I Feel – 1967)
2. "Redwood Hills" (from Summer Side of Life – 1971)
3. "The Way I Feel" (from Lightfoot! – 1966)
4. "Walls" (from The Way I Feel – 1967)
