= Kensington Heights =

Studio album by Constantines
- Released: April 15, 2008
- Recorded: 2007
- Genres: Indie rock, alternative rock
- Length: 48:10
- Label: Arts & Crafts

Constantines chronology
Tournament of Hearts (2005)	Kensington Heights (2008)

Professional ratings
Review scores
Source	Rating
AllMusic	3.5/5 stars
Paste	(Positive)
Pitchfork	(6.6/10)

Kensington Heights is the fourth full-length album by the Constantines. It was released on the Arts & Crafts record label on April 15, 2008, in Canada, and on April 29, 2008, in the US.

The track "Hard Feelings" was released as the album's first single.

The lyrics of the track "Do What You Can Do" include a reference to organist Diane Bish.

The album was produced and mixed by Jeff McMurrich and mastered by Noah Mintz.

== Track listing ==
1. "Hard Feelings" – 3:25
2. "Million Star Hotel" – 4:43
3. "Trans Canada" – 3:03
4. "Shower of Stones" – 3:05
5. "Our Age" – 3:39
6. "Time Can Be Overcome" – 5:44
7. "Brother Run Them Down" – 3:24
8. "Credit River" – 2:44
9. "I Will Not Sing a Hateful Song" – 4:09
10. "New King" – 4:11
11. "Life or Death" – 4:57
12. "Do What You Can Do" – 4:51
