= Shine a Light (Constantines album) =

Studio album by Constantines
- Released: August 19, 2003
- Recorded: December 2002 and January 2003
- Studio: The Woodshed and Chemical Sound (Toronto, Ontario)
- Genre: Indie rock, alternative rock
- Length: 46:30
- Label: Three Gut, Sub Pop Records

Constantines chronology
Constantines (2001)	Shine a Light (2003)	Tournament of Hearts (2005)

Shine a Light is the second full-length album released by the Constantines, and their first to be released internationally on the Sub Pop record label. The album was recorded in December 2002 in The Woodshed and January 2003 at Chemical Song, Respectively. It was the first album to feature keyboard player Will Kidman as a member of the band. The album also features some saxophone assistance from Jonas Berkeley.

== Reception ==
Professional ratings
Aggregate scores
Source	Rating
Metacritic	83/100
Review scores
Source	Rating
AllMusic	4.5/5 stars
Alternative Press	4/5
Now	4/5
Pitchfork	8.3/10
Uncut	3/5 stars

Pitchfork placed Shine a Light at number 172 on its list of top 200 albums of the 2000s. It was nominated for a 2004 Juno Award under the category Alternative Album of the Year.

== Track listing ==
1. "National Hum" – 2:49
2. "Shine a Light" – 4:47
3. "Nighttime Anytime (It's Alright)" – 4:13
4. "Insectivora" – 3:56
5. "Young Lions" – 3:50
6. "Goodbye Baby & Amen" – 4:57
7. "On to You" – 4:36
8. "Poison" – 3:36
9. "Scoundrel Babes" – 2:44
10. "Tiger & Crane" – 3:13
11. "Tank Commander (Hung Up in a Warehouse Town)" – 4:02
12. "Sub-Domestic" – 3:36
