= Feuermusik =

Canadian experimental jazz duo

- Origin: Toronto, Ontario, Canada
- Genres: experimental jazz
- Years active: 2004–2010
- Past members: Jeremy Strachan; Gus Weinkauf

Feuermusik was a Canadian experimental jazz duo based in Toronto, Ontario, active in the 2000s. Consisting of former Rockets Red Glare members Jeremy Strachan and Gus Weinkauf, the band's instrumentation consisted exclusively of saxophone and a set of amplified plastic and metal buckets for percussion.

== History ==
Strachan and Weinkauf formed Feuermusik in 2004. The band's debut album, Goodbye Lucille, was released independently in 2006. It received substantial play on community and campus radio stations. The song "Doppelspiel" was later named as a shortlisted nominee for the 2007 Echo Songwriting Prize.

Their second album, No Contest, followed in 2008. They continued to perform in the Toronto area, sometimes with additional musicians. In 2009, the pair performed at Sappyfest in Sackville, and in 2010, they performed at the Halifax Pop Explosion festival.
