= Oakley Hall (band) =

American band

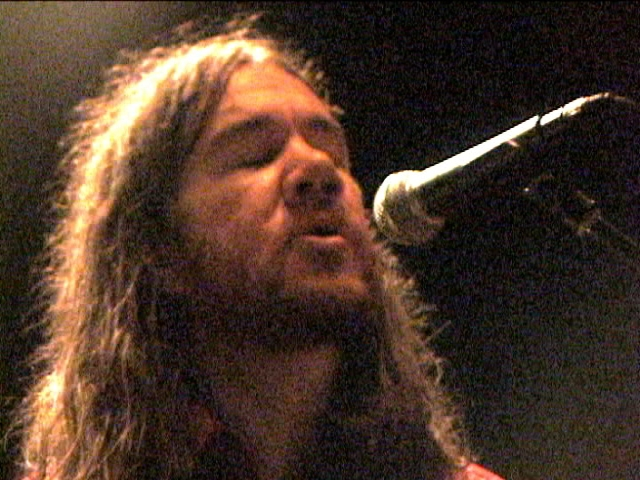
- Pat Sullivan in 2006

Background information
- Origin: New York City, United States
- Genres: Rock; folk rock
- Years active: 2002–present
- Labels: Merge Records
- Members: Jesse Barnes; Rachel Cox; Patrick Sullivan; Claudia Mogel; Fred Wallace
- Website: Oakley Hall at Merge Records

Oakley Hall is an American folk rock band based in Brooklyn, New York.

The group was founded in 2002 and is named for Oakley Hall, an American novelist. The group's songs combine elements of rock, bluegrass, and old-time music, prominently featuring the male-female vocal harmonies of lead vocalists Patrick Sullivan and Rachel Cox. Rather than imitating the style of commercial country or bluegrass, the group's melodies more closely recall old American folk songs and ballads, though often supported by a driving rock beat. In addition to the typical guitars, bass guitar, and drums, the group also features an electrified violin, an electric guitar tuned like a five-string banjo, and a lap steel guitar.

== History ==
Although based in New York, most of the group's members are not originally from that state: Patrick Sullivan is from New England, Rachel Cox is from North Carolina, Jesse Barnes is from Maryland, Fred Wallace is from Mississippi, Claudia Mogel is from New York, and Greg Anderson is from Florida. Sullivan is a former member of Oneida.

The above line-up was established in November 2004. Shortly after releasing the group's first album in 2005 their label Bulb Records went out of business, delaying the release of the second album Second Guessing. This led to only a brief pause between it and the release of their third effort, Gypsum Strings in 2006. Released on Oneida's label Brah Records, a subsidiary of Jagjaguwar, this was their first record to gain wide distribution, and the band toured extensively to support it in the United States, Canada, and Europe. In the spring of 2007 they toured alongside Bright Eyes, and signed to Merge Records. The fourth album, I'll Follow You, was released in September 2007.

In August 2007, drummer Greg Anderson was replaced by Pat Wood. In late 2007, while on tour with Cake, the band temporarily reduced to a quartet as Wallace and Mogel took a break. In January 2008 Ezra Oklan took over on drums.

In January 2008 the band performed "She Belongs to Me" as part of The Royal Albert Hall Project – the inaugural show of the 2008 New York Guitar Festival in the Winter Garden of the World Financial Center in NYC.

== Recognition ==
I'll Follow You appeared in many 'Best-of-2007' lists including Time Out, the Washington Post , and Harp .

== Members ==
- Ezra Oklan – drums
- Jesse Barnes – electric bass guitar, vocals
- Rachel Cox – vocals, guitar
- (Claudia Mogel – fiddle, vocals)
- Patrick Sullivan – vocals, guitar, electric organ
- (Fred Wallace – electric guitar (tuned like a banjo), lap steel)

== Former members ==
- Pat Wood – drums
- Greg Anderson – drums
- Leah Blesoff – guitar, vocals
- Ted Southern – lap steel guitar
- Will Dyar – drums
- Steve Tesh – acoustic guitar, vocals
- Ed Kurz – guitar

== Discography ==
=== Studio albums ===
- Oakley Hall (2005), Bulb Records
- Second Guessing (2006), Amish Records
- Gypsum Strings (2006), Brah Records
- I'll Follow You (2007), Merge Records

=== EPs ===
- Sweet & Low (2003), self released
