= Morning Noon Night =

Studio album by Jim Guthrie
- Released: 2002
- Genre: Indie pop/Indie rock
- Length: 46:08
- Label: Three Gut Records

Jim Guthrie chronology
| A Thousand Songs (2000) | Morning Noon Night (2002) | Now, More Than Ever (2003) |

Professional ratings
Review scores
| Source | Rating |
|---|---|
| AllMusic | 4/5 stars |

Morning Noon Night is Jim Guthrie's second album on Three Gut Records.

== Track listing ==
1. "In The Hour Of Her Sore Need" – 1:45
2. "Evil Thoughts" – 3:49
3. "Virtue" – 3:37
4. "3 AM" – 3:23
5. "Turn Musician" – 3:22
6. "Days I Need Off" – 5:10
7. "Trouble" – 5:36
8. "Toy Computer" – 2:35
9. "Houndz of Love" – 3:50
10. "Communication" – 3:39
11. "Right And Right Again" – 2:45
12. "1901" – 6:37
