= Tournament of Hearts (album) =

Studio album by Constantines
- Released: 27 September 2005
- Genres: Indie rock, alternative rock
- Length: 36:00
- Label: Three Gut

Constantines chronology
| Shine a Light (2003) | Tournament of Hearts (2005) | Kensington Heights (2008) |

Professional ratings
Aggregate scores
| Source | Rating |
|---|---|
| Metacritic | 80/100 |
Review scores
| Source | Rating |
| AllMusic | 4.5/5 stars |
| Drowned in Sound | 8/10 |
| Entertainment Weekly | A− |
| NME | 8/10 |
| Pitchfork | 7.6/10 |
| PopMatters | 5/10 |
| Rolling Stone | 3.5/5 stars |
| Slant Magazine | 4/5 stars |
| Stylus | A− |
| Under the Radar | 7/10 |

Tournament of Hearts is the third full-length album by the Constantines. It was released 27 September 2005, on the Canadian label Three Gut Records. Sub Pop released the album outside of Canada two weeks later, on October 11, 2005. In an interview with CBC Radio 3 to promote the release of Reunion Tour, John K. Samson, the singer/guitarist of The Weakerthans, claimed that the Constantines chose the album title at his urging.

== Track listing ==
1. "Draw Us Lines" – 4:16
2. "Hotline Operator" – 3:39
3. "Love in Fear" – 3:55
4. "Lizaveta" – 3:34
5. "Soon Enough" – 4:00
6. "Working Full-Time" – 3:56
7. "Good Nurse" – 3:29
8. "Thieves" – 3:30
9. "You Are a Conductor" – 3:59
10. "Windy Road" – 2:29
