= Darby & Joan (album) =

Studio album by Gentleman Reg
- Released: 2004
- Genre: Indie pop
- Label: Three Gut Records

Gentleman Reg chronology
Make Me Pretty (2002)	Darby & Joan (2004)	Little Buildings (2008)

Darby & Joan is the third album by Canadian singer-songwriter Gentleman Reg, released in 2004 on Three Gut Records. Vermue said he "wanted a bigger sound on this album, more production, bigger arrangements, and just generally better quality", and he didn't want "to make another typical 'indie' record, whatever that may be".

== Reception ==
The Toronto Star said the album "is so buoyantly tuneful that you have to listen hard to hear the disappointment ... it isn't until the disc's concluding track, which lushly marries Reg's soul-bearing vocals and guitars with Owen Pallett's violin and viola, that the music entirely matches the bittersweet mood". Overall, they rated it as a "persistently infectious, smartly executed pop album".

== Track listing ==
1. "Bundle"
2. "Over My Head"
3. "First Time Everything"
4. "It's Not Safe"
5. "All My Love"
6. "Untouchable"
7. "The Deal"
8. "You Make Me Tall"
9. "Don't Bring Me Down"
10. "The Boyfriend Song"
11. "Get it Together"
12. "Navy Brown"
