= Each One Teach One (Oneida album) =

Studio album by Oneida
- Released: October 1, 2002
- Recorded: 2000–2001
- Studio: High Five Studios, Brooklyn, NY and Tarquin Studios, Bridgeport, CT
- Genre: Psychedelic rock
- Length: 58:10
- Label: Jagjaguwar (CD); Version City (vinyl)

Oneida chronology
Anthem Of the Moon (2001)	Each One Teach One (2002)	Secret Wars (2004)

Professional ratings
Review scores
Source	Rating
AllMusic	4.5/5 stars
Pitchfork	(6.5/10)

Each One Teach One is a 2002 double album by Oneida. Prefix magazine described the record as "[a] sprawling monster of an album...equal parts compelling and difficult."

== Track listing ==
All songs by Oneida (John William Colpitts, Francis Wells McDermott, Patrick R. Sullivan, Robertson S. Thacher).

=== CD release ===
Disc one

1. "Sheets of Easter" – 14:13
2. "Antibiotics" – 16:37

Disc two

1. "Each One Teach One" – 3:25
2. "People of the North" – 4:30
3. "Number Nine" – 2:54
4. "Sneak into the Woods" – 1:59
5. "Rugaru" – 6:34
6. "Black Chamber" – 3:07
7. "No Label" – 4:58

=== Vinyl release ===
Side A

1. "Sheets of Easter" – 14:13

Side B

1. "Each One Teach One" – 3:25
2. "People of the North" – 4:30
3. "Number Nine" – 2:54
4. "Sneak into the Woods" – 1:59

Side C

1. "Antibiotics" – 16:37

Side D

1. "Rugaru" – 6:34
2. "Black Chamber" – 3:07
3. "No Label" – 4:58

Note: the version of "People of the North" is an earlier recording than the version released on Oneida's previous album Anthem of the Moon.

== Personnel ==
Oneida

- PCRZ (Pat Sullivan) – guitar, vocals
- Hanoi Jane (Francis McDermott) – guitar, bass
- Bobby Matador (Robertson Thacher) – organ, guitar, bass, vocals
- Kid Millions (John Colpitts) – drums, vocals

Additional personnel

- Wolfie – additional woodie (on "Antibiotics")
- Phil Ballmann – additional percussion (on "Black Chamber")
- Peter Katis – recording, mixing
