= Happy New Year (album) =

Studio album by Oneida
- Released: July 11, 2006
- Studio: Last Gasp Studios, the Sunset Grill, and Rare Book Room in Brooklyn, NY; and Old South Church in Boston, MA
- Genre: Alternative rock, indie rock, krautrock, psychedelic rock
- Length: 44:07
- Label: Jagjaguwar

Oneida chronology
The Wedding (2005)	Happy New Year (2006)	Preteen Weaponry (2008)

Professional ratings
Review scores
Source	Rating
AllMusic	4/5 stars
Pitchfork	(7.2/10)
PopMatters	8/10 stars
Stylus Magazine	(B)
Tiny Mix Tapes	3.5/5 stars

Happy New Year is the eighth studio album by alternative rock band Oneida. It was released in 2006 through Jagjaguwar.

== Track listing ==
All songs by Oneida (John William Colpitts, Francis Wells McDermott, Robertson S. Tacher).

Side A

1. "Distress" – 3:21
2. "Happy New Year" – 2:33
3. "The Adversary" – 5:15
4. "Up with People" – 7:49
5. "Pointing Fingers" – 2:06

Side B

6. "History's Great Navigators" – 4:28
7. "Busy Little Bee" – 2:59
8. "Reckoning" – 2:52
9. "You Can Never Tell" – 2:28
10. "The Misfit" – 3:16
11. "Thank Your Parents" – 7:00

== Personnel ==
Oneida

- Hanoi Jane (Francis McDermott) – guitar, bass
- Bobby Matador (Robertson Thacher) – organ, guitar, bass, vocals
- Kid Millions (John Colpitts) – drums, vocals

Additional musicians

- Barry London
- Phil Manley
- Erica Fletcher
- Emily Manzo
- Brad Truax
- Busy Gangnes
- Shahin Motia
- Stephanie Rabins
- Fred Wallace

Technical

- Barry London – recording engineer, mixing
- Nocolas Vernhes – recording engineer, mixing
