= Alone at the Microphone =

Studio album by Royal City
- Released: 2001
- Genre: Alternative rock
- Length: 39:04
- Label: Three Gut Records/ Rough Trade Records

Royal City chronology
At Rush Hour the Cars (2000)	Alone at the Microphone (2001)	Little Heart's Ease (2004)

Professional ratings
Review scores
Source	Rating
AllMusic	4/5 stars
Pitchfork Media	8.4/10

Alone at the Microphone is Royal City's second album.

== Track listing ==
1. "Bad Luck" – 3:27
2. "Under a Hallow Tree" – 1:49
3. "My Brother is the Meatman" – 3:08
4. "Spacy Basement" - 4:35
5. "Dank Is the Air of Death and Loathing" – 3:28
6. "Don't You" – 3:33
7. "You Are the Vine" – 4:00
8. "Daisies" – 2:56
9. "Blood and Faeces" – 2:34
10. "Rum Tobacco" – 5:59
11. "And Miriam Took a Timbrel in Her Hand" – 3:37
