= Human Highway (band) =

Canadian indie rock band

- Origin: Toronto, Ontario, Canada
- Genre: Indie rock
- Years active: 2008–present
- Labels: Secret City, Suicide Squeeze
- Members: Jim Guthrie; Nicholas Thorburn; Evan Gordon; Geordie Gordon; Aaron Harris
- Website: www.myspace.com/humanhighway

Human Highway is a Canadian indie rock band from Toronto, Ontario. It is composed of singer-songwriter Jim Guthrie and Nicholas Thorburn of the band Islands. Their style is influenced by 1960s and 1970s AM radio pop music.

== History ==
The band started in the early 2000s; the pair had previously worked together in the band Islands, and Thorburn asked Guthrie for help with a song called "My Beach". The band's name is a reference to the Neil Young song "Human Highway".

The duo's debut album, Moody Motorcycle, was released in August 2008 on Secret City Records in Canada and Suicide Squeeze Records in the United States. Islands members Evan Gordon, Geordie Gordon, and Aaron Harris were recruited to fill out the band. Reviews of the album were fairly positive.

Up to that time Human Highway was strictly a recording project; the band began playing live support of the album, performing in New York as well as four live shows in Ontario and Quebec and took part in Canada Music Week in March. They released a video to accompany their song "The Sound" before going on tour.

== See also ==
- Music of Canada
- Canadian rock
- List of Canadian musicians
- List of bands from Canada
- Category:Canadian musical groups
