= Superbrothers: Sword & Sworcery EP =

2011 video game

- Developers: Capybara Games; Superbrothers
- Publisher: Capybara Games
- Composer: Jim Guthrie
- Platforms: iOS, Microsoft Windows, Mac OS X, Linux, Android, Nintendo Switch
- Release: iPad; March 24, 2011 iPhone; April 27, 2011; Microsoft Windows; April 16, 2012; Mac OS X, Linux; May 31, 2012; Android; November 2012; Nintendo Switch; November 30, 2018
- Genres: Art game, action-adventure
- Mode: Single-player

Superbrothers: Sword & Sworcery EP is an adventure and indie game created by Superbrothers and Capybara Games, with music by Jim Guthrie. It was initially released for iOS devices, with a version for Microsoft Windows via Steam coming later. Mac OS X and Linux ports were included with the release of Humble Indie Bundle V, while a port to the Android platform was released as part of the fourth Humble Bundle for Android. Additionally, a port to Nintendo Switch was released, combining both mobile and computer-like control schemes, as well as adding controller support. The iOS and Android versions make use of device orientation during gameplay.

== Gameplay ==
The player taps where they want the character, a Scythian warrior, to go. The accelerometer is incorporated into the gameplay, with the user turning the device 90 degrees to make the Scythian take out her sword (the PC version uses the right mouse button). The player taps the shield button or the sword button to use them. If the Scythian is harmed during a conflict, the player can heal by finding and consuming small, red mushrooms. Eating these mushrooms also activates a special musical track, only played in such an event.

Most of the dialogue is done through thoughts, once the user has acquired the "Megatome", a magic book that lets the character read people's minds. The character can jump between two worlds; the "real" world and the "dream" world. The user jumps from one world to the other by letting the Scythian sleep, which is done through making them sit down at a specific place in the game.

Touching and holding on the Scythian will initiate a "song of sworcery", a mechanic that allows the player to telepathically interact with the environment. This is usually used to solve environmental puzzles which summon sprites. The sprites are needed to obtain trigons.

Certain events and passages of play, including discovering some sprites, may only happen if the moon is in a certain phase. The moon phase in the real world is synchronised with the game world based on the system clock. However, moon phases can also be skipped by visiting the "moon grotto". This is a hidden cave that is unlocked late in the game. Entering this cave will also play a unique musical track that can not be found on the official soundtrack.

== Plot ==
The Scythian crosses the bridge into Mingi Taw. Logfella and Dogfella wait underneath the stone arch.

In the game, there are 4 "sessions". In Session I, The Scythian travels through the countryside near the Caucasus Mountains on a quest. She meets a black-haired girl, colloquially called Girl (Samae in the Switch version), tending to some sheep in a meadow near the start of her journey. Eventually she comes upon a man cutting wood named Logfella, and a dog named Dogfella. Logfella reluctantly agrees to lead them to the mountain Mingi Taw. The path ends at a canyon, on the other side of which is a massive face carved into the mountain, the mouth being an entrance to a cave.

The Scythian raises her sword under a rainbow near the canyon and a "tongue" extends from the mouth. The Scythian crosses into Mingi Taw alone. The Scythian arrives at her goal deep under the mountain: a book of powerful "sworcery" known as the Megatome. The Scythian's sword reacts to the presence of the Megatome, and she uses it to cut the book free from the skeletal hands that hold it in place. Suddenly, the hands and an antlered skull hovering above it come alive and chase the Scythian through the caves of Mingi Taw. The Scythian escapes, but the eyes and mouth of the face on Mingi Taw close and exude black smoke, and a thunderstorm begins overhead. A wolf-like creature with three eyes pursues the Scythian, the dog, and Logfella as they make their way to Logfella's cabin. The first "session" ends with the Scythian triumphant having obtained the Megatome.

Afterwards, the player is presented with the second session by "The Archetype". He monitors the Scythian's progress throughout the story, calling her journey a series of tests, or sessions. Shortly thereafter, the player returns to the Scythian, teleporting to a platform east of Logfella's cabin. The Scythian makes it back to Logfella's cabin, where Girl suggests awakening several nearby sylvan sprites – mystical creatures that grant miracles to those who summon them – to break up the thunderstorm. She reminds the Scythian that these sprites emit bubbles (which could be interpreted as a scent) and a specific sound whenever they are around. The Scythian travels the countryside, locating the three sylvan sprites and breaking up the thunderstorm. To reach the third sylvan sprite, the Scythian traverses to the side of Mingi Taw, but the door to the path leading there is locked. Logfella, who holds the key, tells the Scythian that he lost it while dreaming. He explains that by sitting near the hearth of the fire inside the cabin one enters a dream space.

Inside the dream, the Scythian watches a Boor who's dancing about. Approaching it, the Boor begins to run away. Following it, she reaches the side of a lake, where Logfella's key is. With it, she travels to the side of Mingi Taw to awaken the third sylvan sprite and break up the storm. When all the sylvan sprites are awakened, Girl and Logfella see this event as a "time of miracles", as told in tales between folks of the Caucasus. Once the storm has passed, a mysterious light emanates at a maze-like structure in the meadow near Logfella's cabin. After chanting a song of sworcery, a geometric figure appears. This geometric figure, an upside-down triangle, is recognized in the Megatome to be the "Golden Trigon", a piece of the Trigon Trifecta. Approaching the Golden Trigon, the Scythian readies her sword and shield as it begins to attack. The Trigon's attacks begin with a projectile-like beam before progressing to lasers being shot out of an eye-like figure which the Trigon assumes, all of which follow the pattern of the song being played during the battle. After defeating the Golden Trigon, the Scythian stores it in the Megatome, and the session ends.

In the third session, the Scythian searches the dreams of Girl and Logfella and finds the remaining two Trigons. Each of those Trigons can only be obtained during a certain moon phase. The Scythian then attends a rock concert, with the musician Jim Guthrie, where she reassembles the Trigon Trifecta.

The Archetype introduces the player to the final session, explaining that completing the Scythian's woeful errand will be fatal. The Scythian uses the Trigon Trifecta to teleport to Mingi Taw to vanquish the antlered being (referred to as the Gogolithic Mass). After a final showdown with the three-eyed wolf, the Scythian detonates the Trigon Trifecta and the Megatome at the summit of Mingi Taw, sacrificing herself and vaporizing the Gogolithic Mass. Logfella and Girl somberly cremate the Scythian's body.

== Development ==
A trailer was released for the game in February 2011, and the iPad version was released on March 24, 2011. Superbrothers: Sword & Sworcery EP won the Independent Games Festival Mobile Achievement in Art award in 2010. The developers initially stated that they had no intention of creating an Android version of the game. However, on November 8, 2012 it was announced that Sword & Sworcery will come to Android initially through the release of a beta version within the Humble Bundle for Android 4 package. It later was widely released on Google Play on December 21, 2012. On November 30, 2018, a port of the game was released on Nintendo Switch via the Nintendo eShop.

== Reception ==
Reception

Aggregate score
Aggregator	Score
Metacritic	iOS: 86/100; PC: 83/100; NS: 79/100

Review score
Publication	Score
TouchArcade	iOS: 5/5

The game has sold over 1.5 million copies. Superbrothers: Sword and Sworcery EP won the Visuals award at IndieCade 2011. It was also featured as a free download on the 5th Anniversary of Apple's Appstore. Pocket Gamer awarded it both Most Innovative Game and iPad Game of the Year in 2012

In a review of Superbrothers: Sword & Sworcery EP in Black Gate, John ONeill said "On the surface Sword & Sworcery looks like a point-and-click adventure game, circa 1995. But the artistic design and innovative touches make this unlike any game you've ever seen."
