= At Rush Hour the Cars =

Studio album by Royal City
- Released: 2000
- Genre: Indie rock
- Label: Three Gut Records

Royal City chronology
At Rush Hour the Cars (2000)	Alone at the Microphone (2001)

Professional ratings
Review scores
Source	Rating
AllMusic	3/5 stars

At Rush Hour the Cars is the debut album by Canadian indie rock band Royal City, released in 2000 on Three Gut Records.

== Track listing ==
1. "O You With Flowers" – 3:20
2. "At Rush Hour the Cars" – 5:00
3. "I'm Taking the Train" – 2:10
4. "You Strutted and Fretted Across" – 3:23
5. "I Am a Raw Youth" – 2:29
6. "The Sound of the Streetcars" – 4:24
7. "Baby Let Your Heart Out" – 2:57
8. "Rosy My Cheek" – 4:19
9. "I Can See" – 1:29
10. "In Havana the Stars" – 1:37
11. "I Want to Go Everywhere" – 2:02
12. "Codeine & Shakespeare" – 2:53
13. "I'd Never Be Anything" – 4:51
