= The Unintended =

- Origin: Toronto, Ontario, Canada
- Genre: Indie rock
- Years active: 2004–present
- Labels: Blue Fog Recordings, Sonic Unyon
- Spinoff of: The Sadies
- Members: Rick White; Travis Good; Sean Dean; Mike Belitsky; Greg Keelor
- Past members: Dallas Good

The Unintended is a Canadian indie supergroup, consisting of Dallas Good (died 2022), Travis Good, Sean Dean and Mike Belitsky of The Sadies, Greg Keelor of Blue Rodeo and Rick White of Eric's Trip and Elevator. The band's name comes from a lyric in Gordon Lightfoot's "Go-Go Round." Their music was laid-back psychedelic rock with some folky aspects.

== History ==
The Unintended formed in 2004. That year the band released an album, The Unintended, which was recorded by Ian Osborn on Keelor's farm. It was mastered by Osborn at the Peterborough Arts Umbrella.

In 2006, they released four Gordon Lightfoot covers on the split album Constantines Play Young/Unintended Play Lightfoot.

They did not release any further recordings as The Unintended. However, after Dallas Good's death in 2022, The Sadies released a 2024 album with White on lead vocals, which Vish Khanna of Exclaim! characterized as being in some ways a continuation of The Unintended.

== Discography ==
- 2004: The Unintended (Blue Fog/Sonic Unyon)
- 2006: Constantines Play Young/Unintended Play Lightfoot (Blue Fog)
