= Jim Guthrie (Canadian musician) =

Canadian singer-songwriter

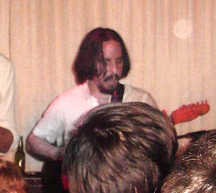
- Guthrie playing with Islands in 2006

Background information
- Born: Guelph, Ontario, Canada
- Genres: Indie rock, experimental
- Years active: 1995–present
- Labels: 3 Syllables, Three Gut
- Website: jimguthrie.org

Jim Guthrie is a Canadian singer-songwriter. He has recorded both as a solo artist and as a member of the bands Islands, Royal City and Human Highway. He has also composed music for TV ads and video games, and has scored multiple films including Indie Game: The Movie, A Short History of the Highrise, and The Bodybuilder and I.

== History ==
He was born and raised in Guelph, Ontario, and currently lives in Toronto.

Guthrie first made a name for himself by releasing a series of self-produced cassettes, and subsequently released albums on Three Gut Records. He was nominated for a Juno Award for 2003 album Now, More Than Ever. In June 2013, his solo studio album Takes Time was longlisted for the 2013 Polaris Music Prize. The name of the album is a nod to the delay of the album's completion and release, which he began recording in 2007. He performed at NPR Music as part of their Tiny Desk Concerts series in support of the album's release.

During the ten years between solo albums Guthrie worked as a composer, scoring music for television ads, films and video games, in addition to his work on the side project Human Highway with Nick Thorburn of Islands. He received acclaim for the music he composed for the 2011 computer and tablet video game, Superbrothers: Sword & Sworcery EP. The score was published as a digital and analogue (vinyl) album, Sword & Sworcery LP: The Ballad of the Space Babies, in April 2011. His work on the project drew the attention of filmmakers James Swirsky and Lisanne Pajot, who asked Guthrie to score their documentary Indie Game: The Movie, using tracks from the album, as well as new original tracks. Guthrie's music has also appeared in several commercials including ads for the ALS Society of Canada and Capital One. On April 15, 2015, a book titled Jim Guthrie: Who Needs What was released.

=== Other projects ===
Jim Guthrie Vs. The Haymakers was a limited release split EP released in 2003, featuring four songs by each artist. Jim Guthrie contributed four instrumentals, created using the Sony PlayStation MTV Music Generator, while Haymakers contributed three songs which would eventually be released on their album II, and one song ("Gravy") which was exclusive to the Jim Guthrie Vs. The Haymakers release.

His song "Who Needs What", from the 1999 album A Thousand Songs, was covered by the indie pop band Tullycraft on their 2002 album Beat, Surf, Fun.

Since the 1990s he has collaborated with Guelph-based hip-hop artist Noah23 on numerous projects, including an appearance on his 2008 album Rock Paper Scissors.

In 2011, Guthrie collaborated with Sarah Harmer and Bry Webb for the National Parks Project.

In 2013, Guthrie began selling guitar tabs for his songs through the indie tab site Soundslice.

In 2014, it was announced that Guthrie would be contributing music to the Harmonix reboot of Amplitude.

Planet Coaster's soundtrack, composed by Guthrie and JJ Ipsen, was released simultaneously with the game in November 2016.

In 2019, the Klei game Griftlands was released with a soundtrack of Guthrie.

In 2023, the game Overmorrow was released with a soundtrack by Guthrie.

== Discography ==
=== Solo ===
- Home is Where the Rock Is (1995)
- Victim of Lo-Fi (1996)
- Documenting Perks Part 1 (1997)
- Some Things You Should Know About Sound and Hearing (1998)
- A Thousand Songs (1999)
- Population Me (2001)
- Morning Noon Night (2002)
- Now, More Than Ever (2003)
- Jim Guthrie Vs. Haymakers (2003)
- Now, More Than Ever (Extended Edition) (2010)
- Sword & Sworcery LP: The Ballad of the Space Babies (2011)
- Children of the Clone (2011)
- Indie Game: The Movie (Soundtrack) (2012)
- Takes Time (2013)
- Below (Original Soundtrack) (2018)
- Bleak Sword (Original Score) (2019)
- Nobody Saves the World (Original Soundtrack) (2022)
- Blighted (2026)

=== In Human Highway ===
- Moody Motorcycle (2008)

=== In Royal City ===
- At Rush Hour the Cars (2000)
- Alone at the Microphone (2001)
- Little Heart's Ease (2004)
- Royal City (2009)

=== With Islands ===
- Return to the Sea (2006)

=== With Solid Mas ===
- One Of These Days I'll Get It Right (2014)

=== With JJ Ipsen ===
- You, Me & Gravity: The Music of Planet Coaster (2016)
- Weightless: The Ambient Music of Planet Coaster (2017)
- Reigns: Her Majesty (Original Soundtrack) (2017)
