= Little Heart's Ease (album) =

Studio album by Royal City
- Released: June 8, 2004
- Genre: Alternative rock
- Length: 43:56
- Labels: Three Gut/ Rough Trade

Royal City chronology
Alone at the Microphone (2001)	Little Heart's Ease (2004)	Royal City (2009)

Professional ratings
Review scores
Source	Rating
AllMusic	3.5/5 stars

Little Heart's Ease is Royal City's third and final album.

== Track listing ==
1. "Bring My Father a Gift" – 3:02
2. "Jerusalem" – 3:48
3. "She Will Come" – 2:37
4. "Count the Days" – 3:36
5. "Can't You" – 4:09
6. "Cabbage Rolls" – 2:53
7. "My Body Is Numbered" – 5:10
8. "O Beauty" - 3:45
9. "Ain't That the Way" – 2:53
10. "That My Head Were a Spring of Water" – 2:12
11. "Enemy" – 5:32
12. "Take Me Down to Yonder River" – 4:18
