= Constantines =

Canadian indie rock band

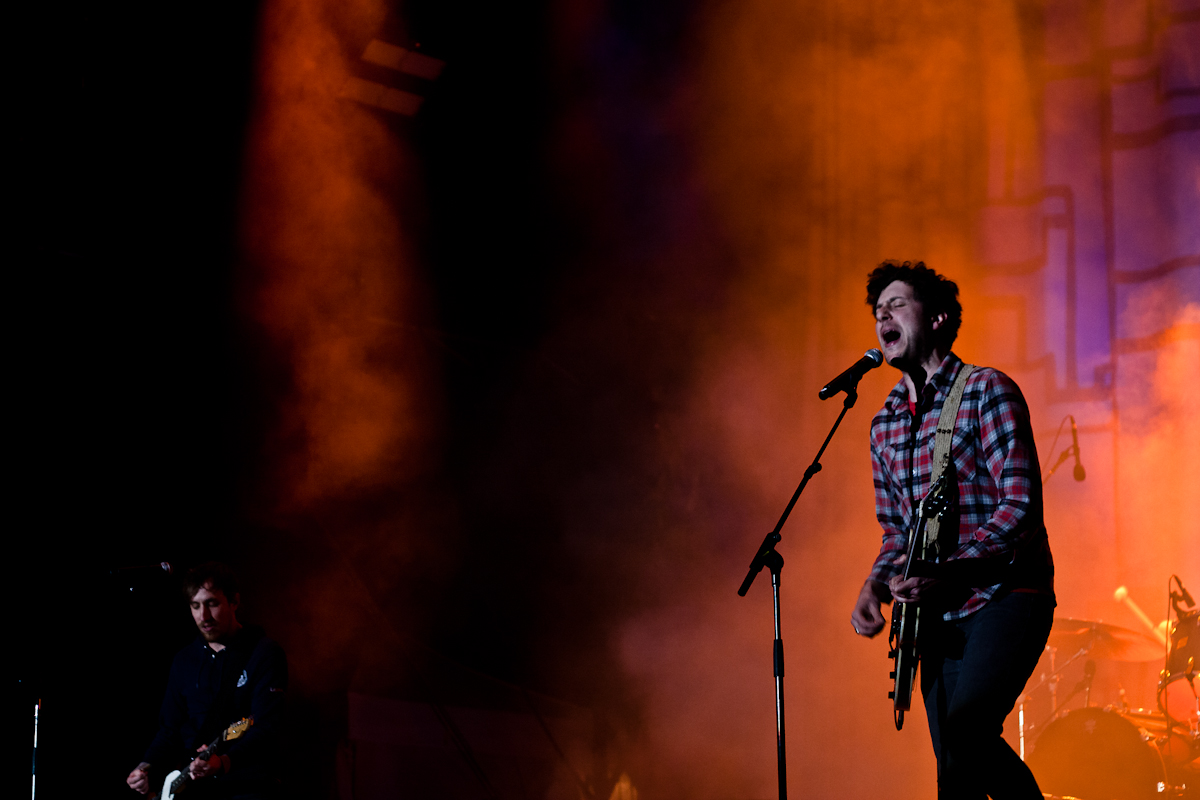
- Constantines playing the Vancouver 2010 Olympics

Background information
- Also known as: Horsey Craze
- Origin: Guelph, Ontario, Canada
- Genre: Indie rock
- Years active: 1999–2010, 2014–present
- Labels: Three Gut, Arts & Crafts, Sub Pop
- Spinoff of: Shoulder
- Members: Will Kidman; Steve Lambke; Doug MacGregor; Bryan Webb; Dallas Wehrle
- Past members: Evan Gordon
- Website: arts-crafts.ca/artists/constantines.html

Constantines is an indie rock band from Guelph, Ontario, Canada.

== History ==
Constantines was formed in 1999, by vocalist and guitarist Bryan Webb, drummer Doug MacGregor, and guitarist Paul Bright, all of whom had played together in the emo band Shoulder from 1994 to 1997; with the addition of bassist Dallas Wehrle. Bright was asked to leave early on and was replaced by Steve Lambke. Their style has been described as "art-punk", and they have been compared to bands like The Clash, Fugazi, Bruce Springsteen, The Replacements, and Nick Cave.

The name of the band is taken from an episode of Coast to Coast with Art Bell, in which Bell was playing recordings of ghost voices in static, and one of the ghosts' names was Constantine.

From their hometown of Guelph the band relocated to London, Ontario, and then to Toronto, where in 2001 they released their self-titled first album. Constantines enjoyed widespread play on campus radio and was nominated for a Juno Award for Best Alternative Album. The first track, "Arizona", is based on the suicide of Danny Rapp, the lead singer of Danny and the Juniors of "At the Hop" fame. The song begins with the lyric "This is a song about the death of Danny Rapp. And that great gospel jest called rock 'n' roll." That year they performed at the El Mocambo in Toronto with Oneida and Grand Total.

In 2002, they added keyboard player Evan Gordon to the lineup and released the EP The Modern Sinner Nervous Man. Gordon left the band soon after to pursue his own song writing. He was replaced by Will Kidman, and the band released Shine a Light in 2003. This album was the band's first to be released outside of Canada on the Sub Pop record label. It topped the !earshot National Top 50 chart in September that year. Shine a Light also earned the band their second Juno Award nomination for Alternative Album of the Year.

In 2004, the label Sub Pop reissued the band's self-titled album. The next year, they embarked on a cross-Canada tour with The Weakerthans called The Rolling Tundra Revue. The following year, their album Tournament of Hearts was released on September 27 by Toronto record label Three Gut Records in Canada, and on October 11 by Sub Pop in the United States.

The members of Constantines have occasionally played shows under the name Horsey Craze, covering Neil Young songs. In early 2006, they released a vinyl only split-album with The Unintended. Constantines recorded four Neil Young covers for the LP, while The Unintended performed four Gordon Lightfoot songs.

In 2007, following the demise of their Canadian former record label Three Gut Records, Constantines signed with Arts & Crafts. On January 15, 2008, they released a limited edition 7" on white vinyl, entitled Hard Feelings. Their fourth full-length album, Kensington Heights, was released on April 15 in Canada and April 29 in the US. The band played SP20 that summer, a festival in Redmond, Washington, celebrating the 20th anniversary of Sub Pop Records.

Guitarist Steve Lambke has released four albums and a split 12" under the name Baby Eagle, and keyboard player Will Kidman has appeared and recorded under the name Woolly Leaves.

In December 2009, the band celebrated their tenth anniversary with a tour of southwestern Ontario. Shortly thereafter, keyboardist Will Kidman left the band. This, coupled with Webb's move from his home in Montreal back to Guelph, fueled rumours of the band's demise. Although Webb hinted that the band might return.

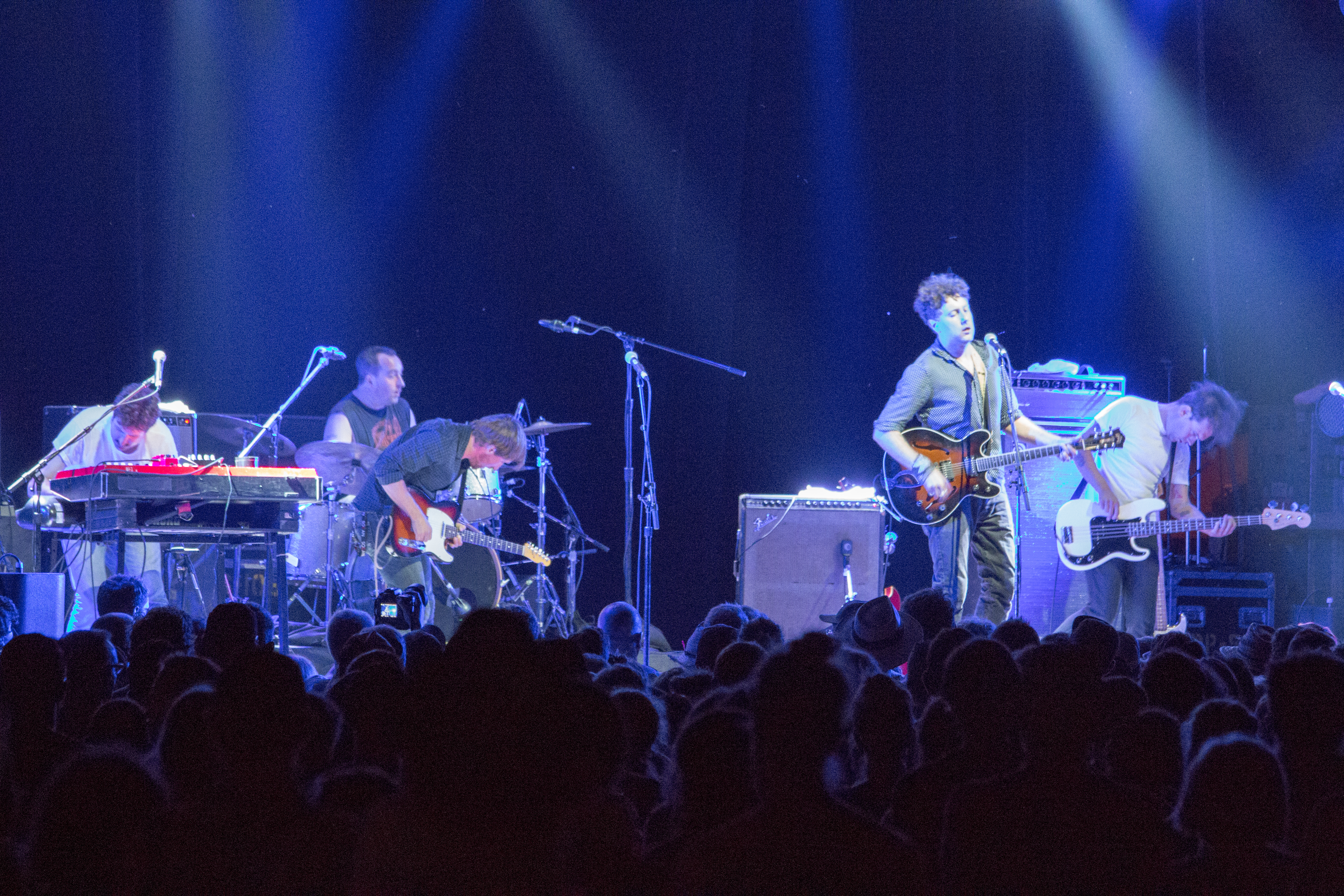
The Constantines performing at the 2015 Hillside Festival in Guelph, Ontario

Constantines went on an unofficial hiatus for several years.

In 2014, Constantines reformed for a reunion tour, performing at festivals around Canada, including SappyFest and at Kazoo!Fest in Guelph. In May 2015, the band performed at Massey Hall in Toronto with Chad VanGaalen

Constantines were on the line-up for Wayhome summer 2017 music festival in Oro-Medonte, Ontario, and once more performed at Kazoo!Fest.

In 2020, Constantines digitally self-released charity single "Call Me Out" written in 2017 and recorded in 2018. The song was not published on streaming platforms and instead was only made available as a purchasable Bandcamp download with 100% of its proceeds being donated to Black Lives Matter Toronto and the Unistʼotʼen Camp Legal Fund.

== Members ==
=== Current members ===
- Will Kidman – keyboards, guitar, percussion, backing vocals
- Steve Lambke – guitar, keyboards, vocals
- Doug MacGregor – drums
- Bryan Webb – vocals, guitar
- Dallas Wehrle – bass guitar, backing vocals

=== Former members ===
- Evan Gordon – keyboards

== Discography ==
=== Albums ===
- Constantines (Three Gut Records) – June 5, 2001 (Sub Pop Records - August 10, 2004)
- Shine a Light (Three Gut Records/Sub Pop Records) – August 19, 2003
- Tournament of Hearts (Three Gut Records) – September 27, 2005 / (Sub Pop Records) - October 11, 2005
- Kensington Heights (Arts & Crafts) – April 15, 2008

=== EPs ===
- The Modern Sinner Nervous Man (EP, Suicide Squeeze Records) – April 16, 2002
- Nighttime Anytime (EP, Sub Pop) – July 8, 2003

=== Singles ===
- Young Lions (single, Sub Pop) – August 10, 2004
- Hard Feelings (7" single, Arts & Crafts) – January 15, 2008
- Islands in the Stream (7" single with Feist, Arts & Crafts) – 2008
- Our Age (7" single, Arts & Crafts, B-side is cover of "Fuckin' Up" by Neil Young and Crazy Horse) – November 25, 2008
- Too Slow for Love (Electronic-only companion for Kensington Heights) – March 17, 2009
- Thank You For Sending me An Angel (7" included in vinyl reissue of Shine A Light ) 2014
- Call Me Out (digital, self-released) - June 9, 2020

=== Splits ===
- Constantines Play Young/Unintended Play Lightfoot LP (Blue Fog Records) – 2006

=== Compilation appearances ===
- The 20 Year Design Theory (AntiAntenna Recordings) – "The Young and the Desperate" – June 1, 2001
- Patient Zero – "Young Lions" (Sub Pop) – June 1, 2004
- CBC Radio 3 Sessions, Vol. 1 – "Blind Luck (live)" – June 15, 2004
- Wide Awake, Crescent Shaped: Volume 10 – "St. You (live)" – June 15, 2004
- Songbook Of Songs (Sub Pop) – "Working Full-Time" – May 24, 2005

=== TV appearances ===
- Beautiful Noise

== See also ==
- Music of Canada
- Canadian rock
- List of bands from Canada
- List of Canadian musicians
- Category:Canadian musical groups
