= Ski Mask (album) =

Studio album by Islands
- Released: September 17, 2013
- Genre: Rock
- Length: 40:50
- Label: Manqué Music
- Producer: Nick Diamonds; Evan Gordon

Islands chronology
A Sleep & a Forgetting (2012)	Ski Mask (2013)	Should I Remain Here, At Sea? (2016)

Ski Mask is the fifth studio album by Canadian indie rock band Islands. It was released on September 17, 2013 via Manqué Music. Production was handled by members Nick "Diamonds" Thorburn and Evan Gordon. The album peaked at number 48 on the Heatseekers Albums chart in the United States.

== Critical reception ==
Professional ratings
Aggregate scores
Source	Rating
AnyDecentMusic?	6.2/10
Metacritic	70/100
Review scores
Source	Rating
AllMusic	3.5/5 stars
Consequence of Sound	C+
Drowned in Sound	6/10
NME	4/5 stars
Paste	7/10
Pitchfork	6.4/10
PopMatters	6/10
Slant	3/5 stars
The Skinny	2/5 stars

Ski Mask was met with generally favorable reviews from music critics. At Metacritic, which assigns a normalized rating out of 100 to reviews from mainstream publications, the album received an average score of 70 based on twelve reviews. The aggregator AnyDecentMusic? has the critical consensus of the album at a 6.2 out of 10, based on ten reviews.

Mark Beaumont of NME praised the album, suggesting to "get marooned with them, while you still can". AllMusic's Tim Sendra wrote: "fans of early Islands albums may feel Ski Mask to be a little on the morose side, but anyone who's ever had a heartbreak can appreciate what Thorburn is going through and admire how tunefully and truthfully he's dealing with it". Adam Kivel of Consequence declared: "rather than chase his early highs, Ski Mask is the latest issuance of a unique voice continuing to explore his particularities and place them in new contexts". Carey Hodges of Paste stated: "here, harmonies, bouncy synths and cheeky metaphors abound, and, besides a few clunky miscalculations, the record is an undeniably fun listen". Devon Maloney of Pitchfork concluded: "it's all pleasant, but when it's over, the only truly memorable song is 'Wave Forms'".

In mixed reviews, Andrzej Lukowski of Drowned in Sound stated: "there's much to admire here, but when you've stared into the sun for too long, it's hard to see the dimmer lights". John Bergstrom of PopMatters called it "a solid Islands album, but it lacks the thematic and musical cohesion of Thorburn's best work". Annie Galvin of Slant wrote: "perhaps Ski Mask's greatest virtue is that it demonstrates Islands' competency as a conventional rock act while dropping the occasional winking reminder that the band hasn't lost their ability to get weird". Finbarr Bermingham of The Skinny noted: "too much of the record is MOR fodder laden with forgettable melodies and banal arrangements".

== Track listing ==
All tracks are written by Nicholas Thorburn.

No.	Title	Length
1.	"Wave Forms"	2:53
2.	"Death Drive"	2:50
3.	"Becoming the Gunship"	3:51
4.	"Nil"	2:07
5.	"Sad Middle"	3:05
6.	"Hushed Tones"	5:17
7.	"Here Here"	4:19
8.	"Shotgun Vision"	3:08
9.	"Of Corpse"	4:16
10.	"We'll Do It So You Don't Have To"	4:15
11.	"Winged Beat Drums"	4:49
Total length:		40:50

== Personnel ==
- Nicholas "Nick Diamonds" Thorburn – lyrics, arranger, producer, design, layout
- Evan Gordon – arranger, producer
- Geordie Gordon – arranger, photography
- Luc Laurent – arranger
- Celso Estrada – engineering
- Brian Rosemeyer – additional engineering
- Chris Shaw – mixing
- Mark Chalecki – mastering
- Jan Lankisch – cover art
- Matthew Devlen – cover art
- Todd Weaver – photography
- Jason Ruiz – illustration
- Jimmy Fleming – layout
