= Green Go =

- Origin: Guelph, Ontario, Canada
- Genre: Indie rock
- Years active: 2006-present
- Label: Pheromone Recordings
- Members: Ferenc(Fezz) Stenton (vocals/synth/bass); Jessica Tollefsen (vocals/synth); Kyle Squance (bass/guitar); Mark Andrade (vocals/guitar/bass/synth/aux drums); Adam Scott (drums)
- Website: www.greengomusic.com

Green Go are a Canadian indie rock band formed in 2006 from Guelph, Ontario, Canada. The band is known for their live performances, with a fast-paced dance party atmosphere.

== Members ==
The band consists of Ferenc (Fezz) Stenton (vocals/synth/bass), Jessica Tollefsen (vocals/synth), Kyle Squance (vocals/bass/guitar), Mark Andrade (vocals/guitar/bass/synth/aux drums) and Adam Scott (drums).

Go Green formed when Stenton returned from living as an exchange student in Brazil. In 2006, while looking for musicians to start a project, he met Tollefsen while she was playing with Spy Machine 16, and the two began writing music while attending the University of Guelph. Squance, also from Spy Machine 16 and Andrade quickly joined the band and a first gig was booked at the Albion Hotel almost right away. Later that year after Andrade sustained a drumming injury, Scott was asked to join to take over drums, leaving Andrade to explore other instruments.

Green Go gained notoriety by playing intense house parties in Guelph, Ontario. Guelph is known for a vibrant music scene, with bands like Green Go being formed during a noticeable wave of independent live music in that city in the mid-2000s.

The band was a part of the Burnt Oak Collective of Guelph artists which included notable Guelph area musicians such as Slow Hand Motëm, Richard Laviolette, Jia Qing Wilson-Yang, and Elbow Beach Surf Club. The rich Guelph music scene at the time also gave rise to prominent local bands The D'Urbervilles and The Magic.

They play energetic dance music that includes a complex mash-up of elements from rock, punk, electro, no wave, and funk. Their music is performed entirely with live instruments, without a laptop or electronic click-track.

After releasing their home recorded debut self-titled EP on Burnt Oak, Green Go began touring central Canada extensively and recording their first full-length album, Borders, which was released in April 2009.

Green Go have played shows with Shout Out Out Out Out, You Say Party! We Say Die!, Holy Fuck, Woodhands, Natalie Portman's Shaved Head, Think About Life, Arkells, Fischerspooner, Beast, Ruby Jean and the Thoughtful Bees, and Thunderheist, among others. They have played at numerous festivals including Pop Montreal, NXNE, Hillside, Festival d'ete Quebec, and Osheaga.

In addition to their own recordings, the band has also released two EPs featuring remixes of songs by other Canadian indie rock artists, including Diamond Rings, The D'Urbervilles, The Rural Alberta Advantage, Gentleman Reg, Women, and Born Ruffians.

== Popular culture references ==
- Their song "You Know You Want It" was featured on NBC's Chuck in March 2010, episode 3:10, "Chuck VS. the Tic Tac".

== Discography ==
=== Albums ===
- Green Go - Independent (2006)
- Borders - Pheromone Recordings (2009)

== See also ==
- Music of Canada
- Canadian rock
- List of Canadian musicians
- List of bands from Canada
- Category:Canadian musical groups
