= Lennon or McCartney =

2014 Canadian documentary film

- Directed by: Matt Schichter
- Production company: Scared Goose Productions
- Release date: December 12, 2014
- Running time: 34 minutes
- Country: Canada
- Language: English

Lennon or McCartney is a 2014 Canadian documentary short film directed by Matt Schichter. The film is a compilation of 550 celebrities' responses, taken from interviews throughout the decade, to the question of which of the two former Beatles is superior: John Lennon or Paul McCartney.

Among the celebrities included in the film are the Arctic Monkeys, Benedict Cumberbatch, Bridgit Mendler, Carly Rae Jepsen, Justin Bieber, Metallica, Miss Piggy, Morgan Freeman, Sylvester Stallone, Steve-O, and Tommy Chong. Of the responses, 282 answered "John Lennon", 196 answered "Paul McCartney", 15 answered "George Harrison", four answered "Ringo Starr", one answered "Jimi Hendrix", one answered "Lou Reed", one answered "Keith Richards", one answered "Oasis", and 50 did not answer.

Schichter stated at the time of its release that "I had all the video footage from the interviews, but never thought about compiling it all until last month ... I just went for it, hoping people would dig it."

== Cast ==
In alphabetical order:

- Aaron Eckhart
- Aaron Paul
- Aasif Mandvi
- Adam Lambert
- Adam Levine and James Valentine of Maroon 5
- Tom Hamilton of Aerosmith
- Laura Jane Grace of Against Me
- Mikel Jollett of The Airborne Toxic Event
- Alan Tudyk
- Alana de la Garza
- Alanis Morissette
- Alex Borstein
- Alice Eve, Karl Urban and John Cho
- Tyson Ritter and Nick Wheeler of The All-American Rejects
- Zachary Porter, Cameron Quiseng and Michael Allen Martinez of Allstar Weekend
- Alison Brie and Danny Pudi
- Alyssa Reid
- Amanda Palmer
- Anna Gunn
- Angelique Kidjo
- Angus Wilson
- Alex Turner and Matt Helders of Arctic Monkeys
- Max Kerman and Mike DeAngelis of Arkells
- Tim Wheeler of Ash
- Atom Egoyan
- Aubrey Plaza
- Dan Layus of Augustana
- Mike Robins and Tareya Green of Autumn Hill
- Freddie Mojallal of The Ausumn Portrait
- Scott Avett of The Avett Brothers
- Aaron Bruno of Awolnation
- Robbie Robertson of The Band
- Kimberly Perry, Reid Perry, and Neil Perry of The Band Perry
- Steven Page of Barenaked Ladies
- Barry Pepper
- Basia Bulat
- Dan Smith, Kyle Simmons, Will Farquarson, and Chris Wood of Bastille
- Baz Luhrmann
- Beau Willimon
- Ben E. King
- Ben Howard
- Ben Lee
- Ben Taylor
- Benedict Cumberbatch
- Bethany Cosentino of Best Coast
- Beth Orton
- James Johnston of Biffy Clyro
- Big Sean
- Gordie Johnson of Big Sugar and Grady
- Ian Thornley of Big Wreck and Thornley
- Ben Kowalewicz and Aaron Solowoniuk of Billy Talent
- Ozzy Osbourne and Geezer Butler of Black Sabbath
- Blake Sennett of Rilo Kiley and The Elected
- Greg Keelor and Jim Cuddy of Blue Rodeo
- Bo Diddley
- Jaret Reddick and Chris Burney of Bowling for Soup
- Brad Furman
- Bradley Cooper, Ed Helms, and Zach Galifianakis
- Brendan Canning of Broken Social Scene
- Brett Dennen
- Brett Kissel
- Bret McKenzie
- Bridgit Mendler
- Buck 65
- Josh Todd of Buckcherry
- Butch Walker
- Cadence Weapon
- Brad Schultz of Cage the Elephant
- Caitlin Gerard
- John McCrea of Cake
- Carly Rae Jepsen
- Carrie Underwood
- Casey Wilson
- Cassadee Pope
- Charli XCX
- Donald Glover
- Chloe Bennet
- Chris Jericho
- Chris Pine and Zachary Quinto
- Cillian Murphy and Rodrigo Cortés
- Dallas Green of City & Colour and Alexisonfire
- Classified
- Cobie Smulders and Mark Ruffalo
- Beatrice Martin of Coeur de Pirate
- Adam Duritz of Counting Crows
- Courtney Solomon
- Ian Astbury of The Cult
- Scott Stanton, Dave Lang, Ghosty Boy, and Chris Petersen of Current Swell
- Dan Mangan
- Daniel Wesley
- Danielle Panabaker and Candice Patton
- Danny Boyle
- Darius Rucker of Hootie & the Blowfish
- Justin Hawkins of The Darkness
- David Alan Grier
- David Byrne of Talking Heads
- David Dobkin and Susan Downey
- David Morrissey
- Dr. David Suzuki
- Taylor Goldsmith and Griffin Goldsmith of Dawes
- Dax Shepard
- Chris Walla and Jason McGerr of Death Cab for Cutie
- Devin Kelley
- Martie Maguire and Emily Robison of The Dixie Chicks
- David Draiman and Dan Donegan of Disturbed
- Vincent Neff, David MacLean, Jimmy Dixon, and Tommy Grace of Django Django
- Robby Krieger of The Doors
- Martina Sorbara, Dan Kurtz, and Joel Stouffer of Dragonette
- James Murdoch of The Dungarees
- Joseph Dunwell of The Dunwells
- Dwayne "The Rock" Johnson
- Dylan Bruce
- Ed Sheeran
- Alexander Ebert of Edward Sharpe and the Magnetic Zeros
- Edwin of Crash Karma and I Mother Earth
- Efren Ramirez
- Elle Fanning
- Ellie Goulding
- Emm Gryner
- Emma Thompson and Pierce Brosnan
- Eva Green
- Pete Wentz and Andy Hurley of Fall Out Boy
- Fefe Dobson
- Neil Osbourne of 54-40
- Scott Anderson of Finger Eleven
- Florence Welch of Florence and the Machine
- Tylar Hubbard and Brian Kelley of Florida Georgia Line
- Alex Kapranos and Bob Hardy of Franz Ferdinand
- Joe King, Isaac Slade, Dave Welsh, and Ben Wysocki of The Fray
- Fred Penner
- Scott Hutchison of Frightened Rabbit
- Michael Fitzpatrick of Fitz and the Tantrums
- Nate Ruess of Fun.
- Wade MacNeil of Gallows and Alexisonfire
- Shirley Manson and Duke Erikson of Garbage
- Riki Lindhome of Garfunkel & Oates
- Gary Oldman
- Brian Fallon of The Gaslight Anthem
- Gavin DeGraw
- Gina Gershon
- Eugene Hütz of Gogol Bordello
- Johnny Rzeznik and Robby Takac of Goo Goo Dolls
- Gord Bamford
- Gord Downie of The Tragically Hip
- Gore Verbinski
- Grace Potter
- Alan Doyle of Great Big Sea
- Guillermo del Toro
- Ryan Miller of Guster
- Haley Joel Osment and Genesis Rodriguez
- Hannah Georgas
- Taylor Hanson, Zac Hanson, and Isaac Hanson of Hanson
- Hayden
- Jonathan Russell and Josiah Johnson of The Head & The Heart
- Joacob Hoggard and Dave Rosin of Hedley
- David Vertesi, Ashleigh Ball, and David Beckingham of Hey Ocean!
- Tim Baker of Hey Rosetta!
- Pelle Almqvist and Vigilante Carlstroem of The Hives
- Brian Borcherdt, Graham Walsh, Matt McQuaid, and Matt Schulz of Holy Fuck
- Rusty Matyas and Marti Sarbit of Imaginary Cities
- Dan Reynolds and Wayne Sermon of Imagine Dragons
- John Mullane, Glen Nicholson, Brad Goodsell, and Daniel Ledwell of In-Flight Safety
- JD Fortune and Kirk Pengilly of INXS
- Nicholas Thorburn, Evan Gordon, Geordie Gordon, and Adam Halferty of Islands
- Andrew McMahon of Jack's Mannequin and Something Corporate
- Jack McBrayer
- Jack O'Connell and Callan Mulvey
- Jakob Dylan of The Wallflowers
- Jamie Kennedy
- James Blake
- James Franco and Scott Haze
- Dan Haseltine, Stephen Mason, Matt Odmark, and Charlie Lowell of Jars of Clay
- Jarvis Church of The Philosopher Kings
- Jason Bateman and Tina Fey
- Jason Collett
- Jason Priestley
- Jason Mraz
- Jay Malinowski
- Jeff Baena
- Jenny Lewis of Rilo Kiley
- Jeremy Fisher
- Adam Kittredge of Jets Overhead
- Jill Barber
- Jimmy Cliff
- Jim Adkins and Tom Linton of Jimmy Eat World
- J.J. Abrams
- Joel Plaskett
- Jon Middleton of Jon and Roy
- John Cale of The Velvet Underground
- John Lydon of The Sex Pistols
- Jon Huertas
- Jon Reep and Kyle Davis
- Nick Jonas, Joe Jonas, and Kevin Jonas of the Jonas Brothers
- Jordan Gavaris
- Joseph Gordon-Levitt and Rian Johnson
- Joshua Radin
- Josh Ritter
- Johsua Jackson
- Leah Fay of July Talk
- Justin Bieber
- Justin Kirk
- Justin Long
- Justin Nozuka
- Kate Mara
- Kate Nash
- Kathleen Edwards
- Katy Perry
- Kayo
- Tom Chaplin of Keane
- Kelen Coleman
- Kelly Asbury
- Ken Jeong
- Kendrick Lamar
- Kerli
- Kevin Drew of Broken Social Scene
- Kevin Greutert
- Kevin Hart
- Kevin Nealon
- Kevin Smith
- Kevin Spacey
- Brandon Flowers of The Killers
- K-os
- KT Tunstall
- Hillary Scott, Charles Kelley, and Dave Haywood of Lady Antebellum
- Lady Gaga
- Lake Bell
- Andy Brown, Joel Peat, Adam Pitts, and Ryan Fletcher of Lawson
- Lena Headey
- LeVar Burton
- Lights
- Lindi Ortega
- Lindsay Ell
- Lisa Lampanelli
- Lissie
- Stevie Appleby, Dylan Lynch, and Adam O'Regan of Little Green Cars
- LL Cool J
- John Roderick of The Long Winters
- Wesley Schultz of The Lumineers
- Madchild of Swollen Members
- Margaret Cho
- Mark Pellegrino
- Josh Ramsay, Matt Webb, Mike Ayley, and Ian Casselman of Marianas Trench
- Marina Diamandis of Marina and the Diamonds
- Martha Plimpton
- John Wozniak, Dylan Keefe, and Shlomi Lavie of Marcy Playground
- Rob Thomas of Matchbox Twenty
- Matt Rose and Matt Layzell of The Matinee
- Matt Blais
- Matt Costa
- Matt Dusk
- Matt Good
- Matt Mays
- Matt Walsh and Jeremy Sumpter
- Matthew Barber
- Matthew Goode and Allen Leech
- Colin Hay of Men At Work
- Kirk Hammett and Robert Trujillo of Metallica
- Lars Ulrich of Metallica and Nimród Antal
- Jimmy Shaw and Emily Haines of Metric (appear in two segments)
- Andrew VanWyngarden and Ben Goldwasser of MGMT
- Michael McGowan
- Mike Tompkins
- Miss Piggy
- Missi Pyle
- Monica Potter
- Mickey Dolenz of The Monkees
- Molly Johnson
- Morgan Freeman
- Ryan Gulldemond of Mother Mother
- Justin Pierre of Motion City Soundtrack
- Vince Neil and Nikki Sixx of Mötley Crüe
- Steve Bays, Hawksley Workman, and Ryan Dahle of Mounties
- Lizzy Plapinger and Max Hershenow of MS MR
- Ben Lovett and Winston Marshall of Mumford & Sons
- Mike Herrera of MxPx
- Gerard Way and Mikey Way of My Chemical Romance
- Matthew Caws of Nada Surf
- Chad Gilbert of New Found Glory
- Jordan Knight and Danny Wood of New Kids on the Block
- Carl Newman and Kathryn Calder of the New Pornographers
- Daniel Victor of Neverending White Lights
- Nick Frost and Edgar Wright
- Chad Kroeger, Mike Kroeger, Daniel Adair, and Ryan Peake of Nickelback
- Nicole Sullivan
- Nikki Williams
- Matty Healy of The 1975
- Gwen Stefani, Tony Kanal, Tom Dumont, and Adrian Young of No Doubt
- Charlie Fink of Noah and the Whale
- Noel Johnson
- Norman Reedus
- Gem Archer of Oasis
- Oscar Nunez
- Craig Northey of Odds
- Nanna Bryndís Hilmarsdóttir, Brynjar Leifsson, and Kristján Kristjánsson of Of Monsters and Men
- Damian Kulash and Tim Nordwind of OK Go
- Raine Maida of Our Lady Peace
- Owen Pallett
- Adam Young of Owl City
- Hayley Williams, Taylor York, and Jeremy Davis of Paramore
- Michael Angelakos of Passion Pit
- Patrick Watson
- Paul Bettany
- Pete Townshend of The Who
- Phillip Phillips
- Thomas Mars and Laurent Brancowitz of Phoenix
- Matthew Woodley of Plants and Animals
- Priyanka Chopra
- Psy
- Rod Davis of The Quarrymen
- Marshall Burns of Rah Rah
- Gary LeVox, Jay DeMarcus, and Joe Don Rooney of Rascal Flatts
- Raekwon of Wu-Tang Clan
- Rebecca Hall
- Aaron Barrett and Ryland Steen of Reel Big Fish
- Reno Collier
- Richard J. Lewis
- Rick Springfield
- Tim McIlrath of Rise Against
- Rita Ora
- Rob Zombie and Sheri Moon Zombie
- Robert De Niro and Sylvester Stallone
- Robert Patrick
- Robin Thicke
- Roger Mooking of Bass is Base
- Ron Sexsmith
- Royal Wood
- Russell Peters
- Ben Worcester and Tyler Bancroft of Said the Whale
- Sam Roberts
- Sam Smith
- Sarah Harmer
- Sarah McLachlan
- Sarah Slean
- Sarah Wayne Callies and Arlen Escarpeta
- Scott Waugh
- Scott Weiland of Stone Temple Pilots and Velvet Revolver
- Danny O'Donoghue of The Script
- Selena Gomez
- Serena Ryder
- Jason Ross of Seven Mary Three
- Shad
- Sharon Van Etten
- Shawn Levy
- Shaun Majumder
- Ewan Currie and Ryan Gullen of The Sheepdogs
- Nik Kozub of Shout Out Out Out Out
- Daniel Johns of Silverchair
- Simon Helberg
- Pierre Bouvier, Jeff Stinco, and David Desrosiers of Simple Plan
- Ken Block of Sister Hazel
- Skylar Grey
- Slash of Guns N' Roses and Velvet Revolver
- Chris Murphy and Jay Ferguson of Sloan
- Jonny Quinn of Snow Patrol
- Chris Barron of Spin Doctors
- Aaron Lewis and Mike Mushok of Staind
- Amy Millan of Stars
- Chris Seligman and Pat McGee of Stars
- Stephen Bishop
- Stephen Root
- Steve Byrne
- Steve Jones of the Sex Pistols
- Steve-O
- Roger Hodgson of Supertramp
- Jon Foreman and Tim Foreman of Switchfoot
- Suzie McNeil
- Eddie Reyes of Taking Back Sunday
- Taylor Kitsch
- Jeff Martin of The Tea Party
- Terri Clark
- Tyler Connolly, Dave Brenner, Dean Back, and Joey Dandeneau of Theory of a Deadman
- Nick Hexum of 311
- Adam Gontier and Brad Walst of Three Days Grace
- Tia Carrere
- Tim McGraw
- Tim Reynolds of Dave Matthews Band
- Titus Welliver
- Todd Kerns of Age of Electric
- Todd Phillips
- David Monks, Graham Wright, Josh Hook, and Greg Alsop of Tokyo Police Club
- Tom Odell
- Tommy Chong
- Tony Hale
- Tracy Morgan
- Pat Monahan of Train
- Skinhead Rob of The Transplants
- Colin McDonald and John-Angus McDonald of The Trews
- Vincent D'Onofrio, Vera Farmiga, and Jeremy Strong
- Gordon Gano of Violent Femmes
- Sarah Blackwood of Walk Off the Earth
- Wally Pfister
- Daniel Greaves and Joey Serlin of The Watchmen
- Nathan Williams and Stephen Pope of Wavves
- John K. Samson of The Weakerthans
- Harry McVeigh, Charles Cave, and Jack Lawrence-Brown of White Lies
- Luke Doucet of Whitehorse
- Shaun Verrault of Wide Mouth Mason
- will.i.am of the Black Eyed Peas
- Loel Campbell of Wintersleep
- Chris Ross of Wolfmother
- Gavin Gardiner of The Wooden Sky
- Francois Comtois of Young the Giant
- Jeff Innes, Brandon Scott, and John Jeffrey of Yukon Blonde
- Zach Braff
- Zach Knighton
- Zack Snyder
- Ziggy Marley
- Zoe Saldaña
- ZZ Ward
