= The Barmitzvah Brothers =

Canadian indie pop band

- Origin: Guelph, Ontario, Canada
- Genres: Indie pop
- Years active: 2000–present
- Label: Weewerk
- Members: Jenny Mitchell; Geordie Gordon; Johnny Merritt; Tristan O’Malley
- Past members: Sylvie Smith; Caitlin Hurst; Gillian Manford

The Barmitzvah Brothers are a Canadian indie pop band from Guelph. Known for their use of fiddle as well as unusual and homemade instruments, and for their quirky and original lyrics focusing on everyday life, the working world and ordinary people. The band's sound crosses many genres.

== History ==
The band was formed in April 2000 and originally consisted of three members. Jenny Mitchell, Gillian Manford and Geordie Gordon, son of Canadian singer-songwriter James Gordon, started the band to compete in a school talent show. The group was dubbed the Barmitzvah Brothers after a friend commented that their music was reminiscent of a Jewish celebration. The band began playing at local events, festivals and bars. Johnny Merritt joined a year later. They soon began to perform outside of Guelph around Ontario and have since toured in Canada and Europe. The group has even been featured on several television programs, including YTV's "To The Max".

The Barmitzvah Brothers collaborated with Sylvie Smith and Tristan O'Malley; the latter later became the fourth full-time member of the band.

The Barmitzvah Brothers released their first official record, "The Night of the Party" in 2001; the record was self-released. They soon signed with local record label Robosapien. The band released several albums, including Growing Branches in 2011; that album appeared on the !earshot Campus and Community National Top 50 Albums chart in January 2012.

The Barmitzvah Brothers are currently on the Weewerk label.

== Members ==
Contrary to their name, The Barmitzvah Brothers are not composed of Jewish relatives, nor are they strictly male. The band has four full-time members: Jenny Mitchell, John Merritt, Geordie Gordon and Tristian O’Malley. They are also occasionally joined by part-time member Sylvie Smith. Mitchell is primarily vocals, bass and omnichord, and she writes group's witty lyrics. Gordon is also a singer, and plays violin and keyboard. Merritt provides drums and other percussion, and experiments on the keyboard. O’Malley later joined and contributed guitar. In addition to these roles, each band member plays a rotating variety of other instruments, giving the band its signature sound.

All of the band members have jobs outside of the band. Mitchell performs on her own as Jenny Omnichord, is a member of The Burning Hell, and plays with Richard Laviolette and Oil Spills. Gordon is a member of the bands The Magic, the Salt Lick Kids, and has toured with Human Highway and Islands; he also plays violin with The Burning Hell and Richard Laviolette and the Oil Spills. Merritt has played with several Guelph bands including Brides and The Skeletones Four. O'Malley was a member of the Neutron Stars. Smith was a member of Habitat with John O'Regan of The D'Urbervilles and Diamond Rings; she is currently in the bands The Magic, with Geordie, and Evening Hymns.

== Discography ==
=== Albums ===
- The Night of the Party (Barmitzvah Brothers album)|The Night of the Party Released 2002
- Mr. Bones' Walk in Closet Released October 31, 2003
- ...And a happy new album! Released December 24, 2004
- The Century of Invention Released January 12, 2006
- Let's Express Our Motives: An Album of Under-Appreciated Job Songs Released October 6, 2007
- Growing Branches Released September 16, 2011
