= Vapours (album) =

Studio album by Islands
- Released: September 22, 2009
- Genre: Indie rock
- Length: 42:22
- Label: ANTI-
- Producers: Chris Coady; Nick Diamonds

Islands chronology
Arm's Way (2008)	Vapours (2009)	A Sleep & a Forgetting (2012)

Vapours is the third studio album by Montreal-based indie rock band Islands. It was released on September 22, 2009 via ANTI-. Production was handled by Nick Diamonds and Chris Coady.

In the United States, the album debuted at number 35 on the Billboard Heatseekers Albums chart.

== Critical reception ==
Professional ratings
Aggregate scores
Source	Rating
Metacritic	79/100
Review scores
Source	Rating
AllMusic	3.5/5 stars
Alternative Press	3.5/5
Beats Per Minute	55/100%
CHARTattack	4/5
Consequence of Sound	C+
Now	4/5 Ns
Pitchfork	7.8/10
PopMatters	8/10
Spin	7/10 marks
The A.V. Club	A−

Vapours was met with generally favourable reviews from music critics. At Metacritic, which assigns a normalized rating out of 100 to reviews from mainstream publications, the album received an average score of 79, based on thirteen reviews.

Chris Martins of The A.V. Club praised the album, stating: "each maintains a newfound cool, which must be the result of Islands' principal dudes realizing that they could live without one another, but that they're far deadlier songwriters together". Andrew Rennie of Now claimed: "Vapours dutifully recognizes the playful history of the group and, with the re-addition of drummer Jamie Thompson, is sure to appease followers and win over new listeners". Craig Carson of PopMatters declared that the album "benefits from its willingness to engage its detractors, tighten up its muscles, revel in the strengths of its songwriting and show yet another angle to the music of Islands".

Pitchfork reviewer wrote: "though there is an overall whiff of the 1980s about Vapours, it sidesteps the traps of either sounding trendily vintage or indistinguishable from the rest of today's Reagan-era impostors. It works best, however, to think of the album as a return to Return to the Sea, only, as its title suggests, in a hazier, less opaque form". AllMusic's Tim Sendra wrote: "showing more than a trace of the bombast of Arm's Way, a couple of songs like "Drums" and "Shining" collapse under their own weight and are the only things that keep Vapours from being Islands' best work. Still, this is a welcome return to form for the band". Dan LeRoy of Alternative Press saw Thorburn's "created the 'good, good pop record' he threatened with Arm's Way, wisely getting out of his own way and letting the simple but undeniable pleasures of the Motownish title track, the synth-happy '80s pastiche 'Tender Torture' and his latest Brian Wilson homage, 'On Foreigner', with its massed Beach Boys harmonies, shine through". Josh Modell of Spin stated: "call it Nick Diamonds Gets His Groove Back. Former Unicorn Nick Thorburn went a bit dark and dreary on 2008's Arm's Way, but with Vapours, the transplanted New Yorker relearns his playfulness".

=== Accolades ===
Accolades for Vapours
Publication	Accolade	Rank	Ref.
Slant	The 25 Best Albums & Singles of 2009	20	

== Track listing ==
All tracks are written by Nicholas Thorburn.

No.	Title	Length
1.	"Switched On"	3:31
2.	"No You Don't"	3:44
3.	"Vapours"	2:41
4.	"Devout"	2:29
5.	"Disarming the Car Bomb"	4:11
6.	"Tender Torture"	3:32
7.	"Shining"	4:01
8.	"On Foreigner"	4:52
9.	"Heartbeat"	3:08
10.	"The Drums"	2:46
11.	"Eol"	3:21
12.	"Everything Is Under Control"	4:06
Total length:		42:22

== Personnel ==
- Nicholas "Nick Diamonds" Thorburn – lyrics, vocals, guitar, synthesizer, mellotron, omnichord, producer
- Geordie Gordon – guitar (track 3), keyboards, piano, synthesizer, omnichord
- Evan Gordon – guitar (tracks: 4, 11), electric sitar (track 2), synthesizer, bass, additional drums
- Jamie "J'aime Tambeur" Thompson – drums, percussion, drum machine, drum programming
- Aaron P. Johnson – horns (track 3)
- Eric Beyondo – horns (track 3)
- Stuart Bogie – horns (track 3)
- Chris Coady – producer, engineering, mixing
- Adam Tilzer – additional engineering
- Atsuo Matsumoto – engineering assistant
- Greg Calbi – mastering
- Trevor Hernandez – design, layout
- Aliya Naumoff – photography

== Charts ==
Chart (2009)	Peak position
US Heatseekers Albums (Billboard)	35
