= The Unicorns =

Canadian rock band

- Origin: Montreal, Quebec
- Genres: Indie rock, indie pop, lo-fi
- Years active: 2000–2004, 2014
- Labels: Caterpillars of the Community, Alien8, Suicide Squeeze, Rough Trade
- Past members: Nick "Neil" Diamonds; Alden Ginger; J'aime Tambeur

The Unicorns were a Canadian rock band formed in the year 2000 by Nicholas Thorburn (Nick Diamonds) of British Columbia and Alden Penner (Alden Ginger) of Quebec. J'aime Tambeur joined in December 2003. The band announced their split in late 2004, before reuniting for a short run of shows in 2014.

== History ==
The Unicorns began in Canada in December 2000. The founding members Nicholas Thorburn and Alden Penner met in high school in 1998. Alden was new to his 10th-grade class and decided to wear a skirt to school, which intrigued a 12th-grade Nick and quickly sparked their friendship. The duo self-recorded a nine-track CD entitled Unicorns Are People Too which was released in March 2003 through their own label Caterpillars of the Community. The release was limited to 500 copies, but was later distributed widely through file-sharing networks and fansites. Around this time they also self-recorded a Mini CDr entitled Three Inches of Blood which was given to venue owners who arranged the band's early shows. A split 7-inch with Arcade Fire was also announced, but never materialized.

In June and July 2003, the band recorded their debut studio LP Who Will Cut Our Hair When We're Gone? with producer Mark Lawson in Montreal. The album featured several reworked versions of songs from Unicorns Are People Too and featured contributions from Richard Reed Parry (Arcade Fire) and drummer Jamie Thompson who joined the band as a touring member later that year. The album was released in November 2003 on Alien8 Recordings in North America and Rough Trade in Europe. The album received glowing reviews from The Village Voice, NME, online magazine Pitchfork Media and numerous other publications around the world.

The band toured continuously across North America, Europe and Australia following the release of Who Will Cut Our Hair When We're Gone?, including shows with The Decemberists, The Fiery Furnaces, Hot Hot Heat, and Arcade Fire. A promotional video was also produced for the song "Jellybones", which aired occasionally on MTV2's 120 Minutes. In 2004, footage from multiple live performances was used to produce a promotional video for the song "I Was Born (A Unicorn)". In May 2004, an EP entitled The Unicorns: 2014 was released by Seattle label Suicide Squeeze. The band became known for their chaotic live shows, described as "unruly, sometimes transcendent, sometimes akin to tantrums".

== Split and subsequent projects ==
The band's hectic touring schedule became exhausting, leading to tensions between band members. Their final show of 2004 took place at the Engine Room in Houston, Texas, on December 20, where they played several unreleased songs including "Haunted House", "Livin' in the Country", and "Rough Gem" (later recorded by Islands). On December 28, a short message appeared on the Unicorns' website reading "THE UNICORNS ARE DEAD, (R.I.P.)", leading fans to speculate as to whether they had broken up. In January 2005, the website Drowned In Sound confirmed that the band had indeed split. Asked about the band's demise in 2006, Thompson commented, "we all hated it like 70 percent of the time. It was just not getting along with one another on the road, and then being on the road all the time. That pretty much killed it".

Immediately following the split, Thorburn and Thompson continued to collaborate as Th' Corn Gangg (a hip-hop project featuring Subtitle and Busdriver) and Islands (an indie rock project). On May 28, 2006, Thompson announced his departure from Islands. He returned to the band in June 2009, but left again a year later. In 2005, Thorburn co-wrote the satirical charity single "Do They Know It's Hallowe'en?". His other post-Unicorns projects have included Reefer, Human Highway and Mister Heavenly. In July 2011, he released an album entitled I Am an Attic through Bandcamp, reverting to his Unicorns nickname "Nick Diamonds".

In 2005, Penner released a 7-inch single entitled "The Ghost of Creaky Crater" on the Melbourne-based Art School Dropout label, recorded while the band was on tour in Australia. His post-Unicorns musical projects have included Clues and The Hidden Words, in which he reunited with Thompson. In February 2014, he released solo album entitled Exegesis though Bandcamp.

== Reunion ==
In early 2014, ten years after their split, it was announced that the band would reunite to support Arcade Fire on a handful of arena shows in Inglewood, California, and Brooklyn, New York. On September 21, 2014, they returned to the Pop Montreal Festival to play a headline show at Metropolis, but have not announced any further live dates. Who Will Cut Our Hair When We're Gone? was also reissued on CD and vinyl through the band's own imprint, Caterpillar Records.

== Members ==
- Nick 'Neil' Diamonds (Nicholas Thorburn) – vocals, guitars, bass, keys
- Alden Ginger (Alden Penner) – vocals, guitars, bass, keys
- J'aime Tambeur (Jamie Thompson) – drums

== Discography ==
=== Albums ===
- Unicorns Are People Too self-released CD (2003)
- Who Will Cut Our Hair When We're Gone? CD/LP (2003, reissued 2014)

=== Singles/EPs ===
- Three Inches of Blood Mini CDR (2002)
- The Unicorns: 2014 CD/7" (2004)

== See also ==
- Islands
- Clues
- Human Highway
