= Richard Laviolette =

Canadian singer-songwriter (1982–2023)

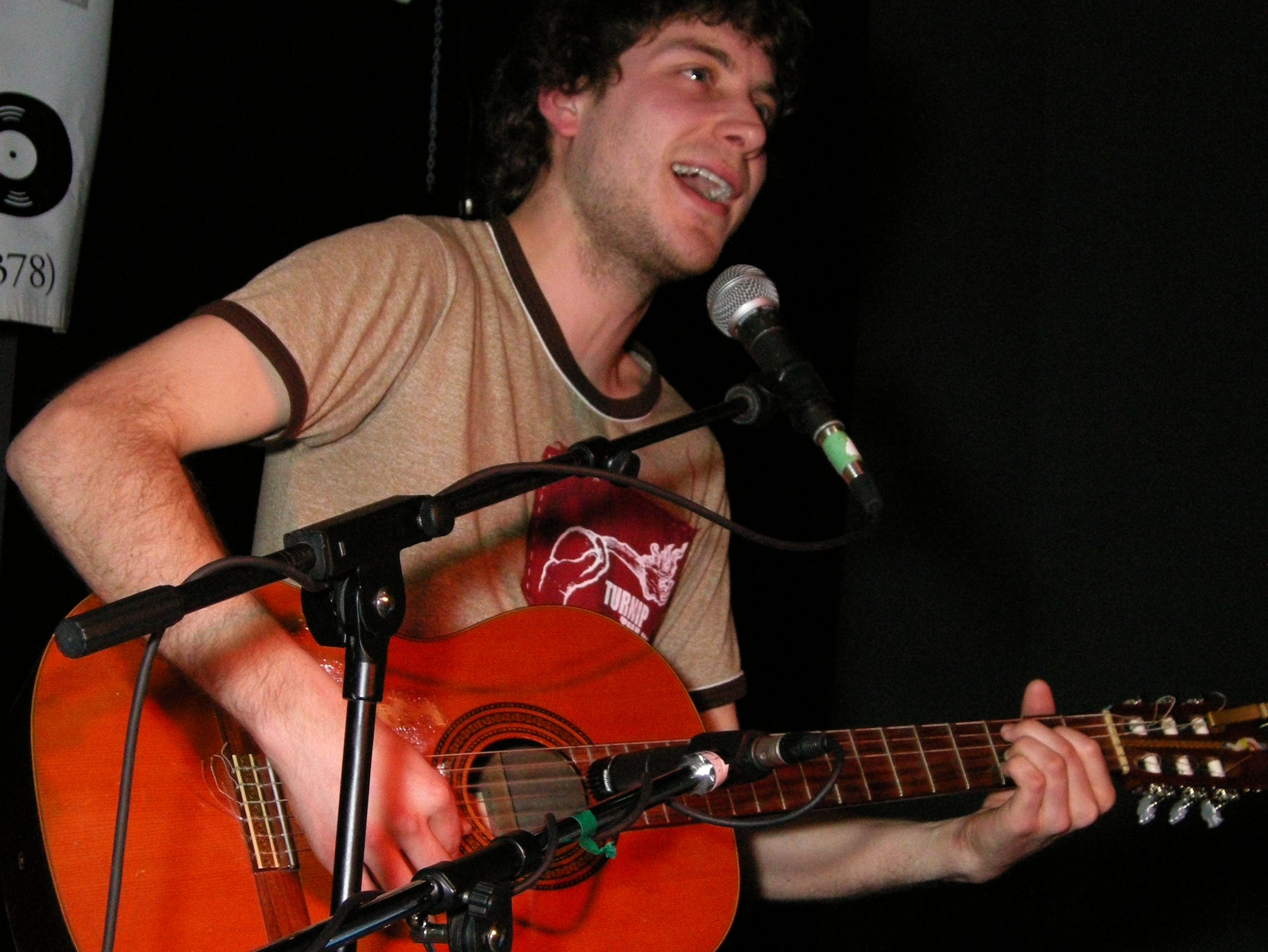
- Laviolette performing live in 2008

Background information
- Born: Richard Andrew Laviolette; August 22, 1982; Port Colborne, Ontario, Canada
- Origin: Tara, Ontario, Canada
- Died: September 5, 2023 (aged 41)
- Genres: Acoustic rock Alt country Folk rock
- Occupations: Singer-songwriter, record label owner
- Instruments: Vocals, guitar, harmonica, mandolin, percussion
- Years active: 2003–2023
- Labels: Burnt Oak Records, You've Changed Records
- Formerly of: Brides; Elbow Beach Surf Club; Tasseomancy; Chris Yang; Ryan Newell; Households; Jenny Omnichord
- Website: Richard Laviolette @ Sonicbids.com

Richard Andrew Laviolette (August 22, 1982 – September 5, 2023) was a Canadian singer-songwriter based in Guelph, Ontario. He released material under a variety of band names, including Mary Carl, Richard Laviolette and His Black Lungs, Richard Laviolette and the Oil Spills, Richard Laviolette and the Hollow Hooves, and Richard Laviolette and the Glitter Bombs.

== Early life and education ==
Laviolette was born in Port Colborne, Ontario on August 22, 1982. He grew up in Tara, Ontario and lived with his family on a small hobby beef farm during high school. In his youth, he learned to play several instruments, including the mandolin and guitar, from his father, becoming proficient in traditional folk and country mandolin styles. In an interview with Queen's The Journal, he says his family played an important role in fostering an appreciation for music. His parents, Darrell and Marie, were both musical, holding family sing-alongs and jamborees.

When Laviolette entered high school, he was introduced to musicians who did not receive much mainstream exposure, such as Hayden and Elliott Smith. During his teenage years, he played in several bands throughout the Tara, Chesley and Owen Sound areas of Ontario. He played in Sharp Pointy Stick, with his brother and cousin, playing local shows at bars despite being underage.

Laviolette attended the University of Guelph with the intention of becoming a teacher. He studied history before dropping out to pursue music full-time.

== Career ==
Laviolette's debut album began in the autumn of 2003 under the name Mary Carl, while he was still a student at Guelph. Mary Carl, the person whom the band was named after, reportedly resented the name. The album was recorded in the bedroom of friend Adam Scott, with Michelle Dyck contributing additional vocals. Incorporating guitar, cello, harmonica, piano, accordion, and floor tom, Mary Carl was released on April 1, 2005.

His second album, A Little Less Like a Rock, a Little More Like Home, released on Burnt Oak Records in 2006. The album cover was silk-screened and machine-stitched by Laviolette and his friends, and his family sang group vocals on the track Fussin' and Fightin'. It reached spot 127 on the campus/community radio airplay charts in November 2006. The Exclaim! review of the album described Laviolette as an "old soul", with a voice that "can swing from a delicate whisper to a guttural bark in the same breath". The album also made a mark locally, with The Record in Kitchener saying Laviolette was on "the cutting edge of the local scene", along with James Gordon's son Geordie Gordon.

Released in 2009, the rock album Aging Recycling Plant was recorded with Pinball House in Guelph by Dan Beeson with the backing band The Hollow Hooves. In a review of the album for Exclaim! Vish Khanna referred to its lyrics as "too complex and artful to pigeonhole." Several of the songs had been inspired by Laviolette's on Six Nations of the Grand River land, supporting land reclamation efforts near Caledonia.

Laviolette released the country-inspired album All of Your Raw Materials in 2010. It was recorded by Andy Magoffin at House of Miracles in London, Ontario. The Oil Spills, who played on and toured the album, included Jenny Mitchell, Geordie Gordon and Lisa Bozikovic. You've Changed Records re-released the album on vinyl in 2010. It was the first time the label had issued an album from outside of the labels founding group.

Taking the Long Way Home was released in 2017, featuring piano by Lisa Bozikovic and backing vocals by Jessy Bell Smith. The album began as a project with his father, who had to step away to care for Laviolette's ailing mother who had Huntington's disease. The album was released by You've Changed Records and was produced by Andy Magoffin in Cambridge, Ontario.

In addition to his own releases, Laviolette frequently collaborated with other artists. In 2007 the split EP Hands and Feats with Burnt Oak Records label-mate Jiaqing Wilson-Yang. They supported the release with a seven-week tour of the United States and Canada. We Wanna Know, a 2009 collaboration with Sarah Mangle, was followed by another tour and an opening performance at Electric Eclectics in Meaford, Ontario.

== Illness and death ==
In 2022, Laviolette began experiencing the onset of Huntington's disease. His symptoms worsened more quickly than anticipated and he decided to receive MAiD (medical assistance in dying). He died on September 5, 2023, at the age of 41.

Along with news of Laviolette's death, it was announced that a forthcoming album, All Wild Things Are Shy, had been recorded in early 2023 with Scott Merritt at The Cottage in Guelph, Ontario and would be released at a later date by You've Changed Records. In a tribute post Steve Lambke said: "Everything I can think to say today about love and loss and the way to celebrate life through music, Richard has said in one of his songs. They burst with life and mortality, with guts and glory, with love, justice, honesty, and a beautiful mischief."

The album was released on September 5, 2024, the one-year anniversary of his death. It was longlisted for the 2025 Polaris Music Prize, and its song "Constant Love" was longlisted for the Polaris SOCAN Song Prize.

== Discography ==
- Mary Carl (2005)
- A Little Less Like a Rock, a Little More Like Home (2006)
- Hands and Feats (with Jiaqing Wilson-Yang) (2007)
- Aging Recycling Plant (2009)
- All of Your Raw Materials (2010)
- Soundtrack to the Life of a Car Nearly Driving into the Pacific (2010)
- Over the Roar of the Engine (Richard Laviolette and the Glitter Bombs, 2013)
- Taking the Long Way Home (2017)
- All Wild Things Are Shy (2024)
