= Do They Know It's Hallowe'en? =

Single by The North American Hallowe'en Prevention Initiative
- Released: October 11, 2005
- Length: 5:58
- Label: Vice
- Composers: Nick Diamonds; Adam Gollner
- Producer: Danny Kalb

"Do They Know It's Hallowe'en?" is a charity record inspired by "Do They Know It's Christmas?". It was released on October 11, 2005, in Canada on Vice Records by a cast of rock artists and other performers under the name "North American Halloween Prevention Initiative" (NAHPI). It reached number four on the Canadian Singles Chart.

It was written by Nick Diamonds and Adam Gollner. Like its inspiration, it is a charity song, with all proceeds being donated to UNICEF. According to the official press release, the song "stems from a frustration with other benefit songs' misguided, somewhat patronizing attitude, and Western-centric worldview."

== Contributors ==
- Win Butler & Régine Chassagne of Arcade Fire
- Beck
- Buck 65
- David Cross
- Liane Balaban of Dessert
- Devendra Banhart (with Noah Georgeson, Jona Bechtolt & Luckey Remington)
- Elvira, Mistress of the Dark
- Feist
- Gino Washington
- Syd Butler of Les Savy Fav
- J'aime Tambeur of Islands
- Malcolm McLaren
- Nardwuar the Human Serviette
- Peaches
- Dntel
- Jenny Lewis & Blake Sennett of Rilo Kiley
- Roky Erickson
- Chris Murphy of Sloan
- Asya & Chloe of Chaos Chaos
- Stephin Merritt of The Magnetic Fields
- Thurston Moore of Sonic Youth
- Russell Mael of Sparks
- Subtitle
- Steve Jocz of Sum 41
- Tanya Tagaq
- Anna Waronker of That Dog
- Dan Boeckner & Spencer Krug of Wolf Parade
- Karen O of Yeah Yeah Yeahs

=== NAHPI band ===
- Adam Gollner of We Are Molecules - guitar
- Nick Diamonds of Islands - keyboards
- Steve McDonald of Redd Kross - bass
- Joey Waronker - drums
- music & words by Nick Diamonds and Adam Gollner
- produced by Steven "Deadd Kross" McDonald, Adam "Ghoulner" Gollner, & Nick "Diamonds" Thorburn
- mixed by Danny Kalb at The Boat, Los Angeles, CA
- NAHPI band recorded by Steve McDonald at his studio in Los Angeles, California

Additional vocal engineers: Jamie Thompson (Gino's kitchen, Detroit), Cornelius Rapp (Studio Rapp, Berlin), Raf Katigbak (Studio 264, Manila), Greig Nori (bunkrock, Toronto), John Collins (JCDC, Vancouver), Russell Mael (Sparks' studio, Los Angeles), Danny Kalb (The Boat, Los Angeles), Mark Lawson (the White House, Casablanca), Stuart Sullivan (Wire Studios, Austin), Donn Devore (Avast! II, Seattle), Jona Becholt (VW camper, Estonia), Jay Ferguson (Jay's basement, Halifax), Matthew Illachewizch (Cambridge Bay Radio Station, Nunavut)

- choral leader: Anna Waronker
- additional throat singing: Tagaq
- additional sound effects: Régine Chassagne
- artwork & design by Nick Diamonds

track 3 remixed by Disco D at the Booty Barn, Brasil.

track 4 remixed by Th' Corn Gangg at Jamie's, Montreal.

== Track listing ==
1. "Do They Know It's Halloween?" - (5:58)
2. "Do They Know It's Halloween? (Radio Edit)" - (3:35)
3. "Do They Know It's Halloween? (Disco D Remix)" - (3:48)
4. "Do They Know It's Halloween? (Th' Corn Gangg Remix)" - (4:54) [listed as "6:66" on the back of the case]
