= Boxing the Moonlight =

Studio album by Mister Heavenly
- Released: October 6, 2017
- Genre: Indie rock
- Length: 39:02
- Label: Polyvinyl Record Co.

Mister Heavenly chronology
| Out of Love (2011) | Boxing the Moonlight (2017) |

Professional ratings
Aggregate scores
| Source | Rating |
|---|---|
| Metacritic | 70/100 |
Review scores
| Source | Rating |
| The 405 | 7/10 |
| AllMusic | 3.5/5 |
| Spectrum Culture | 3.5/5 stars |
| Under the Radar | 8/10 |

Boxing the Moonlight is the second studio album by Mister Heavenly. It was released on October 6, 2017 on the record label Polyvinyl Record Co. The album finds the trio "embrac[ing] a tougher sound" than on their debut Out of Love.

== Track listing ==
| No. | Title | Length |
|---|---|---|
| 1. | "Beat Down" | 3:15 |
| 2. | "Blue Lines" | 3:31 |
| 3. | "Makin' Excuses" | 3:54 |
| 4. | "Hammer Drop" | 4:22 |
| 5. | "George's Garden" | 3:58 |
| 6. | "No Floor" | 1:44 |
| 7. | "Magic Is Gone" | 3:25 |
| 8. | "Pink Cloud Compression" | 3:31 |
| 9. | "Crazy Love, Vol. III" | 4:43 |
| 10. | "Dead Duck" | 2:23 |
| 11. | "Out of Time" | 4:20 |
