= Three Inches of Blood =

Demo album by The Unicorns
- Released: 2002
- Recorded: 2001–2002
- Genre: Lo-fi, indie pop
- Length: 21:50
- Producer: The Unicorns

The Unicorns chronology
Three Inches of Blood (2002)	Unicorns Are People Too (2003)

Three Inches of Blood is a demo EP released by the Unicorns. The EP was allegedly burned onto 3-inch CD-Rs and given to venue owners in the Campbell River, British Columbia area who would arrange shows for the band.

== Track listing ==
All tracks are written by the Unicorns

No.	Title	Length
1.	"Intro"	0:22
2.	"Jellybones"	2:03
3.	"Segue"	0:08
4.	"Do the Knife Fight"	4:20
5.	"The Unicorns: 2014"	3:36
6.	"Ebb Tide, Azure Sky"	7:16
7.	"Down on the Corner"	1:03
8.	"Peach Moon"	2:42
Total length:		21:50

== Personnel ==
- Nicholas Thorburn (Nick "Neil" Diamonds) - vocals, keyboards, drum kit
- Alden Penner (Alden Ginger) - vocals, guitars, bass, drum kit
