= Jamie Thompson (musician) =

Canadian musician

- Also known as: J'aime Tambeur; Small Is Beautiful
- Origin: Canada
- Genres: Rock and roll, Indie
- Occupations: Musician, songwriter
- Instrument: Drums

Jamie Thompson (stage name: J'aime Tambeur) is a Canadian musician who has been the drummer for several Canadian bands, including Islands and Th' Corn Gangg. Jamie was a founding member of the Unicorns. The band's first major album, Who Will Cut Our Hair When We're Gone?, was a huge hit and helped give the Unicorns a cult following among indie listeners.

Thompson and fellow Unicorns member Nick Thorburn founded the indie-pop/hip-hop band Th' Corn Gangg several months prior to the Unicorns' break-up in December 2004. Thompson and Thorburn went on to form Islands in 2005. Thompson recorded with the band for their debut album, Return to the Sea, which was released in 2006. Shortly before the band's European tour, however, Thompson had left the band.

Islands continued without Thompson. In mid-2008, Islands released their second album, Arm's Way, with Aaron Harris as Thompson's replacement, however he returned for their third album, Vapours, released in September 2009.

In 2013, Thompson collaborated with Rebecca Foon on the Saltland release, I Thought It Was Us But It Was All of Us.
