= A Sleep & a Forgetting =

Studio album by Islands
- Released: February 14, 2012
- Recorded: 2011
- Genre: Indie rock
- Length: 37:43
- Label: ANTI-
- Producers: Nick Diamonds; Evan Gordon

Islands chronology
| Vapours (2009) | A Sleep & a Forgetting (2012) | Ski Mask (2013) |

A Sleep & a Forgetting is the fourth studio album by Canadian indie rock band Islands. It was released on February 14, 2012, via ANTI-. Production was handled by members Nick "Diamonds" Thorburn and Evan Gordon. The album peaked at number 14 on the Heatseekers Albums chart in the United States.

== Critical reception ==
Professional ratings
Aggregate scores
| Source | Rating |
|---|---|
| Metacritic | 69/100 |
Review scores
| Source | Rating |
| AllMusic | 3.5/5 stars |
| Beats Per Minute | 73/100% |
| Now | 3/5 Ns |
| Paste | 7.5/10 |
| Pitchfork | 7.9/10 |
| PopMatters | 7/10 |
| Prefix | 8/10 |
| Slant | 2.5/5 stars |
| Spectrum Culture | 2.5/5 stars |
| Sputnikmusic | 3.5/10 |

A Sleep & a Forgetting was met with generally favorable reviews from music critics. At Metacritic, which assigns a normalized rating out of 100 to reviews from mainstream publications, the album received an average score of 69 based on fifteen reviews.

Jen Kessler of Prefix praised the work, stating: "Thorburn anchors every note, every contribution with a personal outpouring of emotion and heartbreak, the likes of which we've never seen from him before". Larry Fitzmaurice of Pitchfork called the album "the most cohesive-- and, possibly, the out-and-out strongest-- Islands record yet". Chris Brancato of Beats Per Minute noted that "while A Sleep & A Forgetting is a bold new statement for the band, the album occasionally treads on the mundane level, due to its similarly-orchestrated tracks". AllMusic's Tim Sendra resumed: "anyone with a little distance from their own pain will find much to admire in the honesty and craft of the album". Alexander Heigl of PopMatters concluded that "simplicity is A Sleep's best value". Sputnikmusic's emeritus Rudy K. wrote: "[maybe for] the first time, A Sleep And A Forgetting gets at the heart of an artist who, over years of project changes and name switches, has remained frustratingly opaque".

In mixed reviews, Benjamin Boles of NOW Toronto stated: "it might be an imperfect stepping stone, but the staircase he's climbing here shows great promise". Jesse Cataldo of Slant described the album as "mildly composed, generally genial pop, with a few good hooks and ideas scattered throughout".

== Track listing ==
All tracks are written by Nicholas Thorburn.

| No. | Title | Length |
|---|---|---|
| 1. | "In a Dream It Seemed Real" | 3:21 |
| 2. | "This Is Not a Song" | 3:55 |
| 3. | "Never Go Solo" | 4:45 |
| 4. | "No Crying" | 3:05 |
| 5. | "Hallways" | 2:53 |
| 6. | "Can't Feel My Face" | 2:46 |
| 7. | "Lonely Love" | 3:40 |
| 8. | "Oh Maria" | 4:07 |
| 9. | "Cold Again" | 3:19 |
| 10. | "Don't I Love You" | 3:20 |
| 11. | "Same Thing" | 2:32 |
| Total length: | | 37:43 |

== Personnel ==
- Nicholas "Nick Diamonds" Thorburn – lyrics, vocals, guitar (tracks: 1, 3, 4, 7–11), piano (tracks: 2, 3, 5), baritone guitar (track 2), mellotron (tracks: 3, 5), percussion (track 5), Farfisa organ (track 6), synthesizer (track 10), voce horn (track 11), producer, art direction, drawings, layout
- Geordie Gordon – vocals (tracks: 6, 9), Wurlitzer piano & Casiotone organ (track 1), piano (tracks: 1, 5, 7–9), violin (tracks: 1, 2), guitar (tracks: 2–4, 7), Hammond C3 organ (tracks: 2, 11), percussion (track 5), mellotron (tracks: 7, 9–11)
- Evan Gordon – bass (tracks: 1–4, 6–12), guitar & synthesizer (track 5), harpsichord (track 9), Contraire piano (track 10), drum machine (track 11), producer
- Luc Laurent – drums (tracks: 1, 2, 4–11), percussion (tracks: 1–7, 9, 11)
- Celso Estrada – engineering
- Dave Trumfio – engineering
- Rob Schnapf – mixing
- Mark Chalecki – mastering
- Peter Watkins – cover photo
- Trevor Hernandez – art direction, layout
