= Cancer 4 Cure =

Studio album by El-P
- Released: May 22, 2012
- Recorded: 2008–2012
- Genre: Hip-hop
- Length: 49:05
- Label: Fat Possum Records
- Producers: El-P; Nick Diamonds; Little Shalimar; Wilder Zoby

El-P chronology
I'll Sleep When You're Dead (2007)	Cancer 4 Cure (2012)

Singles from Cancer 4 Cure
- 1. "The Full Retard" Released: April 24, 2012

Cancer 4 Cure is the third solo studio album by American rapper and producer El-P. It was released through Fat Possum Records on May 22, 2012. It peaked at No. 71 on the Billboard 200 chart.

== Background ==
The album is dedicated to El-P's friend and fellow rapper Camu Tao, who died of lung cancer in May 2008 at the age of 30. In an interview with Rolling Stone, El-P said, "Camu was a huge inspiration on this record, mostly because he had a huge effect on my life and who I am." He elaborated, "I think that I'm trying to create an idea or illustrate a thought pattern, just because there's darkness that I see and think about, it doesn't mean I've given into it. I think the record is ultimately about not giving into it. For the most part I'm struggling with that darkness throughout the record. When I say it's about wanting to live, I just say that because that's how I feel. When you get hit with death, sometimes as horrible as it is, one of the things that can come out of it is a reaffirmation of how much you don't want to go, and I think that's what happened with me."

== Critical reception ==
Professional ratings
Aggregate scores
Source	Rating
AnyDecentMusic?	8.2/10
Metacritic	84/100
Review scores
Source	Rating
AllMusic	4/5 stars
The A.V. Club	A
Chicago Tribune	3.5/4 stars
The Guardian	4/5 stars
Los Angeles Times	4/4 stars
Mojo	4/5 stars
Pitchfork	8.5/10
Q	4/5 stars
Rolling Stone	3.5/5 stars
Spin	7/10

At Metacritic, which assigns a rating out of 100 to reviews from mainstream critics, the album has received a score of 84 based on 39 reviews, indicating "universal acclaim".

David Jeffries of AllMusic stated, "Cancer 4 Cure is about hip-hop like Glengarry Glen Ross was about sales, but these great works transcend their industries, offering solace and inspiration to anyone who would prefer a satisfied mind over a Cadillac Eldorado, or in current terms, an Escalade."

In a more critical review, Dan Weiss of The Boston Phoenix stated that the album "is definitely not El-P's Age of Apocalypse" and that "in fact it's the only El-P production that sounds like it's been made on planet Earth, following hip-hop rules that someone else already defined".

Accolades for Cancer 4 Cure
Publication	Accolade	Rank	Ref.
The 405	Albums of the Year	12	
Beats per Minute	The Top 50 Albums of 2012	34	
Chicago Tribune (Greg Kot)	Top 10 Albums of 2012	7	
Cokemachineglow	Top 50 Albums 2012	3	
Complex	The 50 Best Albums of 2012	10	
Consequence of Sound	Top 50 Albums of 2012	25	
Exclaim!	Best Albums of 2012: Top 50 Albums of the Year	14	
No Ripcord	Top 50 Albums Of 2012	36	
Obscure Sound	Best Albums of 2012	35	
Paste	The 50 Best Albums of 2012	12	
Pitchfork	The Top 50 Albums of 2012	45	
PopMatters	The 75 Best Albums of 2012	35	
PopMatters	The Best Hip-Hop of 2012	4	
Pretty Much Amazing	Best Albums of 2012	20	
Spin	40 Best Hip-Hop Albums of 2012	Unranked	
Spinner	The 50 Best Albums of 2012	33	
Stereogum	Top 50 Albums of 2012	15	
Treble	Top 50 Albums of 2012	22	
The Village Voice	Pazz & Jop	26	

== Track listing ==
All tracks are written and produced by El-P, except where noted.

No.	Title	Writer(s)	Producer(s)	Length
1.	"Request Denied"			4:32
2.	"The Full Retard"	Jaime Meline; Tero Smith		3:39
3.	"Works Every Time"			3:35
4.	"Drones Over Bklyn"		El-P; Little Shalimar	5:49
5.	"Oh Hail No" (featuring Mr. Muthafuckin' eXquire and Danny Brown)	Meline; Hugh Allison; Daniel Sewell		3:41
6.	"Tougher Colder Killer" (featuring Killer Mike and Despot)	Meline; Michael Render; Alec Reinstein		3:39
7.	"True Story"			3:14
8.	"The Jig Is Up"		El-P; Little Shalimar	3:18
9.	"Sign Here"			2:51
10.	"For My Upstairs Neighbor (Mums the Word)"		El-P; Wilder Zoby	3:15
11.	"Stay Down" (featuring Nick Diamonds)	Meline; Nicholas Thorburn	El-P; Nick Diamonds; Little Shalimar	3:10
12.	"$4 Vic/Nothing but You+Me (FTL)"			8:23
Total length:				49:05

== Personnel ==
Credits adapted from liner notes.

- El-P – vocals, design
- Little Shalimar – guitar (1, 2, 10, 12), vocoder (6), guitar effect (7), synthesizer (12), recording (all tracks)
- Wilder Zoby – synthesizer (1), keyboards (3, 5, 7, 12)
- Isaiah "Ikey" Owens – organ (1, 6), keyboards (5, 7, 9)
- James McNew – bass guitar (1, 6, 10)
- Camu Tao – vocals (2)
- Paul Banks – vocals (3)
- Jaleel Bunton – guitar (3)
- Mr. Muthafuckin' eXquire – vocals (5)
- Danny Brown – vocals (5)
- Dave "Smoota" Smith – horns (11)
- Killer Mike – vocals (6)
- Despot – vocals (6)
- Matt Sweeney – guitar (6, 12)
- Himanshu Suri – vocals (7)
- Nick Diamonds – vocals (11)
- Biondo – vocals (12)
- Joey Raia – mixing
- Glenn Schick – mastering
- Ron Croudy – design
- Timothy Saccenti – photography

== Charts ==
Chart (2012)	Peak position
US Billboard 200	71
US Independent Albums (Billboard)	15
US Top R&B/Hip-Hop Albums (Billboard)	7
