= The Unicorns: 2014 =

EP by The Unicorns
- Released: May 18, 2004
- Genre: Lo-fi, indie pop
- Length: 15:06
- Label: Suicide Squeeze Records; S-037
- Producer: The Unicorns

The Unicorns chronology
Who Will Cut Our Hair When We're Gone? (2003)	The Unicorns: 2014 (2004)

Professional ratings
Review scores
Source	Rating
Pitchfork Media	(3.6/10)

The Unicorns: 2014 is an EP by the Unicorns released in 2004 by Suicide Squeeze Records. It was the band's final release prior to their split in late 2004. The 7" version was pressed on purple vinyl and limited to 2,000 copies.

== Track listing ==
All songs written and composed by the Unicorns.

=== 7" ===
No.	Title	Length
1.	"The Unicorns: 2014"	3:56
2.	"Emasculate the Masculine"	4:15

=== CD ===
No.	Title	Length
1.	"The Unicorns: 2014"	3:56
2.	"Emasculate the Masculine"	4:15
3.	"Evacuate the Vacuous" (Outtake from W.W.C.O.H.W.W.G. Sessions, July 2003)	3:20
4.	"The Unicorns: 2014" (Demo, Autumn 2002)	3:35
Total length:		15:06
