= Who Will Cut Our Hair When We're Gone? =

Studio album by the Unicorns
- Released: October 21, 2003
- Recorded: June – July 2003
- Genres: Indie rock, indie pop, lo-fi
- Length: 41:03
- Labels: Alien8, Rough Trade
- Producer: Mark Lawson

The Unicorns chronology
Unicorns Are People Too (2003)	Who Will Cut Our Hair When We're Gone? (2003)	The Unicorns: 2014 (2004)

Alternate cover
- 2014 reissue cover

Who Will Cut Our Hair When We're Gone? is the second and final studio album by Canadian indie rock band the Unicorns. It features several re-arranged versions of songs from their earlier self-released album Unicorns Are People Too. The album was first issued on CD and on vinyl in North America by Alien8 Recordings on October 21, 2003, and on CD in Europe by Rough Trade Records in 2004. It has since been repressed in limited quantities on pink and brown vinyl by Alien8 and was re-released on August 26, 2014 on the band's own label, Caterpillar Records.

== Critical reception ==
Professional ratings
Aggregate scores
Source	Rating
Metacritic	77/100
Review scores
Source	Rating
AllMusic	3/5 stars
The Boston Phoenix	3.5/4 stars
Consequence of Sound	A−
DIY	4.5/5 stars
Drowned in Sound	9/10
Mojo	3/5 stars
NME	8/10
Pitchfork	8.9/10
Stylus Magazine	B+
Uncut	3/5 stars

The album received positive reviews. Shortly after its release, Eric Carr of Pitchfork wrote that "even at their goofiest, The Unicorns' level of comfort with their material-- and the obvious confidence that engenders-- makes it all seem totally natural and new". After its 2014 re-issue, Pitchfork's Stuart Berman called it "messy and often brilliant", writing that the album is "too complex to be classified as garage-rock, too unsettled to be psychedelic, too hooky to be described as art-damaged, and too fiercely funky to lapse into twee solipsism".

Adam Kivel of Consequence of Sound wrote that, throughout the album, "death and darkness haunt everything, even the cheeky synth tones and joyous guitars, but that shouldn't stop you from dancing". Justin Cober-Lake of PopMatters called the album "one of the year's most enjoyable", and Adam Lalama of Noisey wrote that it is "incontestably one of the coolest Canadian indie-rock albums of all time".

== In popular culture ==
The album was briefly featured in the CBS sitcom How I Met Your Mother in the episode "Girls Versus Suits".

== Track listing ==
All tracks are written by the Unicorns.

No.	Title	Length
1.	"I Don't Wanna Die"	2:04
2.	"Tuff Ghost"	2:57
3.	"Ghost Mountain"	3:10
4.	"Sea Ghost"	3:43
5.	"Jellybones"	2:44
6.	"The Clap"	1:27
7.	"Child Star"	5:22
8.	"Let's Get Known"	1:57
9.	"I Was Born (A Unicorn)"	2:46
10.	"Tuff Luff"	4:19
11.	"Inoculate the Innocuous"	5:18
12.	"Les Os"	3:32
13.	"Ready to Die"	1:43
Total length:		41:03

== 2014 reissue ==
Who Will Cut Our Hair When We're Gone? was reissued on 26 August 2014 to coincide with the band's brief reunion tour, ten years after their initial split. It features new artwork and includes four bonus tracks which are all previously unreleased other than "Evacuate the Vacuous" which appeared on The Unicorns: 2014. "Rocket Ship" is a cover of a song by Daniel Johnston, which is rumoured to have been recorded for the 2004 tribute album The Late Great Daniel Johnston: Discovered Covered.

No.	Title	Length
14.	"Rocket Ship (Bonus Track)"	2:52
15.	"Let Me Sleep (Bonus Track)"	3:38
16.	"Evacuate the Vacuous (Bonus Track)"	3:22
17.	"Haunted House (Live) (Bonus Track)"	3:38

== Personnel ==
The Unicorns

- Nick "Neil Diamonds" Thorburn - vocals, drum machine, toy piano, toy organ, echoplex, guitars, tape, recorder, glockenspiel, accordion
- Alden "Ginger" Penner – vocals, drums, guitar, bass guitar, percussion, synthesizers
- Jaime "J'amie Tambeur" Thompson – drums (tracks 2, 5, 9, 11, 12)

Additional Musicsons

- Brendan Reed – vocals (track 9)
- Richard Reed Parry – trumpet (track 1), bowed bass (track 4); additional recording assistance
- Joellen Housego – violin (track 8), fiddle (track 10)
- Randy Peters – clarinet (track 8), penny whistle (track 10)
- Tim Kramer – cello (track 10)
- Maxime Pellisier – clarinet (track 7)
- Deanna Fong – vocals (track 12)

Technical

- Mark Lawson - Recording, mixing, produced
