= Reefer (band) =

- Origin: Maui County, Hawaii
- Genre: Alternative hip hop
- Years active: 2008-present
- Label: Alpha Pup Records
- Members: Nicholas Thorburn; Daddy Kev

Reefer is an alternative hip hop group based in Maui County, Hawaii. It consists of Nicholas Thorburn and Daddy Kev. The duo released the debut album, Reefer, on Alpha Pup Records in 2008. Their song, "May Baleen", was listed by Consequence of Sound as one of the Top 10 Subaquatic Tunes in 2009.

== History ==
The Islands frontman Nicholas Thorburn and Los Angeles hip hop producer Daddy Kev recorded the debut album, Reefer, in Maui County, Hawaii. It was released on Alpha Pup Records in 2008. It featured remixes from Dntel and Flying Lotus. Rebecca Raber of Pitchfork Media described the album as "Thorburn's best album of the year."

== Discography ==
- Reefer (2008)
