= Nicholas Thorburn =

Canadian musician (born 1981)

Nick Thorburn
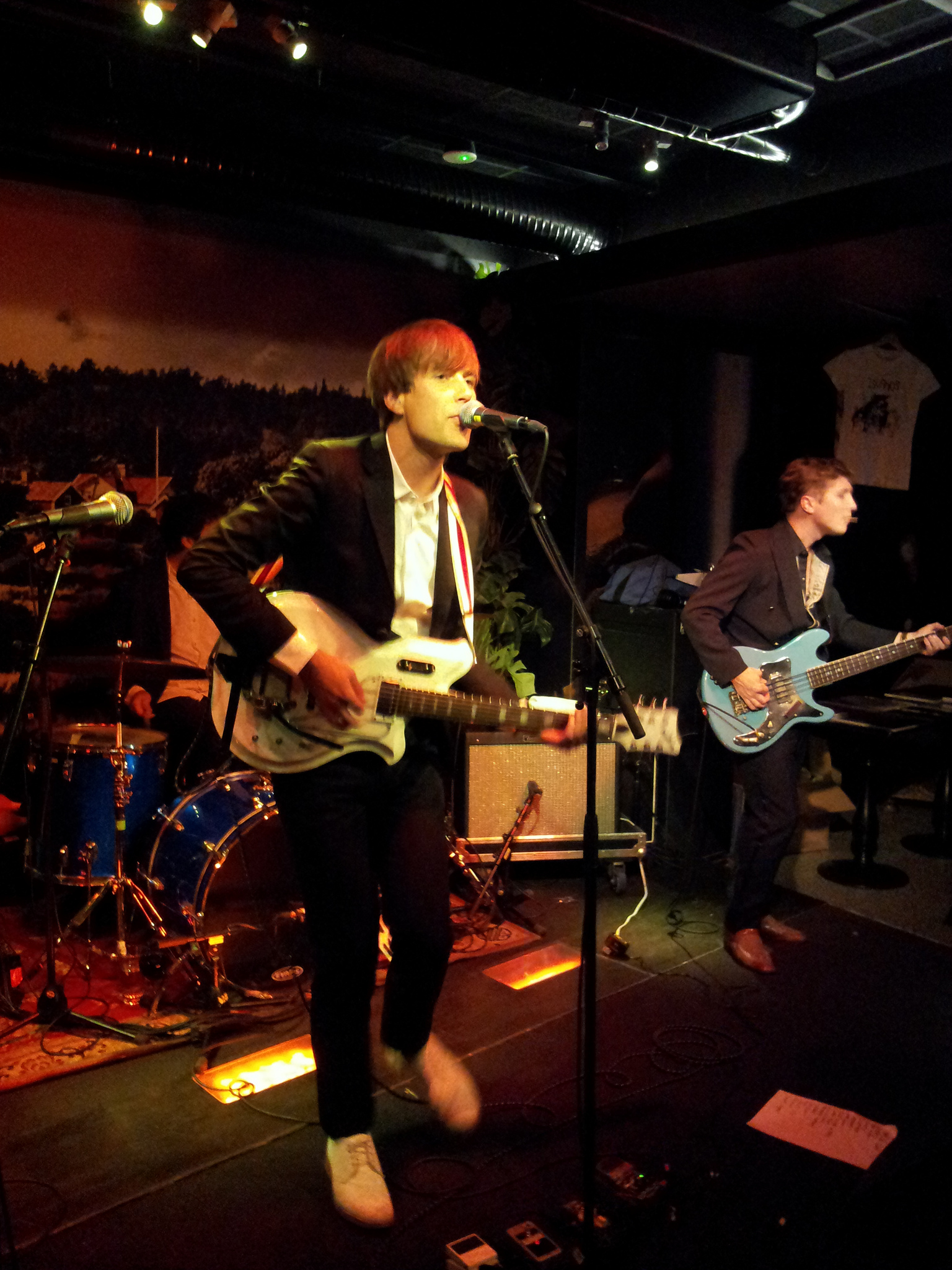
- Thorburn performing with Islands in Stockholm, 2012.

Background information
- Also known as: Nick Diamonds
- Born: Nick Thorburn; 27 November 1981 (age 44); Campbell River, British Columbia, Canada
- Genres: Indie rock; alternative rock; indie pop; lo-fi; electronica; alternative hip hop; hip hop; rock; art rock
- Occupations: Singer-songwriter; producer
- Instruments: Vocals; guitar; bass; keyboards; drums; drum machine; percussion; echoplex; recorder; glockenspiel; accordion
- Years active: 2002–present
- Labels: Rough Trade; ANTI-; Manqué

Nick Thorburn (born 27 November 1981), also known by his stage name Nick Diamonds, is a Canadian musician originally from Campbell River, British Columbia. He has fronted numerous bands such as The Unicorns, Th' Corn Gangg, Islands, Reefer, and Human Highway.

== History ==
Thorburn was born in 1981 in Campbell River, British Columbia, Canada, which he says has influenced his songwriting. Nature, in particular whales, are a subject of interest; his lyrics include references to rivers, swans and frogs. He also had a formative experience in a visit, along with his father, to see the killer whale Luna; his memories of the visit became an influential part of Islands' debut album Return to the Sea.

Thorburn has fronted The Unicorns, Th' Corn Gangg, Islands, Reefer, and Human Highway. Thorburn has gone by the stage name "Nick Diamonds."

His vocals have been noted as a distinguishing feature of The Unicorns and Islands. His production technique involves dark personification over enjoyable music, though he is "usually wary of composing dance tracks." This contrast is observed in his live performance as well.

In 2005, he co-wrote with Adam Gollner the satirical charity song "Do They Know It's Hallowe'en?" organizing the collaboration of many artists. He guest performed on Les Savy Fav's 2007 album Let's Stay Friends. Reefer, his collaborative album with producer Daddy Kev as Reefer, was released on Alpha Pup Records in 2008.

Thorburn has made an album with Honus Honus (also known as Ryan Kattner) of the band Man Man: "One thing that has been floated around is Honus Honus from Man Man and I making a record in a new (sub)genre we are developing, called Doom Wop, which is essentially low frequency, and extremely slowed down music atop traditional doo wop harmonies. Or something." The project, called Mister Heavenly, also involves drummer Joe Plummer of Modest Mouse and The Black Heart Procession and has had actor Michael Cera playing bass on the tour.

He released the solo album, I Am an Attic, on his Bandcamp page in 2011. Thorburn was featured on the 2012 El-P album Cancer 4 Cure, singing the chorus of the track "Stay Down". In 2014, Thorburn composed the theme music and score for the critically acclaimed podcast Serial. In 2015, he released a second solo album titled City of Quartz.

== Discography ==
=== Albums ===
- Unicorns Are People Too as The Unicorns (2003)
- Who Will Cut Our Hair When We're Gone? as The Unicorns (2003)
- Return to the Sea as Islands (2006)
- Arm's Way as Islands (2008)
- Reefer as Reefer (2008)
- Moody Motorcycle as Human Highway (2008)
- Vapours as Islands (2009)
- Out of Love as Mister Heavenly (2011)
- I Am an Attic solo album as Nick Diamonds (2011)
- A Sleep & a Forgetting as Islands (2012)
- Ski Mask as Islands (2013)
- Music from SERIAL (2014)
- City of Quartz as Nick Diamonds (2015)
- Should I Remain Here, At Sea? as Islands (2016)
- Taste as Islands (2016)
- Boxing the Moonlight as Mister Heavenly (2017)
- Islomania as Islands (2021)
- And That's Why Dolphins Lost Their Legs as Islands (2023)
- What Occurs as Islands (2024)
- A Taste of Cherry as The Creem (2026)

=== Guest appearances ===
- Busdriver – "Happy Insider" from Jhelli Beam (2009)
- Nocando – "You Got Some Nerve" from Jimmy the Lock (2010)
- Buck 65 – "Gee Whiz" from 20 Odd Years (2011)
- Fat Tony and Tom Cruz – "Bad Habits" from Double Dragon (2012)
- El-P – "Stay Down" from Cancer 4 Cure (2012)

== Filmography ==
Year	Title	Notes
2012	Only the Young	composer
2013	Everyday Is Like Sunday	actor
2013	Bitch	actor
2013	Drunk History	television series; extra
2014	Lennon or McCartney	in interview clip
2015	Diamond Tongues	actor
2015	That Dog	director, writer
2016	Golden Vanity	composer
2017	Sundowners	Nick; also composer
2019	The Ripper (Huluween short)	actor

== See also ==
- Music of Canada
- Canadian rock
- List of Canadian musicians
