= Arm's Way =

Studio album by Islands
- Released: May 20, 2008
- Recorded: April–May 2007
- Studios: Bear Creek, Woodinville, WA, and Mixart, Montreal, Canada
- Genre: Indie
- Length: 68:06
- Label: ANTI-
- Producers: Ryan Hadlock and Islands

Islands chronology
Return to the Sea (2006)	Arm's Way (2008)	Vapours (2009)

Professional ratings
Aggregate scores
Source	Rating
Metacritic	71/100
Review scores
Source	Rating
AllMusic	3/5 stars
Drowned in Sound	9/10
Pitchfork Media	6.2/10
PopMatters	6/10
Rolling Stone	3/5 stars
Spin	4/5 stars
Tiny Mix Tapes	4/5 stars

Arm's Way is the second studio album by Montreal-based indie rock band Islands. It was released on May 20, 2008, on CD and download. The album's title is a play on the words "harm's way". The album leaked online on April 11, 2008.

== Concept and production ==
Drummer Aaron Harris outlined the album's concept and the band's songwriting approach thus:

We took a different approach with this album in that the music is focused on the band members – there are not any special appearances. Arm's was conceived in Montreal, we wrote the songs in a room with old NOFX and Insane Clown Posse posters on the wall. As a band we put the music together and then singer Nick Thorburn wrote the lyrics.

== Music ==
The musical style of Arm's Way represents a departure from the Graceland-inspired sound of debut album Return to the Sea. Rebecca Raber of Pitchfork writes, "Gone are the guest rappers, the acoustic nuevo-country twang, and the sunny Afro-Caribbean flourishes ... In their place are theatrical string arrangements, layers of silvery, minor-key guitars, and lots of gothy synthesizers." Most lyrics include references to death and violence, themes which are shared with frontman Nick Thorburn's previous project The Unicorns.

== Track listing ==
No.	Title	Length
1.	"The Arm"	5:38
2.	"Pieces of You"	4:06
3.	"J'aime vous voir quitter"	3:23
4.	"Abominable Snow"	4:35
5.	"Creeper"	3:15
6.	"Kids Don't Know Shit"	5:11
7.	"Life in Jail"	5:27
8.	"In the Rushes" (contains a portion of "A Quick One While He's Away" by the Who)	7:00
9.	"We Swim"	5:06
10.	"To a Bond"	7:47
11.	"I Feel Evil Creeping In"	5:31
12.	"Vertigo (If It's a Crime)"	11:01

== Personnel ==
Adapted from AllMusic.

- Patrice Agbokou – bass
- Rebecca Bird – artwork
- Doug Boehm – mixing
- Greg Calbi – mastering
- Alex Chow – percussion, synthesizer, viola, violin
- Sebastian Chow – oboe, piano, violin, vocals
- Chris Constable – mixing assistant
- Corn Gangg – drum programming
- Steve Fallone – mastering
- Patrick Gregoire – bass clarinet, guitar
- Ryan Hadlock – engineer, producer
- Aaron Harris – drums, percussion, vocals
- Islands – arranger, primary artist, producer
- Mathieu Roberge – assistant engineer
- Rob Schnapf – mixing
- Nick Thorburn – guitar, vocals
- Alexander Wagner – photography
