= Mister Heavenly =

US musical group

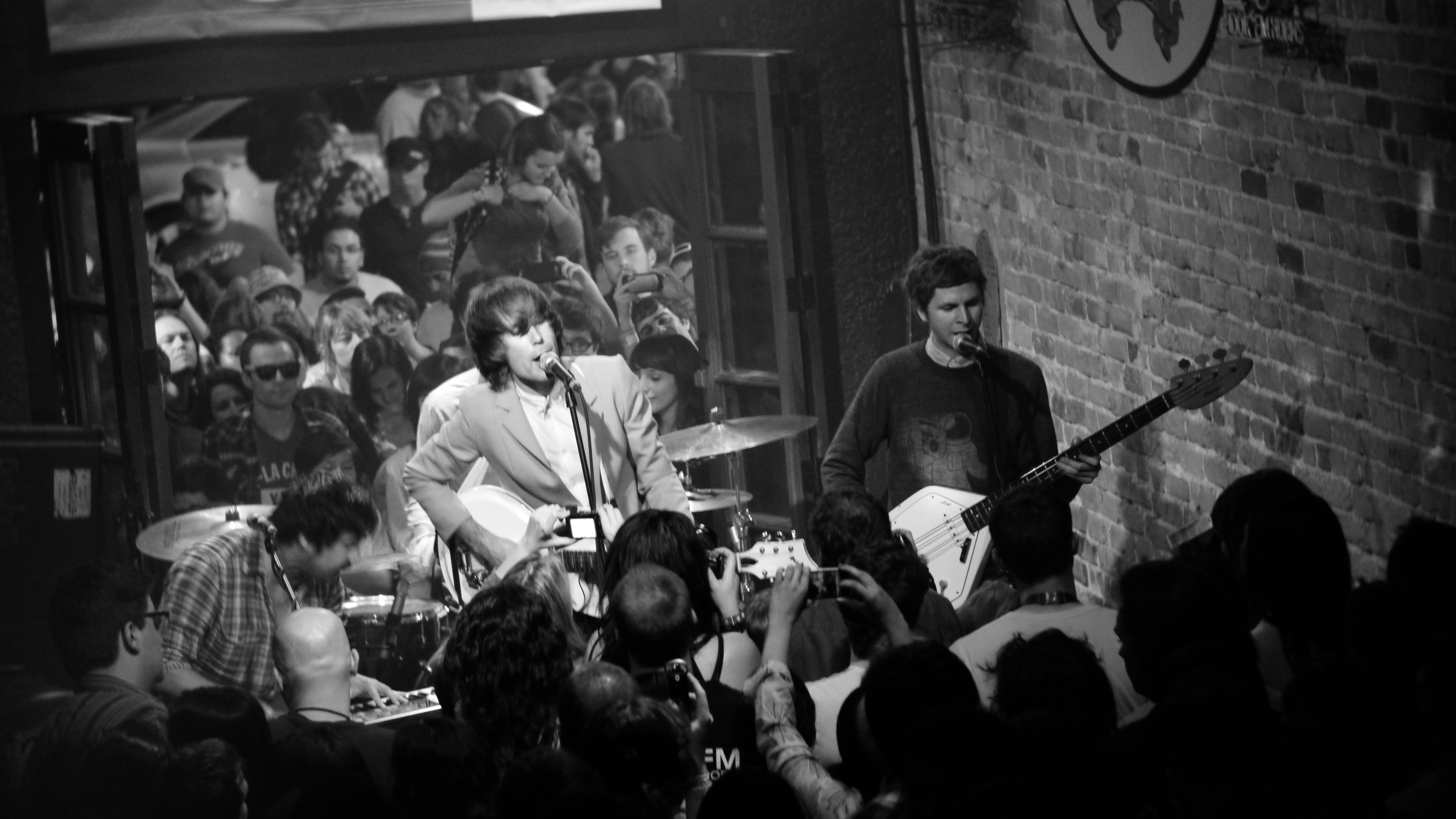

Background information
- Genres: Rock, indie rock
- Years active: 2010–present
- Labels: Polyvinyl Record Co., Sub Pop
- Members: Honus Honus; Nicholas Thorburn; Joe Plummer; Brett Morris
- Past members: Michael Cera

Mister Heavenly is an indie rock (Note: Thorburn has suggested that the band belongs to a new subgenre called "doom wop", consisting of slow, low-frequency music transposed with traditional doo wop harmonies.) supergroup consisting of Honus Honus of Man Man, Nicholas Thorburn of Islands and The Unicorns, and Joe Plummer of Modest Mouse and The Shins. They recorded their first album in late 2010, finishing the year with a string of tour dates supporting Passion Pit, joined by Michael Cera as their touring bassist. In January 2011, they released two songs, the eponymous "Mister Heavenly" and "Pineapple Girl". Their first album, Out of Love, was released August 16, 2011. On July 19, 2017, a brief "coming soon" video was posted on the official Mister Heavenly Facebook account teasing a new release. On July 26, 2017, their first single "Beat Down" from the new album titled Boxing the Moonlight was released on YouTube. The album was released October 2017.

Brett Morris, former guitarist of Man Man, and a producer and on-air talent for Earwolf and Comedy Bang Bang World, has been playing bass guitar with them as of the fall of 2017.

== Discography ==
- Out of Love (2011)
- Boxing the Moonlight (2017)
