= Burnt Oak Records =

Canadian independent record label

Burnt Oak Records was a Canadian independent collective and record label based in Guelph, Ontario and co-founded in 2005 by Brad MacInerny, Ryan Newell and Jia Qing Wilson-Yang. Known for a do-it -yourself approach to music and arts, the founding group lived and operated out of 127 Grange St. in Guelph. They hosted pay-what-you-can shows, recorded their own music, handmade album covers and booked their own tours.

By late 2007, the label had released 20 full-length albums and EPs by founding members as well as artists such as Richard Laviolette, Griffin Epstein, Slow Hand Motëm, Elbow Beach Surf Club and Green Go. Laviolette's "127 Grange" on his album A Little Less Like a Rock, A Little More Like Home was a nod to the collective. The album was released by Burnt Oak in 2006.
