= Jenny Omnichord =

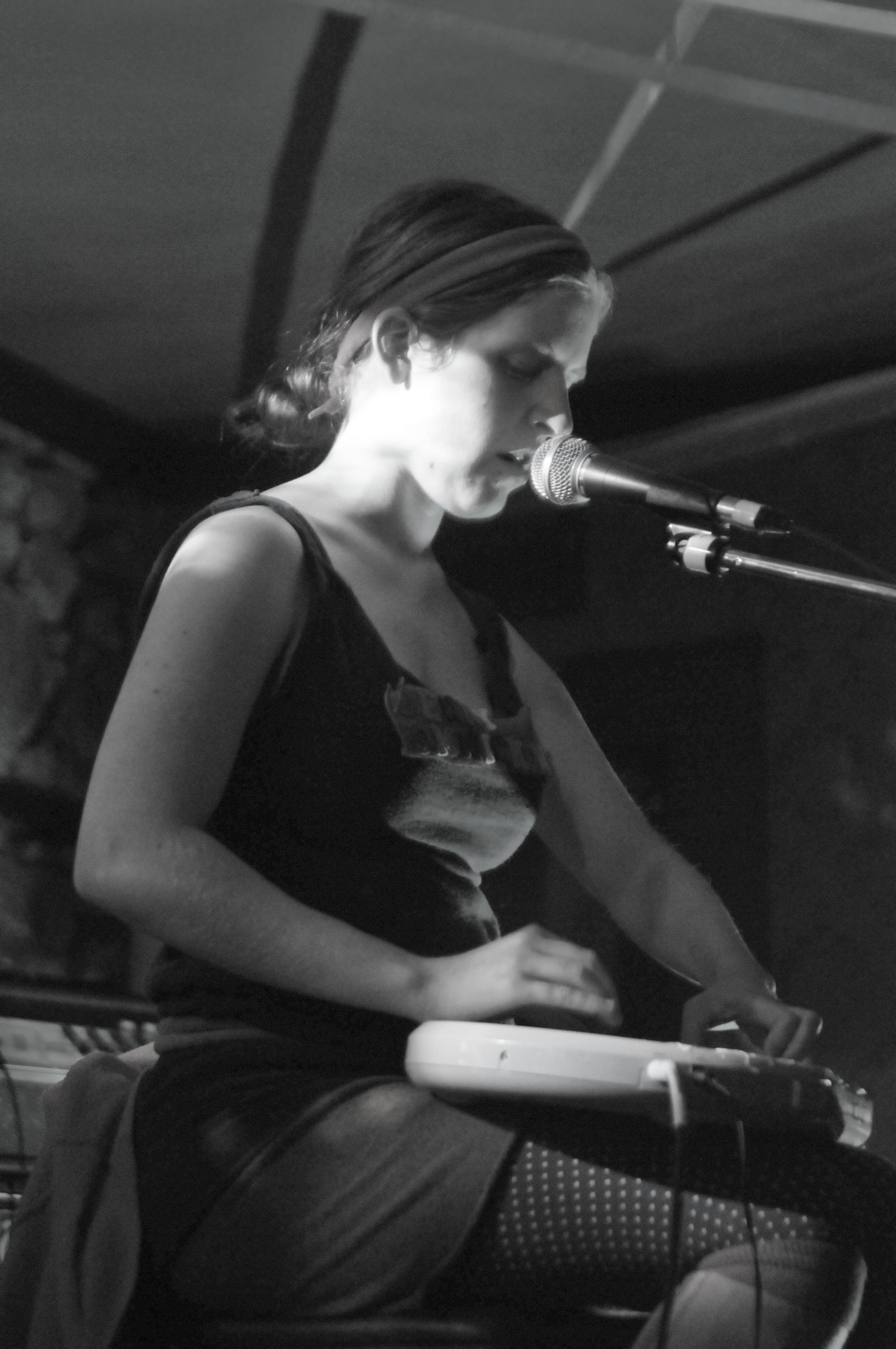
- Jenny Omnichord, January 2009

Background information
- Born: Jenny Mitchell
- Occupation: Musician
- Instrument: Omnichord
- Labels: Weewerk, Out of This Spark

Jenny Mitchell, better known by the stage name Jenny Omnichord, is a Canadian indie rock musician. She has released three solo albums and an EP as a solo artist, and also records and performs with the bands The Barmitzvah Brothers and The Burning Hell.

On Cities of Gifts and Ghosts, Mitchell worked with a variety of influential Canadian record producers, including Don Kerr, Evan Gordon, Jim Guthrie, Bob Wiseman, Scott Merritt and Dave Clark. Collaborators on Charlotte or Otis: Duets for Children, Their Parents and Other People Too, her 2008 children's album, included Andy Magoffin, Wax Mannequin, Shad, Kim Barlow, Ida Nilsen, Old Man Luedecke and Tony Dekker of Great Lake Swimmers.

Her 2010 album, All Our Little Bones was her first to feature a full band, including JJ Ipsen, Michael Brushey, Justin Nace, Michael Barclay, Paterson Hodgson, Andy Magoffin and former Barmitzvah Brothers bandmates Johnny Merritt, TJ O'Malley and Gillian Manford.

She is also known for distributing her albums in unconventional packaging. Cities of Gifts and Ghosts was released in handmade wooden cases, Charlotte or Otis featured a 20-page booklet of artwork inspired by the album's songs, and the vinyl edition of All Our Little Bones was released in a jacket which folds out into a playable board game inspired by a cross-Canada concert tour.

== Discography ==
- Jenny Omnicovers (2007)
- Cities of Gifts and Ghosts (2007)
- Pregnancy 'P (2008)
- Charlotte or Otis: Duets for Children, Their Parents and Other People Too (2008)
- All Our Little Bones (2010)
- Days of Hard Drives: Excavating Ten Years of Jenny Omnichord (2013)
