= Jia Qing Wilson-Yang =

Canadian writer and musician

- Education: York University
- Writing career
- Language: English
- Notable work: Small Beauty
- Notable awards: Dayne Ogilvie Prize

Jia Qing Wilson-Yang is a Canadian writer and musician. Her debut novel Small Beauty was published in 2016.

Wilson-Yang was a member of the Guelph-based Burnt Oak collective and record label. She co-founded the group in 2005 with Ryan Newell and Brad MacInerny. In 2007, she released May All Yr Children Be Dragons, which featured songs written while living in Beijing learning Mandarin. The same year, she released the split EP Hands and Feats with Burnt Oak member Richard Laviolette. They supported the release with a seven-week tour of the United States and Canada.

Wilson-Yang was awarded an honour of distinction from the Dayne Ogilvie Prize in 2016, and won the Lambda Literary Award for Transgender Fiction at the 29th Lambda Literary Awards in 2017. Her writing has also appeared in the anthologies Bound to Struggle: Where Kink and Radical Politics Meet and Letters Lived: Radical Reflections, Revolutionary Paths, and in the literary magazine Room.

== Discography ==
- may all yr children be dragons (2007)
- Hands and Feats (with Richard Laviolette) (2007)
- changes of state (2008)
- Eleven Songs (2009)
- eight steps in the recent moves of (2013)
