= Taste (Islands album) =

Studio album by Islands
- Released: May 13, 2016
- Genre: Indie rock
- Length: 42:48
- Label: Manqué Music

Islands chronology
Should I Remain Here, At Sea? (2016)	Taste (2016)

Professional ratings
Aggregate scores
Source	Rating
Metacritic	72/100
Review scores
Source	Rating
Under the Radar	8/10 stars
Exclaim!	7/10 stars
AllMusic	3.5/5 stars
Consequence of Sound	B−
Pitchfork	7.7/10

Taste is the seventh studio album by Montreal-based indie rock band Islands. It was released on May 13, 2016.

== Track listing ==
No.	Title	Length
1.	"Charm Offensive"	4:27
2.	"Pumpkin"	3:02
3.	"No Milk, No Sugar"	3:44
4.	"Carried Away"	3:02
5.	"It's Heaven"	4:27
6.	"Outspoken Dirtbiker"	3:44
7.	"Snowflake"	3:05
8.	"Cool Intentions"	2:49
9.	"The Joke"	4:13
10.	"Umbrellas"	3:18
11.	"The Weekend"	3:33
12.	"Whisper"	3:24
