= Return to the Sea =

Studio album by Islands
- Released: 4 April 2006
- Genres: Indie rock, indie pop
- Length: 55:45
- Label: Equator Records
- Producer: Islands • Mark Lawson

Islands chronology
Return to the Sea (2006)	Arm's Way (2008)

Singles from Return to the Sea
- 1. "Rough Gem" Released: 10 April 2006

Return to the Sea is the first studio album by Islands. It was released by Equator Records on 4 April 2006. "Rough Gem" was released as a single from the album. The remastered version of the album was released on 11 November 2016.

== Critical reception ==
Professional ratings
Aggregate scores
Source	Rating
Metacritic	80/100
Review scores
Source	Rating
AllMusic	4/5 stars
The A.V. Club	B+
Cokemachineglow	80/100
Now	3/5
Pitchfork	8.4/10
PopMatters	8/10 stars
Prefix	8.0/10
Stylus Magazine	B

At Metacritic, which assigns a weighted average score out of 100 to reviews from mainstream critics, the album received an average score of 80 based on 18 reviews, indicating "generally favorable reviews".

Tim Sendra of AllMusic gave the album 4 stars out of 5, saying: "On their debut record, Return to the Sea, Montreal's Islands have crafted a rich, exciting, and emotionally deep sounding album that carries on the freewheeling spirit and sound of the Unicorns as well as that of the Elephant 6 bands of the late '90s." John Motley of Pitchfork gave the album an 8.4 out of 10, calling it "a sprawling, gorgeous collection of pop songs that draws from disparate sources such as calypso, country, and hip-hop."

No Ripchord placed it at number 10 on the "Top 50 Albums of 2006" list.

== Track listing ==
No.	Title	Length
1.	"Swans (Life After Death)"	9:31
2.	"Humans"	4:58
3.	"Don't Call Me Whitney, Bobby"	2:31
4.	"Rough Gem"	3:36
5.	"Tsuxiit"	3:05
6.	"Where There's a Will There's a Whalebone"	3:56
7.	"Jogging Gorgeous Summer"	2:48
8.	"Volcanoes"	5:26
9.	"If"	4:31
10.	"Ones"	5:40
11.	"Renaud" (hidden track)	16:20/9:38

== Personnel ==
Credits adapted from liner notes.

Musicians

- Nick Diamonds – vocals (1, 2, 3, 4, 6, 7, 8, 9, 10), guitar (1, 3, 4, 7, 8, 10), clavinet (2), organ (5, 7, 9), synthesizer (5, 6)
- J'aime Tambeur – drums (1, 2, 3, 4, 5, 6, 8, 9, 10), percussion (3, 4, 7, 8), drum machine (7)
- Patrice Agbokou – bass guitar (1, 3, 4, 7)
- Spencer Krug – piano (1), synthesizer (1)
- Dan Boeckner – guitar (1, 6)
- Jim Guthrie – guitar (1)
- Tim Kingsbury – bass guitar (1)
- Regine Chassagne – accordion (2), piano (2, 5), steel drums (7), recorder (7)
- Richard Reed Parry – double bass (2, 5, 9, 10), background vocals (6), fiddle (8)
- Mauricio Lobos – charango (2, 5)
- Becky Foon – cello (2, 5, 8)
- Sarah Neufeld – violin (2, 5, 8)
- Pietro Amato – French horn (2, 10)
- Frank Lozano – bass clarinet (2, 8, 9), flute (5)
- Busdriver – vocals (6)
- Subtitle – vocals (6)
- Steve McDonald – bass guitar (6)
- Kaveh Nabatien – cuica (7), trumpet (9)
- Michael Feuerstack – lap steel guitar (8)

Technical personnel

- Islands – production, mixing
- Mark Lawson – production, engineering, mixing
- Steve Major – mixing assistance
- Nilesh Patel – mastering
- Nick Diamonds – string/horn/reed arrangement, layout
- Jamie Thompson – reed arrangement
- Richard Reed Parry – string/horn/reed arrangement
- Sarah Neufeld – string/horn/reed arrangement
- Pietro Amato – string/horn/reed arrangement
- Frank Lozano – string/horn/reed arrangement
- Patrick Francis Guay – layout
- Caspar David Friedrich – cover painting (The Sea of Ice)
