= Elbow Beach Surf Club =

Canadian musical group

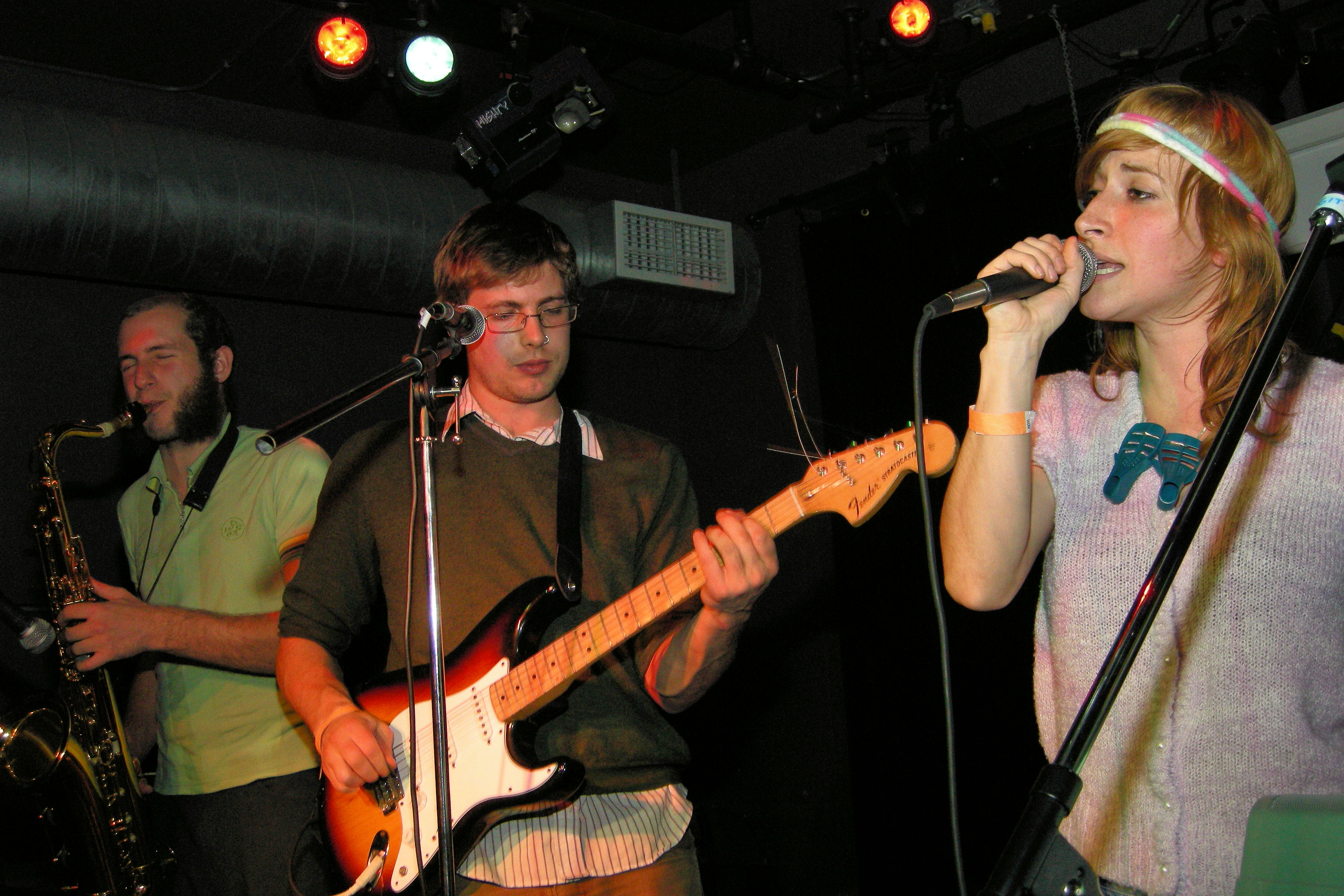
- Elbow Beach Surf Club, November 2007

Background information
- Also known as: Elbow Beach, EBSC
- Origin: Guelph, Ontario, Canada
- Genres: Indie rock, Surf rock
- Years active: 2006–2008
- Label: Burnt Oak Records
- Past members: Michelle Doucette; Lindsay Roe; Kevin Barnhorst; Kirsten Palm; Brad McInerney; Dave Bazinet
- Website: www.myspace.com/elbowbeach

Elbow Beach Surf Club was an indie rock band from Guelph, Ontario, Canada.

== History ==
The band was formed by Michelle Doucette, Lindsay Roe, and Kevin Barnhorst in the summer of 2006, following several jam sessions Roe and Barnhorst had held in the backyard of the "Grange House"; at that time the place of operation for Guelph's Burnt Oak Records. Fueled by the musical activity around them, the band finalized its roster by the end of the summer and began playing shows, with Doucette departing the group to pursue other projects, and Kirsten Palm, Brad McInerney, and Dave Bazinet entering into the fold.

Elbow Beach's initial performances were well-received, and witnessed the group's tacit blending of both surf and indie rock. Enthused by this success, the group released its first self-titled EP Elbow Beach Surf Club 14 February 2007 on Burnt Oak Records. On this release, Helen Spitzer of Eye Weekly and Brave New Waves stated:

...This debut EP rushes forth under the momentum of the three opening tracks: the red-hot economy of opening salvo "Surf Theme"; the sweet melodicism of "The Letter" (folding the tartness of SS Cardiacs into Republic of Safety's crunchy centre); and the sweet, skronky sax on "The Waltz" that might remind certain old-timers of '80s Can-rockers Condition. The ground EBSC cover on the remaining 10 minutes shows they're no one-trick pony, though you can't help but hope they'll kick out a few more short, sharp and instantly gratifying hooks. Instead, you make do with the group channelling J. Geils Band's "Freeze Frame" and make your own plans for the beach. A quick and tasty morsel that more than proves they have the necessary chops.

Following the release of Surf Club, Elbow Beach played a handful of shows in support of it, earning them broader exposure than they had previously enjoyed, and culminating in a performance at Pop Montreal alongside their Burnt Oak labelmates. Their sound also began to diversify as a seeming result of their improved chemistry, taking on a more visceral and experimental quality, and embracing previously unexplored musical genres. This was acknowledged in Sarah Liss' November review of their 29 October 2007 Burnt Oak Records follow-up EP Billy Club:

Don't be thrown off by their far-out Sex-Wax-a-delic name, or by the snarly tangle of echoing reverb guitars that ride the wave of the Billy Club EP's lead track "Turf Dream"—Guelph's Elbow Beach Surf Club are definitely not the Southern Ontario answer to The Surfaris, or even The Ventures. Rather, the energetic collective take a handful of standard genres that could fall under the indie-rock umbrella—post-punk, math-rock, garage-pop—and devote themselves to experimenting with style and texture, adding layers of scratchy distortion to muted femme vocals, burying subtle sax (courtesy of satellite Republic of Safety member Martin Eckart) at the bottom of the mix and smashing together contrasting guitar tones. The songs here occasionally threaten to blow apart at their seams; not coincidentally, some of Billy Club's best moments come when the group comes together in choral harmonies, as on "No Volume" and "The Nest".

In September 2008, after a lengthy hiatus due to an injury incurred by drummer Dave Bazinet, Elbow Beach Surf Club broke up. Following the band's dissolution, several of EBSC's former members discussed publicly the possibility of reuniting as "Billy Club", a new group named after the eponymous album and reprising the band's final line-up minus Roe; however, this did not happen.

== Members ==
Former members of the band include:

- Lindsay Roe – vocals
- Kevin Barnhorst – guitar, bass, vocals
- Kirsten Palm – keyboards, backing vocals
- Brad McInerney – bass, guitar, backing vocals
- Dave Bazinet – drums, backing vocals
- Michelle Doucette – percussion

== Discography ==
=== EPs ===
- Elbow Beach Surf Club (2007)
- Billy Club (2007)

== See also ==
- Music of Canada
- Canadian rock
- List of Canadian musicians
- List of bands from Canada
- Category:Canadian musical groups
