= Should I Remain Here, At Sea? =

Studio album by Islands
- Released: May 13, 2016
- Genre: Indie rock
- Length: 29:59
- Label: Manqué Music

Islands chronology
Ski Mask (2013)	Should I Remain Here, At Sea? (2016)	Taste (2016)

Professional ratings
Aggregate scores
Source	Rating
Metacritic	76/100
Review scores
Source	Rating
AllMusic	3.5/5 stars
Exclaim!	8/10 stars
Consequence of Sound	B−
Pitchfork	7.4/10
Under the Radar	8/10 stars

Should I Remain Here, At Sea? is the sixth studio album by Montreal-based indie rock band Islands. It was released on May 13, 2016.

== Track listing ==
No.	Title	Length
1.	"Back Into It"	3:20
2.	"Fear"	4:00
3.	"Fiction"	1:48
4.	"Stop Me Now"	2:15
5.	"Innocent Man"	1:33
6.	"Christmas Tree"	2:30
7.	"Sun Conure"	2:56
8.	"Right to be Misbegotten"	3:47
9.	"Hawaii"	3:27
10.	"At Sea"	4:23
