= Out of Love (album) =

Studio album by Mister Heavenly
- Released: August 16, 2011
- Genres: Indie rock, doo-wop
- Length: 36:10
- Label: Sub Pop

Professional ratings
Review scores
Source	Rating
PopMatters	7/10
Pitchfork	7.5/10
The A.V. Club	C+
The Guardian	2/5 stars
Paste	8/10

Out of Love is the debut studio album of indie rock supergroup Mister Heavenly. It was released on August 16, 2011 on the record label Sub Pop.

== Track listing ==
No.	Title	Length
1.	"Bronx Sniper"	3:39
2.	"I Am a Hologram"	2:36
3.	"Charlyne"	2:25
4.	"Mister Heavenly"	3:06
5.	"Harm You"	3:41
6.	"Reggae Pie"	5:29
7.	"Pineapple Girl"	2:20
8.	"Diddy Eyes"	3:49
9.	"Hold My Hand"	2:50
10.	"Doom Wop"	1:38
11.	"Your Girl"	2:27
12.	"Wise Men"	2:19
