= Islands (band) =

Canadian indie rock band

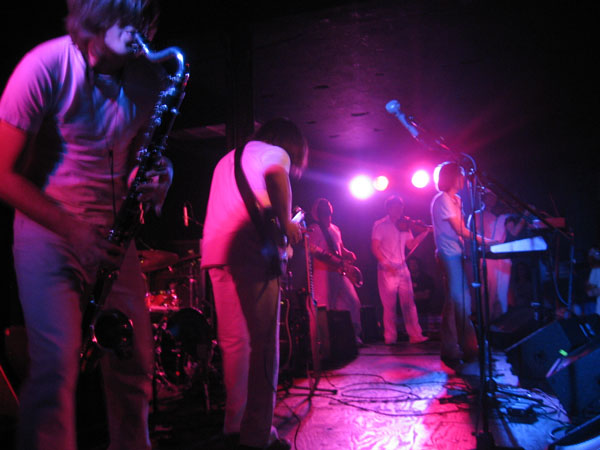

Background information
- Origin: Montreal, Quebec, Canada
- Genres: Indie rock; indie pop; art rock
- Years active: 2005–2016, 2021–present
- Labels: Anti-; Rough Trade; Tomlab; Manqué
- Members: Nicholas Thorburn; Evan Gordon; Geordie Gordon; Adam Halferty
- Past members: Jim Guthrie; Aaron Harris; Kate Perkins; Mike Feuerstack; Jamie Thompson; Patrice Agbokou; Patrick Gregoire; Sebastian Chow; Alexander Chow; Luc Laurent
- Website: islandsareforever.com

Islands is a Canadian indie rock band from Montreal, Quebec. The group was founded in 2005 by Nicholas Thorburn and Jamie Thompson, shortly after the breakup of The Unicorns, of which both were members. Their current lineup includes Thorburn, often known by his stage name Nick Diamonds, along with brothers Evan Gordon and Geordie Gordon, and Adam Halferty. The band has released 10 studio albums, with their 10th album, What Occurs, released on June 21, 2024.

== History ==
=== Formation and Return to the Sea (2005–2006) ===
Following the abrupt breakup of The Unicorns in 2004, members Nicholas Thorburn and Jamie Thompson simultaneously formed Islands and hip-hop group Th' Corn Gangg, and recorded Islands' debut album, Return to the Sea, during 2005. The album was recorded at Breakglass Studio and Thompson's bedroom in Montreal, Canada, and was produced by audio engineer/record producer Mark Lawson.

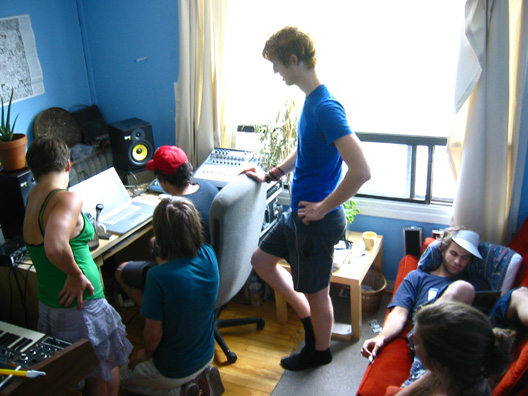
Islands mixing debut album Return to the Sea in Jamie's bedroom. Left to Right: Sarah Neufeld (violin, Arcade Fire), Nick Diamonds (Islands), Mark Lawson (audio engineer), Richard Parry (upright bass, Arcade Fire), Jamie Thompson (Islands), Becky Foon (cello, A Silver Mt. Zion and Esmerine).

Return to the Sea was re-mastered in England for the European version of the album, and was released there by Rough Trade Records on April 3, 2006. In North America, the album was released on the upstart label Equator Records on April 4, 2006. The cover of the album is a painting by Caspar David Friedrich titled The Wreck of the Hope. The album features numerous guest appearances, including members of Arcade Fire and Wolf Parade.

The band played various shows around the US and Canada throughout mid-late 2005, followed by an opening slot for Metric on their early 2006 tour. After Return to the Sea was released in April 2006, the band embarked on their first full headlining tour, playing small clubs around the US and Canada throughout May. They were joined by Cadence Weapon and Why? on the first half of the tour, and Cadence Weapon and Busdriver on the second. The band generally received critical acclaim for their live shows, which sometimes ended with the band leading the audience out of the venue "pied piper style" and onto the surrounding streets.

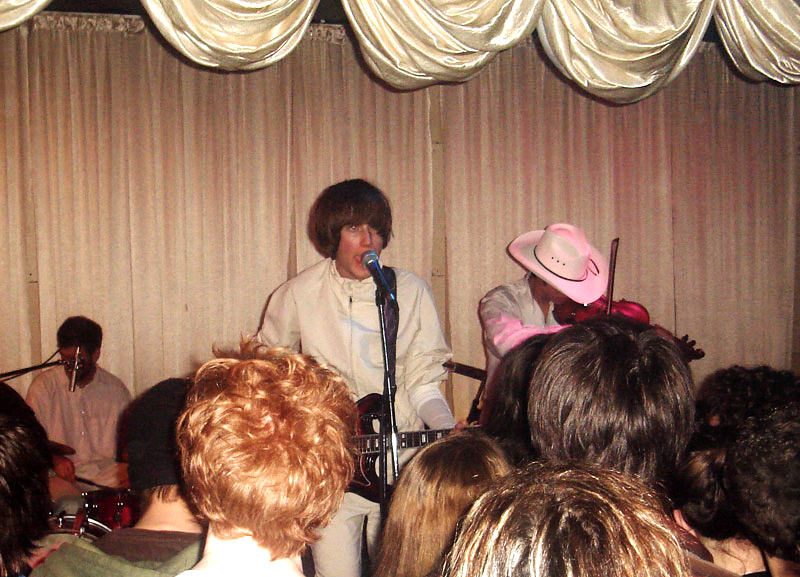
Islands playing at Club Lambi in Montreal in February 2006

On May 28, 2006, it was announced that Thompson was leaving the band. Islands decided to continue on without Thompson, and a European tour was scheduled, and further recordings confirmed. The band later emerged the following month for two surprise appearances in Montreal, performing with a new lineup including new drummer Aaron Harris and multi-instrumentalist Kate Perkins, before departing for Europe the following week.

=== Arm's Way, new lineup, and Vapours (2007–2009) ===
During subsequent tour dates in Iceland, the United States, Canada and the United Kingdom, the band premiered several new songs which appeared on their second album, Arm's Way, which was released on Los Angeles-based ANTI- Records on May 20, 2008.

On June 19, 2009, it was announced that the entire band except for Thorburn had left the group. The new lineup included brothers Evan and Geordie Gordon, and a returning Thompson. Islands' third album, Vapours, was released September 22, 2009, on ANTI-. The band extensively toured the record in North America with Jemina Pearl and Toro Y Moi. During the spring of 2010, Islands toured Europe, playing shows in Northern and Western Europe throughout March and April.

In an interview with Exclaim!, Nick Thorburn explained that the overhauled lineup was a product of his desire to try new things. "That's important to me―to be able to constantly try new things. That's why this record's largely informed by electronic stuff like drum machines, sequencing, and programming, which really scales it back from the last record." Thompson once again left the band prior to the summer 2010 tour, and was again replaced by Aaron Harris.

=== A Sleep & A Forgetting and Ski Mask (2010–2014) ===
Following Vapours' release, Thorburn formed the band Mister Heavenly with Man Man's Honus Honus and Modest Mouse's Joe Plummer. The trio released their debut album, Out of Love, on Sub Pop Records in 2011.

On October 25, 2011, ANTI- announced Islands' fourth record, A Sleep & a Forgetting, which was released February 14, 2012. In a statement, Thorburn explained, "I left New York after the end of a relationship and came to Los Angeles. There was a piano where I was staying and that's where I wrote these songs. This record deals with loss, with memory and forgetting and with dreaming. I started writing it on Valentine's Day and it's coming out on Valentine's Day." Drums on the record were played by Luc Laurent, who officially joined the band in November 2011 after his band Pepper Rabbit broke up. The song "Hallways" from the album was featured in a commercial for Dell and the Microsoft Surface tablet.

On July 9, 2013, Thorburn revealed Ski Mask, Islands' fifth record, and the first with new drummer Adam Halferty. That same day, the band premiered the lead single, "Wave Forms". The album was released on September 17, 2013, followed by a number of tours across the US, Canada, and Europe, including an appearance at Primavera Sound Fest in Barcelona.

=== Should I Remain Here, At Sea? and Taste (2015–2016) ===
During the summer of 2015, Islands simultaneously recorded two records: Should I Remain Here, At Sea?, a spiritual successor to the band's debut album, Return to the Sea, and Taste, a "more electronic" album "buoyed by drum machines, programming and vintage synths." The albums were released on May 13, 2016, via the band's own Manqué label, reaching #21 and #23 on the Billboard Heatseeker charts, respectively.

=== Islomania (2016–2023) ===
After the dual release in 2016 and the subsequent tour, the band was largely inactive for a few years, without any touring or new music. Thorburn has stated in interviews that he quit the band in 2016, but returned to it after writing new music that he felt was "for Islands only." The new album Islomania was announced on March 3, 2021, and released on June 11, 2021.

=== And That's Why Dolphins Lost Their Legs (2023–present) ===
In the summer of 2023, Islands announced a new album, And That's Why Dolphins Lost Their Legs. Alongside this reveal, the first track from the album, "Life's a Joke", was released, along with an announcement for a North American tour for the fall of 2023.

== Members ==
=== Current ===
- Evan Gordon
- Geordie Gordon
- Adam Halferty
- Nicholas Thorburn

=== Former ===
- Aaron Harris
- Patrice Agbokou
- Sebastian Chow
- Alexander Chow
- Michael Feuerstack
- Patrick Gregoire
- Jim Guthrie
- Kate Perkins
- Jamie Thompson

== Discography ==
=== Studio albums ===
Year	Details	Peak chart positions		
Year	Details	US	US Indie	US Heat
2006	Return to the Sea: Released: April 4, 2006; Label: Equator Records, Rough Trade Records	—	—	—
2008	Arm's Way: Released: May 20, 2008; Label: ANTI-	200	27	10
2009	Vapours: Released: September 22, 2009; Label: ANTI-	—	—	35
2012	A Sleep & a Forgetting: Released: February 10, 2012; Label: ANTI-	—	—	14
2013	Ski Mask: Released: September 17, 2013; Label: Manqué Music	—	—	48
2016	Should I Remain Here, At Sea?: Released: May 13, 2016; Label: Manqué Music	—	—	21
2016	Taste: Released: May 13, 2016; Label: Manqué Music	—	—	23
2021	Islomania: Release date: June 11, 2021; Label: Royal Mountain Records	—	—	—
2023	And That's Why Dolphins Lost Their Legs: Release date: August 25, 2023; Label: ELF	—	—	—
2024	What Occurs: Release date: June 21, 2024; Label: ELF	—	—	—

=== Singles ===
Year	Song	Album
2006	"Rough Gem"	Return to the Sea
2006	"Don't Call Me Whitney, Bobby"	Return to the Sea
2007	"Dnttakemy Wingzz Away"	Tomlab Alphabet Series -S-
2008	"The Arm"	Arm's Way

== See also ==
- Music of Canada
- Music of Quebec
- Canadian rock
- List of Canadian musicians
- List of bands from Canada
