= Geordie Gordon =

Canadian musician and music producer

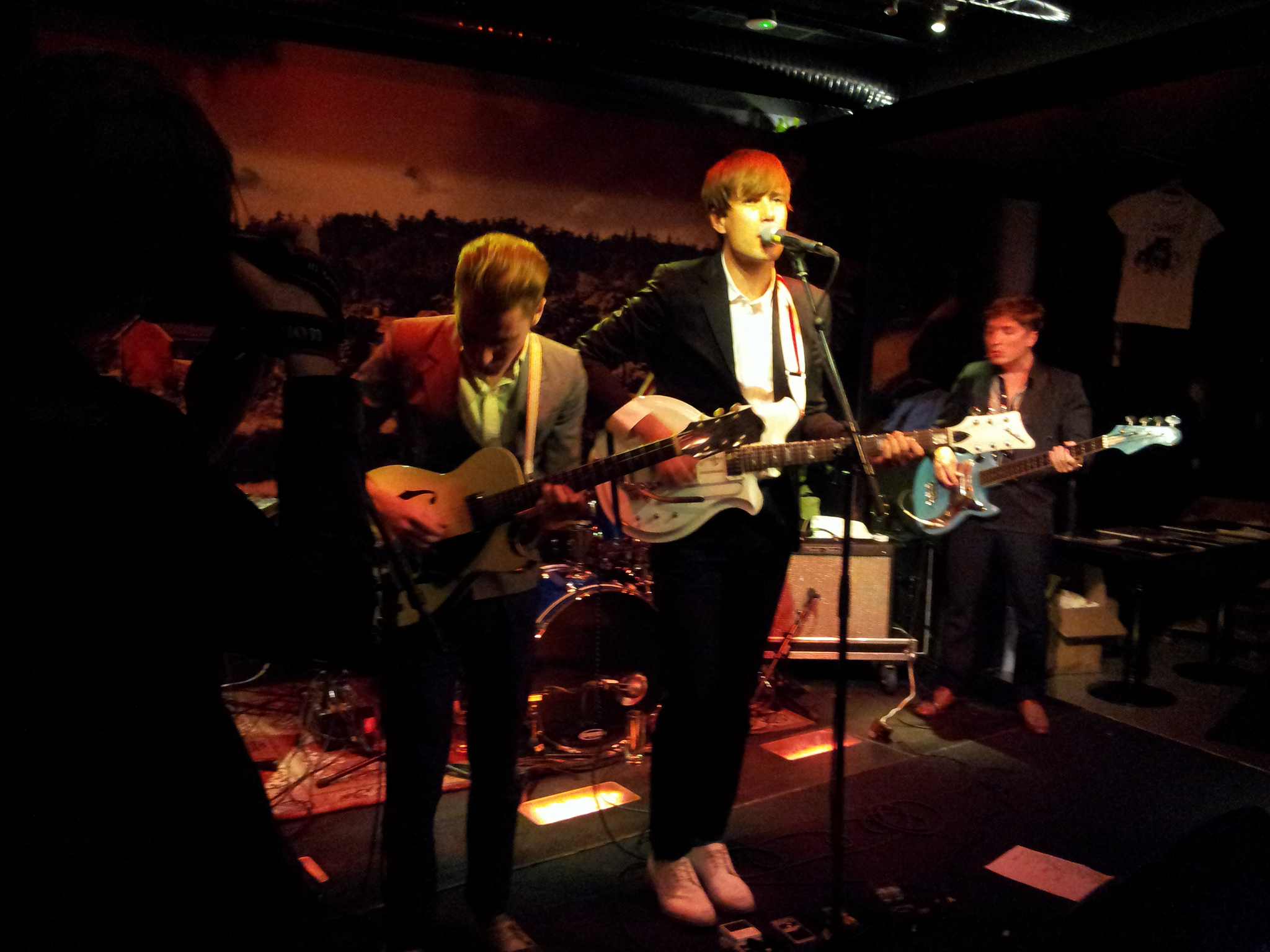
- Gordon (left) performing with Islands' Nicholas Thorburn and Evan Gordon in 2012.

Background information
- Born: Guelph, Ontario, Canada
- Member of: Islands
- Formerly of: The Bartmizvah Brothers, The Magic
- Website: www.geordiegordon.com

Geordie Gordon is a Canadian musician and music producer known for performing alone and as part of musical acts including Islands, U.S. Girls, the Magic, and the Barmitzvah Brothers.

Gordon was born and raised in Guelph, Ontario, Canada. His father is singer-songwriter James Gordon and he is the brother of multi-instrumentalist Evan Gordon. While still in high school, Gordon, along with Jenny Mitchell and John Merritt, formed the Barmitzvah Brothers. The group released several albums and played shows with Final Fantasy, Arcade Fire, and the Burning Hell.

Having previously performed together including as the recording and touring band for Islands, Gordan and brother Evan collaborated together for the first time as the Magic. In a review of their 2012 album Ragged Gold, Paul Lester, writing for The Guardian, said that the "album may be called 'Ragged Gold' but there's nothing rough or ramshackle about it: every note is in place, and you can see your reflection in the shiny surfaces." The album featured Sylvie Smith on backing vocals and Aaron Curtis on drums. The band's second album Nightfalling was released in 2016.

In 2021, Gordon released The Tower under his own name. The album was recorded after an intended months-long tour with U.S. Girls was due to the onset of the COVID-19 pandemic. Gordon wrote, recorded and mixed the album himself.

In February 2026, Gordon announced his third album, River Round, set to release on May 1, 2026.

In addition to producing his own music and performing with Islands and U.S Girls, Gordon has performed with numerous other acts including Andy Shauf, Diamond Rings, and the Weather Station. In 2010, he also recorded and performed as part of Richard Laviolette's seven-piece backing band the Oil Spills.
