= Annie (given name) =

- Pronunciation: /ˈæni/
- Gender: Feminine

Other names
- See also: Anne, Ann

Annie is a feminine given name. It is often short for other names, such as Anna, Annette, Anita, Andrea, Angela, Anastasia, or Anniken. It may refer to:

== People ==
=== A ===
- Annie Heloise Abel (1873–1947), American historian
- Annie Abrahams (born 1954), Dutch artist
- Annie Abram, British historian
- Annie Ackerman (1914–1989), American political activist
- Annie Adams (music hall) (1843–1905), English singer
- Annie Adams (1848–1916), American actresses
- Annie M. Aggens, American writer
- Annie Åkerhielm (1869–1956), Swedish writer and journalist
- Annie Charlotte Catharine Aldrich (1842–1916), British novelist who published under the name Catharine Childar
- Annie Alexander, multiple people
- Annie Alizé (born 1955), French sprinter
- Annie Altschul (1919–2001), British mental health nurse and professor
- Annie Andrews, multiple people
- Annie Antón, American computer scientist
- Annie Antone, Native American Tohomo O'Odham basket weaver
- Annie Anzieu (1924–2019), French psychoanalyst
- Annie Armitt (1850–1933), English writer and poet
- Annie Armstrong (1850–1938), American lay Southern Baptist denominational leader
- Annie Armstrong (politician), Irish republican politician
- Annie Arniel (1873–1924), American suffragist
- Annie Atkins, Welsh graphic designer
- Annie Au (born 1989), Hong Kong squash player
- Annie Aves (1887–1938), New Zealand abortion provider

=== B ===
- Annie Baillargeon, Canadian artist
- Annie Laurie Adams Baird (1864–1916), American missionary
- Annie Baker (born 1981), American playwright and teacher
- Annie Barnes, multiple people
  - Annie Barnes (1886–1982), British-Italian socialist and suffragist
- Annie Gardner Barr (1864–1921), Canadian artist and social reformer
- Annie Barrows, American editor and author
- Annie Latham Bartlett (1865–1948), American sculptor
- Annie Basil, Iranian-Indian activist
- Annie Noëlle Bahounoui Batende, Cameroonian magistrate
- Annie Maude Norton Battelle (1865–1925), American suffragette and philanthropist
- Annie White Baxter (1864–1944), American politician
- Annie Bélis, French archaeologist, philologist, papyrologist and musician
- Annie Belle (1956–2024), French actress and social worker
- Annie Bellemare (born 1980), Canadian figure skater
- Annie Bendolph, American artist
- Annie Bergman (1889–1987), Swedish artist, writer, and children's book author.
- Annie Skau Berntsen (1911–1992, also known as Sister Annie), Norwegian missionary in China and Hong Kong
- Annie Bersagel (born 1983), American long-distance runner and lawyer
- Annie Betts, British apiculturist and expert on bee diseases
- Annie Beustes (born 1945), French politician
- Annie Bidwell (1839–1918), American pioneer, suffragist and botanist
- Annie Black (born 1981), American politician
- Annie Blackman, American singer-songwriter
- Annie Walker Blackwell, American church worker
- Annie Blake, Canadian politician
- Annie Blakstad (1935–2023), Norwegian politician
- Annie Webb Blanton (1870–1945), American politician
- Annie R. Blount (1839–unknown), American poet, short story writer, and newspaper editor
- Annie Boclé (born 1957), French javelin thrower
- Annie B. Bond, American writer
- Annie Bonza (born 1940), New Zealand fashion designer
- Annie Booth, American jazz pianist and educator
- Annie Borckink (born 1951), Dutch speed skater
- Annie Bos (1886–1975), Dutch actress
- Annie Bosko, American singer-songwriter
- Annie Botha, First Lady of South Africa
- Annie Bovaird (born 1992), Canadian actress
- Annie Stocking Boyce (1880–1973), American missionary teacher
- Annie Cooper Boyd, American painter
- Annie Bradshaw (1859–1938), English novelist and animal welfare activist
- Annie Brewer (1874–1921), Welsh nurse who served in France throughout World War I
- Annie Brewster (c. 1858–1902), British nurse
- Annie Briard, Canadian artist
- Annie M. Briggs (born 1987), Canadian actress
- Annie Bright (1840–1913), Australian journalist and spiritualist
- Annie Brisset, Canadian linguist
- Annie Broadbent (1908–1996), British artistic gymnast
- Annie Brobst (born 1985), American singer songwriter
- Annie Brocoli (born 1971), Canadian actress
- Annie Florence Brown (1873–1945), American civic leader
- Annie Leigh Browne (1851–1936), British educationist and suffragist
- Annie Bruin (1870–1961), Dutch artist
- Annie Buckhurst, New Zealand metalwork artist
- Annie Babbitt Bulyea (1863–1934), Canadian temperance leader
- Annie Burgstede (born 1983), American actress
- Annie Burton (c. 1858–?), African-American memoirist
- Annie Byron, Australian actress

=== C ===
- Annie Caddick, British Paralympic rower
- Annie Cameron, Scottish historian
- Annie Campbell-Orde (born 1995), British rower
- Annie Cannon (1863–1941), American astronomer
- Annie Caputo, American government official
- Annie Cardin (born 1938), French artist
- Annie Carline (1862–1945), British artist
- Annie Caron (swimmer) (born 1941), French swimmer
- Annie Caron (soccer) (born 1964), Canadian soccer player
- Annie Carvosso (1861–1932), British-born Australian activist and social reformer
- Annie Louise Cary (1842–1921), American opera singer
- Annie Castledine (1939–2016), British theatre director, teacher and dramaturgy
- Annie Pardo Cemo (born 1941), Mexican cell biologist
- Annie de Chabert (1908–c. 1976), USVI businessperson and activist
- Annie Challan (born 1940), French harpist
- Annie Emma Challice (1821–1875), English author
- Annie Chandler (swimmer) (born 1987), American swimmer
- Annie Chang, Taiwanese-American actress and producer
- Annie Chapelier (born 1967), French politician
- Annie Chapman (c. 1841–1888), born Eliza Ann Smith, a victim of Jack the Ripper
- Annie Chemis (1862–1939), New Zealand homemaker, dairy worker, petitioner and charwoman
- Annie Chen (born 1989), Taiwanese actress, host and model
- Annie Choong (1934–2024), Malaysian sprinter
- Annie Christitch, Serbian patriot and journalist
- Annie Chu, Chinese-American architect
- Annie W. Clark (1843–1907), American social reformer
- Annie Swan Coburn, American art collector
- Annie Cohen-Solal (born 1948), French academic
- Annie Coker, African-American lawyer
- Annie Collins, New Zealand film editor
- Annie Cook (c. 1840–1878), American madam
- Annie Lee Cooper (1910–2010), African-American civil rights activist
- Annie Cordy (1928–2020), Belgian actress and singer
- Annie Corley, American actress
- Annie Sophie Cory (1868–1952), British writer
- Annie Cotton (born 1975), Canadian actress and singer
- Annie Coultate (1856–1931), British teacher and suffragist
- Annie Burgin Craig, First Lady of North Carolina (1913–17)
- Annie Walker Craig (1864–1948), British suffragette
- Annie I. Crawford (1856–1942), American artist
- Annie Crawley (born 1968), American underwater photographer
- Annie Cresta, from the book franchise "Hunger Games" by Suzanne Collins
- Annie Crisp (1854–1953), English-born nurse
- Annie Crummer, New Zealand drummer
- Annie Hall Cudlip (1838–1918), English novelist and writer
- Annie Curtis, Irish immunologist
- Annie Cuyt (born 1956), Belgian mathematician

=== D ===
- Annie Dalton (born 1948), British children's author
- Annie Charlotte Dalton, Canadian poet
- Annie Damer (1858–1915), Canadian-American public health nurse and health administrator
- Annie McCarer Darlington (1836–1907), American poet
- Annie Rowan Forney Daugette (1876–1974), American author and historian
- Annie Louise David, American harpist
- Annie David (born 1963), French politician
- Annie Elizabeth Davis, New Zealand photographer
- Annie Elizabeth Delany (1891–1995), American dentist and civil rights pioneer
- Annie Dove Denmark (1887–1974), American music educator
- Annie Desroy, Haitian novelist, playwright and teacher
- Annie Bell Robinson Devine (c. 1912–2000), American activist
- Annie Le Porte Diggs (1853–1916), Canadian writer, advocate
- Annie Dillard (1945–2026), American author, best known for her narrative prose in both fiction and non-fiction
- Annie Dirkens (1869–1942), German actress
- Annie DiRusso, American indie rock musician
- Annie Dixon (c. 1817–1901), English painter
- Annie Dodge Wauneka (1910–1997), Navajo Nation activist
- Annie Donaldson, American lawyer
- Annie Dookhan (born 1977), former crime lab chemist who admitted to falsifying evidence affecting up to 34,000 cases
- Annie Dorrington (1866–1926), Australian artist
- Annie Dorsen, American theater director
- Annie F. Downs, American author
- Annie Driscoll (born 1978), American speed skater
- Annie Ducaux (1908–1996), French actress
- Annie Duke (born 1965), American poker player
- Annie Jane Duncan (1858–1943), Australian factory inspector

=== E ===
- Annie Easley (1933–2011), African-American computer scientist, mathematician and rocket scientist
- Annie Ebrel, French musician
- Annie Edwards (c. 1830–1896), English novelist
- Annie Ee Yu Lian (1988–2015), Singaporean abuse and murder victim
- Annie Ellicott (born 1984), American musical artist
- Annie Elsom (1867–1962), New Zealand florist
- Annie Ernaux (born 1940), French writer
- Annie Esmond (1873–1945), British actress
- Annie Lloyd Evans (1873–1938), Welsh educator and scholar
- Annie Evelyn, furniture designer and artist
- Annie Ewart (born 1993), Canadian cyclist

=== F ===
- Annie Famose (born 1944), French former alpine skier
- Annie Fargé (1934–2011), French actress
- Annie Féolde (born 1945), French chef
- Annie Adams Fields (1834–1915), American writer
- Annie Finch (born 1956), American poet
- Annie Flanders (1939–2022), American editor and publisher
- Annie Flavin, rugby player
- Annie Johnson Flint (1866–1932), American writer
- Annie Flood (born 2003), American Paralympic volleyballer
- Annie Foreman-Mackey (born 1991), Canadian cyclist
- Annie Foulkes (1877–1962), Welsh writer and teacher
- Annie Fox, multiple people
- Anne Fraïsse (born 1959), French Latinist, academic, and university president
- Annie Francé-Harrar, Austrian biologist and writer
- Annie France (1915–2012), French actress
- Annie Fratellini (1932–1997), French circus artist, singer, film actress and clown
- Annie French (1872–1965), Scottish artist
- Annie Freud (born 1948), English poet and artist
- Annie Frisbie, American long-distance runner
- Annie Fuenmayor (born 1993), Venezuelan model
- Annie Funk (1874–1912), American missionary
- Annie Funke (born 1985), American actress
- Annie Furuhjelm (1859–1937), Finnish journalist, feminist activist and writer

=== G ===
- Annie Gallup, American singer-songwriter
- Annie Gam-Pedersen (born 1965), Danish footballer
- Annie Birgit Garde (born 1933), Danish actress
- Annie Gariepy (born 1975), Canadian cyclist
- Annie Marie Garraway, American mathematician and philanthropist
- Annie Laurie Gaylor (born 1955), American atheism activist
- Annie Geeves (1914–2006), English cricketer
- Annie Genevard (born 1956), French politician
- Annie Somers Gilchrist (1841–1912), American writer
- Annie Warren Gill (c. 1862–1930), British nurse and president of the College of Nursing
- Annie Gill, Indian television actress
- Annie Girardot (1931–2011), French actress
- Annie Glenn (1920–2020), American advocate
- Annie Warburton Goodrich (1866–1954), American nurse
- Annie Golden (born 1951), American actress and singer
- Annie Mackenzie Golding (1855–1934), church worker and women's rights advocate
- Annie Goldson, New Zealand journalism and film academic specializing in documentaries
- Annie Gorassini, Italian actress and singer
- Annie Gosbee (1935–1976), American baseball player
- Annie Gosfield (born 1960), American classical composer
- Annie Ryder Gracey (1836–1908), American writer, missionary
- Annie Gravatt (1894–1986), American forest pathologist
- Annie Gray, British food historian
- Annie Maria V. Green, Pioneer of the Union Colony of Colorado
- Annie Greenaway, Montserratian soprano
- Annie Grégorio (born 1957), French film and theatrical actress
- Annie Griffin, American writer and director
- Annie Jane Hughes Griffiths, Welsh woman peace campaigner
- Annie Griffiths (born 1953), American photographer, author, and speaker
- Annie Guay (born 1985), Canadian ice hockey player
- Annie Guglia (born 1990), Canadian skateboarder
- Annie Gulvin, English gardener
- Annie Laurie Gunter (1919–2005), American politician

=== H ===
- Annie Haeger (born 1990), American sailor
- Annie Riley Hale (1859–1944), American teacher, author and social critic
- Annie Isabella Hamilton, Canadian physician
- Annie Hardy (born 1981), American musician
- Annie Harmon (1855–1930), American painter
- Annie Fortescue Harrison (1850 or 1851–1944), English composer
- Annie Hart, American singer-songwriter
- Annie Hartley (1873–1898), English actress
- Annie Haslam (born 1944), UK progressive rock musician and painter
- Annie Hawks (1836–1918), American poet, gospel hymnist
- Annie Hayden, American singer-songwriter
- Annie Haynes, British mystery novel writer
- Annie Hearn, American poisoner
- Annie van der Heide (1896–1968), Dutch artist
- Annie Elizabeth Helme, English mayor of City of Lancaster
- Annie Hemingway (born 1985), British actress and voice-over artist
- Annie Herring (born 1945), American singer and songwriter
- Annie Hewlett (1887–1974), Canadian writer and artist
- Annie Hill (born 1955), British sailor and writer
- Annie Hindle, British male impersonator
- Annie Mabel Hodge (1862–1938), New Zealand teacher and headmistress
- Annie Hoey (born 1988), Irish politician
- Annie Hogan, British musician, record producer, composer and DJ
- Annie Holland (born 1965), British musician
- Annie Wealthy Holland (1871–1934), educator and organization founder
- Annie Holmström (1880–1953), Swedish tennis player
- Annie Homer (1884–1953), biochemist
- Annie Hooper (1897–1986), American sculptor
- Annie Powe Hopper, American academic
- Annie Horniman (1860–1937), English theatre matron and manager
- Annie Hornish (born 1966), American politician
- Annie Campbell Huestis (1876–1960), Canadian poet
- Annie Huggan (1890 – 1983), New Zealand mayor
- Annie Huggett (1892–1995), English suffragette
- Annie Hughes, American ultrarunner
- Annie Hulley (born 1955), English television and stage actress and voice over artist

=== I ===
- Annie Ilonzeh (born 1983), American actress
- Ann Ingle (born 1939), British-Irish writer
- Annie Inglis (1922 – 2010), Scottish drama teacher
- Annie Ittoshat (born 1970), Inuk Canadian Anglican bishop
- Annie Ivanova, international curator and author, cultural entrepreneur

=== J ===
- Annie Jack (1839–1912), Canadian writer
- Annie Jackson, multiple people
- Annie Wardlaw Jagannadham (1864–1894), Indian physician
- Annie Isabella James (1884–1965), New Zealand Presbyterian missionary
- Annie Laurie Wilson James (1862–?), American journalist
- Annie Jarraud-Vergnolle (born 1948), French politician
- Annie Jay (born 1957), French children's writer
- Annie Jean, Canadian film editor
- Annie Jiagge (1918–1996), Ghanaian judge and women's rights activist
- Annie Nicolette Zadoks-Josephus Jitta (c. 1904–2000), Dutch numismatist
- Annie Johnson, several people
- Annie Johnston, multiple people
- Annie Jones, Australian actress
- Annie Jump Cannon (1863–1941), American astronomer

=== K ===
- Annie Kanahele (1896/97–1989), educator and Hawaiiana expert
- Annie Karich, American soccer player
- Annie Karni (born 1983), American journalist
- Annie May Hurd Karrer (1893–1984), US plant physiologist
- Annie Keary (1825–1879), English novelist and, poet and children's writer
- Annie Keeler, American woman doctor
- Annie Brown Kennedy (1924–2023), American politician and attorney
- Annie Kennedy (1851–1918), American educator
- Annie Kenney (1879–1953), British suffragette
- Annie Kersting, American chemist
- Annie Chambers Ketchum (1824–1904), American educator, lecturer, writer
- Annie Kevans (born 1972), English artist
- Annie L. Key, American politician
- Annie Khalid (born 1987) Pakistani-born British singer and model
- Annie Ali Khan (c. 1980–2018), Pakistani journalist and author
- Annie Kibanji (born 1991), Zambian footballer
- Annie M. Knott (1850–1941), Christian Science practitioner and teacher
- Annie Lemp Konta, American writer and socialite
- Annie Korzen (born 1938), American actress
- Annie Koutrakis (born 1960), Canadian politician
- Annie Kriegel (1926–1995), French historian
- Annie Krouwel-Vlam (1928–2013), Dutch politician
- Annie Krull (1876–1947), German operatic soprano
- Annie Kuether (born 1952), American politician
- Annie Kunz (born 1993), American heptathlete
- Annie Kuster (born 1956), American politician

=== L ===
- Annie La Fleur (born 1969), Australian-Papua New Guinean basketball player
- Annie Lacroix-Riz, French academic and historian
- Annie Lado (born 2002), English badminton player
- Annie Lafleur (born 1980), Canadian poet from Quebec
- Annie Ina Laidlaw (1889–1978), navy matron
- Annie Rose Laing (1869–1946), British artist
- Annie Lambert (born 1946), British actress
- Annie Lambrechts, Belgian roller skater
- Annie Landau (1874–1945), English educator
- Annie Traquair Lang, American painter
- Annie MacDonald Langstaff (1887–1975), Canadian legal and women's activist
- Annie Lanzillotto (born 1963), American musician and writer
- Annie Lapin (born 1978), American artist
- Annie Larsen, American WWI-era three-masted schooner
- Annie Last (born 1990), British cross-country mountain biker
- Annie Laurendeau (born 1968), Canadian alpine skier
- Annie Laurent (born 1949), French political scientist
- Annie Laurie (1924–2006), American singer
- Annie Law (c. 1842–1889), British-American conchologist
- Annie Laws, American educator
- Annie Lazor (born 1994), American swimmer
- Annie Leary (c. 1832–1919), American Papal countess, society figure and philanthropist
- Annie LeBlanc (born 1992), Canadian middle-distance runner
- Annie LeBlanc (born 2004), American actress, singer, and YouTuber
- Annie Lederman (born 1983), American comedian
- Annie Lee, multiple people
- Annie Leibovitz (born 1949), American portrait photographer
- Annie Lemani, Malawian politician
- Annie Lemay (born 1977), Canadian curler
- Annie Lennox (born 1954), Scottish singer, vocalist of Eurythmics
- Annie Leonard (born 1964), American critic of excessive consumerism
- Annie Leuch-Reineck (1880–1978), Swiss mathematician
- Annie Levesque (born 1979), Canadian volleyball player
- Annie May Alston Lewis (1917–2006), American religious librarian
- Annie Lewis (1869–1896), American actress
- Annie Liljeberg (born 1957), Swedish diver
- Annie Lin (born 1980), American singer songwriter
- Annie Liu (born 1981), Hong Kong actress
- Annie Livshis (1864–1953), American anarchist
- Annie Lobert, American former prostitute and Christian missionary
- Annie Lock, Australian missionary
- Annie Logiel, Ugandan politician
- Annie Londonderry (1870–1947), Latvian-born American immigrant, first woman to bicycle around the world
- Annie Lööf (born 1983), Swedish politician and lawyer
- Annie Lowe (1834–1910), Australian suffragist
- Annie Lowrey (born 1984), American journalist
- Annie Luetkemeyer (born 1972), American physician and infectious diseases researcher
- Annie Lush (born 1980), English sailor
- Annie Lynch (1864–1938), religious and hospital administrator

=== M ===
- Annie Mac (born 1978), Irish DJ and presenter
- Annie Macaulay-Idibia (born 1984), Nigerian model, presenter and actress
- Annie S. Macdonald (1849–1924), Scottish bookbinder
- Annie MacDonald (1832–1897), British courtier
- Annie Machon, former MI5 intelligence officer, author and public speaker
- Annie Mack (1850–1935), Irish-born American stage actress
- Annie MacKinnon (1868–1940), American mathematician
- Annie Marion MacLean, American sociologist
- Annie MacPherson (1833–1904), Scottish evangelical Quaker and philanthropist
- Annie Madsen (born 1945), Danish fencer
- Annie Major, British politician and first woman Lord Mayor of Kingston upon Hull
- Annie Turnbo Malone (1877–1957), American businesswoman
- Annie Malone (1877–1957), African-American businesswoman, inventor and philanthropist
- Annie Maloney (born 1989), Australian cricketer
- Annie Man (born 1976), Hong Kong actress
- Annie Marland (1861–c. 1947), British trade unionist
- Annie Martin, multiple people
- Annie Mascarene (1902–1963), Indian politician
- Annie Massy (1868–1931), Irish marine biologist
- Annie Mathews, American politician
- Annie Matumbi, Malawian musician
- Annie Russell Maunder (1868–1947), Northern Irish astronomer and mathematician
- Annie S. D. Maunder (1868–1947), British astronomer
- Annie Maxton (1888–1981), Scottish politician and trade unionist
- Annie Maynard (born 1981), Australian actress
- Annie McCall (1858–1949), English doctor
- Annie McCarrick (born 1967), American missing person
- Annie Virginia McCracken (1686–?), American author
- Annie McDaniel (born 1968), American politician
- Annie McEnroe (born 1955), American film actress
- Annie McIntosh (1871–1951), British nurse and nursing leader
- Annie McKitrick (born 1952), Canadian politician
- Annie L. McPheeters (1908–1994), American librarian and activist
- Annie McVicar (1862–1954), New Zealand community worker and local politician
- Annie van der Meer (1928–2004), Dutch speed skater
- Annie Meijer (1875–1954), Dutch politician
- Annie Meinertzhagen (1889–1928), Scottish ornithologist
- Annie Fairlamb Mellon, British materialization medium
- Annie Menz, American politician
- Annie Mercier, French actress
- Annie Russell Merrylees (1866–1959), British artist
- Annie Nathan Meyer (1867–1951), American novelist and activist
- Annie Meyers (1873–1942), Australian guest house owner
- Annie Mikpiga (1900–1984), Canadian Inuk artist
- Annie Miles (born 1958), English actress
- Annie Rix Militz, American New Thought writer
- Annie Cleland Millar (1855–1939), New Zealand businesswoman
- Annie Jenness Miller (1859–1935), American fashion designer
- Annie Miller (tennis) (born 1977), American tennis player
- Annie Miller (1835–1925), English artists' model
- Annie Millwood (died 1888), postulated, but not definitely known to be Jack the Ripper's first victim
- Annie Mobley (born 1942), American politician
- Annie E. Molloy, American activist
- Annie Moniqui (born 1990), Canadian weightlifter
- Annie Monroe, American actress and musician
- Annie Moore Cherry, American professor, author and playwright
- Annie Moore, multiple people
- Annie Morris (born 1978), British artist
- Annie Christina Morrison (1870–1953), New Zealand headmistress
- Annie Morton (born 1970), American model
- Annie Lee Moss (1905–1996), American communications clerk
- Annie Moysey (1875–1976), aboriginal matriarch
- Annie Mullin (1847–1921) – Welsh suffragist, social worker and Liberal councillor
- Annie Chidzira Muluzi (1952–2021), First Lady of Malawi
- Annie Mumolo (born 1973), American actress
- Annie Murdoch née Brown (1856–1945), wife of Patrick John Murdoch and grandmother of Rupert Murdoch
- Annie Murphy (born 1986), Canadian actress
- Annie Murray (1906–1996), Scottish nurse
- Annie Murray (writer), English writer
- Annie Feray Mutrie (1826–1893), British painter
- Annie Sinanduku Mwange, Congolese miner and activist

=== N ===
- Annie Namala, Indian activist
- Annie Neugebauer, poet and horror writer
- Annie Newton, English boxer
- Annie Nightingale (1940–2024), British radio broadcaster
- Annie Niviaxie, Inuk artist
- Annie Hutton Numbers (1897–1988), British chemist

=== O ===
- Annie Oakley (1860–1926), American sharpshooter
- Annie O'Hara (1869–1897), Australian medical doctor
- Annie Okonkwo (1960–2023), Nigerian politician
- Annie Oliv (born 1987), Swedish beauty pageant contestant
- Annie Shepley Omori, American painter
- Annie L. Y. Orff (died 1914), American journalist; magazine editor and publisher
- Annie Ovenden, British painter

=== P ===
- Annie Silva Pais, Portuguese supporter
- Annie Yellowe Palma (1962–2022), British poet and child protection advocate
- Annie Palmen (1926–2000), Dutch singer
- Annie Pankowski (born 1994), American ice hockey forward
- Annie Parisse (born 1975), American actress
- Annie Park (born 1995), American professional golfer
- Annie Parkhouse, British comic book lecturer
- Annie Patterson (1868–1934), Irish composer and author
- Annie Payep, Cameroonian journalist
- Annie Pearson, Viscountess Cowdray (1860–1931), English suffragist and philanthropist
- Annie Seymour Pearson, British suffragette
- Annie Peavy (born 1996), American Paralympic dressage rider
- Annie Smith Peck (1850–1935), American mountain climber
- Annie Pelletier (born 1973), Canadian diver
- Annie Stevens Perkins (1868–?), American writer
- Annie Perreault (born 1971), Canadian short track speed skater
- Annie Miner Peterson, Indigenous Linguistic Consultant
- Annie Petsonk, American attorney
- Annie Pettway, multiple people
- Annie Florence Petty (1871–1962), pioneer North Carolina librarian
- Annie Coleman Peyton, American educator
- Annie Philippe (born 1946), French pop singer
- Annie Pietri (born 1956), French writer
- Annie Pixley, American actress
- Annie Poon, American animator based in NYC
- Annie Pootoogook (1969–2016), Canadian Inuk artist
- Annie Porter, English zoologist
- Annie Potts (born 1952), American actress
- Annie Power (born 2008), Irish-need thoroughbred racehorse
- Annie Lola Price (1903–1972), American judge
- Annie Proulx (born 1935), American novelist, short story writer and journalist

=== Q ===
- Annie Qu, Chinese statistician
- Annie Quadros (born 1956), Indian actress and singer
- Annie Abernethie Pirie Quibell, British artist and archaeologist

=== R ===
- Annie Raines (born 1969), American musician
- Annie Raja, Indian politician
- Annie Ramirez, Filipino jujutsu practitioner
- Annie Raoult (born 1951), French applied mathematician
- Annie Rauwerda (born 1999), American Internet personality and Wikipedian
- Annie Lee Rees (1864–1949), New Zealand writer, teacher, lawyer and community leader
- Annie Reich (1902–1971), Austrian-American psychoanalyst
- Annie Reickert, Hawaiian big wave surfer
- Annie Reinhart, Missouri politician
- Annie Reiner, American writer
- Annie Renouf-Whelpley, American painter, singer and composer
- Annie Rattray Rentoul (1882–1978), Australian lyricist and children's writer
- Annie Rialland (born 1948), French linguist
- Annie Elmira Rice (1852–1884), American physician
- Annie Q. Riegel (born 1992), American actress
- Annie Riis (1927–2020), Norwegian writer
- Annie Rivieccio, American fitness competitor
- Annie Robe (c. 1866–1922), American actress
- Annie Rockfellow (1866–1954), American architect
- Annie Rogers (1856–1937), British teacher and campaigner
- Annie Katsura Rollins, American artist, scenic designer, and puppeteer
- Annie Rojas (born 1994), Mexican voice actress
- Annie Romein-Verschoor (1885–1975), Dutch author and historian
- Annie Ros (1926–2013), Dutch gymnast
- Annie Rosar (1888–1963), Austrian actress
- Annie Ross (1930–2020), British-American jazz singer and actress
- Annie Rothwell (1837–1927), Canadian novelist and poet
- Annie Roycroft (1926–2019), Irish first female news director
- Annie Russell (1864–1936), American actress
- Annie Ryder Gracey, American writer and missionary

=== S ===
- Annie Sabo, American journalist
- Annie Sage, Australian military nurse
- Annie Saker (1882–1932), English actress
- Annie Salager, French poet
- Annie Salomons (1885–1980), Dutch writer, poet and translator
- Annie Sanders, American rock climber
- Annie Mabel Sandes (1881–1966), Australian technical-college superintendent
- Annie Sartre-Fauriat (born 1947), French historian and epigrapher
- Annie Nowlin Savery (c. 1831–1891), American suffragist and philanthropist
- Annie Gregg Savigny, Canadian novelist
- Annie M.G. Schmidt (1911–1995), Dutch writer
- Annie Schnackenberg (1835–1905), prominent member of women's suffrage movement of New Zealand
- Annie Schreijer-Pierik (born 1953), Dutch politician
- Annie Seel (born 1968), Swedish motorcycle racer
- Annie Segarra (born 1990), American YouTuber and disability rights activist
- Annie Selden, American mathematics educator
- Annie Servais-Thysen (1933–2022), Belgian politician
- Annie C. Shaw (1852–1887), American painter
- Annie Shekhar (c. 1938–2022), Indian politician
- Annie Bartlett Shepard (1861–1944), American conservative activist
- Annie W. S. Siebert (1864–1947), American artist
- Annie Silverstein, American film editor and screenwriter
- Annie Simpson (born 1990), British cyclist
- Annie Sloan (born 1949), British artist, color expert and author
- Annie Trumbull Slosson (1838–1926), entomologist and writer
- Annie Smith, several people
- Annie M. P. Smithson (1873–1948), Irish novelist, poet and nationalist
- Annie Soisbault (1934–2012), French tennis player and motor sports driver
- Annie Somers (1881–1954), British political organizer
- Annie Souriau, French seismologist
- Annie Speirs (1889–1926), British swimmer
- Annie Spell, American politician
- Annie Sprinkle (born 1954), American pornographic actress and sex educator
- Annie St John (1954–1990), British broadcaster
- Annie St-Pierre, Canadian film director and producer
- Annie Starke (born 1988 or 1989), American actress
- Annie Stebler-Hopf (1861–1918), Swiss-born painter
- Annie Stein (1913–1981), civil rights activist
- Annie Fitzgerald Stephens (1844–1934), American landowner
- Annie Morgan Suganami (born 1952), Welsh artist and musician
- Annie Sugier (born 1942), French physician and feminist
- Annie or Anne Sullivan (1866–1936), American teacher, best known as the instructor and lifelong companion of Helen Keller
- Annie Svedin (born 1991), Swedish ice hockey player
- Annie S. Swan (1859–1943), Scottish journalist and fiction writer
- Annie Swynnerton (1844–1933), English painter

=== T ===
- Annie Tagoe, British athlete
- Annie Tallent (1827–1901), American pioneer and writer
- Annie Clark Tanner (1864–c. 1942), American Mormon author
- Annie Louise Tanner-Musin, American soprano singer
- Annie Taylor, multiple people
- Annie Tempest, British artist
- Annie Thayyil (1918–1993), Indian novelist, journalist, translator and biographer
- Annie Thompson (1845–1913), wife of John Thompson, fourth prime minister of Canada
- Annie Thurman (born 1996), American actress
- Annie Haven Thwing (1851–1940), American writer
- Annie O. Tibbits (1871–1957), English author
- Annie Tietze (born 1950), American politician
- Annie Timmermans (1919–1958), Dutch swimmer
- Annie Rensselaer Tinker (1884–1924), volunteer nurse in WWI, suffragist, and philanthropist
- Annie Tinsley (1808–1885), British novelist and poet
- Annie Toinon (1875–1967), French actress
- Annie Tomasini, American political operative
- Annie Tomlinson (1870–1933), British journalist and co-operative movement supporter
- Annie Caroline Pontifex Toorop (1891–1955), Dutch painter and lithographer
- Anníe Mist Þórisdóttir (born 1989), Icelandic CrossFit athlete
- Annie Quayle Townend (c. 1845–1914), New Zealand property owner
- Annie Tribble (1932–2013), American basketball coach
- Annie Eliot Trumbull (1857–1949), American author

=== U ===
- Annie Ure (1893–1976), British classical archaeologist

=== V ===
- Annie Guo VanDan, American journalist
- Annie VanderMeer, American video game designer
- Annie Vautier (1939–2024), French performance artist
- Annie Vermeiren, Belgian cyclist
- Annie Vernay (1921–1941), Swiss actress
- Annie Vidal (born 1956), French politician
- Annie Villeneuve (born 1983), French-Canadian pop singer-songwriter
- Annie Villiger (1914–1987), Swiss diver
- Annie E. Vinton, American postmistress and politician
- Annie Vitelli (c. 1837–1917), New Zealand singer and entertainer
- Annie Vivanti (1866–1942), Italian poet and writer
- Annie Von Behren, American actress

=== W ===
- Annie Walke, English painter
- Annie Walker, several people
- Annie Wall, multiple people
- Annie Wallace (born 1965), Scottish actress
- Annie Walsh (fl. 1870–1880), American gangster also known as "Battle Annie"
- Annie Wan, Chinese artist
- Annie Wang, multiple people
- Annie Little Warrior (1895–1966), Native American ledger artist from North Dakota
- Annie Clo Watson, American social worker
- Annie Dodge Wauneka (1910–1997), Navajo Nation activist
- Annie Weetaltuk, First Indigenous Canadian flight attendant
- Annie Wells, multiple people
- Annie Wersching (1977–2023), American actress
- Annie Wheeler (1867–1950), soldiers' welfare worker
- Annie Julia White (1852–1932), New Zealand artist
- Annie Whitehead (born 1955), British jazz trombone player
- Annie Whitelaw (1875–1966), headmistress and educationist
- Annie Whittle, New Zealand actress and singer
- Annie Wikman, Australian cricketer
- Annie Louise Wilkerson, American obstetrician
- Annie Williams (disambiguation)
- Annie Winquist (born 1993), Norwegian alpine skier
- Annie Steger Winston (1862–1927), American writer
- Annie Withey, American farmer and entrepreneur
- Annie Turner Wittenmyer (1827–1900), American temperance activist
- Annie Wood, several people
- Annie Wu, several people
- Annie Forsyth Wyatt (1885–1961), Australian community worker, conservationist and Red Cross worker
- Annie Xu (born 1999), American badminton player

=== Y ===
- Annie Yeamans (1835–1912), American actress
- Annie Yi (born 1968), Taiwanese singer, actress and writer
- Annie Henrietta Yorke (1844–1926), English philanthropist, temperance reformer
- Annie Mae Young, American artist
- Annie Young (1942–2018), American politician
- Annie Young-Scrivner, American business executive
- Annie Mary Youngman (1859–1919), English painter
- Annie Henrietta Yule (1874–1950), British businesswoman

=== Z ===
- Annie Zaenen, American linguist
- Annie Zaidi, multiple people
- Annie Zaleski, American music journalist
- Annie van 't Zelfde (1913–2002), Dutch jazz musician
- Annie Zuiderwijk (1943–2020), Dutch herpetologist
- Annie Leong Wai Mun (1971–2001), better known as Annie Leong, Singaporean murder victim.

== Fictional characters ==
- The title character of the comic strip Little Orphan Annie, also in plays and movies
- Annie Brackett, in the movie Halloween (1978) by John Carpenter and in the remake Halloween (2007) by Rob Zombie
- Annie Edison, in the NBC sitcom Community, played by Alison Brie
- Annie Ghazikhanian, a Marvel Comics character and ally to the X-Men
- Annie January, a main character in The Boys
- Annie Kim, a minor character in the American sitcom Community
- Annie Sawyer, a protagonist of the British television series Being Human
- Annie Wilkes, in the novel Misery by Stephen King and in the film Misery
- Annie and Clarabel, coaches of Thomas the Tank Engine in The Railway Series

== See also ==
- Annie (disambiguation)
- Anna (disambiguation)
- Cougar Annie, pioneer on Vancouver Island, Canada, born Ada Annie Rae-Arthur (1888–1985)
