= Annie Pettway =

Annie Pettway may refer to:

- Annie Bell Pettway (1930–2003), American artist
- Annie E. Pettway (1904–1972), American artist
