= Anna Wu (disambiguation) =

Anna Wu may refer to:

- Anna Wu (born 1951), Hong Kong political figure
- Anna Wu (Chuck), a fictional character in the TV series Chuck

== See also ==
- Annie Wu (disambiguation)
