= Ann Alexander =

Ann Alexander (or similar) may refer to:

- Ann Alexander (banker) (1770–1861), British Quaker, banker and bill broker
- Ann Dunlop Alexander (1896–1969), Scottish artist
- Ann Alexander (ship), whaler
- Anne Jardin (born 1959), married name Anne Alexander, Canadian swimmer
- Anne Alexander, editor of Prevention magazine

== See also ==
- Annie Alexander (disambiguation)
