= Annie I. Crawford =

American artist

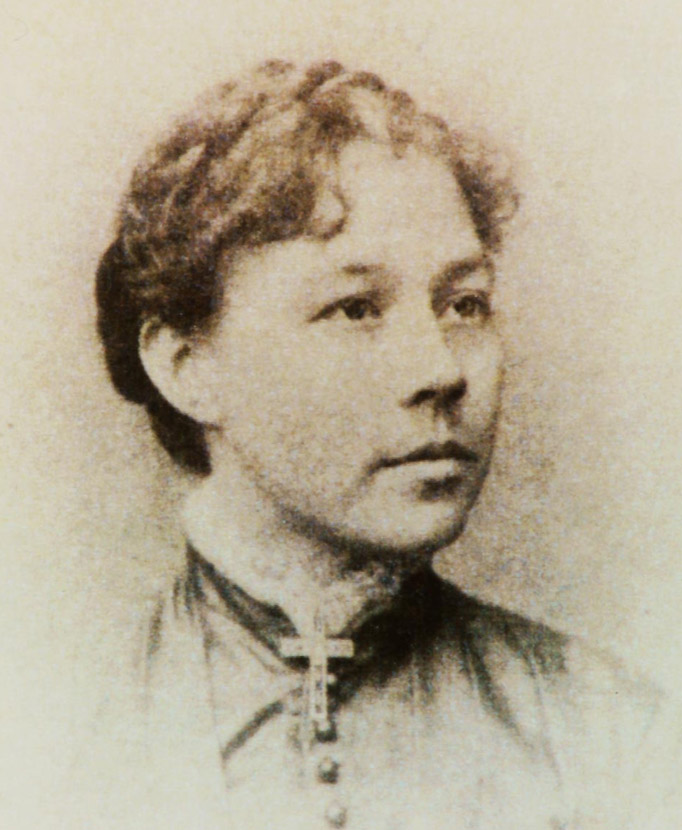
- Born: November 3, 1856; Buffalo, New York
- Died: February 18, 1942 (aged 85); Buffalo, New York
- Known for: Painting, Printmaking
- Partner: Charlotte "Emma" Wharton Kaan

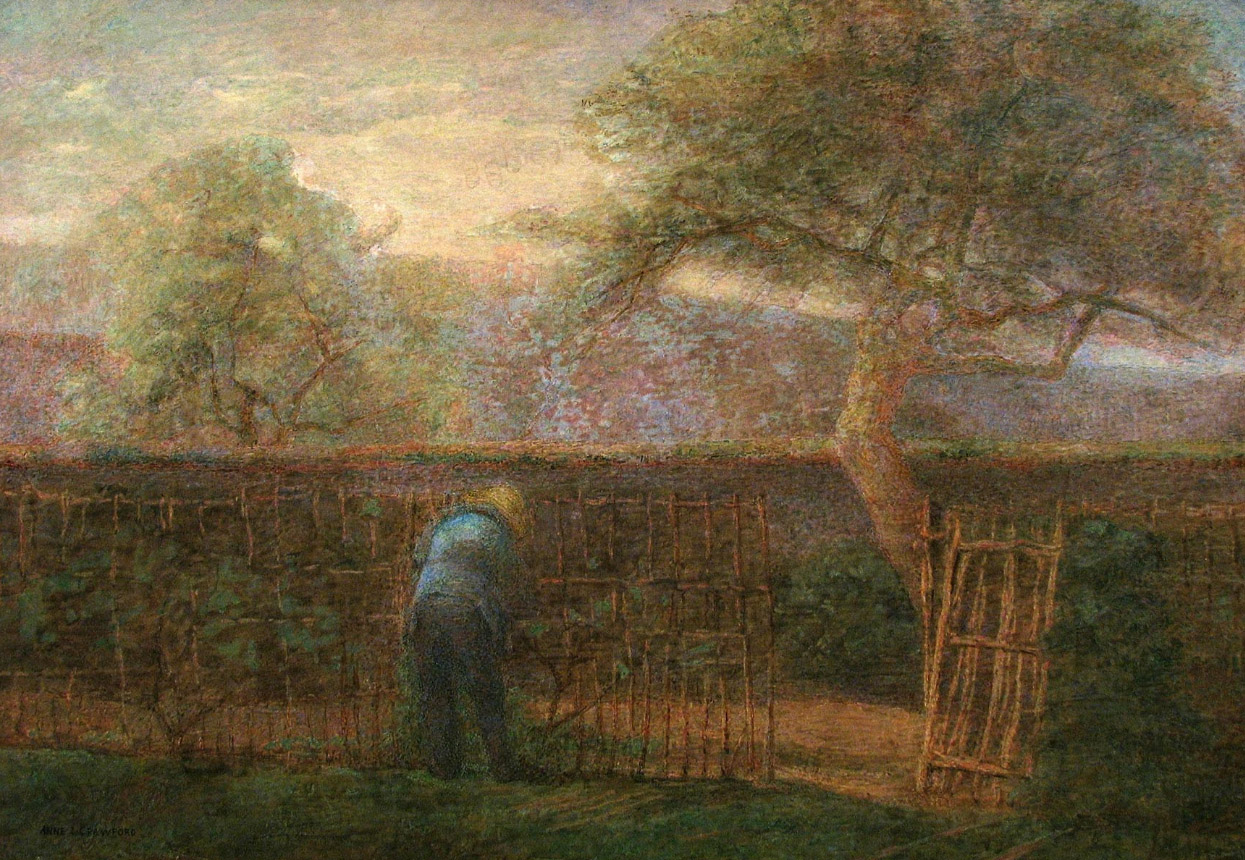
The Gardener

Annie Isabel Crawford (3 November 1856 - 18 February 1942) was an American painter and printmaker.

== Biography ==
Crawford was born in Buffalo, New York, on November 3, 1856. According to Jacobsen's Biographical Index of American Artist. She was born 1855. Annie Crawford was an student of Lars G. Stellstedt. Before her studies in Rome and Paris she aspired to be a student of literature, she studied under Stellstedt for three years then decided to further her education. She studied at the Buffalo Fine Arts Academy and then traveled to Europe to study in Rome and Paris. While in Europe she met Charlotte "Emma" Wharton Kaan (1860-1949), who joined Crawford in Buffalo where the couple resided together and collaborated on artistic projects, including teaching. The couple also created a unique form of relief printing that combined woodcut prints and hand-coloring. They were associated with the Arts and Crafts movement.

Crawford exhibited work at the 20th Century Club, the Buffalo Fine Arts Academy (including the Albright Art Gallery), and the National Academy of Design. She was a member of The Society of Arts and Crafts of Boston.

Crawford died on February 18, 1942, in Buffalo.
