= Annie Brewster =

Nurse

Annie Brewster (1858 – 11 February 1902) worked as a nurse at the London Hospital from 1881 to 1902 and was one of the first Afro-Caribbean nurses to have been identified as working in Britain during this period.

== Early life ==
Annie Catherine Brewster was born on the island of Saint Vincent in the Caribbean in 1858. Her father, Pharour Chaderton Brewster, was a wealthy merchant from Barbados who settled in South London in the 1860s with his family, including Annie and her younger sister, Laura.

== Nursing career ==
In 1881 Annie Brewster entered the London Hospital as a probationer (or trainee) nurse and was appointed to the hospital's nursing staff in 1884. She was promoted to nurse in charge of the Ophthalmic Wards in 1888. Brewster became known as "Nurse Ophthalmic" because of her work with elderly patients who were losing their sight.

== Death ==
Annie died aged 43 after an emergency operation in the London Hospital on 11 February 1902. She was buried the City of London Cemetery in Newham, London. The matron of the London Hospital, Eva Luckes, wrote of Brewster that: "She had spent the best and happiest years of her life at the London Hospital. She was with us for just over 20 years, nearly 14 of which had been spent as the nurse in charge of the Ophthalmic Wards. With her quick intelligence she became very skilful in the treatment of 'eyes' and her kindness to the poor old people who passed through her hands during this period was unwearied. Hospital friends mourn her loss and keep her in affectionate remembrance."

On 17 November 2018, Annie Brewster was one of a number of figures whose photographs were projected onto the facade of the former Royal London Hospital building in Whitechapel to mark the 70th anniversary of the NHS.

In 2019 the historian Stephen Bourne searched for and rediscovered the forgotten grave of Annie Brewster in the City of London Cemetery. In 2021 his entry for Annie Brewster was published in the Oxford Dictionary of National Biography.
