= Annie Cardin =

French artist

- Born: September 30, 1938 (age 86); Paris, France

Annie Cardin (born September 30, 1938) is a French artist. Born in Paris, her work is included in the collections of the Smithsonian American Art Museum, the Asheville Art Museum and the Art Institute of Chicago.
