= Annie Robe =

American actress

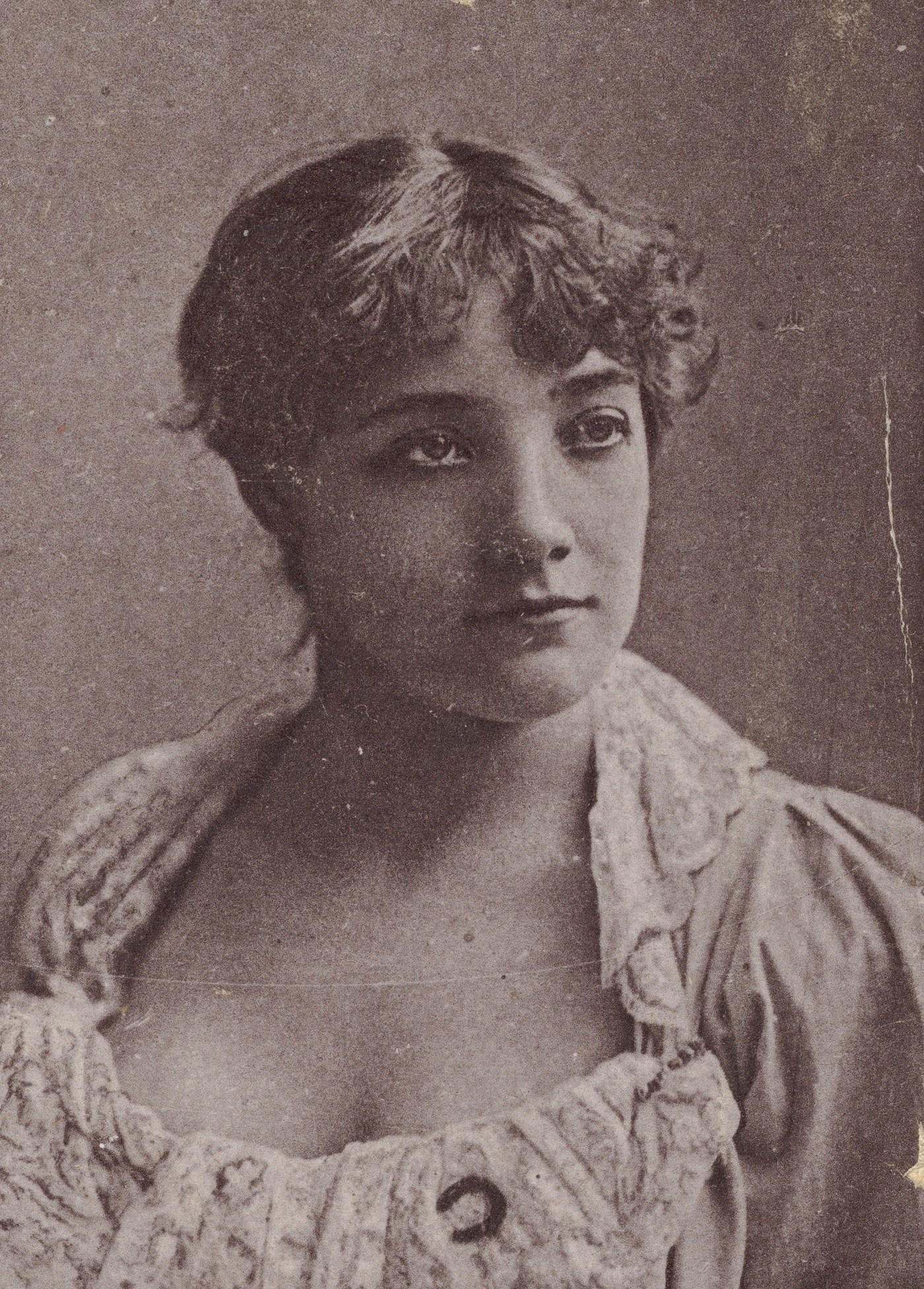
- Born: 1866; London, England
- Died: July 26, 1922 (aged 55–56); Pittsfield, Massachusetts, United States
- Resting place: Swan Point Cemetery, Providence, Rhode Island, United States
- Occupation: Actress
- Spouse: Daniel Paine Griswold (m. 1888-1911 his death)

Annie Robe (1866–1922) was an English-born American stage actress prominent in the final decades of the Victorian era, the 1880s and 1890s.

Robe's father was a scenic artist, and her mother was English actress Eliza Rugg. Robe began acting when she was 11 years old. Lester Wallack discovered her on a visit to England and brought her to the United States to act with his company.

She was distantly related, through marriage, to Ethel Barrymore, whose husband Russell Griswold Colt was a relative of Robe's husband Daniel Paine Griswold.

Robe died a widow at Pittsfield, Massachusetts on July 26, 1922.
