= Annie Sinanduku Mwange =

Congolese miner and activist

- Citizenship: Democratic Republic of the Congo
- Occupations: Union organizer, miner, and women's rights activist

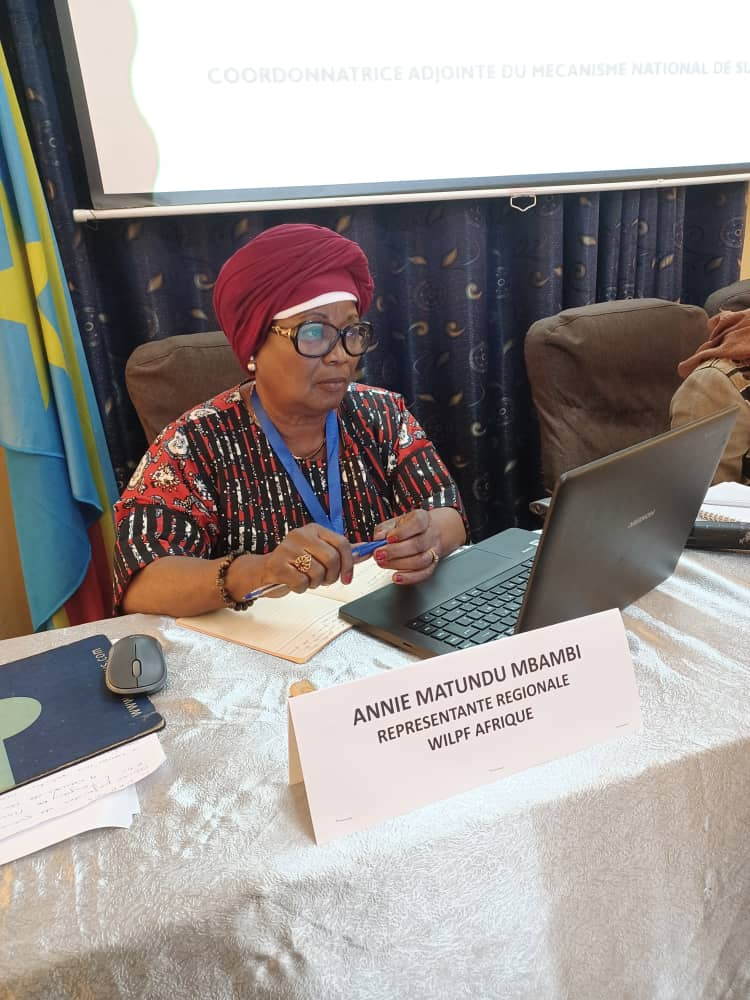
Annie Matundu, WILPF Africa Representative.

Annie Sinanduku Mwange is a Congolese miner and activist. In 2024, she was included in 100 Women.

== Career ==
In 2010 Mwange launched a program for orphaned children in Kailo Territory, but was unable to reach many of them because they were working in mines. Mwange was aware of the need to improve women's livelihoods, which would subsequently eradicate child labour. Further, women were affected by sexual harassment and inequality in the workplace. Because of this, Mwange began a grassroots movement to fight inequality and sexual harassment in mines.

Mwange founded Asefa, civil society organization that launched a pilot program focused on education and training to change gender dinamics and improve the health and safety of women in Kailo working in mines.

As a strategy to avoid inequality and sexual harassment, Mwange wants the women in her network to own and hold leadership positions in mining operations, in place of the peripheral labor that has been assigned to them, like washing extracted minerals. To achieve this, she began to look for investors to provide financing to the female entrepreneurs (sometimes neightobs and family). She was able to get at least 56 of hem to become "mère boss" or "mother boss" of mines. Further, she received support from the Humanitarian Initiative at Harvard University and financing from the United States Agency for International Development.

== Recognition ==
In 2024, an article by Mélanie Gouby about Annie Sinanduku Mwange was nominated for the One World Media Award, which recognizes coverage of narratives in the global south. The same year, Mwange was recognized as one of the BBC's "100 Women."
