= Annie Wu =

Annie Wu may refer to:

- Annie Wu (businesswoman) (b. 1948), Hong Kong–based Chinese businesswoman
- Annie Wu (actress) (b. 1978), Chinese actress and model
- Annie Wu (artist) (b. 1988), American comic book artist

== See also ==
- Anna Wu (disambiguation)
