= Annie Haven Thwing =

American writer

Annie Haven Thwing (July 4, 1851 – June 5, 1940), also known as A.H. Thwing or Anne Haven Thwing, was an American historian and children's author. Her book for children, Chicken Little, with illustrations by Nelly Littlehale Umbstaetter, appeared in 1899; as the title suggests, the book re-tells the old story of a chicken who believes the sky is falling.

As a historian Thwing compiled an enormous card index of subjects related to the history of Boston, Massachusetts. She donated the index to the Massachusetts Historical Society, where the cards "occupied seventy-four library drawers in the catalog room." She also created a 3-dimensional model of the town of Boston as it appeared in 1775, based on her research. The model now resides on public display in the Old South Meeting House. In 1920 her book on Boston history, The Crooked & Narrow Streets of the Town of Boston 1630-1822, reached the Boston Globe best-seller list. At the time the book sold for five dollars. In addition to her work on Boston history she wrote about Orr's Island, Maine, where her family maintained a residence. In the course of her life she corresponded with a number of notables including Oliver Wendell Holmes Jr., Fanny Bowditch Dixwell Holmes, Alice James, Charles Franklin Thwing, Horace Howard Furness, and Edward Everett Hale. She also contributed to charitable causes such as the Massachusetts Infant Asylum.
