= Annie Wall =

Annie Wall may refer to:

- Annie Wall Barnett (1859–1942), American writer, litterateur, poet
- Annie Russell Wall (1835–1920), American historian and writer
