= Annie Fairlamb Mellon =

British materialization medium

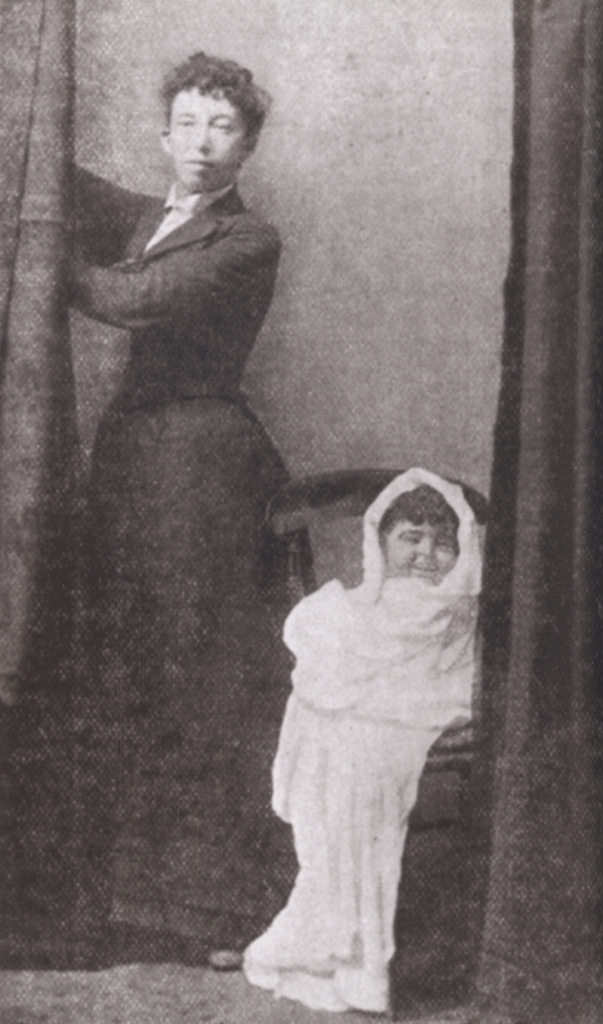
Annie Fairlamb Mellon with her alleged materialization Cissie.

Annie Fairlamb Mellon (1850–1938) also known as Mrs. J. B. Mellon was a British materialization medium.

Mellon was born in Newcastle upon Tyne and became interested in spiritualism from a young age. In the 1870s she worked with the medium C. E. Wood and was associated with the Newcastle Spiritual Evidence Society. In 1877, she resigned from the Society due to personal problems with committee members. She married James Barr Mellon in July 1878 and worked as an independent medium, giving séances in Australia.

Psychical researchers strongly suspected that Mellon's materializations were fraudulent. She was defended by the spiritualist William Thomas Stead.

Mellon claimed that Frederic W. H. Myers, Sidgwick and other members from the Society for Psychical Research had endorsed her mediumship as genuine. On investigation this claim turned out to be false. In February and March, 1875 in Newcastle, Myers and Sidgwick who attended séances described her mediumship as "inconclusive" and "suspicious".

On 12 October 1894 in Sydney, Mellon was exposed as a fraud by Thomas Shekleton Henry. He had caught Mellon kneeling on the floor pretending to be a spirit of a young girl called 'Cissie' with a mask and muslin. A false beard, clothing and more muslin was found in her séance cabinet. The exposure is considered to have discredited Mellon as a medium. Psychical researcher Hereward Carrington commented that she was "detected and caught red-handed, in producing the grossest fraud."
