= Annie Buckhurst =

New Zealand metalwork artist

Annie Buckhurst (24 November 1894 – 9 December 1959) was a New Zealand metalwork artist. Her work is held in the collections of Christchurch Art Gallery and Te Papa.

== Biography ==
Buckhurst was the fifth of eight children. She attended the Canterbury College School of Art from around 1907. She exhibited work at the 1912 Auckland Society of Arts exhibition. Her main tutor at the college was Frederick Gurnsey, and when he became acting director of the college in 1917, Buckhurst took over his classes. Around this time she designed the first school badge for Rangi Ruru Girls' School, a private girls' school in Christchurch.

When Buckhurst married in 1921 she retired from teaching.
