= Annie Mathews =

American politician

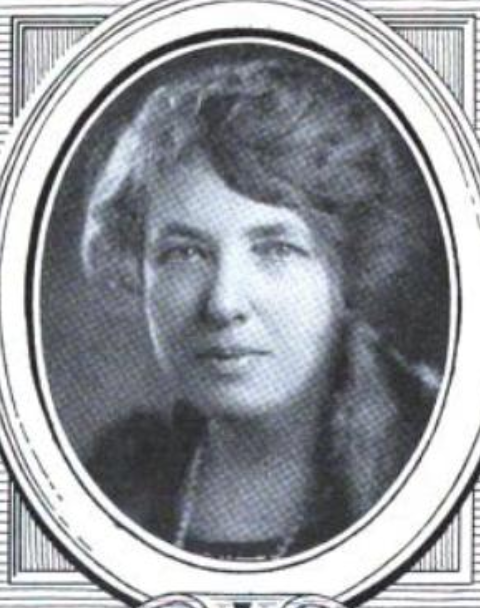
- Annie Mathews, from a 1924 publication
- Born: November 6, 1866; New York City, New York, US
- Died: October 24, 1959 (age 92); New York City, New York, US
- Occupation(s): Politician, suffragist

Annie Mathews (November 6, 1866 – October 24, 1959) was an American politician. She was elected to the office of Register of New York County in 1921, and re-elected in 1925.

== Early life and education ==
Mathews was born in New York City, the daughter of John Mathews and Elizabeth Gillespie Mathews. Her father was born in England and her mother was born in Ireland. She had brothers Cyril and William. She attended Columbia University.

== Career ==
Mathews was a suffragist, and was a clothing designer and importer before her political career. When she ran for county office in 1921, as the Tammany Hall candidate, the press commented on her "stunning" evening gowns. "A woman's dress should be such as to call attention to the woman herself and the things she stands for," she explained of her strategy.

Mathews was elected to the office of Register of New York County in 1921, and re-elected in 1925. "I feel that I have a duty in paving the way for women officials who are to follow," she said in 1921; "It is absolutely necessary that I succeed, for if I do not thousands will say it is because I am a woman and thereby a difficulty barrier would be placed in the way of the next woman to hold office."

Mathews' office filed property records for the City of New York, including deeds, mortgages, and building plans. She clashed with Mayor John Francis Hylan in 1922 when she tried to give two of her employees unscheduled salary increases. During her tenure as Register, she promoted logistical and technological improvements, including photostat machines. She organized an exhibit of historic maps when she was on the planning committee for the 1924 Democratic National Convention when it met in New York City. She was a delegate to the 1928 Democratic National Convention in Houston.

The New York Times reported on Mathews' opinions about women's votes and how they might affect the outcomes of state and national political races. "The women are the buyers," she explained in 1924. "They know how much the prices of all the things which they must buy have gone up under a Republican tariff. Women also do not take political corruption so philosophically as do men."

Mathews retired from office in 1929. At the time of her retirement, she spoke at the Madison Club. "We are new and few in office and all eyes are upon us," she said of women in elected office." In 1931, she made controversial statements about political parties paying district leaders and allowing gifts of gratitude, to avoid hidden corruption. "Nobody would do this difficult and trying work just for love of country", she declared. In 1936 she spoke at Democratic rallies on a tour of New York state.

== Publications ==
- "Methods of Land Registration" (1925)

== Personal life ==
Mathews lived with her widowed brother William when they were both retired. She died in 1959, at a nursing home in Yonkers, at the age of 92.
