= Annie May Hurd Karrer =

American botanist (1893–1984)

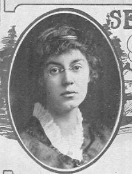
- Born: Annie May Hurd; July 28, 1893; La Conner, Washington
- Died: May 15, 1984 (aged 90); Orange County, Florida
- Education: University of Washington, University of California, Berkeley
- Scientific career
- Fields: Plant physiology
- Workplaces: United States Department of Agriculture
- Thesis: Orientations and Phototropisms in Fucus and Volvox with Monochromatic Light of Equal Intensities (1918)

Annie May Hurd Karrer (Note: Her surname by marriage is variously printed as Karrer or Hurd-Karrer) (July 28, 1893 in La Conner, Washington – May 15, 1984 in Orange County, Florida) was an American plant physiologist who worked for the United States Department of Agriculture.

== Biography ==
Annie May Hurd was born in 1893 in La Conner, Washington. She received an A.B. degree from the University of Washington in 1915 and an M.S. from that institution in 1917. She received her Ph.D. in plant physiology from the University of California, Berkeley in 1918. The same year that she received her doctoral degree, Hurd joined the staff of the United States Department of Agriculture (USDA), as a researcher for the Bureau of Plant Industry. She married physicist Sebastian Karrer in 1923. She continued her work for USDA, specializing in the improvement of cereal crops and the control of their diseases. Now as Annie Karrer, she rose to the position of associate plant physiologist in 1924; she was named plant physiologist in 1944, a position she held until 1949. Karrer published 16 papers in the USDA series of reports. Her articles appeared in journals including the American Journal of Botany, Plant Physiology, The Journal of General Physiology, and Soil Science. Three papers on the effects of selenium appeared in Science in the 1930s. Karrer was one of the first women botanists at Berkeley.

Karrer made a gift to the University of Washington that established the Sebastian Karrer Prize, in honor of her husband. First given in 1947, it is awarded to a senior or graduate student in the department of physics on the basis of need, scholarship, and good character.

== Selected publications ==
- Hurd-Karrer, Annie M.; Hasselbring, Heinrich (1927). Effect of Smut (Ustilago zeae) on the Sugar Content of Cornstalks. Washington, DC: United States Department of Agriculture.
- Nelson, E. M.; Hurd-Karrer, Annie M.; Robinson, W. O. (11 August 1933). "Selenium as an Insecticide". Science. 78 (2015): 124. Bibcode:1933Sci....78..124N. doi:10.1126/science.78.2015.124. JSTOR 1660359. PMID 17749823.
- Hurd-Karrer, Annie M. (15 December 1933). "Inhibition of Selenium Injury to Wheat Plants by Sulfur". Science. 78 (2033): 560. doi:10.1126/science.78.2033.560. JSTOR 1660847. PMID 17811938. S2CID 27666683.
- Hurd-Karrer, Annie M. (1936). Selenium Absorption by Plants and Their Resulting Toxicity to Animals. Washington, DC: Smithsonian Institution.
- Hurd-Karrer, Annie M.; Poos, F. W. (11 September 1936). "Toxicity of Selenium-Containing Plants to Aphids". Science. 84 (2176): 252. Bibcode:1936Sci....84..252H. doi:10.1126/science.84.2176.252. JSTOR 1661450. PMID 17831208.
- Hurd-Karrer, Annie M. (1940). Comparative Susceptibility of Crop Plants to Sodium Chlorate Injury. Technical Bulletin. Vol. 648. Washington, DC: United States Department of Agriculture. OCLC 09681625.
- Hurd-Karrer, Annie M. (1946). Relation of Soil Reaction to Toxicity and Persistence of Some Herbicides in Greenhouse Plots. Technical Bulletin. Vol. 911. Washington, DC: United States Department of Agriculture. OCLC 09713323.

== Bibliography ==
- Bailey, Martha J., ed. (1994), "Karrer, Annie May Hurd", American Women in Science: A Biographical Dictionary, Denver, CO: ABC-CLIO, p. 190, ISBN 0-87436-740-9
