= Annie Lemp Konta =

American writer and socialite

Annie Laurie Lemp Konta (died 1939) was an American writer and socialite.

== Biography ==
Annie Laurie Lemp was born to William J. Lemp and Julia Lemp in St. Louis, Missouri. Her family owned and her grandfather had founded the Lemp Brewing Company.

In 1905, a travel article she wrote appeared in the St. Louis Post-Dispatch.

Lemp Konta published a book and a pamphlet. Her book, The History of French Literature from the Oath of Strasburg to Chanticleer, was published in 1910. It was written for the general reader and received reviews that were largely positive. She wrote the book on a typewriter, without the help of writing assistants, over a ten-year period.

Her pamphlet, "A Plea for Moderation: Based Upon Observations of an American Woman in a Belligerent Country," was published after the beginning of World War I; it defended Wilhelm II and argued against Prohibition in the United States.

=== Personal life and death ===
She married Henry J. Meyer. They divorced in 1893 amidst allegations of Meyer's abuse. They had a custody battle over their son, Geoffrey.

She married Alexander Konta, a Hungarian-born banker and theatre producer, on October 8, 1895, at Ventnor on the Isle of Wight. She and Alexander Konta were separated by 1914. Alexander Konta died in 1933. Geoffrey, then known as Geoffrey Konta, became an attorney who worked for William Randolph Hearst.

She died of a stroke in December 1939 in New York City.

== Works ==
- The history of French literature from the Oath of Strasburg to Chanticler. D. Appleton and Company, 1910.
- "A plea for moderation, based upon observations of an American woman in a belligerent country". The Fatherland Corporation, 1915.
