= Annie Elsom =

New Zealand florist

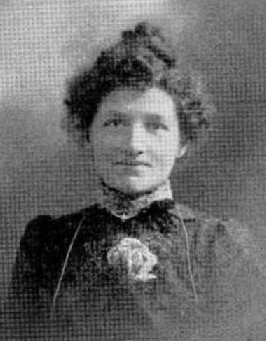
Elsom in c. 1903

Sarah Ann Elsom (née Read; 26 March 1867 – 17 November 1962) was a New Zealand florist.

== Biography ==
She was born in Dunedin, New Zealand, the daughter of Elizabeth Martin and her husband, William Read. Read was a gardener, seedsman, florist and fern collector. The family later changed the spelling of their surname to Reid.

In 1897, when Elsom was 30, she moved to Christchurch and established a successful floristry business in High Street called A. & S. Reid.

In March 1902 she married Edwin Elsom, a seedsman.
