= Annie Namala =

Indian activist

- Occupation: Education activist

Annie Namala is an Indian social activist and has been working for Dalit rights. She is the director of Centre for Social Equity and Inclusion. She is a vocal voice in the fight of untouchable movement. She was appointed as a member of the National Advisory Council for the implementation of the RTE act in 2010.

== Career ==
Annie Namala also worked with Solidarity Group for Children Against Discrimination and Exclusion (SGCADE).
