= Annie Vermeiren =

Belgian cyclist

Personal information
- Full name: Annie Vermeiren
- Born: 14 juli 1942 Turnhout

Cycling career
- Sport: Cycling
- Role: Rider

Annie Vermeiren is a Belgian former racing cyclist. She won the Belgian national road race title in 1961.
