= Annie Madsen =

Danish fencer

Personal information
- Born: 2 November 1945 (age 80) Frederiksberg, Denmark

Sport
- Sport: Fencing

Annie Madsen (born 2 November 1945) is a Danish fencer. She competed in the women's individual foil events at the 1972, 1976 and 1980 Summer Olympics.
