= Annie Mikpiga =

Canadian Inuk artist (1900–1984)

- Born: 1900; Akua, near Puvirnituq in Quebec
- Died: 1984 (aged 83–84)

Annie Mikpiga (1900–1984) was an Inuk artist who lived in Nunavik, Quebec. Her prints can be found in a number of public galleries and museums in Canada.

== Biography ==
Mikpiga was born in 1900 in Akua, near Puvirnituq in Nunavik. She lived there until her death in 1984.

Mikpiga was recognized as one of the first Inuit artists to experiment with printmaking. From the 1960s to early 1970s, she created about 60 stone-cut pieces. In 1973 she was the oldest participant in a batik workshop held at Puvirnituq. Her works are included in the collections of the National Gallery of Canada, the Canadian Museum of History, the Winnipeg Art Gallery, the Musée national des beaux-arts du Québec, the Musée de la civilisation and Museum Cerny in Bern, Switzerland.

== See also ==
- Inuit art
