= Annie Gregg Savigny =

Canadian novelist

Annie Gregg Savigny (née Ryan; c. 1838–1901) was a Canadian novelist, probably born in England. She was also an amateur astronomer and advocate of animal welfare.

== Life ==
Details of Savigny's life are scarce and inconsistent. She was probably born in England around 1838, although some sources report her birthplace as Ireland or Toronto.

In about 1878 she married a surveyor, Hugh Paine Savigny, and by 1886 she was living as a widow in Toronto, her husband having died in 1881. In 1888 Savigny resided on Isabella Street. She herself died on 10 July 1901 in Toronto.

== Writings ==
Savigny penned a series of successful novels, starting with A Heart-song of Today, an 1886 romance set in London and published by George Maclean Rose. It was followed two years later by A Romance of Toronto (published by William Briggs), which was ambiguously labeled, in small capitals as "founded on fact". Her third novel, Three Wedding Rings, appeared in 1892.

Savigny contributed to a number of periodicals and scientific publications. She presented at the Astronomical and Physical Society of Toronto and contributed articles to the society's journal on topics that included the planet Mars and observations taken at Arizona's Lowell Observatory.

== Young readers ==
Savigny also wrote several books targeted at young readers, on the topic of animal welfare. In 1895 she published Lion, the Mastiff (again with Briggs), a book that was imitative of Margaret Marshall Saunders's Beautiful Joe but still popular enough to be reprinted twice. Savigny was involved with the Toronto Humane Society and in 1898 she was commissioned by the society and the federal Department of Agriculture to write a children's book on the theme of kindness to animals. The result was Dick Niven and his Horse Nobby: a book and a set of 24 accompanying magic lantern slides.
