= Annie Jay =

French children's writer (born 1957)

Annie Jay (born in 1957) is a French children's writer. She writes historical and fantastic novels, in which one finds many details concerning the ages in which her novels take place.

== Works ==
- Complot à Versailles, 1993, Illustrated by Christophe Durual; Hachette, 1999, ISBN 978-2-01-020025-0
- A la poursuite d'Olympe, 1995; Hachette, 1999, ISBN 978-2-01-321049-2
- Le trône de Cléopâtre, 1996 Illustrated by Durual; Hachette-Jeunesse, 2002, ISBN 978-2-01-321962-4
- Fantôme en héritage, Hachette, 1997, ISBN 978-2-01-209775-9
- A la cour du Roi-Soleil, Illustrated by Claire Le Grand, Milan, 2002, ISBN 978-2-7459-0715-8
- L'esclave de Pompéi, Hachette Jeunesse, 2004, ISBN 978-2-01-322145-0
- Au nom du roi... Hachette Jeunesse, 2006, ISBN 978-2-01-321275-5
- La vengeance de Marie, Hachette, 2008, ISBN 978-2-01-322588-5
- L'inconnu de la Bastille, with Micheline Jeanjean, Hachette, 2008, ISBN 978-2-01-322591-5
- Adélaïde, Princesse espiègle, Illustrated by Alice Dufeu, Eveil et découvertes, 2010, ISBN 978-2-35366-020-9
- La dame aux élixirs, 2010
- Élisabeth, princesse à Versailles, 2016, Abin Michel Jeunesse, Illustrated by Ariane Delrieu.
