= Annie Ryder Gracey =

American writer and missionary

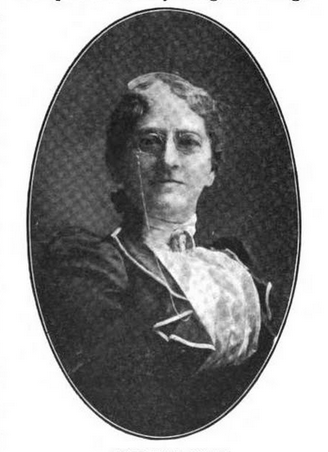
- Born: Annie Ryder; November 4, 1836; Christiana, Delaware, US
- Died: February 17, 1908 (aged 71); Clifton Springs, New York
- Education: Wilmington Female College
- Occupations: writer; missionary
- Spouse: John Talbot Gracey
- Writing career
- Pen name: Mrs. J. T. Gracey
- Notable works: Eminent Missionary Women; Woman's Medical Work in Mission Fields

Annie Ryder Gracey (née, Ryder; pen name, Mrs. J. T. Gracey; November 4, 1836 – February 17, 1908) was an American author and missionary of the long nineteenth century. She wrote two books based on her travels, Eminent Missionary Women and Woman's Medical Work in Mission Fields. The history of the literature produced by the Woman's Foreign Missionary Society of the Methodist Episcopal Church was closely linked with Gracey, who served as chairman of the committee on literature, and created missionary literature for the Society.

== Early life and education ==
Annie Ryder was born in Christiana, Delaware, November 4, 1836. She attended the Wilmington Female College, from which she graduated at the age of sixteen.

== Career ==
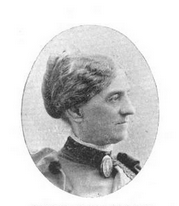
Annie Gracey

=== Missionary ===
For four years, she taught in her alma mater school. On March 10, 1858, at the age of 22, she married Rev. John Talbot Gracey. In 1861 they were appointed to India and stationed at Sitapur. There, Gracey gathered a few local girls together "forming the nucleus of the great work now carried on by the Woman's Foreign Missionary Society." On the veranda of their native house, Mrs. Gracey began the first girls' school in Sitapur. Eventually they added to this compound the Sitapur Girls' School with about 100 pupils and the Annie Ryder Gracey Home for missionaries. The Graceys subsequently settled in Bareilly, and then in Naini Tal, remaining in India for seven years, before returning to the US in 1868.

=== Activist ===
In 1868, Mrs. Gracey returned home with Dr. Gracey and when the Woman's Foreign Missionary Society was formed, in 1869, she at once identified herself with it, organizing the Philadelphia Branch. In 1878, she was elected recording secretary of the General Executive Committee, which office she filled for 24 years. In 1883, when Dr. Gracey returned to Genesee Conference, Mrs. Gracey was elected Conference Secretary, which office she held until 1905. Though she was a member of the First Church of Rochester, her influence was interdenominational. At the Ecumenical Conference in 1900, Gracey represented the women of Methodism, on the Committee. She was appointed because of her wide and profound knowledge of missions, to help prepare a seven years interdenominational course of study, covering the entire subject of Protestant Missions.

=== Literature of the Woman's Foreign Missionary Society ===
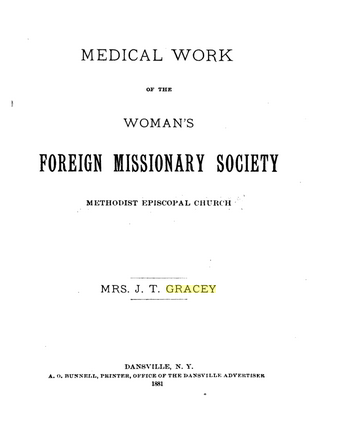
Medical Work of the Woman's Foreign Missionary Society

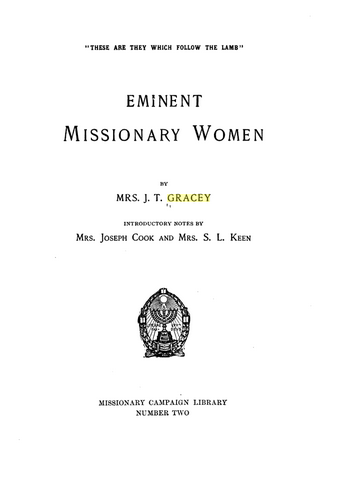
Eminent Missionary Women

The history of the literature of the Woman's Foreign Missionary Society was closely linked with Gracey, serving as chairman of the committee on literature and creating missionary literature for the Society. As early as 1877, she saw the demand for a larger provision for this department, and the leaflets, booklets and reports that she wrote and produced make an impressive record. Under Gracey's direction, it developed from nothing to millions of pages annually. In her home, for years, she ran a "leaflet room" devoted to the Society's publications. Not only did she write many of the leaflets, but she also attended to the printing and mailing, sending every package herself for many years. The Study under her editorial charge became an established part in missionary education. An excellent record of woman's medical work in mission fields was written by her. Woman's Medical Work in Mission Fields, and she also published a book on Eminent Missionary Women, besides doing much general writing for various periodicals. As recording secretary of the General Executive Committee, a position she held for 223 years, she prepared the Annual Report of the Society, which required intimate knowledge of the details of the work and a lot of time in its preparation. She also furnished a quadrennial statement to the General Conference of the work in all parts of the world.

== Personal life ==
The son, W. A. Gracey, was editor of the Geneva Daily Times. There were three daughters, including Lilly Ryder Gracey, who had wide experience as a newspaper writer; Frances Ida Gracey, and Blanche Gracey, who died as a baby. Gracey died at Clifton Springs, New York, February 17, 1908.

== Selected works ==
- 1881, Medical work of the Woman's Foreign Missionary Society, Methodist Episcopal Church : with supplement
- 1898, Eminent missionary women
