= Annie Weetaltuk =

First Indigenous Canadian flight attendant

Anniapik Weetaltuk (Annie) was Canada's first Indigenous flight attendant, hired by the Manitoba-based Transair in 1958.

She was born in 1935 on Cape Hope Islands, also known as Nunaaluk, in James Bay, one of twelve children born to Arctic whale hunters. Weetaltuk's grandfather, George Weetaltuk, founded the community in the 1920s. The southern location of this area led to a relationship with surrounding Cree communities, giving her the opportunity to learn the Cree language. She also spoke fluent Inuktitut, French and English.

Annie attended a Fort George Catholic school run by Grey Nuns and Oblate Fathers before enrolling in a nursing course at the Hamilton Sanitorium in 1951, earning a nursing assistant diploma. She worked at Ottawa Civic Hospital, The Bell Telephone Hospital at Great Whale and Montreal General Hospital. She also worked aboard the Department of Transport's medical ship C.D. Howe, which was used to test and transport Inuit tuberculosis patients. She worked as both a nurse and a registrar for the Department of Northern Affairs.

Weetaltuk's employment at Transair led to public interest and media attention. She was employed there for two years before becoming pregnant and leaving to Great Whale River to live with her family.

In Great Whale River, Annie worked for the Northern Affairs Department in charge of Eskimo handicrafts. There, she met Terry Whitfield, an Australian mechanic hired by Marconi. When they began a romantic relationship, Whitfield was fired. The two married, but later divorced. Weetaltuk later married a man named Bill Shields, who worked with the Tuna Fishing Ships Company.

Weetaltuk later worked for the Government of Quebec in Montreal and Great Whale.

Her son Mike Shields also worked in aviation, being employed by Air Inuit and also managing the Kuujjuarapik Airport.
