= Annie Latham Bartlett =

American sculptor (1865–1948)

- Born: December 6, 1865; Grafton, West Virginia
- Died: April 21, 1948 (aged 82); Buckhannon, West Virginia

Annie Virginia Latham Bartlett (December 6, 1865 – April 21, 1948) was an American sculptor from West Virginia whose works were exhibited at the New York World's Fair in 1939.

== Early life and education ==
She was born in 1865 to General George R. Latham and Caroline A. Thayer Latham. Her father was a Congressman and later the U.S. consul to Australia. She married Leonidas Bartlett in 1885. She attended the Maryland Institute at Baltimore in 1922 to study the fine arts.

== Career ==
Bartlett took up sculpting after her schooling. She developed a process which hardened local clays without firing them, mixing them with her own ingredients. She would then paint and varnish her works so that they would resemble colored porcelain. Many of her subjects were traditional busts, in addition to figures which related to West Virginia's culture and history. She would also make figurines of some of her neighbors. These neighbor portraits, with names like "Schoolma'am" and "Madonna of the Mountains" were featured in an exhibit at the International Institute in Pittsburgh Pennsylvania in 1936. Her work and similar have been described as "Southern Highland Potteries" after Allen H. Eaton's book Handicrafts of the Southern Highlands which described works by Bartlett and others.

Her work is held in The Johnston Collection in Spartanburg, South Carolina.
