= Annie Hewlett =

Canadian writer and artist

- Born: Annie Elizabeth May Brown; 25 February 1887; Sutton-on-Hull, Yorkshire, England
- Died: 1974 (aged 86–87); Winnipeg, MB

Annie Hewlett (25 February 1887 – 1974), was a writer and artist, originally from England, who lived in Saskatchewan.

== Biography ==
Annie Elizabeth May Maisie Brown was born on 25 February 1887 in Sutton-on-Hull, Yorkshire, England. She started her journalistic career when she was twelve when she started a local newspaper. The paper continued running for years after she left England. As an adult in Yorkshire Hewlett worked as a teacher after training in London where she remained until she emigrated to Canada in 1911.

She initially settled in Alberta and Hewlett taught in a small rural school near Kitscoty. Hewlett then married Arthur Hewlett, whom she met on board the ship to Canada. He had settled in Cannington Manor, Saskatchewan. Hewlett created the Saskatchewan Homemaker's Club which went on to become the Women's Institute in an effort to improve the lives of the women on the farms. Hewlett wrote for women in the press in both the UK and Canada. She wrote the column Down on the Farm for The Saskatchewan Farmer ran for years. She focused on articles which emphasized the principal of the women to have interests and rights. She was a member of the Canadian Women's Press Club. Hewlett was also a talented artist who usually worked in watercolours.

Hewlett published her memoir, A Too Short Yesterday, when she was 83. The family home is now a museum.
