= Annie Cuyt =

Belgian mathematician

Annie A. M. Cuyt (born 1956) is a Belgian computational mathematician known for her work on exponential analysis, Padé approximants, continued fractions, numerical analysis, and related topics. She is a professor at the University of Antwerp, an honorary professor at the University of Stirling and a member of the Royal Flemish Academy of Belgium for Science and the Arts.

== Education and career ==
Cuyt was born on 27 May 1956 in Elisabethstad (now Lubumbashi), in the Belgian Congo. She earned her doctor degree at the University of Antwerp in 1982, maxima cum laude with the felicitations of the jury. Her dissertation, Padé approximants for operators: theory and applications, was published in the Springer LNM series. She was a postdoctoral researcher with support from the Alexander von Humboldt Foundation, and completed a habilitation in 1986.

Until October 2021, she was a professor in the Department of Mathematics and Computer Science at the University of Antwerp, where she led the computational mathematics group. Since October 2021, she is emerita professor at the same university. In 2023 she was appointed as honorary professor in the Division of Computing Science and Mathematics of the University of Stirling.

In 2005 Cuyt installed the first government funded computer cluster in Flanders dedicated to general (as opposed to topical) research and development activities. At the time it was also Belgium's largest HPC cluster. The initiative later evolved to the government funded Vlaams Supercomputer Centrum, of which Cuyt stayed an active member of the Board of Directors till 2021.

== Books ==
Cuyt is the author or coauthor of:

- Padé Approximants for Operators: Theory and Applications (Lecture Notes in Mathematics 1065, Springer, 1984)
- Nonlinear Methods in Numerical Analysis (with Luc Wuytack, North-Holland Mathematics Studies 136, North-Holland, 1987)
- Handbook of Continued Fractions for Special Functions (with Vigdis Brevik Petersen, Brigitte Verdonk, Haakon Waadeland, and William B. Jones, Springer, 2008)

== Recognition ==
Cuyt was elected to the Royal Flemish Academy of Belgium for Science and the Arts in 2013 (class of natural sciences).

The 4th Dolomites Workshop on Constructive Approximation and Applications, in 2016, and a special issue of the Dolomites Research Notes on Approximation, published in 2017, were dedicated to Cuyt in honor of her 60th birthday.
