= Annie Lin =

American singer-songwriter

- Born: January 14, 1980 (age 46); Taiwan
- Education: Rice University (BA); University of Houston (JD)
- Occupation: Lawyer

Annie Lin (born January 14, 1980) is a Taiwanese-American lawyer in entertainment matters. Lin was also a US-based songwriter and the founder of the Ariadne Record label.

== Early life and education ==
On January 14, 1980, Lin was born in Taiwan. Lin moved to Southern California by the age of six.

Lin majored in English at Rice University while she balanced a busy national touring schedule (100+ dates/year) with classes. After forming the Ariadne Record label in the year 2000, she released her first studio album in 2001 Kicking Stars. The album was made up of original acoustic pop songs which showed a strong Lisa Loeb influence.

== Career ==
Annie soon expanded Ariadne to a full-service label, booking other bands and launching the Asian-American Songwriters Showcase, an event she created to spotlight Asian American talent. The AASS toured nationwide from 2001 to 2003 and featured such artists as Vienna Teng and Emm Gryner.

East Coast Songs, a collection of music written on the road, was released in 2002 and received positive reviews from the Houston Chronicle, Boston Phoenix, and Village Voice. In 2003, Annie graduated from Rice and began law school. Truck Was Struck was released on April 16, 2004, becoming Annie's best selling effort thus far.

Annie was also a judge for the 7th annual Independent Music Awards to support independent artists' careers.

Annie received her J.D. degree from the University of Houston. In November 2006, Billboard magazine reported that Annie had been promoted to director of creative licensing at The Orchard (music label).

Annie has started her own law practice in entertainment matters out of San Francisco.

In April 2016, Lin became the General Counsel at Loudr.
