= Annie B. Bond =

American writer

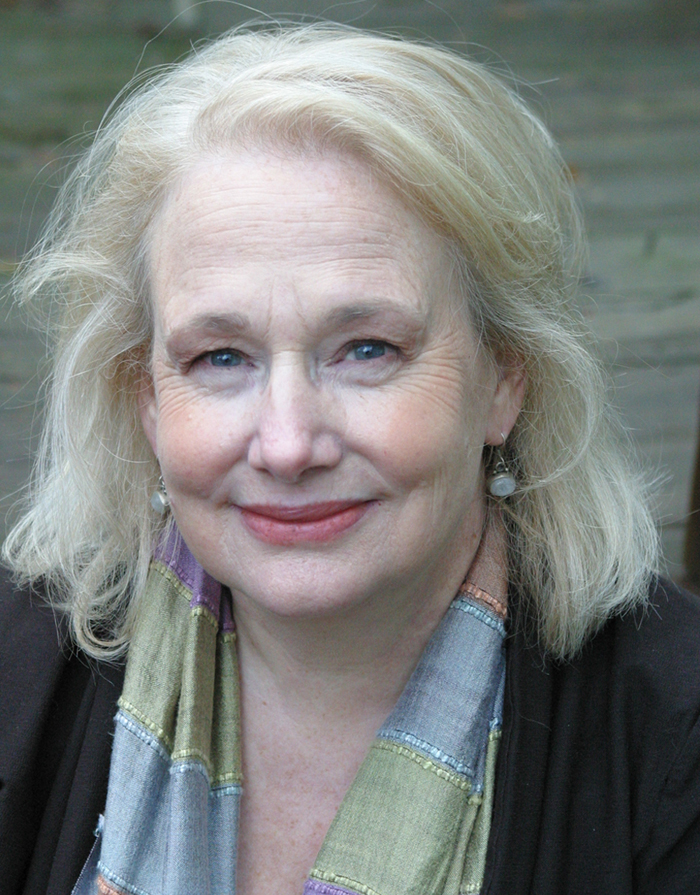
- Annie B. Bond at her house in Rhinebeck, NY.
- Born: 1953 (age 72–73); Rhinebeck, New York, United States
- Occupations: Green-living advocate, author
- Known for: Environmental activism
- Notable work: Clean and Green: The Complete Guide to Non-Toxic and Environmentally Safe Housekeeping
- Website: www.anniebbond.com

Annie B. Bond (born 1953) is an American sustainable living advocate and author from Rhinebeck, New York.

== Books ==
Bond has written several books on green living. Her book True Food was published in 2010 by National Geographic and won the 2010 Gourmand Award in the Lifestyle, Body, and World category for Best Health and Nutrition Books.

== Career ==
Bond is an outspoken advocate for environmentally friendly living. She founded and served as editor-in-chief of Green Alternatives for Health and the Environment, a magazine published from 1989 to 1994. From 1994 to 1996, she was editor-in-chief of The Green Guide, published by Mothers & Others for a Livable Planet, later acquired by National Geographic.

Bond has written blog posts and articles for Intent, Body & Soul, and other publications. She collaborated with alternative medicine specialist, Deepak Chopra, on a featured blog for The Huffington Post.

== Bibliography ==
- Clean and Green: The Complete Guide to Non-Toxic and Environmentally Safe Housekeeping, 1990.
- The Green Kitchen Handbook: Practical Advice, References, & Sources for Transforming the Center of Your Home into a Healthy, Livable Place, 1997 with a foreword by Meryl Streep.
- Better Basics for the Home: Simple Solutions for Less Toxic Living, 1999
- Home Enlightenment: Practical, Earth Friendly Advice for Creating a Nurturing, Healthy, and Toxin Free Home and Lifestyle, 2005.
- True Food: Eight Simple Steps to a Healthier You, 2010 in collaboration with Melissa Breyer and Wendy Gordon, foreword by Alice Waters.
