= Annie Wang =

Annie Wang may refer to:

- Annie Wang (entrepreneur) (born 1989), co-founder of online magazine Her Campus
- Annie Wang (chess player) (born 2002), American chess player
