= Annie Curtis =

Irish immunologist

- Education: Trinity College Dublin; University of Pennsylvania
- Awards: L'Oréal-UNESCO Award For Women in Science (2017)
- Scientific career
- Fields: Immunology
- Workplaces: Royal College of Surgeons in Ireland
- Website: www.curtisclocklab.com

Annie Curtis is an Irish immunologist at the Royal College of Surgeons in Ireland whose career has spanned academia, public sector and industry. She studies how the power of the body clock can be harnessed to control inflammatory diseases.

== Education ==
Curtis completed a B.A. in genetics in Trinity College Dublin (1994–1998) and conducted her PhD in the laboratory of Prof. Garret FitzGerald in Pharmacology (2001 – 2006) at University of Pennsylvania. Here she became aware of body clocks and found out how the clock controls cardiovascular function.

== Career ==
Curtis was recruited to GlaxoSmithKline in Philadelphia as a principal scientist directly after completing her PhD, where she led a small research team researching biomarkers for cardiovascular risk between 2006–2008. In 2008 she was recruited as Scientific Programme Manager for Science Foundation Ireland (SFI) until 2010 when she was employed as Medical Advisor for Immunotherapeutics with Bristol-Myers Squibb.

In 2011, she joined the laboratory of Luke O'Neill in biochemistry at Trinity College Dublin. In 2014, she was awarded an SFI Starting Investigator Research Grant to establish a group studying the impact of clocks on the immune system. Curtis joined the Royal College of Surgeons in Ireland as a research lecturer in Molecular and Cellular Therapeutics in August 2016. Her work has led to the understanding of mechanisms inducing chronic inflammatory diseases like multiple sclerosis which is linked to the disruption of the body clock.

== Publications ==
- Curtis, Anne M.; Seo, Sang-beom; Westgate, Elizabeth J.; Rudic, Radu Daniel; Smyth, Emer M.; Chakravarti, Debabrata.; FitzGerald, Garret A.; McNamara, Peter., "HAT-dependent chromatin remodeling and the vascular clock", American Society for Biochemistry and Molecular Biology 2003
- Rudic, R Daniel; McNamara, Peter; Curtis, Anne-Maria; Boston, Raymond C.; Panda, Satchidananda; Hogenesch, John B.; FitzGerald, Garret A., "BMAL1 and CLOCK, two essential components of the circadian clock, are involved in glucose homeostasis", PLoS Biology 2004; 11: e377
- Curtis, Anne M.; Cheng, Yan; Kapoor, Shiv; Reilly, Dermot; Price, Tom S.; FitzGerald, Garret A., "Circadian variation of blood pressure and the vascular response to asynchronous stress", National Academy of Sciences 2007; 104; 3450-3455
- FitzGerald, G.A.; Curtis, A.M., "Central and peripheral clocks in cardiovascular and metabolic function", Annals of Medicine 2006; 38: 552-559
- Tannahill, G.M.; Curtis, A.M.; Adamik J., Palsson-McDermott, E.M.; McGettrick, A.F.; Goel G.; Frezza, C.; Bernard, N.J.; Kelly, B.; Foley, N.H.; Zheng, L.; Gardet, A.; Tong, Z.; Jany, S.S.; Corr, S.C.; Haneklaus, M.; Caffrey, B.E.; Pierce, K.; Walmsley, S.; Beasley, F.C.; Cummins, E.; Nizet, V.; Whyte, M.; Taylor, C.T.; Lin, H.; Masters S.L.; Gottlieb E.; Kelly V.P.; Clish C.; Auron P.E.; Xavier R.J.; O'Neill L.A.J., "Succinate is an inflammatory signal that induces IL-1β through HIF-1α", Nature, 2013; 496, 238.
- Curtis, Anne M.; Bellet, Marina M.; Sassone-Corsi, Paolo; O'Neill, Luke A.J., "Circadian clock proteins and immunity", Immunity 2014; 40: 178-186
- Palsson-McDermott, Eva M.; Curtis, Anne M.; Goel, Gautam; Lauterbach, Mario A.R.; Sheedy, Frederick J.;Gleeson, Laura E.; van den Bosch, Mirjam W.M.; Quinn, Susan R.; Domingo-Fernandez, Raquel; Johnston, Daniel G.W.; Jiang, Jian-kang; Israelsen, William J.; Keane, Joseph; Thomas, Craig; Clish, Clary; Vander Heiden, Matthew; Xavier, Ramnik J.; O'Neill, Luke A.J., "Pyruvate kinase M2 regulates Hif-1α activity and IL-1β induction and is a critical determinant of the warburg effect in LPS-activated macrophages", Cell Metabolism 2015; 21: 65-80
- Curtis A.M., Early, J.O.; "Immunometabolism: Is it under the eye of the clock?", Seminars in immunology 2016; 28: 478-490

== Awards ==
2017: L'Oréal-UNESCO For Women in Science UK & Ireland Fellowships 2017 Fellowship, L'Oréal-UNESCO

2012: Winner, Roche Medal, Researcher of the Year, Trinity Biomedical Science Institute, Roche Pharmaceuticals

2006: Arteriosclerosis, Thrombosis and Vascular Biology (ATVB) Junior Investigator Award for Women 2006, ATVB
