= Annie Charlotte Catharine Aldrich =

British novelist (1842–1916)

- Born: 1842; The Crown Colony of the Bahama Islands
- Died: 13 November 1916 (aged 73–74)

Annie Charlotte Catharine Aldrich (1842 – 13 November 1916) was a British novelist who published under the name Catharine Childar.

Annie Charlotte Catharine Aldrich was born in 1842 in The Bahamas. She published four novels using her pseudonym Childar, which she created as an anagram of her last name. Her novel The Double Dutchman (1884) concerned a woman, Mrs. Hazelwood, and her three daughters.

Aldrich met novelist Samuel Butler in Greece in 1895, though a mutual friend, Charles Gogin. Henry Festing Jones published excerpts from Aldrich's diary about their brief time in Greece in his 1919 biography of Butler.

Annie Charlotte Catharine Aldrich died on 13 November 1916.

== Bibliography ==
- The Future Marquis. 3 vol. London: Hurst and Blackett, 1881.
- Daisy Beresford. 3 vol. London: Hurst and Blackett, 1882.
- A Maid Called Barbara. 3 vol. London: Hurst and Blackett, 1883.
- The Double Dutchman. 3 vol. London: Hurst and Blackett, 1884.
