= Annie Lloyd Evans =

Welsh educator and scholar

Annie Lloyd Evans (also Lloyd-Evans; 18 December 1873 – 20 February 1938) was a Welsh educator, principal of a teachers' college in London, and a scholar of women's higher education.

== Early life and education ==
Annie Lloyd Evans was born in Evesham, Worcestershire, the eldest daughter of John Lloyd Evans, a Welsh journalist, justice of the peace and newspaper proprietor, and Annie Pierce Lloyd Evans OBE, a philanthropist and newspaper proprietor. She was baptised 18 January 1874 at St Lawrence's Church, Evesham. The family later moved to Warwick, where her father served as mayor and her parents ran the Warwick Advertiser. She was educated at the Kings High School for Girls in Warwick before attending the University of St. Andrews as one of its first female students.

== Career ==
Lloyd Evans taught briefly at Llanidloes Intermediate School and Blackburn High School, before accepting the job of "lady superintendent" (vice principal) at Church of Ireland Training College, Dublin in 1898. Her sister Mary Lloyd Evans, also educated at St. Andrews, succeeded her in the job. In 1908, the London County Council appointed Annie Lloyd Evans principal of the Fulham Training School for Women Teachers.

She was a charter member of the general committee of the Training College Association when it formed in 1917. In 1929, she became a member of the Central Advisory Committee to evaluate teacher training programmes in England. Lloyd Evans presented her experiences and research about teacher training at academic conferences and journals, and at least once (on 16 January 1935) on an episode of Children's Hour on BBC Radio. Her 1936 article in the British Journal of Educational Psychology, "The Place of Psychology in the Training of Teachers," is still cited for the snapshot it provides of a profession in the midst of change.

She died at the Beaumont Nursing Home in London, aged 64, and was buried in Warwick.
