= Annie Matumbi =

Malawian musician

- Born: Chiyanjano Muheziwa; November 10, 1987 (age 38); Salima District, Malawi
- Genres: Afro-soul; Afrobeat
- Occupations: Musician songwriter producer television broadcaster
- Years active: 2000–present

Chiyanjano Muheziwa popularly known as Annie Matumbi, and sometimes Nyakwawa, is a Malawian veteran musician, tv presenter, actor and politician. He has released several successful singles and albums, including "Marshup", "Free Major 1", and "Malawi Must Be Saved". His music has resonated with audiences, making him a household name in Malawi.

Apart from being a musician, Muheziwa is also a TV presenter for Luso TV, hosting various shows and events. This has helped him build a strong on-screen presence and connect with a broader audience.

== Background ==
=== Early life and music career ===
Muheziwa was born in Salima District in Malawi. He started implemeting music at a young age. He later moved to Lilongwe the capital of Malawi to purse his career in Music. Under his name, he has released several singles, including "Marshup", "Free Major 1", "Julie Part 10 (Yao Version)", "Malawi Must Be Saved", and "Mafunyeta Tribute", as well as numerous albums.

In 2017, Muheziwa claimed he was the father of Malawi urban music.

=== Political career ===
Muheziwa stood for a parliamentary seat in the 2019 general election under the Democratic Progressive Party (DPP) for the Lilongwe City Southwest constituency.

=== Television and acting ===
Muheziwa is also a TV presenter and actor who appeared in the Malawian movie production "Julie and Vivian".
