= Annie Anzieu =

French psychoanalyst (1924–2019)

- Born: April 1924
- Died: 10 November 2019 (aged 95); Paris, France
- Occupations: Psychoanalyst; Essayist

Annie Anzieu (April 1924 – 10 November 2019) was a French psychoanalyst and essayist who published a series of psychoanalytic studies.

== Biography ==
Anzieu earned a master's degree in philosophy and in speech-language pathology. She started as a speech therapist at Pitié-Salpêtrière Hospital. Anzieu later became an honorary member of the French Psychoanalytic Association. She co-founded the Association for Child Psychoanalysis with Florence Guignard in 1984, and the European Society for Child and Adolescent Psychoanalysis (SEPEA) ten years later. She directed the department of child psychiatry at the Pitié-Salpêtre Hospital.

Anne Anzieu was the wife of Didier Anzieu. She died on 10 November 2019.

== Works ==
- Psychanalyse et langage. Du corps à la parole (1977)
- La Femme sans qualité. Esquisse psychanalytique de la féminité (1989)
- Le Jeu en psychothérapie de l'enfant (2000)
- Le Travail du dessin en psychothérapie de l'enfant (2012)
- Le Travail du psychothérapeute d'enfant (2014)
