= Annie Bell Pettway =

American artist (1930–2003)

Annie Bell Pettway (1930–2003) was an American artist. She is associated with the Gee's Bend quilting collective, along with her daughter Belinda Pettway.

== Early life ==
Annie Bell Pettway was the oldest daughter, and second oldest child, of Clement Pettway and Cherokee Pettway. Her father became sick and inexplicably immobile when Annie was six years old. She and her oldest brother, Eddie Lee Pettway, took on all of the farm's responsibilities at this time because their father required their mother's around-the-clock care. She recalls being sick for most of her childhood.

She married her close childhood friend, John L. Pettway, when she was eighteen and he was twenty-one years old. They raised seven children total—four boys and three girls. Two of her sons live in Connecticut and two live in Gee's Bend. Of her three daughters, one lives in Georgia, one lives in New York, and one, Belinda Pettway, remains in Gee's Bend.

Annie Bell Pettway died in 2003.

== Work ==
Pettway's mother, Cherokee, taught her to quilt by re-purposing used work pants. She learned to quilt at six years old, and passed down the tradition to her daughters.
