= Annie Andrews (disambiguation) =

Annie Andrews is an American pediatrician and politician.

Ann, Anne or Annie Andrews may refer to:

- Annie Dale Biddle Andrews (1885–1940), American pioneer mathematician and academic
- Ann Andrews (1890–1986), American stage actress
- Annie B. Andrews (born 1959), American rear admiral and aviation administrator
- Anne M. Andrews, American biochemist and academic since 1990s
