= Annie Guo VanDan =

American journalist

Annie Guo VanDan is an American journalist. She is co-founder and president of Asian Avenue Magazine, a magazine published since 2006 that covers the Asian American, Native Hawaiian, and Pacific Islander communities of Denver, Colorado. Since 2009, she has been the founding executive director of Colorado Asian Culture and Education Network, a 501c3 nonprofit organization that strengthens and uplifts Colorado’s Asian American, Native Hawaiian, and Pacific Islander (AANHPI) communities by creating spaces of belonging for a more equitable and connected future. In 2025, she helped to establish the Social Fabric Hub, a pan-Asian community center and event space in Centennial, Colorado.

In 2021, she became a Maynard Institute Fellow as part of the Robert C. Maynard Institute for Journalism Education, which aims to promote equity and diversity in journalism. In 2021, she also served as the Project Manager for Colorado Equity Compass, dedicated to improving health equity through data storytelling, which entails presenting information in accessible visual and narrative forms for policy-makers and the public.

== Family and education ==
VanDan's family immigrated from Taipei, Taiwan to Colorado in 1987. After graduating from John F. Kennedy High School in Denver as valedictorian in 2004, she attended the University of Missouri and studied journalism and strategic communications. She later earned an MBA from the University of Colorado Denver. She lives with her husband Danny VanDan, an optometrist and owner of Milestones Eyecare, in Englewood, Colorado.

== Journalism and health equity ==
In 2006, VanDan co-founded Asian Avenue Magazine with her mother, Christina Yutai Guo, the first and only print journal at the time that featured the stories of Asian American, Native Hawaiian, and Pacific Islanders (AANHPIs) in Colorado. In its print form and associated website, Asian Avenue covers AANHPI people, businesses and cultural activities (such as the Denver Cherry Blossom Festival), along with issues of concern within the AAPI community such as LGBT rights, health disparities, changing patterns of immigration, vaccine hesitancy, and, in 2021, anti-Asian racism and xenophobia and the COVID-19 Hate Crimes Act. The magazine's website also has sections devoted to food trends, new books by or about AAPI people, and films.

Under the leadership of VanDan and her mother, Asian Avenue has since 2009 presented an annual award called the Asian American Hero of Colorado, which recognizes AAPI leaders for work in the community. In October 2016 Asian Avenue received the Denver Mayor's Diversity & Inclusion Awards for the "innovation" category. They have sponsored an annual lunar new year banquet in Denver which in January 2020 welcomed more than three hundred guests. They have also sponsored a program to promote leadership roles among AAPI women and female students. In June 2020 the magazine published articles about the Black Lives Matter movement and expressed "unequivocal support" for it while also discussing related issues in anti-Asian violence and racism in Colorado. In January 2021, Asian Avenue received a Martin Luther King Jr. Business Award in recognition of these efforts.

In addition to her journalism, VanDan has worked for the Colorado Department of Public Health and Environment in the Office of Health Equity and Maternal and Child Health. She also managed communications for a nonprofit medical and mental health clinic in Denver that offers services to refugees and immigrants. In 2021 she became a Project Manager for Colorado Equity Compass, an initiative funded by The Colorado Trust, dedicated to improving health equity through "data storytelling": presenting information in accessible visual and narrative forms for policy-makers and members of the public. Among the areas she covers for Colorado Equity Compass is southeast Colorado Springs, which has one of the most racially and culturally diverse populations in the state, with 42% of its children living below the federal poverty line and rates of obesity, diabetes, smoking, and self-reported mental health issues that exceed the state average.

VanDan is an expert on using health data to cover health- and health-policy-related news, and on mapping and presenting data by zip codes in ways that can "amplify the voices of the community to go along with the data." She presented her findings at the Culture of Data Conference organized by the Colorado Public Health Association in January 2021. She also serves on the Advisory Board for the Colorado Lotus Project, a groundbreaking data research initiative focused on understanding the experiences and needs of Colorado’s AANHPI communities.

== Awards ==
In 2021, VanDan was a part of the Maynard Institute Fellowship led by the Robert C. Maynard Institute for Journalism Education, within its "Media Entrepreneur" track. She was the recipient of the Quintin Hope Metrics Award.
