= Annie Wan =

Chinese artist

Annie Wan Lai-kuen (尹麗娟; born 1961) is a Hong Kong contemporary artist known for her ceramics works.

== Life ==
Wan was born in 1961 in Hong Kong. In 1982 she received a Diploma in Design from Hong Kong Polytechnic University, followed by a BA in Fine Arts from the Chinese University of Hong Kong in 1996. In 1999 she earned a Master of Fine Arts from the Chinese University of Hong Kong.

== Exhibitions ==
Solo exhibitions

- 2013 “Text · Book”, 1a Space, Hong Kong
- 2003 “Moulding World – Ceramic World by Annie Wan”, Hong Kong Visual Arts Centre, Hong Kong
- 2005 “Moulding World – A Summer in Denmark”, the Habitus, Hong Kong
- 2001 “Rediscovery”, the First Institute of Art and Design Gallery, Hong Kong
- 2000 “Blue and White”, Gallerie Martini, Hong Kong
- 1999 “Longing and Rediscovery, Hui Gallery, CUHK
- 1998 “Ceramic Works by Wan Lai Kuen”, Hong Kong Cultural Centre, Hong Kong

Biennial / Triennale

Year	Country		Title of the Artwork	Remark
2003	Hong Kong	Hong Kong Art Biennial	Monument / Anagama in Shigaraki	Awarded
2019	Japan	Hong Kong House at Echigo-Tsumari Art Triennale	Give Us This Day Our Daily Bread	Awarded
2016	Korea	Gwangju Biennale	Every Day A Rainbow	Awarded

== Collections ==
Wan's work is included in the permanent collections of the University of Salford and the Burger Collection. Her works are also held by the collections of The Hong Kong Museum of Art, the Hong Kong Heritage Museum, the New Taipei City Yingge Ceramics Museum, Taiwan and Guldageraard, Denmark.

== Awards ==
Year	Organization/ Institutions	Awards
1998	Philippe Charriol Foundation Art Competition	Champion, Sculpture.
2018	Hong Kong Art Development Council	Hong Kong Art Development Awards 2018, Artist of the Year (Visual Arts）

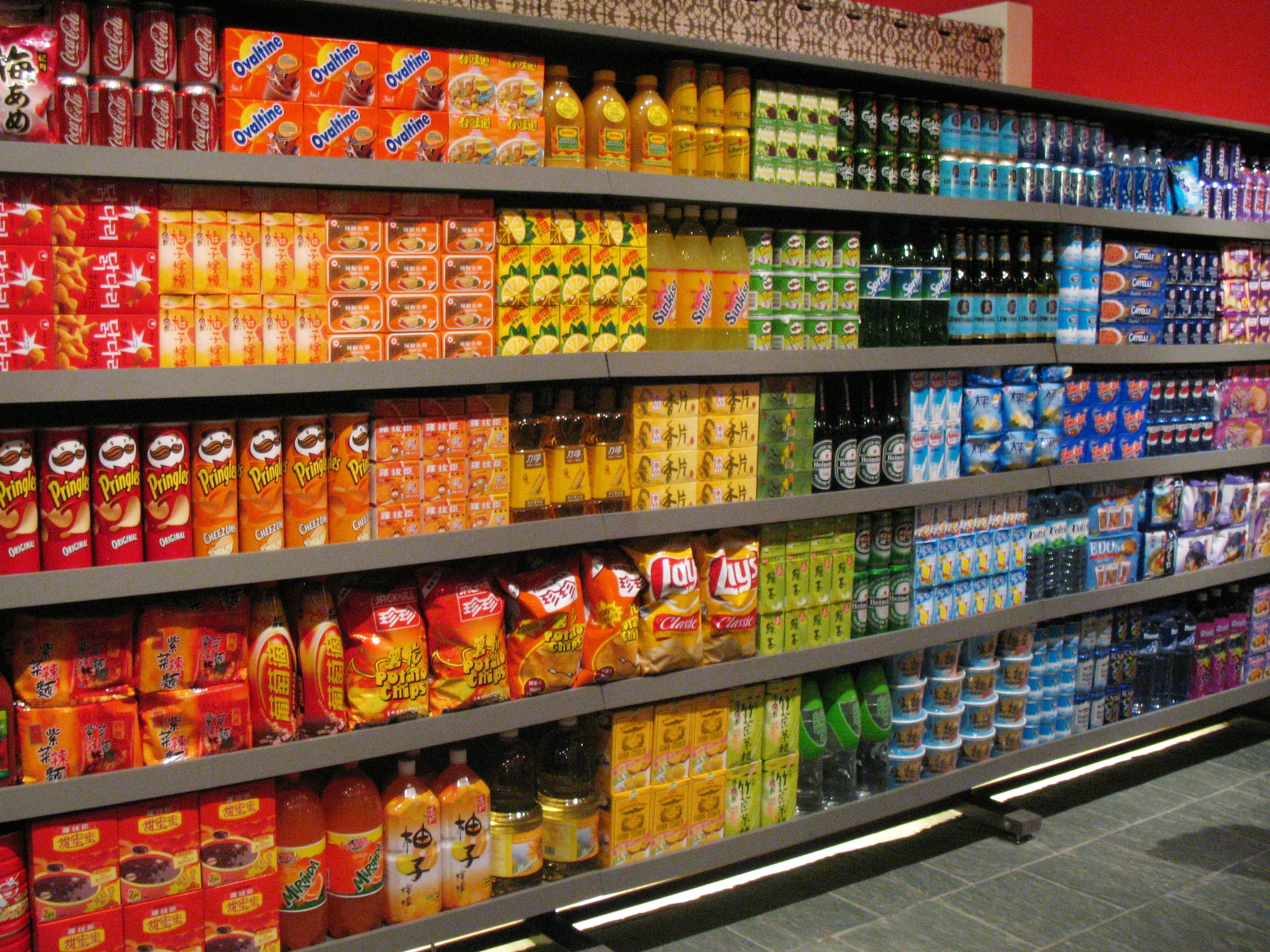
Installation by Annie Wan at the MegArt Store exhibition at the Hong Kong Heritage Museum
