= Annie Dixon =

English painter

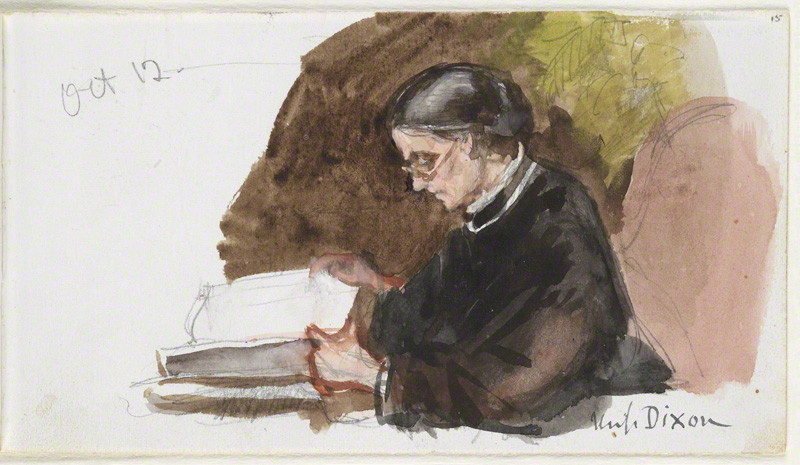
- Annie Dixon by Louisa Anne Beresford, Marchioness of Waterford (1887)
- Born: 1817; Horncastle, Lincolnshire
- Died: 15 February 1901 (aged 83–84)
- Known for: Portrait miniature

Annie Dixon (c. 1817 - 1901) was a 19th-century English miniature portrait painter. From 1859, she was commissioned for numerous royal portraits by Queen Victoria.

== Biography ==
Dixon was the eldest daughter of seven children (two sons, five daughters) born to a corn chandler in Horncastle, Lincolnshire. She began working with water-colour by the mid-19th century, and completed portraits in Horncastle. She was instructed by Magdalene Dalton (née Ross), sister of portrait painter William Charles Ross. Despite this instruction, Dixon did not spend much time studying art, copying pictures, or pursuing further education. Dixon worked in Hull, on the Isle of Wight, and in London until the end of the 19th century. From 1844 to 1893, Dixon displayed 222 portraits at the Royal Academy. In 1859, Dixon received her first Royal commission from Queen Victoria, to paint a miniature of Princess Blanche d'Orléans (1857-1932) at Claremont. A number of her portraits remain in the Royal Collection. The royal favour she received from Queen Victoria allowed Dixon to earn further commissions from nobility.

Her works are noted for having characteristics of using warm flesh tones (especially in the forehead) and yellow in the sky. Dixon occasionally used gilded backgrounds in her work. Her skill at capturing likenesses meant that she had a successful career during a time when many portraitists were facing competition from the advent of photography.

Dixon died on 15 February 1901 at the age of 83 and was buried in Horncastle cemetery.

== Gallery ==
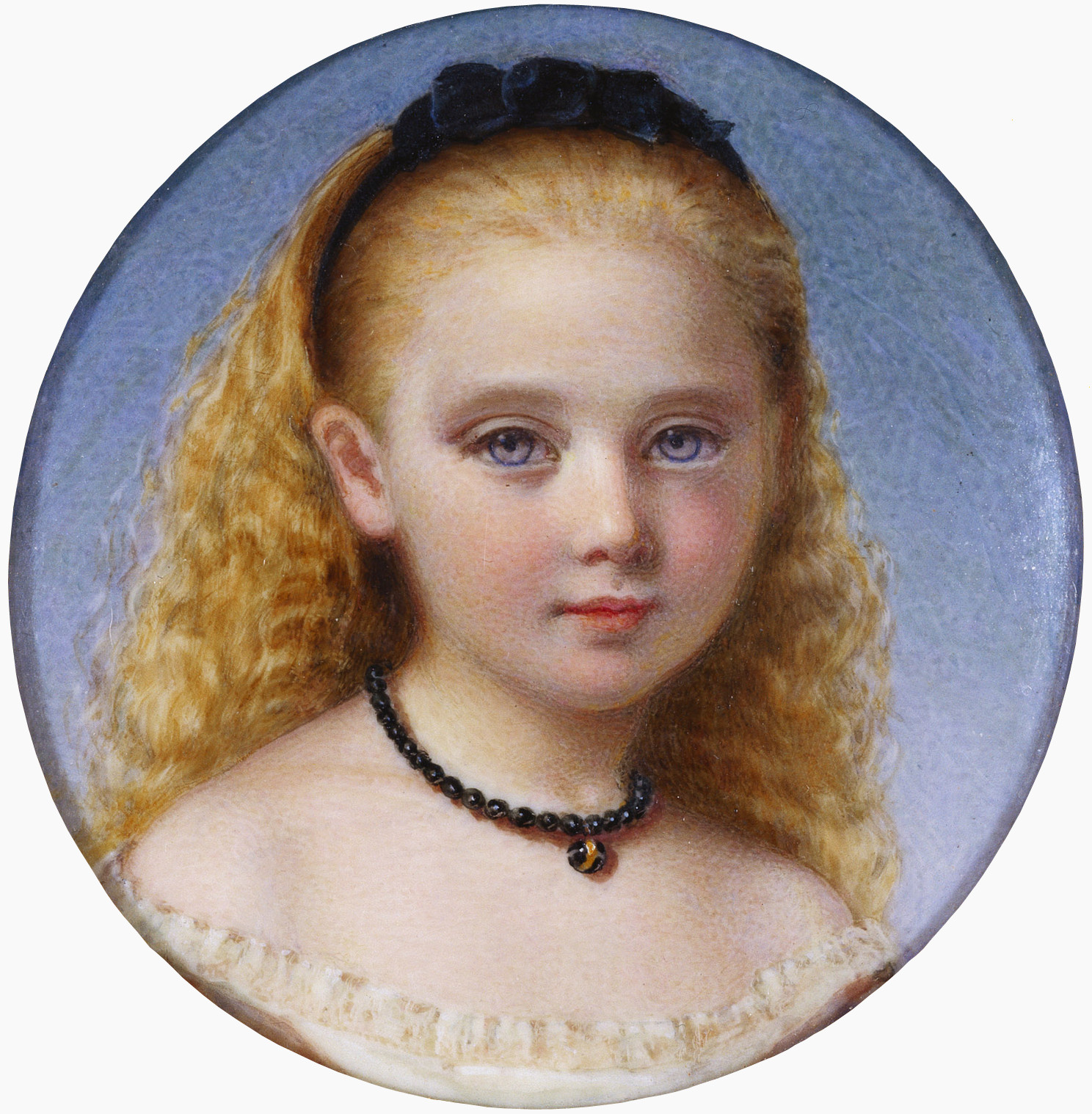
Princess Beatrice of the United Kingdom

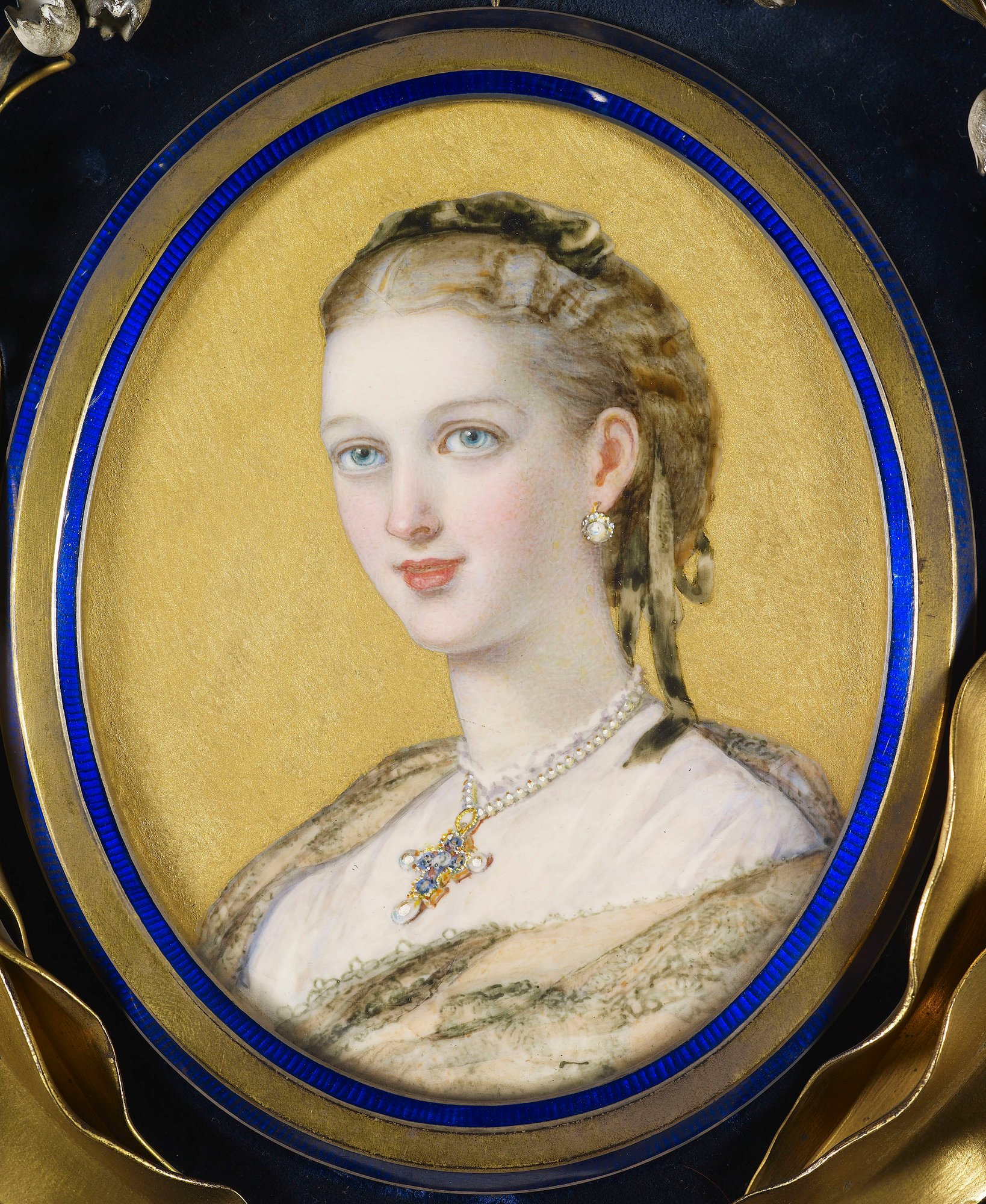
Queen Alexandra, when Princess of Wales

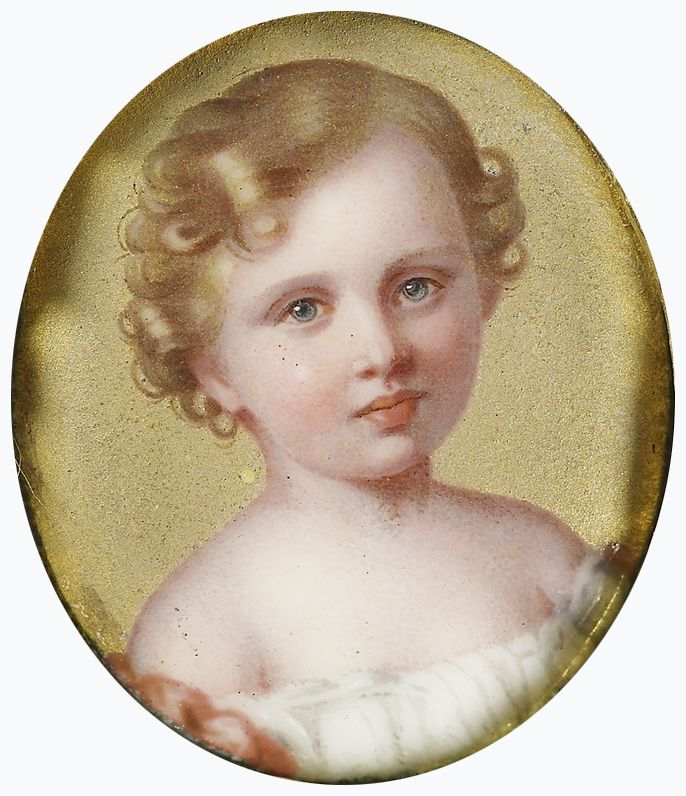
Wilhelm II of Germany

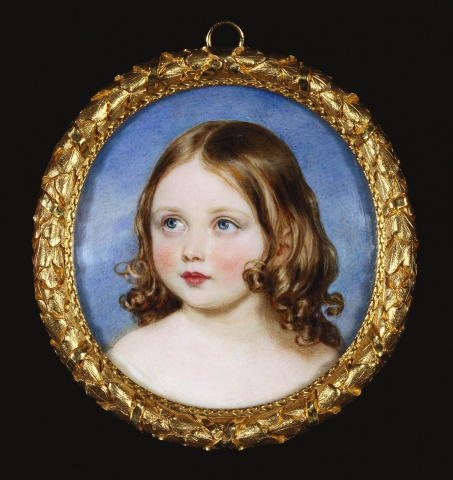
Victoria, Princess Royal

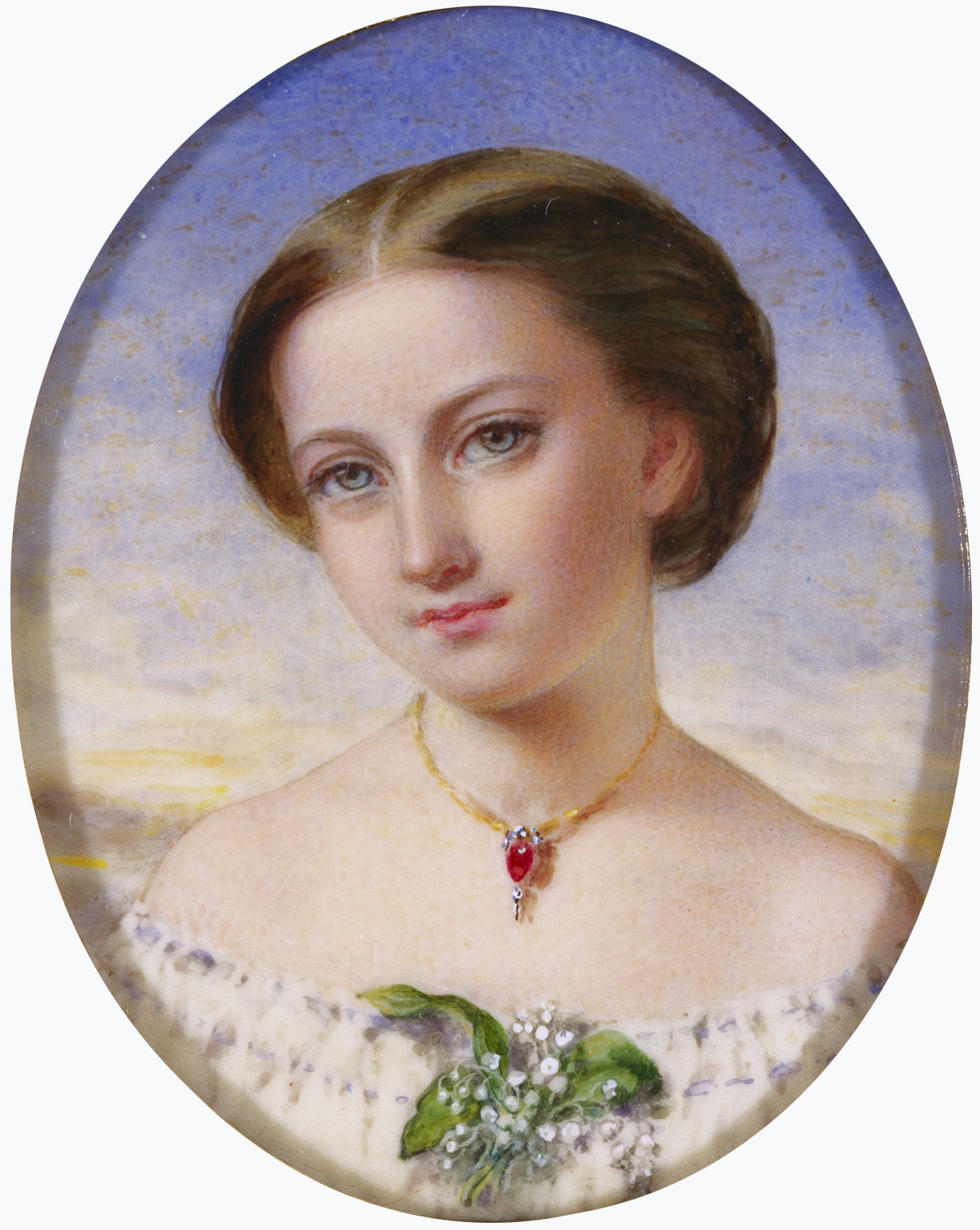
Princess Helena of the United Kingdom

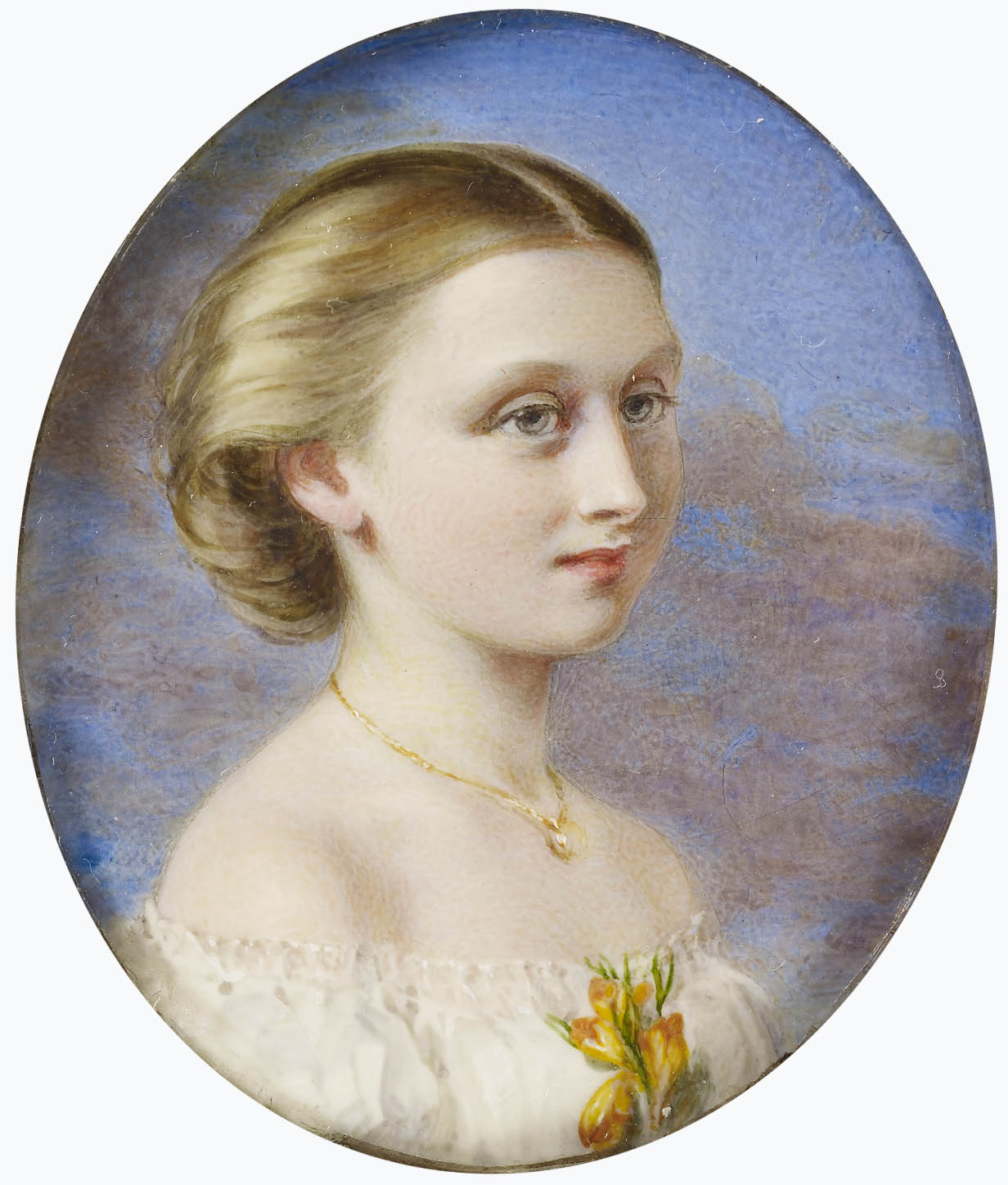
Princess Louise of the United Kingdom
