= Annie Pietri =

French writer (born 1956)

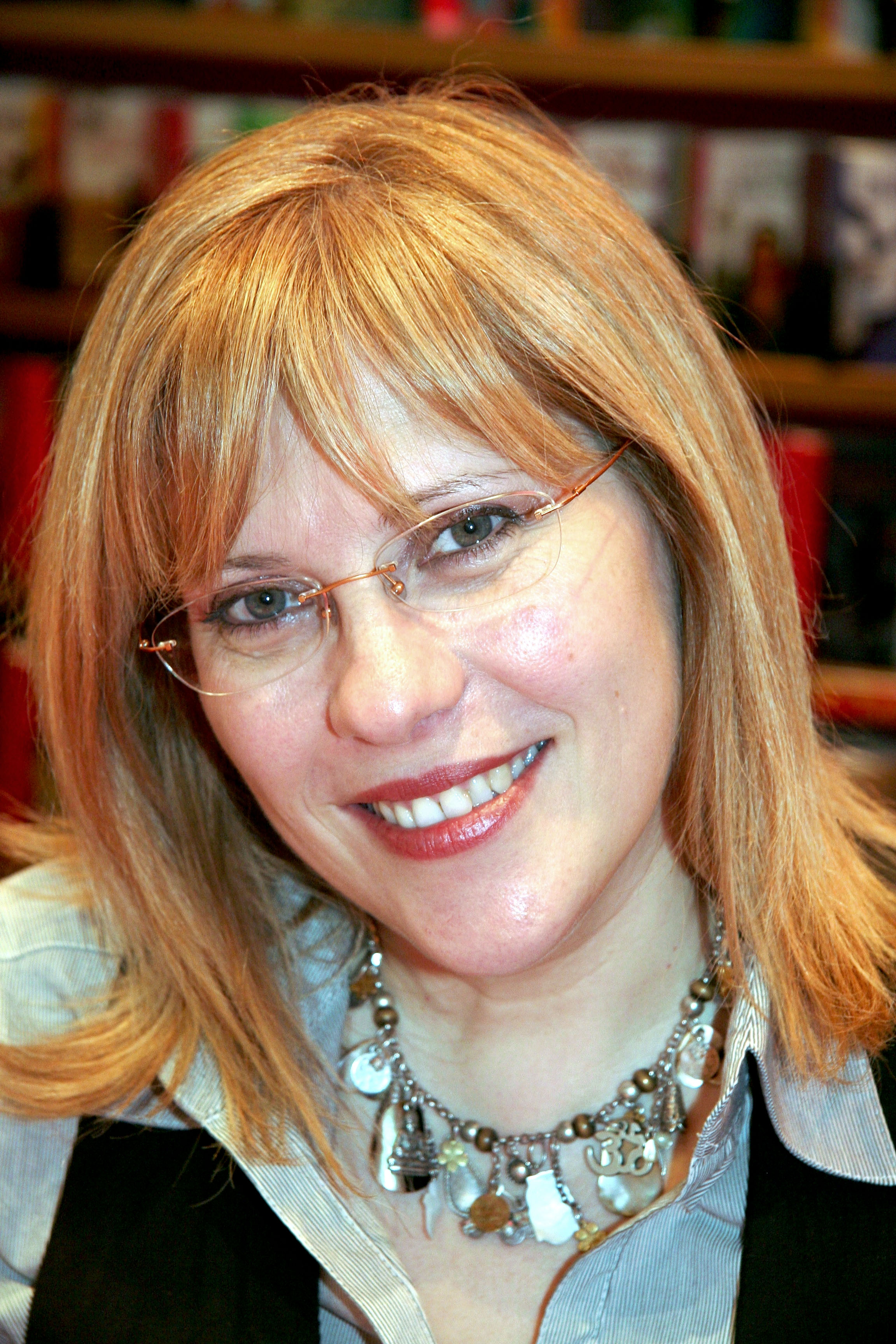
Annie Pietri, 2008

Annie Pietri (born 23 October 1956 in 14th arrondissement) is a French writer. She wrote the novel The orange trees of Versailles (2004).
