= Annie Johnson Flint =

American writer (1866-1932)

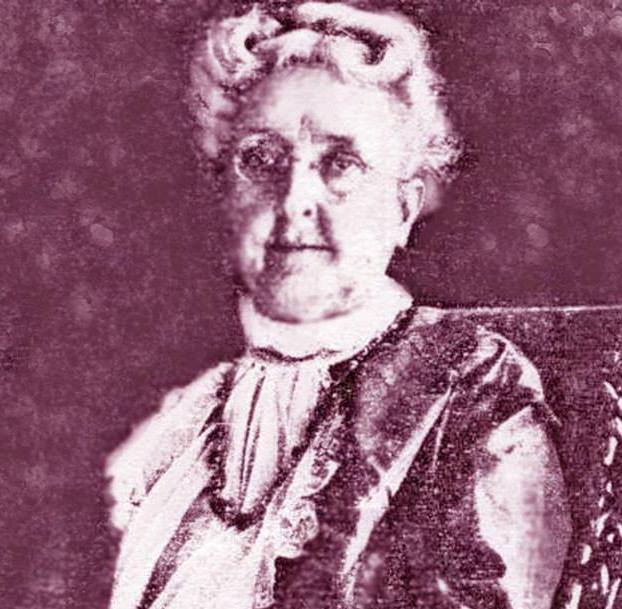
- Born: 25 December 1866; Vineland, New Jersey, United States of America
- Died: 8 September 1932 (aged 65)
- Occupations: Hymnwriter, poet
- Notable work: "He Giveth More Grace" and "Christmas Carols"

Annie Johnson Flint (25 December 1866 – 8 September 1932) was a prolific writer of Christian poems.

== Biography ==
Annie Johnson Flint was born on 25 December 1866 in a small town Vineland, New Jersey. Her father was of English descent, and her mother was Scottish. She lost both parents in her early childhood.

After completing high school, she spent one year at a training school for teachers. She then started teaching a primary class. She began experiencing the symptoms of arthritis during her second year of teaching career. She suffered from a “severe form of arthritis”, which “developed into a chronic condition from which she never recovered.”

She started composing religious poetry, and became “a renowned writer across the Christian world.” Her popular poems include He Giveth More Grace and Christmas Carols, which were published in Christian Endeavour World and Sunday School Times.

Flint died on 8 September 1932. Robert J. Morgan claims that she was called as the 'poet of helpfulness,' in her obituary published in the New York Times.
