= Annie E. Pettway =

American artist (1904–1972)

Annie E. Pettway (1904–1972) was an American artist associated with the Gee's Bend quilting collective. Her work has been exhibited at the Museum of Fine Arts, Houston and is included in the permanent collection of the Philadelphia Museum of Art.

== Early life ==
According to her son, Sheriff Willie Quill Pettway, in an interview with the Souls Grown Deep Foundation, Annie E. Pettway was born on June 18, 1904, to Austin H. Pettway and Leetha Pettway and was one of ten children.

She later married Ed. O Pettway. Sheriff Willie Quill Pettway describes the confusion over his father's name:

"She was married to Ed O.—they said Pettway, but he was a Williams. They changed his name to Pettway because he was living on the Pettway place, and they had to change their name as long as they stay on the place. So, when they took up the census, that’s what he kept his name: Pettway. His father was Ottoway Williams. He had changed his name to Pettway, too."

Together, Ed and Annie had nine children – five boys and four girls. Her son described her as a "housewife and a fieldworker," doing every task imaginable to keep the farm and family running.

== Work ==
Sheriff Pettway describes piecing quilts as a necessity to protect and keep her family warm. It is a tradition that she passed to her daughters and her granddaughters.
