= Annie Mullin =

Welsh suffragist and councillor (died 1921)

Annie Mullin (1847–1921) was a Welsh suffragist, social worker and Liberal councillor, who lived in Pontcanna.

== Career ==
Mullin was employed as a social worker and was a founder member of the Cardiff Women's Local Government Association.

Mullin was a member of the Women's Liberal Association, serving as vice president of the Cathays and Cardiff branch from 1898 to 1901. In 1910, she voted to boycott any candidates who were anti-suffrage at the Cardiff conference of Welsh Liberal women. Mullin was an active suffragist and a member of the Cardiff and District Women's Suffrage Society.

In February 1898, Mullin stood as a Liberal councillor for Roath. Her platform was for "greater humanity" in the care of the poor.

Mullin died in 1921 and was buried in Cathays Cemetery in Cardiff.

In 2022, Mullin was featured in a play about Cardiff's historic characters presented by the A48 Theatre Company.
