= Annie Yellowe Palma =

British poet and child protection advocate (1962–2022)

- Born: 18 April 1962 (age 64); Liverpool, England
- Died: 3 December 2022 (aged 60)
- Education: BSc in Applied Social Science
- Occupation: Writer
- Writing career
- Genre: Poetry
- Notable work: For the Love of a Mother: The Black Children of Ulster

Annie Yellowe Palma (18 April 1962 – 3 December 2022) was a British poet, author and child protection advocate. She wrote about her experiences growing up as a black woman in Northern Ireland at the height of the Troubles.

== Biography ==
Palma was born in Liverpool, England, to an Irish mother and Nigerian father, the only girl among her mother's six children by various men. She grew up in her mother's native Portadown, County Armagh, in a staunchly Protestant family. Her parents separated when she was four; she never saw her father, who died just two years later, again. Palma was regularly bullied at school because of her mixed race, while her alcoholic mother frequently neglected her children.

Palma moved to London in 1986 and became a qualified social worker with a diploma in Social Work and a BSc in Applied Social Science. She later believed that had she not left Northern Ireland, she might have contemplated suicide. Palma worked with several children's centres and helped improve their child protection services. She criticised the government's austerity cuts against public services, believing that they would leave child protection services with too much work.

Palma died on 3 December 2022, at the age of 60.

== Writing ==
Palma published several collections of poetry and an autobiography, For the Love of a Mother: The Black Children of Ulster (2017). The book documents her growing up in the 1960s and 1970s, and how her black family coped with the sectarianism and violence at that time.

== Published works ==
- For the Love of a Mother: The Black Children of Ulster. Cloister House Press. 2017. ISBN 978-1-909-46556-5.
