= Annie Greenaway =

Montserratian soprano

Annie Cummings Greenaway (16 June 1905 – 1995) was a Montserratian-American soprano soloist.

== Early life and education ==
Greenaway was born in 1905 in Saint Peter's Parish, Montserrat, of African descent. When Greenaway she was three, her mother, Mary Cummings, moved to Trinidad, and later to the United States, leaving her under the guardianship of an aunt. Having joined her church's choir when she was 11, Greenaway would join her mother in New York City in 1923, where she would attend high school and later the New York College of Music, which she attended for three years. She became a U.S. citizen in 1929. She married Joseph Greenaway in 1932.

== Career ==
1937, Greenaway attracted a crowd of more than 400 to a recital at Union Congregational Church on West 138th Street in Harlem, where she sang songs in English, Italian, French and German. In 1938, she became the lead singer of the church choir. That same year, she presented her pupils in a recital which featured Daniel Galloway, Olive Arthur, and Gwendolyn Francis, all of whom were described as "great artists" by The New York Age.

On July 17, 1949, Greenaway performed in Montserrat, which drew a crowd of 600, including governor Earl Baldwin and commissioner Charlesworth Ross. She was also a philanthropist, benefiting Montserrat and other developing countries. George Irish, the composer of the national song of Montserrat, wrote a book, entitled Perspectives for Alliouagana : a tribute to Mme. Annie Cummings-Greenaway, Caribbean-American humanitarian and role model; it was published in 1990.

She died in 1995 in Brooklyn, New York.
