= Annie Reickert =

Hawaiian big wave surfer

Annie Starr Reickert (born July 17, 2001) is a Hawaiian big wave surfer.

She is the first woman to foil the Ka’iwi Channel between Molokai and Oahu in Hawaii and came third at the Jaws Big Wave Competition in 2018.

In 2022 she won the Biggest Paddle division of the Big Wave Awards by the World Surf League.

In 2024 she was invited to compete in “The Eddie”.
