= Annie Wells =

Annie Wells or Ann Wells may refer to:

- Annie Wells (photographer) (born 1954), American photographer
- Annie Wells (politician) (born 1972), Scottish politician
- Ann E. Wells (1906–1979), Australian writer, nurse, and linguist (also known as Annie)
