= Annie Zaenen =

American linguist

Annie Else Zaenen (born 1941 in Belgium) is an adjunct professor of linguistics at Stanford University, California, United States.

== Career ==
Zaenen obtained her Ph.D. at Harvard University with her doctoral thesis Extraction Rules in Icelandic in 1980. After a postdoc at MIT, she taught syntax at the University of Pennsylvania, Cornell University, and Harvard, before joining PARC and Stanford. During the ‘90s, she was the manager of the Natural Language group of the Xerox Research Centre Europe in Grenoble, France. After Zaenen retired from PARC in 2011, she joined a research group on Language and Natural Reasoning at CSLI working on the linguistic encoding of temporal and spatial information, local textual inferences and natural logic.

She has worked on both the syntax of Germanic languages and on the development of Lexical Functional Grammar (LFG), with excursions into lexical semantics. Her contributions to the theory of Lexical Functional Grammar are in the development of notions such as long-distance dependencies, functional uncertainty and the difference between subsumption and equality. She had numerous widely-cited publications on these topics. Zaenen is also known for her sharp commentary on research trends in Computational Linguistics.

== Honors ==
In 2013, Zaenen was honored by a Festschrift, edited by Tracy Holloway King and Valeria de Paiva.

She was the founding editor of the online journal Linguistic Issues in Language Technology.

In 2024 Zaenen was awarded an honorary doctorate by the Department of Linguistics of the University of Konstanz.

== Partial bibliography ==
- Tense and aspect ISBN 0-12-613514-2
- Modern Icelandic syntax ISBN 0-12-613524-X
- Papers in lexical-functional grammar
- Subjects and other subjects
- Extraction rules in Icelandic ISBN 0-8240-5443-1
- Architectures, rules, and preferences ISBN 1-57586-560-2
