= Annie Alexander =

Annie Alexander may refer to:

- Annie Alexander (athlete), Trinidad and Tobago athlete
- Annie Lowrie Alexander (1864–1929), American physician and educator
- Annie Montague Alexander (1867–1950), American philanthropist and paleontological collector

== See also ==
- Ann Alexander (disambiguation)
