= Annie Elizabeth Helme =

English mayor of City of Lancaster

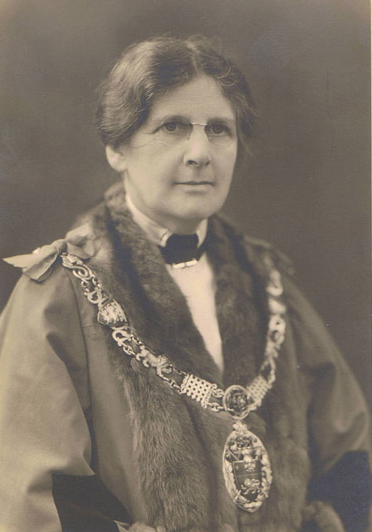
Annie Elizabeth Helme was "Mr Mayor" in 1932

Annie Elizabeth Helme (1874–1963) was the first female mayor of the City of Lancaster in the United Kingdom (per her appointment in 1932). She was a widow and supporter of peace who took her daughter as her lady mayoress. She insisted on being called Mr Mayor.

== Early life ==
She was born Annie Elizabeth Smith in Bradford on 18 February 1874 into a Liberal family, her father was Isaac Smith, who was Mayor of Bradford in 1883 and 1885. She married Walter C Helme, a physician. They had a house in Queens Square; her brother-in-law was Norval Helme (Lancaster MP).

== Suffragist activity ==
In 1911 Helme helped organize Lancaster Suffrage Society and was its joint secretary. They invited Miss Corbett, a London suffragette, to speak at their monthly meeting. With the war, her attention expanded to include war relief work. She was a committee person and served on the Board of Guardians. She was appointed as Secretary of a Central Committee of Ladies. She became a member of the Education Committee.

== Education and council service ==
She was the first woman to be elected onto Lancaster Borough Council in 1919, winning Castle Ward against a discharged military man. She was already well known. She was the first woman to become an alderman, becoming in 1932 Lancaster's first female mayor.

== See also ==
- List of suffragists and suffragettes#United Kingdom
