= Annie Chemis =

New Zealand homemaker, dairy worker, petitioner, and charwoman

Annie Chemis (née Dowd 24 May 1862 – 21 February 1939) was a New Zealand homemaker, dairy worker, petitioner and charwoman. She was born in County Kerry, Ireland on 24 May 1862. Her husband Louis Chemis was imprisoned for the murder of Thomas Hawkings in 1889, and after his eventual release from prison in 1897, committed suicide by blowing himself up with dynamite.
