= Annie Fox =

Annie Fox may refer to:

- Annie Fox (nurse) (1893–1987), first female recipient of the Purple Heart medal
- Annie Fox (author) (born 1950), American author
