= Annie Payep =

Cameroonian journalist

- Born: October 28, 1984; Douala, Littoral Region, Cameroon
- Occupations: Journalist; television producer; entrepreneur
- Years active: 2007–present
- Organization: Impact Media Sarl
- Television: VoxAfrica, Télé Asu
- Title: CEO
- Awards: Special Innovation in Television at Médiations Press Trophies

Annie Payep (born October 28, 1984) is a Cameroonian journalist, television producer, and entrepreneur. She worked as a television presenter at the pan-African channel VoxAfrica from 2009 to 2019 and was appointed deputy managing director in charge of the Douala office in 2015. In 2020, she founded the online television channel Télé Asu.

== Biography ==
=== Early life and education ===
Annie Payep-Nlepe was born on October 28, 1984, in Douala. She studied at the Institut Siantou in Yaoundé, where she obtained a Higher Technician's Certificate (BTS) in journalism in 2005. She also holds a diploma in information and communication sciences and technologies (DSSTIC) with a specialization in journalism from the Ecole Supérieure des Sciences et Techniques de l'Information et de la Communication in Yaoundé. In 2022, she enrolled in a master's program in semiotics and political strategy at the University of Yaoundé I – CERESA.

=== Career ===
Annie Payep-Nlepe began her career in 2007 at VPPRoduction, an audiovisual production company, where she was responsible for managing production teams during shoots and for the conception and realization of documentaries. From October 2007 to October 2009, she served as the head of content production at Gts Africa, a content provider for WAP portals of telecommunications operators. In 2009, she joined Vox Africa Afrique Centrale as a reporter-producer. She held various positions at Vox Africa, including production coordinator, head of information service, digital coordinator, and deputy managing director in charge of the Douala office. She appeared on Sans Racune, Actunet, Elle se racontent, and 52Mag.

In 2019, Annie Payep left Vox Africa and underwent fact-checking training with the Goethe Institute in partnership with Africa Check. She then created Stopintox, a fact-checking website aimed at combating fake news, particularly in the political and technological domains. In 2020, she launched Télé Asu, an online news TV channel serving the public through programs such as Téléasu News and Echos tech. Annie Paye-Nlepe is the founder and CEO of Impact Media Sarl, a media strategy consulting firm, audiovisual production, and digital communication. The firm operates Télé Asu and Stopintox.

== Social engagement ==
Annie Payep-Nlepe is interested in social issues such as the Anglophone crisis in Cameroon, misgovernance, women's empowerment, human rights, equal opportunities, and others. She often shares her views through her Twitter account, which has 87,372 followers. Between 2019 and 2023, she served as secretary in charge of training at Snjc Littoral.

== Personal life ==
Annie Payep is married and has three children.

== Awards and recognitions ==
2015: Special Innovation in Television at Médiations Press Trophies.

2016: Digital Women Excellence Award by CEFEPROD and UN Women. This award celebrates girls and women invested in the fields of technology (ICT in particular) who, through their actions and achievements, break the stereotypes that still haunt our Cameroonian society.

2020: Top 200 Most Influential African Women on Twitter by Smart Data Power.

2021: Top 40 Inspiring Women in Communication and Media Professions in Francophone Africa and the Diaspora by Naola Media.
