= Annie Zaidi =

Annie Zaidi may refer to:

- Annie Zaidi (writer) (born 1978), English-language writer from India
- Annie Zaidi (actress) (born 1963), Pakistani actress
