= Annette (given name) =

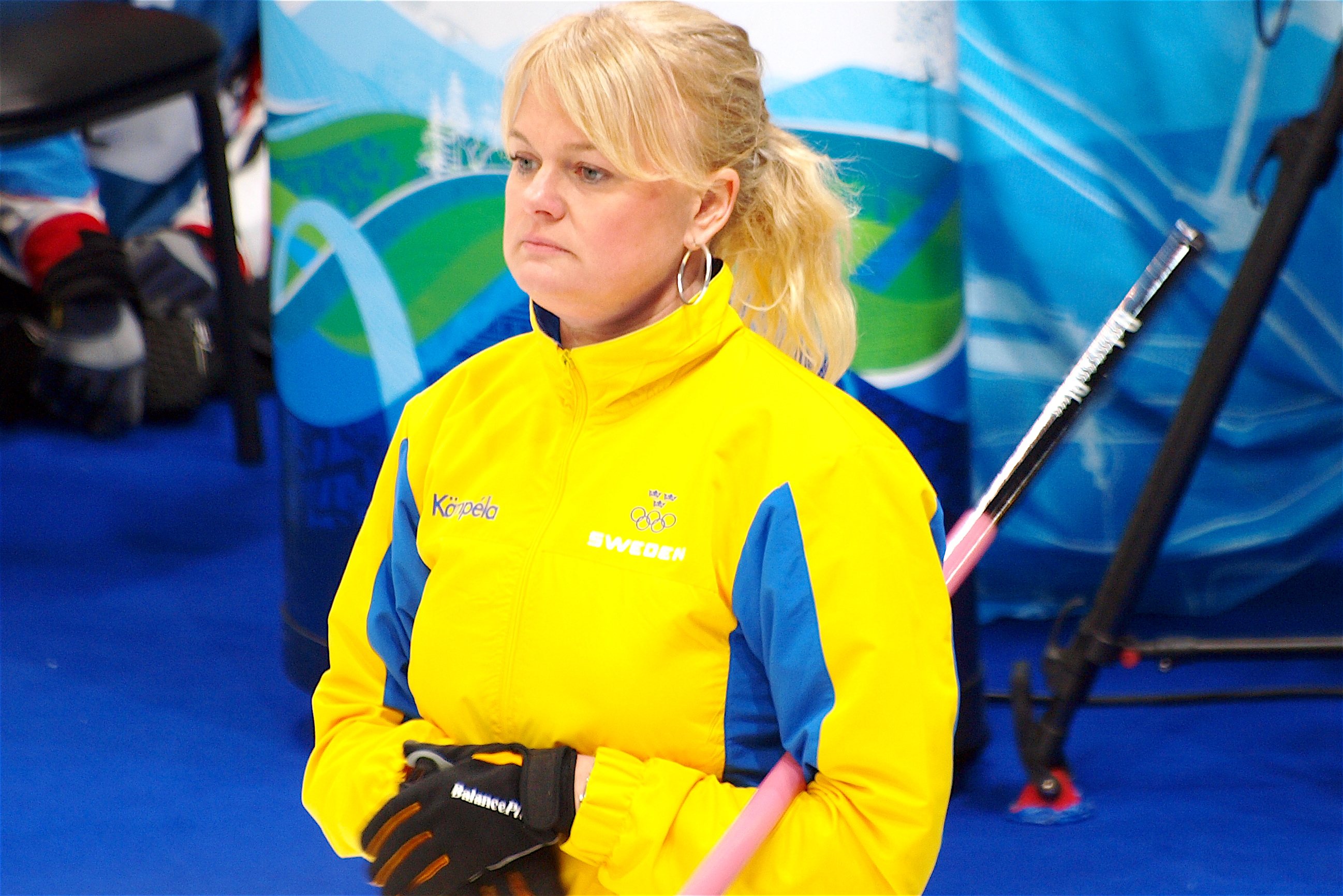
Anette Norberg

Annette or Anette is a given name that is a diminutive of Anna or Anne, and has been used as a name of its own since the Industrial Age. In Greek, the variant Anneta is used.

Notable people with the name include:

== People named Annette ==
- Annette Abbott Adams (1877–1956), American lawyer and judge
- Annette A. Aguilar (born 1957), American drummer
- Annette Aiello (born 1941), American entomologist and botanist
- Annette Allcock (1923–2001), British artist
- Annette Andre (born 1939), Australian actress
- Annette Arkeketa, American dramatist
- Annette Ashberry (also known as Anne Ashberry) (1894–1990), British engineer, gardener and author
- Annette Auguste (died 2020), Haitian folk singer and activist
- Annette Bach, German actress
- Annette Bade (1900–1975), American showgirl and actress
- Annette Badland (born 1950), British actress
- Annette Baier (1929–2012), New Zealand philosopher
- Annette Baker Fox (c. 1912–2011), American international relations scholar
- Annette Barbier (1950–2017), American artist and educator
- Annette Kar Baxter (1926–1983), American women's history expert, professor and author
- Annette Bear-Crawford (1853–1899), Australian suffragist
- Annette Beard (born 1943), American singer
- Annette Beautrais, New Zealand suicidologist
- Annette Beck-Sickinger (born 1960), German biochemist
- Annette Becker (born 1953), French historian
- Annette Bening (born 1958), American actress
- Annette Benson, British actress
- Annette Bergbo (born 1953), Ålandic politician and journalist
- Annette Beutler (born 1976), Swiss cyclist
- Annette Beveridge (1842–1929), British orientalist
- Annette Bezor (1950–2020), Australian painter
- Annette Bjelkevik (born 1978), Norwegian speed skater
- Annette Bjergfeldt, Danish singer, songwriter, and author
- Annette Brander (born 1993), Australia international rugby league footballer
- Annette Braun (1884–1978), American entomologist
- Annette Brissett, Jamaican reggae singer
- Annette Broadrick (born 1938), American novelist
- Annette Brooke (1947–2025), British politician
- Annette E. Brown (born 1950), retired Rear Admiral of the United States Navy
- Annette Smith Burgess (1899–1962), American medical illustrator
- Annette Byrne, Irish physiologist and researcher
- Annette Calud (born 1963), American actress
- Annette Campbell (born 1961), British weightlifter
- Annette Carell (1926–1967), American actress
- Annette Carlén-Karlsson (born 1956), Swedish speed skater
- Annette DiMeo Carlozzi, American art curator
- Annette Carson (born 1940), British non-fiction writer and biographer
- Annette Carter (1941–2025), American politician
- Annette Cascone, American author and screenwriter
- Annette Chalut (1924–2021), French physician
- Annette Chaparro (born 1967), American politician
- Annette Charles (1948–2011), American actress, dancer, and educator
- Annette Clark, American academic administrator
- Annette Clarke, Irish sportswoman
- Annette Clarke (producer), Canadian film producer
- Annette Cleveland, American politician from Washington state
- Annette Clifford (1881–1968), New Zealand landlord
- Annette Coe (born 1954), British tennis player
- Annette Cone-Skelton, American artist
- Annette Conlon, American singer-songwriter
- Annette Cooper (born 1953), British Church of England priest
- Annette Corcoran, American artist
- Annette Cottle, American volleyball player and coach
- Annette Court (born 1962), British businesswoman
- Annette Cowley-Nel (born 1967), South African swimmer
- Annette Crosbie (born 1934), Scottish actor
- Annette Daniels (1961–2004), American opera singer
- Annette Dasch (born 1976), German soprano
- Annette Dashofy, American author
- Annette DeFoe (1890–1960), American actress
- Annette Del Zoppo (1936–2001), American photographer
- Annette Dittert, German author and filmmaker
- Annette Dobmeier (born 1968), German fencer
- Annette Dobson (born 1945), Australian biostatistician, researcher, and professor
- Annette Dolphin, British Professor of Pharmacology
- Annette von Droste-Hülshoff (1797–1848), German writer
- Annette Drummond (born 1984), Scottish cricketer
- Annette Dubas (born 1956), American politician from Nebraska
- Annette Ducharme, Canadian musician and songwriter
- Annette Duetz (born 1993), Dutch competitive sailor
- Annette Dytrt (born 1983), German figure skater
- Annette Echikunwoke (born 1996), Nigerian-American hammer thrower
- Annette Eddie-Callagain (born 1953), American lawyer
- Annette Edmondson (born 1991), Australian cyclist
- Annette Eick (1909–2010), Jewish lesbian writer
- Annette Ekblom, English actress
- Annette Ellis (born 1946), Australian politician
- Annette Evans (born 1944), Scottish lawn bowls player
- Annette Faße (born 1947), German politician
- Annette Fellows (born 1955), Australian cricketer
- Annette Ferguson, Scottish observational astrophysicist
- Annette Finch (born 1980), Australian rugby union player
- Annette Finnigan (c. 1873–1940), American suffragist and philanthropist
- Annette Hoyt Flanders, American landscape architect
- Annette Focks (born 1964), German musician and film score composer
- Annette Frederiksen (1954–2022), Danish association football player
- Annette Freyberg-Inan, German political scientist
- Annette Frier (born 1974), German actress and comedian
- Annette Fuentes, American journalist
- Annette Fugmann-Heesing (born 1955), German politician
- Annette Funicello (1942–2013), American actress and singer
- Annette Georges, Seychellois politician and lawyer
- Annette Gerritsen (born 1985), Dutch speed skater
- Annette Gigon (born 1959), Swiss architect
- Annette Glenn (born 1963), American politician
- Annette Gordon-Reed (born 1958), American historian
- Annette Gough, Australian academic
- Annette Groth (born 1954), German politician
- Annette Groth (born 1952), Norwegian journalist
- Annette Grüters-Kieslich (born 1954), German pediatrician
- Annette Gulley (born 1964), Australian tennis player
- Annette Haas (1912–2002), French pianist
- Annette Hadding (born 1975), German swimmer
- Annette Hagre, Swedish ten-pin bowler
- Annette Hakonsen (born 1962), Danish darts player
- Annette Hamilton, Australian cultural anthropologist
- Annette Hamm, Canadian news anchor and reporter
- Annette Hanshaw (1901–1985), American jazz singer
- Annette Harnack (born 1958), German high jumper
- Annette Haven (born 1954), American pornographic film actress and erotic dancer
- Annette Heffernan (born 1962), New Zealand netball international
- Annette Henderson, psychology professor in New Zealand
- Annette Henninger, German political scientist
- Annette Herfkens (born 1961), Dutch-Venezuelan sole survivor
- Annette Herscovics (c. 1938–2008), scientist at McGill University
- Annette Hohn (born 1966), German rower
- Annette Holmberg-Jansson (born 1969), Finnish politician
- Annette Huber-Klawitter (born 1967), German mathematician
- Annette Hug (born 1970), Swiss author
- Annette Humpe (born 1950), German songwriter, pop singer, and record producer
- Annette Huntington, New Zealand nursing academic
- Annette Hurley (born 1955), Australian politician
- Annette Huygens Tholen (born 1966), Australian beach volleyball player
- Annette Imhausen (born 1970), German historian of ancient Egyptian mathematics
- Annette Insdorf, American film historian
- Annette Jahns (1958–2020), German contralto
- Annette P. Jimerson, American painter
- Annette Johnson (1928–2017), New Zealand alpine skier
- Annette Jones, New Zealand architect and urban designer
- Annette Jørgensen (born 1966), Danish swimmer
- Annette Jörnlind (born 1967), Swedish female curler
- Annette Malm Justad (born 1958), Norwegian businessperson
- Annette Kansy (born 1955), German figure skater
- Annette Karmiloff-Smith (1938–2016), developmental psychologist
- Annette Kaufman (1914–2016), American pianist and author
- Annette Kellerman (1886–1975), Australian swimmer, vaudeville star, film actress, and writer
- Annette Kennedy, Past President of the International Council of Nurses
- Annette Kerr (1920–2013), Scottish actress
- Annette Kim, American academic and urban planner
- Annette King (born 1947), New Zealand politician
- Annette Curtis Klause (born 1953), American novelist
- Annette Klug (born 1969), German fencer
- Annette Kolb (1870–1967), the working name of German author and pacifist Anna Mathilde Kolb
- Annette Kolb (born 1983), German tennis player
- Annette Kolodny (1941–2019), American academic
- Annette Kouamba Matondo, Congolese film director and journalist
- Annette Krier (born 1937), Luxembourgish gymnast
- Annette Kroon, Dutch cricketer
- Annette Kruisbrink (born 1958), Dutch classical guitarist and composer
- Annette Kuhn (born 1945), British academic
- Annette Kullenberg (1939–2021), Swedish writer and journalist
- Annette Kundu (born 1996), Kenyan footballer
- Annette Kurschus (born 1963), German Protestant theologian and pastor
- Annette Laming-Emperaire (1917–1977), French archaeologist
- Annette Lapointe (born 1978), Canadian writer
- Annette Lareau (born 1952), American sociologist
- Annette Wirén Larsen (born 1991), Danish handball player
- Annette Laursen (born 1975), Danish footballer
- Annette S. Lee, American astrophysicist, educator, and artist
- Annette Lee (born 1992), Singaporean singer-songwriter
- Annette Lemieux (born 1957), American artist
- Annette Leo (born 1948), German historian and biographer
- Annette LeSiege (1947–2012), American composer
- Annette Lewis Phinazee (1920–1983), American librarian
- Annette Lind (born 1969), Danish politician
- Annette Lovemore (born 1958), South African politician
- Annette Lu (born 1944), Taiwanese politician
- Annette Lyon (born 1973), American novelist
- Annette Macarthur-Onslow (1933–2026), Australian author/illustrator
- Annette Elizabeth Mahon (1918–2013), Irish pilot
- Annette Main (born 1951/1952), New Zealand politician
- Annette Mangaard, Danish/Canadian filmmaker
- Annette Markert, German classical mezzo-soprano and alto
- Annette Markham, American academic
- Annette Mbaye d'Erneville (born 1926), Senegalese writer
- Annette McCarthy (1958–2023), American actress
- Annette E. McCrea (1858–1928), pioneer American landscape architect
- Annette McGavigan, Northern Irish student, killed during the Troubles
- Annette Meakin (1867–1959), British travel author
- Annette Meeks (born 1960), American politician
- Annette Meeuvissen (1962–2004), German touring car driver
- Annette Melton (born 1988), Australian actress and television presenter
- Annette Merz (born 1965), German theologian
- Annette Messager (born 1943), French artist
- Annette Jacky Messomo (born 1993), Cameroonian footballer
- Annette Meyers (born 1934), American mystery writer
- Annette Michelson (1922–2018), American art film critic
- Annette Mills (1894–1955), English actress, dancer, and broadcaster
- Annette Mills, Jamaican-New Zealand professor
- Annette Mogensen (born 1959), Danish footballer
- Annette Moreno (born 1972), American singer and songwriter
- Annette Muller (1933–2021), French writer and holocaust survivor
- Annette Nazareth (born 1956), American lawyer
- Annette Nellen, American lawyer and professor
- Annette Ngo Ndom (born 1985), Cameroonian footballer
- Annette Nijs (born 1961), Dutch politician
- Annette Lucile Noble (1844–1932), American novelist and travel writer
- Annette O'Connor, Canadian professor of nursing
- Annette O'Toole (born 1952), American actress
- Annette Obrestad (born 1988, Norwegian poker player
- Annette K. Olesen (born 1965), Danish screenwriter and director
- Princess Annette of Orange-Nassau (born 1972), member of the Dutch nobility
- Annette Jocelyn Otway-Ruthven (1909–1989), Irish historian
- Annette Oxenius (born 1968), Swiss immunologist and academic
- Annette Page (1932–2017), English ballerina
- Annette av Paul (born 1944), Swedish Canadian ballet dancer
- Annette Paul, New Zealand Salvation Army officer
- Annette Peacock, American jazz composer
- Annette Pearse, New Zealand art gallery curator and director
- Annette Pehnt, German writer and literary critic
- Annette Penhaligon (born 1946), British politician
- Annette Peters (born 1965), American long-distance runner
- Annette Peulvast-Bergeal (born 1946), French politician
- Annette Poivre (1917–1988), French actress
- Annette Potempa (born 1976), German gymnast
- Annette Poulsen (born 1969), Danish swimmer
- Annette Presley, New Zealand businesswoman
- Annette Quijano (born 1962), American politician
- Annette Raijer (born 1968), Dutch politician
- Annette Reber (1964–2008), German stage director and dramaturge
- Annette Yoshiko Reed, religious studies academic
- Annette de la Renta (born 1939), French-American philanthropist
- Annette Richardson Dinwoodey (1906–2007), American singer
- Annette Robertson, English actress
- Annette Robinson (born 1940), American politician
- Annette Rogers (1913–2006), American sprinter and high jumper
- Annette Roozen (born 1976), Dutch Paralympic athlete
- Annette Roque (born 1966), Dutch model and equestrian
- Annette Rubinstein (1910–2007), American Marxist educator, literary critic and activist
- Annette Rydell (born 1965), Swedish politician
- Annette Saint-Pierre (1925–2026), Canadian educator, writer and publisher
- Annette Salaman (1827–1879), English writer
- Annette Salmeen (born 1974), American swimmer
- Annette Sanders, American jazz musician
- Annette Sattel (born 1971), French sports shooter
- Annette Sawade (born 1953), German politician
- Annette Schavan (born 1955), German politician
- Annette Schlünz (born 1964), German classical composer and musician
- Annette Schmiedchen, German author
- Annette Schortinghuis-Poelenije (born 1952), Dutch rower
- Annette Schultz (born 1957), East German volleyball player
- Annette Seegers (born 1952), South African academic
- Annette Seiltgen (born 1964), German opera singer
- Annette Sergent (born 1962), French long-distance runner
- Annette Shelby (1939–2025), American academic
- Annette Sikveland (born 1972), Norwegian biathlete
- Annette Sinclair, American actress and author
- Annette Skotvoll (born 1968), Norwegian handball player
- Annette Smith-Knight, American women's basketball player and coach
- Annette Snell (1945–1977), American singer
- Annette Solange Georges (born 1957), Seychellois politician and lawyer
- Annette Solmell (born 1959), Swedish equestrian
- Annette Stensson-Fjordefalk (born 1958), Swedish actress
- Annette Steyn (born 1969), South African politician
- Annette Strauss (1924–1998), American politician
- Annette Stroyberg (1936–2005), Danish actress
- Annette Summers Engel, American earth scientist
- Annette Sweeney (born 1957), American politician
- Annette Sykes (born 1961), New Zealand activist and lawyer
- Annette Taddeo (born 1967), American politician
- Annette Tånnander (born 1958), Swedish Olympic athlete
- Annette Thoma (1886–1974), German female composer
- Annette Thomas, American-born publishing executive
- Annette Thommessen (1932–1994), French-Norwegian human rights activist
- Annette Thychosen (born 1968), Danish footballer
- Annette Tison (1942–2010), French architect and writer
- Annette Tucker, American songwriter
- Annette Turnbaugh, American politician
- Annette Tveter (born 1974), Norwegian handball player
- Annette Unger (born 1962), German classical violinist
- Annette van Dyck-Hemming (born 1965), German musicologist
- Annette Van Dyke (born 1943), American women's studies academic
- Annette Van Zyl (born 1943), South African tennis player
- Annette Vilhelmsen (born 1959), Danish politician
- Annette Vissing-Jørgensen, Danish financial economist
- Annette Volfing (born 1965), German academic
- Annette Volkamer, German classical pianist
- Annette Wademant (1928–2017), Belgian screenwriter
- Annette Persis Ward (1873–1953), American librarian, writer
- Annette Warren (born 1922), American vocalist and jazz stylist
- Annette Watts (born 1959), American basketball player and coach
- Annette Weber (born 1967), German political scientist
- Annette Weiner (1933–1997), American anthropologist
- Annette Weintraub (born 1946), American new media artist and writer
- Annette Werner (born 1966), German mathematician
- Annette Westbay, American actress and playwright
- Annette Widmann-Mauz (born 1966), German politician
- Annette Wieviorka (born 1948), French historian
- Annette Polly Williams (1937–2014), American counselor, clerical worker, and politician
- Annette Winkler (born 1959), German businessman
- Annette Woodward (born 1947), Australian sport shooter
- Annette Wyrwoll (born 1955), German equestrian
- Annette Ziegler (born 1964), American attorney and judge
- Annette Zilinskas (born 1962), American musician
- Annette Zippelius (born 1949), German physicist
- Annette, Special Operations Executive codename for Yvonne Cormeau, a British spy during World War II

== People named Anette ==
- Anette Askvik (born 1983), Norwegian songwriter, composer, pianist, and vocalist
- Anette Bøe (born 1957), former Norwegian cross-country skier
- Anette Borchorst (born 1951), Danish academic
- Anette Börjesson (born 1954), Swedish badminton player
- Anette Dawn (born 1978), Hungarian call girl and make-up artist
- Anette Egelund (born 1956), Danish politician
- Anette Fanqvist (born 1969), Swedish cross-country skier
- Anette Fischer (1946–1992), Danish librarian and human rights activist
- Anette Fredriksson (1960–2008), Swedish breaststroke swimmer
- Anette Gersch (born 1966), German former alpine skier
- Anette Gleichmann (born 1964), Norwegian investor and publisher
- Anette Granstedt (born 1968), Swedish orienteering competitor
- Anette Grecchi Gray, Swiss chef
- Anette Haellmigk, German cinematographer
- Anette Hansson (born 1963), Swedish former footballer
- Anette Helene Hansen (born 1992), former Norwegian handball player
- Anette Hoff (born 16 May 1961), Norwegian actress
- Anette Hoffmann (born 1971), former Danish team handball player
- Anette Hosoi, American mechanical engineer, biophysicist, and mathematician
- Anette Hovind Johansen (born 1980) is a Norwegian handball player
- Anette Hübinger (born 1955), German politician
- Anette Igland (born 1971), Norwegian former footballer
- Anette Kolmos (born 1956), Danish academic
- Anette Kontaveit (born 1995), Estonian former professional tennis player
- Anette Kramme (born 1967), German lawyer and politician
- Anette Michel (born 1971), Mexican actress
- Anette Norberg (born 1966), Swedish curler and Olympic gold medalist
- Anette S. Olsen (born 1956), Norwegian businesswoman
- Anette Olzon (born 1971), Swedish politician
- Anette Philipsson (born 1965), former Swedish swimmer
- Anette Poelman (1853–1914), Dutch suffragist and philanthropist.
- Anette Prehn (born 1975), Danish author and sociologist
- Anette Rangdag (born 1962), Swedish politician
- Anette Ree Andersen (born 1967), Danish sailor
- Anette Reuterskiöld (1804–1880), Finnish writer
- Anette Rückes (born 1951), German athlete
- Anette Sagen (born 1985), Norwegian former ski jumper
- Anette Sanford (born 1983), Dominican nurse and politician
- Anette Stai (born 1961), Norwegian model
- Anette Støvelbæk (born 1967), Danish actress
- Anette Tønsberg (born 1970), Norwegian speed skater
- Anette Trettebergstuen (born 25 May 1981), Norwegian politician
- Anette Vaher (born 2007), Estonian rhythmic gymnast
- Anette Vázquez (born 2002), Mexican footballer
- Anette Viborg Andreasen (born 1990), Danish sailor
- Anette Wiig Bryn (born 1964), Norwegian politician
- Anette Wilhelm (born 1972), Swedish wheelchair curler

== Fictional characters ==
- Annette Fantine Dominic, a character from the video game Fire Emblem: Three Houses
