= Anniken =

Anniken is a feminine given name.

== People with the given name ==
- Anniken Hauglie (born 1972), Norwegian politician
- Anniken Huitfeldt (born 1969), Norwegian politician and historian
- Anniken Mork (born 1991), Norwegian ski jumper
- Anniken Obaidli (born 1995), Norwegian handball player
- Anniken Paulsen (born 1955), Norwegian contemporary composer and pianist
- Anniken Refseth (born 1975), Norwegian politician
- Anniken Wollik (born 1997), Norwegian handball player

== See also ==
- Anakin Skywalker, fictional character from the Star Wars universe
- Anna
- Annette
- Anita
- Andrea
- Angela
- Anastasia
