= Annette Seegers =

South African academic

- Born: 14 August 1952 (age 74); East London, South Africa
- Occupation: Emeritus Professor at the University of Cape Town

Academic background
- Education: University of Pretoria (BA, MA); Loyola University Chicago (PhD)
- Thesis: Revolution in Africa: The Case of Zimbabwe (1965–1980) (1983)
- Doctoral advisor: Sam Sarkesian

Academic work
- Discipline: Political science
- Sub-discipline: Security studies Conflict studies
- Main interests: Civil–military relations, war, armed forces in democratic transitions
- Notable works: The Military and the Making of Modern South Africa (1996)

Annette Seegers (born 14 August 1952) is a South African academic who is emeritus professor in political studies at the University of Cape Town, where she has taught since 1986. She is best known for her research on civil–military relations in South Africa and elsewhere in Africa.

== Academic background ==
Born in East London, Seegers completed her undergraduate and master's degrees at the University of Pretoria. During her latter years there, she was attached as a researcher to the Institute for Strategic Studies. She attended the Loyola University Chicago on a Fulbright Scholarship and completed her PhD, under the supervision of Sam Sarkesian, in 1984.

== Academic positions ==
Seegers joined the political studies department at the University of Cape Town in 1986 and became a full professor in 1998. She was a longstanding head of the department. She was also a visiting professor at Princeton University between 1999 and 2016, and since 2018 has been a visiting professor at the Vienna School of International Studies.

Seegers held a variety of research and policy roles during South Africa's post-apartheid transition: she was a member of the technical committee on political violence at the Multi-Party Negotiating Forum; a political analyst at the Independent Electoral Commission in the run-up to the 1994 general election; an advisor to the head of research at the Truth and Reconciliation Commission; and a technical advisor to the Constitutional Assembly that drafted the 1996 South African Constitution, in which capacity she was attached to the committee that drafted chapter 11 on the security forces and prisons. She remained involved in defence and security policymaking in subsequent years. She has also served on the editorial board of Social Dynamics and African Security Review.

== Scholarship ==
Seegers's primary research interests are civil-military relations; inter- and intrastate wars; security studies; and the role of armed forces during transitions to democracy. Her usual focus is on cases from Africa.

She is best known for her research about the role of the South African military during apartheid and during the post-apartheid transition. Her 1996 book, The Military and the Making of Modern South Africa, was among the first on that topic and was described as "pathbreaking". It was warmly received by her contemporaries, and it became a seminal work in the field.
