= Nellen =

Nellen is a surname. Notable people with the surname include:

- Joop van Nellen (1910–1992), Dutch football forward
- Margret Kiener Nellen (born 1953), Swiss attorney, translator and former Swiss politician
- Annette Nellen, American lawyer, academic and author
- Peter Nellen (1912–1969), German politician
