= Annette Mangaard =

Filmmaker

- Born: 1956 (age 69–70); Vaerlose, Denmark

Annette Mangaard is a Danish/Canadian filmmaker, artist, writer, director, and producer, whose films and installations have been shown internationally at art galleries, cinematheques and film festivals. With a practice rooted in theatrical drama and explorative documentary, Mangaard's films investigate notions and nuances of freedom within the confines of structural expectations. Mangaard's early films are filled with experimental visual effects, footage is often shot in Super 8 and reshot in 16mm and then printed optically frame by frame. The result is a grainy textured look, with images that are saturated in colour.

Mangaard is recognised as an early contributor to Canada's film development, and is one of the co-founders of the IMAGES: Festival Independent Film/Video. Mangaard has written and directed more than 20 films and installation projects, many of which received awards. Toronto's 2019 Contact Festival features new work in an exhibition from Mangaard, Water Fall: A Cinematic Installation, on at Charles Street Video, May 9–June 15, 2019.

== Early life and education ==
Born in Lille Vaerlose, Denmark, Mangaard immigrated to Canada with her family in 1960, and was raised in (and around) Scarborough. Mangaard completed an Honours in General Studies program at Ontario College of Art and Design, 1977–1981. In 2017 Mangaard completed a master's degree at OCAD University, where she was awarded a medal for outstanding work.

== Career ==
Annette Mangaard's recognisable style was initiated in her first super 8 film, Nothing By Mouth (1984), which was an interpretive response to three poems by Karen Maccormack. In 1981 Mangaard took a super 8 camera to Baker Lake, Nunavut, a small community in the Kivalliq region of Canada. After a year of hunting, fishing and eating caribou with the Inuit of Baker Lake, she returned with five rolls of film, which eventually became one of her trademark innovative narratives, Let Me Wrap My Arms Around You (1992), which screened at the 1992 Vancouver International Film Festival.

Mangaard's first screening involved early film, She Bit Me Seriously (1984), which was featured as a part of the 1985 Cache Du Cinema program at The Funnel, curated by Dot Tuer, John Porter, and Paul McGowan. This film, which was cut together with a hand cranked viewer and tape splicer, was also screened at Millenium, New York (1985), and the Experimental Film Coalition in Chicago (1985), and the soundtrack was played separately on a cassette.

Barbara Sternberg describes Her Soil Is Gold (1985) in article, How We Sit and Just Watch It All, included a soundtrack from The Palace at 4am, and was featured in the 1986 Songs of Experience program at the National Gallery of Canada, at the 1986 Canadian International Film Festival, and also Toronto's Festival of Festivals (1986). Mangaard's early body of work also included There is in Power...Seduction (1985), and The Tyranny of Architecture (1987), which screened at YYZ as an installation in 1987, and also at the New Waves In Cinema Toronto program (1987). Following these Mangaard completed The Iconography of Venus (1987), and wacky road flick Northbound Cairo (1987). A Dialogue With Vision: The Art of Spring Hurlbut and Judith Schwarz (1990), was Mangaard's first documentary, and received funding from LIFT. These early films were exhibited widely in festivals and screenings across Canada and America.

Mangaard's quirky cinematic style gained much recognition with the release of Fish Tale Soup (1997), a romantic comedy of a contemporary couple trying to have a child, which marked her debut as a feature film writer and director. The 1998 City TV premiere garnered much critical praise and the film screened theatrically at the Carlton Cinema in Toronto and in a number of other theatres across Canada.

In 2008, Mangaard was nominated for a Gemini for Best Director of a Documentary, General Idea: Art, Aids, And The Fin De Siecle, for TVO, Bravo, SCN and Knowledge, a one-hour documentary celebrating General Idea, the Canadian artist collective. The film premiered at Toronto's Hot Doc's Film Festival 2008, and went on to screen at the Canadian Art Reel Artists Film Festival, 2009, and garner accolades at the Vancouver International Festival (VIFF), DOCSDF Mexican Documentary Film Festival and Asolo International Art Film Festival in Italy. In 2010, Mangaard produced and directed Kingaait: Riding Light into the World (2010), a film addressing the changing face of the Inuit artists of Cape Dorset for Bravo, TVO and APTN. The documentary premiered at the Art Gallery of Ontario, following a special screening celebrating Canada Day with the Canadian High Commission in Australia.

Mangaard presented solo screenings of her films in 1990 at the Pacific Cinémathèque in Vancouver, in 1991 at the Kino Arsenal at the Arsenal Institute for Film and Video Art in Berlin and again in 2002 at The Canadian Film Institute in Ottawa. In February 2009, Mangaard was invited to Argentina for a retrospective of her films at the Palais de Glace, Buenos Aires.

Her other films include Into the Night (2006), a film noir produced by the National Film Board of Canada, as well as The Many Faces of Arnaud Maggs (2004), a one-hour documentary on the celebrated Canadian artist/photographer Arnaud Maggs produced for TVO. Documentary Suzy Lake: Playing With Time (2014), premiered in November 2014 at the Art Gallery of Ontario, as part of the Introduction to the Suzy Lake exhibition, which elaborated on images of the artist over five decades.

An integral member of Toronto's film community, Mangaard has served on the boards of directors for various arts organizations including: Planet in Focus, The Toronto Arts Council, LIFT (The Liaison of Independent Filmmakers of Toronto), The Funnel, Visual Arts Ontario and the Canadian Filmmakers Distribution Centre. Mangaard is also co-founder and executive director of IMAGES: Festival Independent Film/Video.

== Themes ==
A common connection between Mangaard's earlier 16mm films stems from a longing to escape the limiting social constructs that humanity has surrounded itself with. By incorporating eroticism, travel and the power that goes along with it, Mangaard's commentary on the futility of the human experience is laid out in such films as She Bit me...Seriously (1984), a lyrical and abstract account of simple gestures of power. Her Soil is Gold (1985), There is in Power...Seduction (1985) and The Iconography of Venus (1987), all contain loose historical references that are tinged with structural critique. Historical detail enters her work again with The Tyranny of Architecture (1987), a film that overtly reverts to Mangaard's autobiographical concern. After producing North Bound Cairo (1987), Mangaard's move from the ethical questions of experimental documentary, to fiction and narrative filmmaking is present in Let Me Wrap My Arms Around You (1992), a personal work that deals with the act of appropriating the artist's life and the life of her lover.

Many of Mangaard's works have contributed an integral voice within the feminist movements in Toronto (and beyond) that were working to establish that women are here, women are creating, and women definitely deserve equal opportunities and respect. This feminist voice shines through in the careful treatment Mangaard initiates in her documentary Suzy Lake: Playing With Time (2014), where attention is directed to the role Lake played in how dramatically the art (and real) world has changed for female-identified artists... (and also how things have not changed). Her short film There is in power...seduction (1985), focused important concerns regarding gendered power imbalances, and features an exploration of the symbolic ambiguity of corporate versus sensual power. Does a woman adopt the mannerisms of a man when she enters the territory of corporate power?...The body is language. Power seduces and is seductive.

In 2011 Mangaard travelled to Sydney, and presented her video installation Hidden at the Armory Gallery alongside works from Michael Snow, Bonita Ely, Richard Goodwin, Pia Mannikko, and Ian Howard. Bonita Ely's review for the National Sculpture Magazine of China describes Hidden: "[it] takes us through liminal zones where nature and urban life are juxtaposed, both ceaselessly transforming, and interrelating". After returning to do her master's degree at OCAD University, Mangaard's work shifted from the confines of the screen to an expanded cinematic form of documentary art making. Her MFA thesis exhibition Meltdown (2017) investigates a seascape in multiple forms with media installations depicting enlarged microscopically filmed images of underwater tidal pools and a projected iceberg at various scenarios, refracted from suspended acrylic. The four-minute documentary portrays fishermen working from a repurposed fishing boat. Ice is collected using the tools associated with the harvesting of codfish, for the making of designer vodka. The juxtaposing of works comments on the impact of the environmental changes of water, from an economic, community and personal perspective.

== Selected videography and broadcasts ==
- I am the Art NOBUO KUBOTA (2025) 84 minutes. Researcher/camera/director/producer.
- Duse (2023) Director. 20 minutes. Written and acted by Jennifer Dale. Drama. Director
- Oh The Things I've Seen (2021) Writer, Producer, Director. 70 minutes. Experimental Documentary
- CBC -The Nature of Things: Dreams of the Future (2014), Researcher, Writer, Director
- Suzy Lake: Playing With Time, (62 mind), looped film projection, 2014, Researcher/Writer/Producer/Director. 62 min.
- Governor General Awards – Produced by NFB (2012)
- Scotia Bank Northern Lights Music Festival (2012), Producer/Director
- Kingaait: Riding Light into the World (2010), Co-producer/Director. Documentary 57 min. Produced by Site Media.
- Perspectives: a Series of On-Line Web Video Interviews (2009)
- General Idea: Art, Aids and the Fin de Siecle (2007), Writer/Director/Producer. 47 min.
- Into the Night (2006), Director. 65 min. Produced by National Film Board of Canada
- In Limbo (2004), Writer/Director/Producer, 5 min
- The Many Faces of Arnaud Maggs (2004), Researcher/Writer/Director/Producer. Digital. 60 min. Documentary
- Broken Dreams (2002) Super 8 and 16mm. 25 min.
- Maya’s Dream (2001), B&W. 5 min.
- Fish Tale Soup (1997), Director/Writer. 35mm. Produced by NFB/Three Blondes Inc/Actuality Films
- 94 Arcana Drive (1994), Director. 16mm. 20 min. Produced by Canadian Film Centre.
- Let me wrap my arms around you (1992), Writer/Director/Producer. 16mm. 24 min.
- A Dialogue with Vision: The Art of Spring Hurlbut and Judith Schwarz (1990), Writer/Director. Producer, 16mm. 27 min.
- Northbound Cairo (1987), Writer/Director. Producer, 16mm. 23 min.
- The Iconography of Venus (1987), Writer/Director. Producer 16mm. 5 Min.
- The Tyranny of Architecture (1987), Writer/Director. Producer 16mm. 10 Min.
- Her Soil is Gold (1985), Writer/Director. Producer 16mm. 10 Min
- There is in power…Seduction (1985), Writer/Director. Producer. 16mm. 5 Min.
- She Bit Me Seriously (1984), Writer/Director. Producer. SUPER 8. 20 Min.
- Nothing By Mouth (1984), Writer/Director. Producer SUPER 8, 10 Min.
- Line Through Bath Filmmaker. (1984), Filmmaker. SUPER 8. 10 min. Documentary of Eric Snell’s conceptual piece running a line through Bath, UK

== Notable exhibitions and residencies ==
- Come Into My Kitchen, installation at The Varley Art Gallery. Sept 14, 2019 - Jan 4, 2020.
- Under Pressure: by Annette Mangaard and Bey Weyman. An outdoor projection for Nuit Blanche, Toronto 2019
- Water Fall: A Cinematic Installation, on at Charles Street Video, May 9–June 15, 2019.
- Two Rooms Revisited (Group Exhibition), Grad Gallery, OCADU, (2017)
- Take Me To The River, Video Installation, Commissioned by MetalCulture, UK. Touring to South-on Sea, Liverpool, and Manchester, UK, Broken Hill, Australia (2011)
- Hidden, Video Installation, Sydney Olympic Park, Australia, (2011)
- Water: Ana High Altitude Shepherdess, Photography Series, CONTACT Festival: What's Your Revolution, TTC LED Screens, (2009)
- Photography 101: Push The Button, Photography Series, Group show. Confederation Art Centre, Charlottetown, (2008)
- I Am Curious Yorkville, Interactive Video Installation, Nuit Blanche Commissioned by Peggy Gale/Fern Bayer Area ‘B’ Yorkville, (2007)
- Artist-in-residence w. Nobuo Kubota. Charles Street Video and IMAGES Festival (2006)
- In Limbo, commissioned installation for INVASIONS/ELEMENTS screened at Whitefish Lake First Nation and the Gladstone Hotel in Toronto, (2005)

== Awards ==
- Canada Council Production Grant (2018)
- Chalmers Fellowship (2018)
- Gold Medal Award, MFA, OCADU (2017)
- Canada Council Travel Grant (2013)
- Ontario Arts Council Production Grant (2012)
- Canada Council Travel Grant (2011)
- Canada Council Production Grant (2011)
- Toronto Arts Council Production Grant (2006)
- Ontario Arts Council, Production Grant (1999)
- Ontario Arts Council, Film Production Grant (1998)
- Foundation to Underwrite New Drama, Script Development (1993)
- Ontario Arts Council, Film Production Grant (1992)
- Ontario Arts Council, Film Production Grant (1991)
- Canadian Non-Theatrical Fund, Film Production Grant (1989)
- Liaison of Independent Filmmakers of Toronto, Film Co-Production (1989)
