= Litera =

Litera may refer to:

- Litera (company), American software company
- La Litera, comarca (administrative division) in Huesca, Aragon, Spain
- Ivan Litera (born 1976), Serbian footballer
