= Annette Court =

British businesswoman (born 1962)

- Born: 24 March 1962 (age 64); Birmingham
- Education: St Catherine's College, Oxford
- Occupation: Businesswoman
- Title: Chair, WH Smith PLC
- Term: December 2022 - present
- Children: 2

Annette Elizabeth Court (born 24 March 1962) is a British businesswoman, who has been Chair of WH Smith PLC since December 2022.

Court studied engineering at the University of Oxford, before joining IBM as a systems engineer in the banking and insurance sectors in 1983. She joined Direct Line in 1994, becoming CEO in 2001. She later became CEO of RBS Insurance when both companies were subsidiaries of Royal Bank of Scotland. In 2007, she joined Zurich as CEO of their European general insurance business, a role she held until 2010.

Court previously held positions as non-executive director of Jardine Lloyd Thomson Group, Workshare and Foxtons, and previously served as a member on the Board of the Association of British Insurers (ABI).

Court was appointed to the board of the Sage Group plc on 1 April 2019.

She completed an executive education programme at Harvard Business School. She has two children.
