= Louis Kaufman =

American violinist (1905–1994)

- Born: May 10, 1905; Portland, Oregon
- Died: February 9, 1994 (aged 88) Los Angeles, California
- Instrument: Violin

Louis Kaufman (May 10, 1905 – February 9, 1994) was an American violinist. He played on the soundtrack of as many as 500 movies and made over 100 musical recordings. He is also credited with reviving the music of Antonio Vivaldi with his recording of The Four Seasons in 1947, which won the Grand Prix du Disque in 1950, was elected to the Grammy Hall of Fame in 2002, and in 2003 was selected for the Library of Congress’s National Recording Registry.

== Life and career ==
Kaufman was born in Portland, Oregon. His parents were Romanian Jews, from a remarkable beneficent culture. With the recommendation of Maud Powell and Efrem Zimbalist, he started at the age of 13 to study with Franz Kneisel in New York City at the Institute of Musical Art, now Juilliard. He played the viola with the Musical Art Quartet from 1926 to 1933. His solo recital debut at New York's Town Hall in 1928 was under the auspices of the Naumburg Award.

Subsequently, he performed chamber music with Pablo Casals, Mischa Elman, Jascha Heifetz, Fritz Kreisler, Gregor Piatigorsky, Efrem Zimbalist and Alfredo Rossi. In 1948 he also emerged under the baton of Alfredo Antonini with the CBS Symphony Orchestra in a performance of Antonio Vivaldi's Violin Concertos, Op. 8, No. 1-4 for broadcast by Voice of America.

He was an accomplished violinist, playing 15-minute radio recitals when he was asked to play the soundtrack for Ernst Lubitsch's movie The Merry Widow; this performance opened up a long career in performing soundtracks for Hollywood films, including such classics as Casablanca, Gone with the Wind, The Diary of Anne Frank, Wuthering Heights, The Grapes of Wrath, and Spartacus. It is variously estimated that he made 400 solo performances for movies and acted as the concertmaster for several hundred.

He also premiered a number of pieces by notable 20th-century composers, including works by Aaron Copland, Darius Milhaud, and Bohuslav Martinů, and made the premiere recording of Samuel Barber's violin concerto.

He and his wife, the pianist Annette Kaufman (née Leibole) often performed together. In September 2003, she published his memoir A Fiddler's Tale - How Hollywood and Vivaldi Discovered Me with the University of Wisconsin Press (ISBN 0-299-18380-7), with Louis Kaufman as principal author and Annette Kaufman as co-author. Annette Kaufman died, aged 101, in 2016 in Los Angeles, California.

The couple donated a large collection of personal papers to the Library of Congress in 2000, which included papers from such notables as Leonard Bernstein, Jascha Heifetz, and others. They also donated a large art collection to the National Gallery of Art and Syracuse University.

Kaufman died, aged 88, in Los Angeles, California.

== Notes ==
=== Sources ===
- The Strad - June 1973: p. 70-79. Mell, Albert Carlo Bisiach (1892–1968)
- The Strad - July 1973: p. 135–145. Mell, Albert Carlo Bisiach (1892–1968)

=== References ===
- Library of Congress profile of Louis Kaufman
- "Louis Kaufman, Violinist, 88". The New York Times. February 12, 1994.
- Louis Kaufman and Annette Kaufman: A Fiddler's Tale: How Vivaldi and Hollywood Discovered Me: My Adventures in Music and Art. 2003. University of Wisconsin Press. ISBN 0-299-18380-7
- WNYC Fishko Files on Louis Kaufman

== Violins ==
Antonio Stradivari, violin 1727 Barrere Giovanni Battista Guadagnini, violin 1774 ex-Beel Guadagnini violin 1775c ex-Zimbalist; ex-Kaufman Nicolas Lupot, violin 1809 Jean-Baptiste Vuillaume violin copy of "La Pucelle" Stradivari #1489 c.1839, and a violin by Carlo Bisiach G.B. Guadagnini model (was featured in the STRAD magazine June-July 1973)
