= Anette Prehn =

Danish author, sociologist

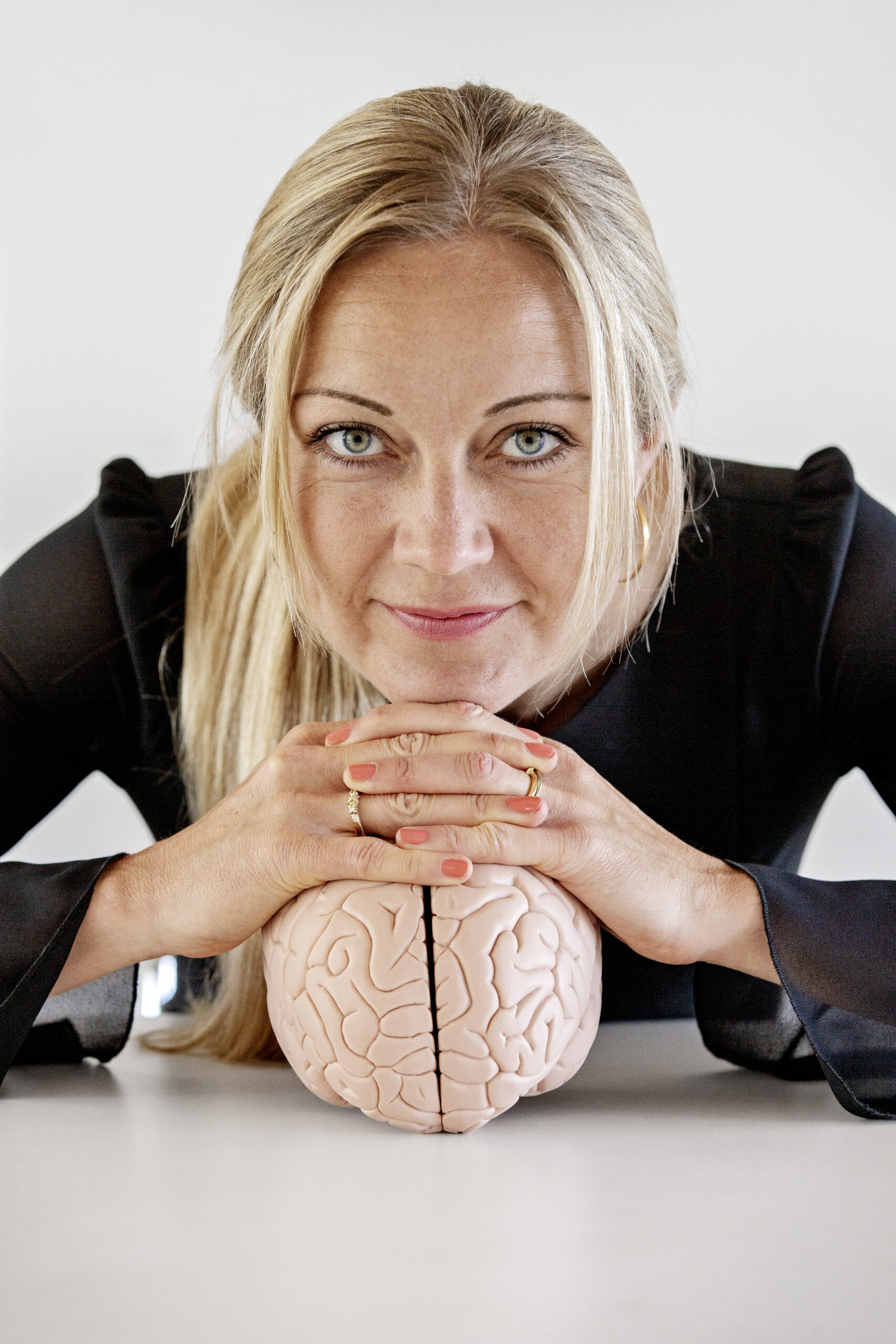
Prehn in 2023

Anette Prehn (born 1975) is a Danish author, sociologist, keynote speaker and MD of Centre for Brain-Based Leadership and Learning.

She is the author of 20+ non-fiction books about the rules of the brain, which are published in seven languages, among these English, Chinese, Russian and German.

Her book Play Your Brain was published in 2011 by Marshall Cavendish International and is her first book written in English.

In 2015–2016, Anette Prehn's BRAINSMART trilogy was published in Danish. The series contain Brainsmart Parenting, Brainsmart Leadership and Brainsmart Pedagogy. Currently, Anette Prehn is writing a series of seven mini books for the 10+ year olds.

The Danish schools and education publication Folkeskolen writes of Hjernesmarte Børn "Science communication at a high level that connects modern neurology with classical social psychology. The book is also reviewed in the Danish national newspaper Politiken by professor Svend Brinkmann and was featured in the article "Goodbye Freud, Hello Amygdala" in Dagbladet Information.

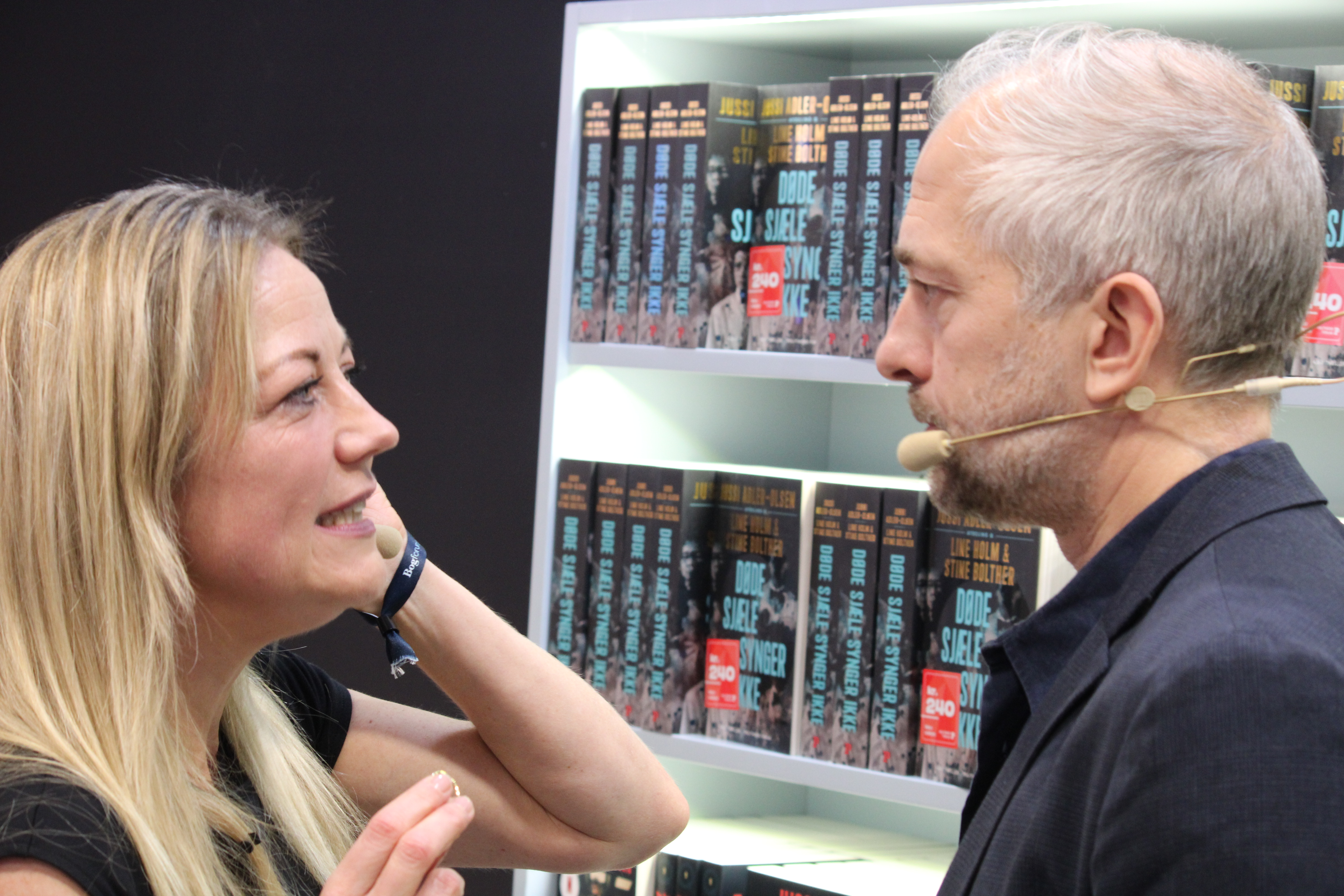
Prehn with Jonas Kuld Rathje at Bogforum 2025

Anette Prehn is blogging about Brainsmart Leadership and Brainsmart children on Brainsmart.today

== Books ==
- Ansvar (Dafolo, 2020) ISBN 9788771609790
- Afledte effekter People'sPress, 2019) ISBN 9788770365819
- Udbryderkongen og Indbrudstyven (Dafolo, 2019) ISBN 9788771608625
- FLIP (People'sPress, 2018) ISBN 9788772007410
- Din kreative hjerne (Dafolo, 2018) ISBN 9788771608434
- Tag nye billeder med hjernen (Dafolo, 2018) ISBN 9788771608496
- Giv hjernen plads til udvikling (Dafolo, 2018) ISBN 9788771608410
- Sov dig til en bedre hjerne (Dafolo, 2017) ISBN 9788771608403
- Gør hjernen til en medspiller (2017), Dafolo. ISBN 978-87-7160-681-2
- Bliv ven med hjernens amygdala (2017), Dafolo. ISBN 978-87-7160-680-5
- Stierne i hjernen (2017), Dafolo. ISBN 978-87-7160-679-9
- Hjernesmart Ledelse (2016), People's Press. ISBN 9788771800043
- Hjernesmarte Børn (2015), People's Press. ISBN 9788771592474
- Hjernesmart Pædagogik (2016), Dafolo. ISBN 9788771601770
- Create Reframing Mindsets Through Framestorm (artikel i NeuroLeadership Journal, Issue Four, 2012)
- Play your Brain (2011), Marshall Cavendish International. ISBN 9789814328586
- Coach dig selv (2010), Gyldendal Business Publishing. ISBN 9788702108583
- Coaching i perspektiv (s.m. Kim Gørtz, Hans Reitzels, 2008) ISBN 9788741251417
