= Annette Oxenius =

Swiss immunologist and academic

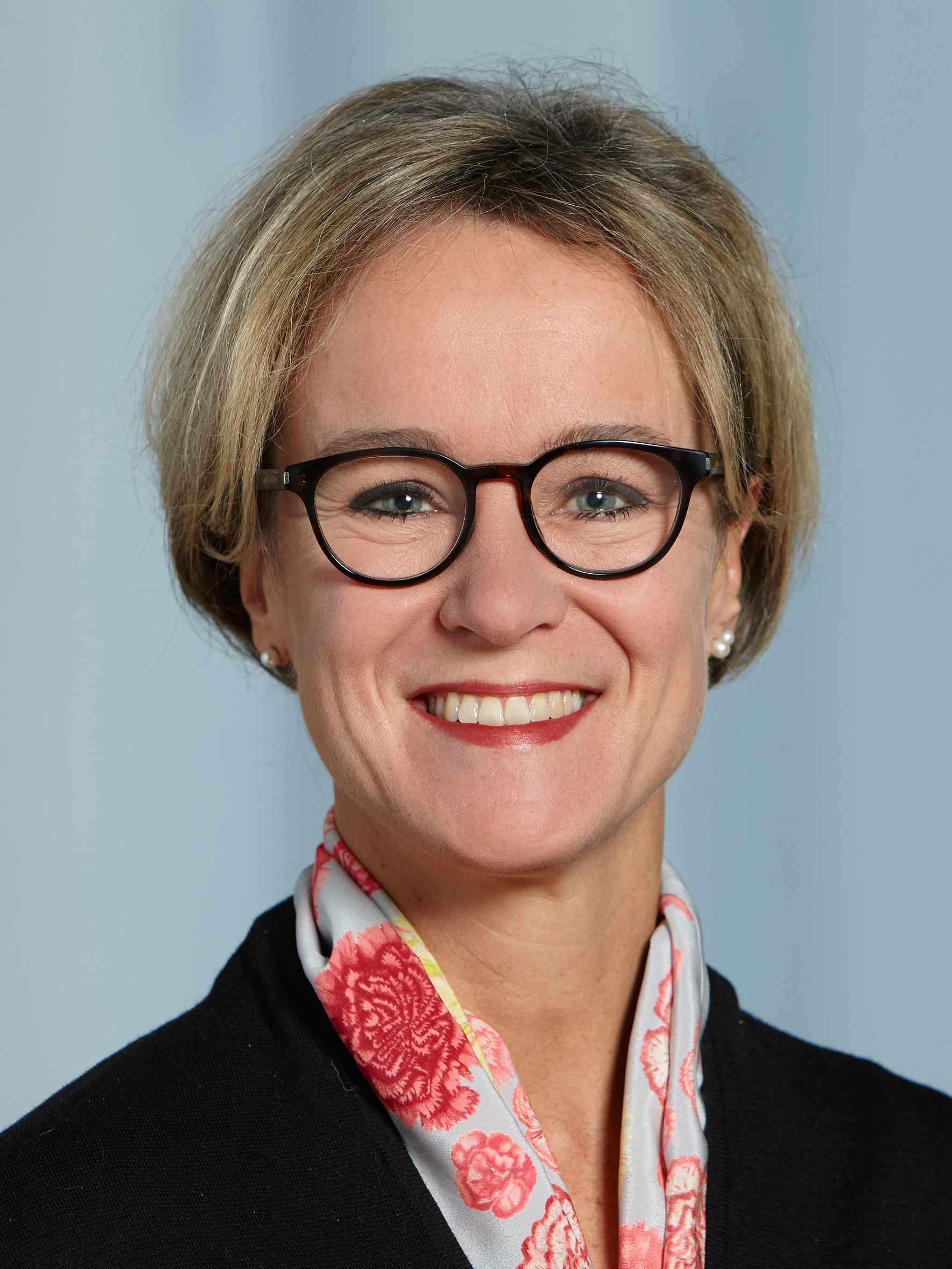
- Born: November 10, 1968 (age 57); Zürich, Switzerland
- Education: ETH Zurich; University of Oxford
- Scientific career
- Workplaces: University of Zurich; ETH Zurich
- Thesis: Generation of TCR transgenic mice to study virus-specific CD4 + T cell responses in vivo (1997)

Annette Oxenius (born 10 November 1968) is a Swiss immunologist who is a professor of immunology at ETH Zurich. Her research considers host-pathogen interactions and how the immune system responds to pathogenic infections. She was awarded the Cloëtta Prize in 2022 and elected member of the European Molecular Biology Organization in 2023.

== Early life and education ==
Oxenius was born in Zürich and went to school there. She studied biochemistry and immunology at the University of Zurich, where she worked in the Institute for Experimental Immunology. She moved to ETH Zurich for her doctoral research, where she generated genetically modified T-cell receptor mice to understand T cell-mediated immune responses. She was a postdoctoral researcher in ETH Zurich and University of Oxford.

== Research and career ==
In 2002, Oxenius joined the faculty at ETH Zurich, where she was made full professor in 2012. Oxenius studies the interactions between pathogens and their hosts. She is interested in how immune system cells eliminate viral infections. She has studied cellular immunity in patients infected with HIV and the cellular pathways involved in viral infections.

== Awards and honours ==
- 2002 Swiss Society for Microbiology Encouragement Awards
- 2006 Clausthal-Zellerfeld Prize
- 2022 Cloëtta Prize
- 2023 Elected Member of European Molecular Biology Organization

== Selected publications ==
- Daniel C Douek; Jason M Brenchley; Michael R Betts; et al. (1 May 2002). "HIV preferentially infects HIV-specific CD4+ T cells". Nature. 417 (6884): 95–98. Bibcode:2002Natur.417...95D. doi:10.1038/417095a. ISSN 1476-4687. PMID 11986671. Wikidata Q33958893.
- Andrea Cossarizza; Hyun-Dong Chang; Andreas Radbruch; et al. (1 October 2017). "Guidelines for the use of flow cytometry and cell sorting in immunological studies". European Journal of Immunology. 47 (10) (1st ed.): 1584–1797. doi:10.1002/eji.201646632. ISSN 0014-2980. PMID 29023707. Wikidata Q41918189.
- Alexandra Trkola; Herbert Kuster; Peter Rusert; et al. (8 May 2005). "Delay of HIV-1 rebound after cessation of antiretroviral therapy through passive transfer of human neutralizing antibodies". Nature medicine. 11 (6): 615–622. doi:10.1038/nm1244. ISSN 1078-8956. PMID 15880120. S2CID 9199412. Wikidata Q57226425.
