= IdeaPlane =

British social networking platform

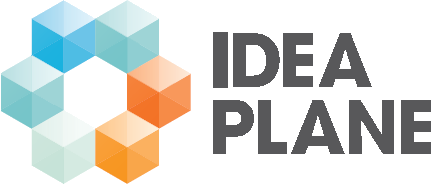
- Company type: Private company
- Industry: Regulatory technology social software
- Founded: 2010
- Founder: James Fabricant
- Defunct: 2012
- Fate: Acquired
- Successor: Workshare
- Headquarters: London, United Kingdom
- Key people: James Fabricant, CEO; Francesco Bovoli, CTO
- Products: IdeaPlane Platform
- Services: Consulting
- Website: www.ideaplane.com

IdeaPlane was a British enterprise social networking platform designed for companies in heavily regulated industries, particularly financial services. Specializing in compliance, IdeaPlane tailored its platform to help companies adhere to regulations from organizations such as the U.S. Financial Industry Regulatory Authority, Financial Services Authority, and U.S. Securities and Exchange Commission.

Founded in 2010 by James Fabricant, IdeaPlane was headquartered in London, with additional offices in New York and San Francisco. The company was acquired by competitor Workshare in November 2012.

== History ==
Prior to founding IdeaPlane, James Fabricant co-founded and served as the Director of Business Development and Media, Europe, at MySpace International.

The company was acquired by Workshare in November 2012.

== Products and services ==
IdeaPlane's social networking platform targeted financial institutions and other highly regulated industries. IdeaPlane's platform used similar practices from existing social networks like Twitter and Facebook.

IdeaPlane provided technology, enterprise social networking consultancy and software development services.

According to TechCrunch, IdeaPlane launched with two top-10 global investment banks as founding clients.
