= Annette van Dyck-Hemming =

German musicologist (born 1965)

Annette van Dyck-Hemming (born in 1965) is a German musicologist.

== Life ==
Possibly born in Wesel, from 1984 to 1993, Dyck-Hemming studied musicology, catholic church history and old German studies at the University of Bochum. She completed this study with a master's degree. From 1996 to 1998, Dyck-Hemming completed further training as CBT software developer. Von 1999 bis 2002 promovierte sie an der University of Bonn and finished the dissertation with Diskurse zur Musik Elliott Carters.

From 1998 to 2000, Dyck-Hemming worked as a freelance lecturer in the field of IT and multimedia. From 2002 to 2012 she worked as project coordinator, editor and author in the context of updating the Riemann Musiklexikon. Since 2014, Dyck-Hemming has been a research assistant at the Max-Planck-Institut für empirische Ästhetik in Frankfurt.

Dyck-Hemming's main research interests include the history of musicology, music historiography, music sociology and music aesthetics. She participates in the MPI project "Geschichte der deutschsprachigen Musikwissenschaft".

== Work ==
- Beiträge zur Jahrestagung der Gesellschaft für Musikforschung in Kassel 2017 : Das Populäre in der Musik und das Musikverlagswesen] (2019)
- Vom Datum zum historischen Zusammenhang : Möglichkeiten und Grenzen einer fachgeschichtlichen Datenbank.
- Diskurse zur "Musik Elliott Carters" : Versuch einer dekonstruktiven Hermeneutik "Moderner Musik".

== Source ==
- Max-Planck-Institut für empirische Ästheitk. "Vita Annette van Dyck-Hemming" (in German).
