= Annette Conlon =

American singer-songwriter

Annette Hartung Conlon
- Also known as: Nette
- Born: Annette Loraine Hartung; Ohio, U.S.
- Origin: Colorado Springs, Colorado, U.S.
- Genres: Country · Americana · Folk · Singer Songwriter
- Occupation: singer songwriter · musician · animal rights activist
- Instrument: guitar
- Website: http://www.annetteconlon.com

Annette Conlon (born June 19), is an American born songwriter, acoustic guitar player, vegan, and founder of the Compassionette Tour: a music tour, uniting music, fashion, food, and compassionate living. She is based in Culver City, California. Her Country/Americana music release Life, Death, and the Spaces Between was named #3 by Paul Riley in "Critic's Choice Top Ten Best Albums of 2015" in Country Music People's Jan, 2016 issue. She co-writes songs with husband Doug Conlon for Dallas alternative rock band Eden Automatic.

Tofurky and Mercy for Animals lend support to the Compassionette Tour by providing coupon booklets, compassionate counter-culture cards, and flyers to pass out along the way.

== Biography ==
=== Early life ===
Annette Hartung Conlon was born in Ohio to Joyce Hartung, a paralegal secretary, and Don M. Hartung, then a Major in the United States Air Force. A military child, Conlon grew up in several different military bases and cities throughout the United States, her one constant was participating in choir.

=== 1992-1994 The Denver years ===
Conlon joined her first rock band, the short-lived "Love Garage and the Earth Muffins" when one of the background singers left. When Love Garage broke up, Conlon and lead singer Doug Conlon moved on to form Somebody's Sister, a band widely supported by the Denver rock scene, but as not supported by the local media. When their single Barney (based on the purple dinosaur) started to hit college charts, a label out of Dallas contacted the duo. The label folded shortly after Annette, Doug, and drummer Gino Jones relocated to Dallas, Texas.

=== 1995-2006 The Dallas years ===
Not long after moving to Dallas, Texas, the group was contacted by a Boston area band claiming they owned the copyright to the name Somebody's Sister. Voting between all four band members (bass player Chris Harris had joined the band) the name Eden Automatic was born, and with it came the group's more alternative rock sound. From the late 1990s through early 2000s Eden Automatic toured the states of Texas, through New Mexico, Colorado, Oklahoma, Louisiana, Mississippi, Alabama, and Florida. Eden Automatic released four CDs. During this time Conlon went from sharing the stage to fronting the stage. She shared more of the songwriting duties and began penning her own songs. In 2002, struggling with vocal polyps from smoking, the band took a three-month break from touring while Annette recovered. Back on the road, and back in the studio, Annette struggled to find the powerhouse voice previously referenced to as Blondie, Portishead, and Jefferson Airplane and another six weeks of vocal isolation was needed in order to complete vocals for As For Now. The band started to book more acoustic gigs and less full band gigs. Not long after, Doug and Annette Conlon relocated to Culver City, California, and then bassist Greg Terhune moved to Candler, North Carolina.

=== 2007-present California ===
During her first few years in California, Conlon performed with husband Doug Conlon under the moniker "The Conlons." It was not until she became ill with a retropharyngeal abscess and almost died in 2012 that things would change. After a two-year recovery Conlon began writing a solo record based on the emotional recovery of her illness. This record was funded by a successful Kickstarter campaign. At this point, Conlon began performing under her own name, Annette Conlon, and performs either solo, accompanied by Doug Conlon, or by a full band. Her vocal cords and health fully restored, Conlon embarked on the Compassionette Tour September 24-October 1, 2016, uniting music, fashion, food, and compassionate living.

== Personal life ==
=== Veganism and animal rights ===
Conlon is a vegan and supports animal rights. She wrote and recorded the song "Sea of Red or a Sea of Green" for National Animal Rights Day 2016.

=== Charity ===
Conlon is the creator of NetteRadio, a long-running internet radio show dedicated to supporting independent women in music. She has produced more than 54 artist showcases that also raise funds for a variety of charities. For this, she has been recognized by the American Red Cross.

== Discography ==
- Post Grunge Glam (with Somebody's Sister) (1994)
- Earthy Pleasures and Erotic Delights (with Eden Automatic) (1998)
- Glimmer (with Eden Automatic) (2000)
- Not Your Familiar (with Eden Automatic) (2003)
- As For Now (with Eden Automatic) (2006)
- Life, Death, and the Spaces Between (2015)
