= Social Dynamics: A Journal of African Studies =

Social Dynamics
- Discipline: African studies
- Language: English
- Edited by: Christopher Ouma, Bernard Dubbeld, Lauren Paremoer

Publication details
- History: 1975–present
- Publisher: Routledge, in association with the Centre for African Studies, University of Cape Town (South Africa)
- Frequency: Triannually
- Impact factor: 0.483 (2021)

Standard abbreviations
- ISO 4: Soc. Dyn.: J. Afr. Stud.

Indexing
- ISSN: 0253-3952 (print); 1940-7874 (web)
- LCCN: 78645757
- OCLC no.: 1058064108

Links
- Journal homepage; Online access; Online archive; Journal page at Centre for African Studies website

Social Dynamics: A Journal of African Studies is a triannual peer-reviewed academic journal published by Routledge in association with the Centre for African Studies (University of Cape Town). It was established in 1975 and covers African studies. The editors-in-chief are Christopher Ouma (University of Cape Town), Bernard Dubbeld (Stellenbosch University), and Lauren Paremoer (University of Cape Town).

== Abstracting and indexing ==
The journal is abstracted and indexed in:

- Current Contents/Social and Behavioral Sciences
- EBSCO databases
- Index Islamicus
- Modern Language Association Database
- ProQuest databases
- Scopus
- Social Sciences Citation Index
- CSA databases

According to the Journal Citation Reports, the journal has a 2021 impact factor of 0.483.
