= Annette Hug =

Swiss author

Annette Hug (born July 10, 1970) is a Swiss writer.

== Life ==
Annette Hug was born on July 10, 1970 in Zürich. She grew up in Stallikon near Zürich and graduated from the Cantonal School Wiedikon in Zürich. Hug studied for a bachelor's degree in history at the University of Zurich and a master's in women and development studies at the University of the Philippines Diliman in Metro Manila. She has worked as a lecturer and union secretary of the VPOD. Hug lived in the Philippines for a long time and was active in the local women's movement. Today she works as a freelance author in Zürich and is a board member of the Association of Swiss Authors.

She has been married to Stefan Keller since 2010.

== Work ==
- Lady Berta. Rotpunktverlag. 2008. ISBN 978-3-85869-362-4
- In Zelenys Zimmer. Rotpunktverlag. 2010. ISBN 978-3-85869-425-6
- Wilhelm Tell in Manila. Das Wunderhorn. 2016. ISBN 978-3-88423-518-8
- Tiefenlager. Roman. Das Wunderhorn. 2021. ISBN 978-3-88423-649-9

== Awards ==
- 2017: Schweizer Literaturpreis for Wilhelm Tell in Manila
- 2022: ZKB-Schillerpreis for Tiefenlager
