= Annette Kim =

American academic and urban planner

Annette Miae Kim
- Occupation: Associate Professor

Academic background
- Education: Wellesley College (BA); Harvard University (MA); University of California, Berkeley (MA, PhD)
- Thesis: Making a Market: The Institutions Supporting Ho Chi Minh City's Urban Land Development Market (2002)

Academic work
- Discipline: Housing and Land Use; International Development Planning; Art and Culture Placemaking; Urban Spatial Data and Visualization
- Institutions: USC Price School of Public Policy; Massachusetts Institute of Technology

Annette Kim is an American academic and urban planner. Kim is an associate professor at the University of Southern California Price School of Public Policy, and Director of the Spatial Analysis Lab (SLAB). Kim previously served as associate professor at MIT's Department of Urban Studies and Planning.

Kim has commented extensively on the sidewalk economy in Ho Chi Minh City, Vietnam, and on the recent sidewalk clearing campaign led by the District 1 People's Committee. Kim published Sidewalk City: Remapping Public Space in Ho Chi Minh City in 2015, which presented an ethnography of public space in Ho Chi Minh City that provides usage to pedestrians and street vendors alike.

== Publications ==
- Learning to be Capitalists: Entrepreneurs in Vietnam's Transition Economy (2008)
- Sidewalk City: Remapping Public Space in Ho Chi Minh City (2015)
