= Annette Faße =

German politician (born 1947)

Member of the Bundestag; from Lower Saxony
- In office 10 November 1994 – 27 October 2009
- Preceded by: Wolfgang von Geldern
- Succeeded by: Constituency abolished
- Constituency: Cuxhaven (1994–2002); Cuxhaven – Osterholz (2002–2009)
- In office 18 February 1987 – 20 December 1990
- Constituency: State list

Personal details
- Born: Annette Ehlen; 6 September 1947 (age 79) Geestland, Germany
- Party: Social Democratic
- Children: 2

Annette Faße (née Ehlen; born 6 September 1947) is a German politician (SPD).

== Early life and career ==
After graduating from secondary school with Mittlere Reife, Annette Faße attended a school for educators, which she left as a state-certified educator. She then worked as the head of a kindergarten and later as an employee at a school for physically disabled children. She also worked independently in adult education and was chairwoman of the supervisory board of the adult education center in the Cuxhaven district until November 2023.

== Political career ==
She has been a member of the SPD since 1972 and was chairwoman of the SPD sub-district of Cuxhaven for many years. Since September 4, 2010, Annette Faße has been deputy chairwoman of the state party council of the SPD Lower Saxony.

Annette Faße was a member of the German Bundestag for the first time from 1987 to 1990. She was again a member of the German Bundestag from 1994 until 2009. Here she was deputy spokesperson for the transport, construction and housing working group of the SPD parliamentary group from 1998 to 2002 and also for the tourism working group from 1998 to 2005. From 2002 to 2005 she was also deputy chair of the Committee on Transport, Construction and Housing.

From January 2005 until 2009 she was the spokesperson for the SPD parliamentary group's tourism working group.

Annette Faße entered the Bundestag in 1987 via the Lower Saxony state list and from 1994 onwards as a directly elected member of the Cuxhaven constituency and, since 2002, of the Cuxhaven – Osterholz constituency. In the 2005 federal election, she received 49.8% of the first votes there.

In June 2008, Annette Faße announced that she would not run for the Bundestag again. She resigned from the Bundestag after the 2009 federal election.

== Personal life ==
Annette Faße is married and has two sons.
