= Svend Brinkmann =

Danish psychologist

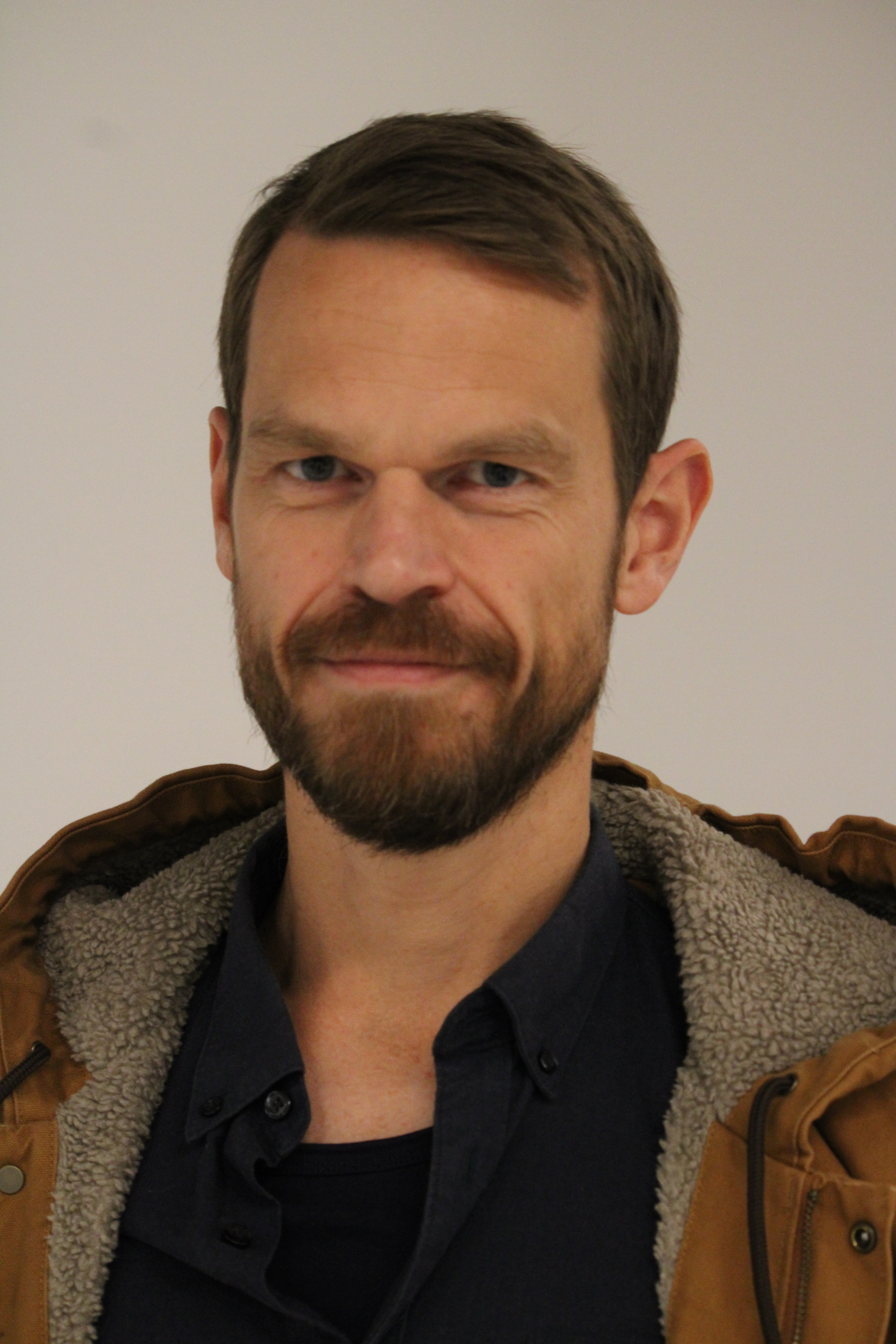
- Brinkmann in 2025
- Born: December 23, 1975 (age 50); Herning, Denmark
- Citizenship: Denmark
- Education: Aarhus University (Ph.D.)
- Scientific career
- Fields: Psychology, philosophical psychology, moral psychology, ethics and cultural critique
- Workplaces: Aalborg University, Aalborg, Denmark

Svend Brinkmann is a Danish Professor of Psychology in the Department of Communication and Psychology at Aalborg University, Denmark. He serves as a co-director of the Center for Qualitative Studies. His research primarily involves philosophical, moral, and methodological issues in psychology and other human and social sciences. In recent years, Brinkmann has been studying the impact of psychiatric diagnoses on individuals and society.

== Education ==
Svend Brinkmann received his BA in philosophy in 1999 from Aarhus University. In 2000, he received his BSc in psychology. In 2002, Svend Brinkmann graduated as an MSc in psychology, and in 2006 he was awarded a PhD degree in psychology from Aarhus University.

== Books ==
Svend Brinkmann has been author or co-author on several books, many of which have been translated into English. A list of his books is presented below:

- John Dewey (2007) ISBN 9788741202396
- Identitet (2008) ISBN 9788779556003
- Psykens historier i Danmark (with Peter Triantafillou, 2008) ISBN 9788759313992
- Psyken (2009) ISBN 9788779343870
- Det diagnosticerede liv (2010) ISBN 9788771299021
- Nye perspektiver på stress (with Malene Friis Andersen, 2013) ISBN 9788771291674
- Kvalitativ udforskning af hverdagslivet (2013) ISBN 9788741256634
- Det kvalitative interview (2014) ISBN 9788741258645
- Stå fast (2014) ISBN 9788702161755
- Kvalitative metoder (with Lene Tanggaard, 2015) ISBN 9788741259048
- Interview (with Steinar Kvale, 2015, 3. udgave) ISBN 9788741263779
- Diagnoser. Perspektiver, kritik og diskussion (with Anders Petersen, 2015) ISBN 9788771296495
- Positiv og negativ psykologi (with Hans Henrik Knoop, 2016) ISBN 9788702193855
- Selvrealisering (with Cecilie Eriksen, 2016) ISBN 9788771299038
- Ståsteder (2016) ISBN 9788702192223
- Gå Glip (2017) ISBN 9788702245349
- The Joy of Missing Out: The Art of Self-Restraint in an Age of Excess (2019) ISBN 9781509531578
