= African Security Review =

- Discipline: African studies, defence, food policy, national security, politics
- Language: English

Publication details
- History: 1992–present
- Publisher: Institute for Security Studies (South Africa)

Standard abbreviations
- ISO 4: Afr. Secur. Rev.

Indexing
- ISSN: 1024-6029
- OCLC no.: 62584405

Links
- Journal homepage

The African Security Review is the quarterly journal of the Institute for Security Studies (ISS). It provides a regular forum for the dissemination of research findings and information through the publication of research reports, policy papers and articles on security and related issues in sub-Saharan Africa. The journal was previously published as the African Defence Review (1994) and the Southern African Defence Review (1992–1993).
