= Ian Howard =

Australian rules footballer

Personal information
- Full name: Ian Howard
- Born: 17 October 1939
- Original team: Kyabram
- Height: 175 cm (5 ft 9 in)
- Weight: 67 kg (148 lb)

Playing career^{1}
Years	Club	Games (Goals)
1960	Footscray	16 (0)
- ^{1} Playing statistics correct to the end of 1960.

Ian Howard (born 17 October 1939) is a former Australian rules footballer who played with Footscray in the Victorian Football League (VFL).
