= Annette E. McCrea =

American landscape architect (1858–1928)

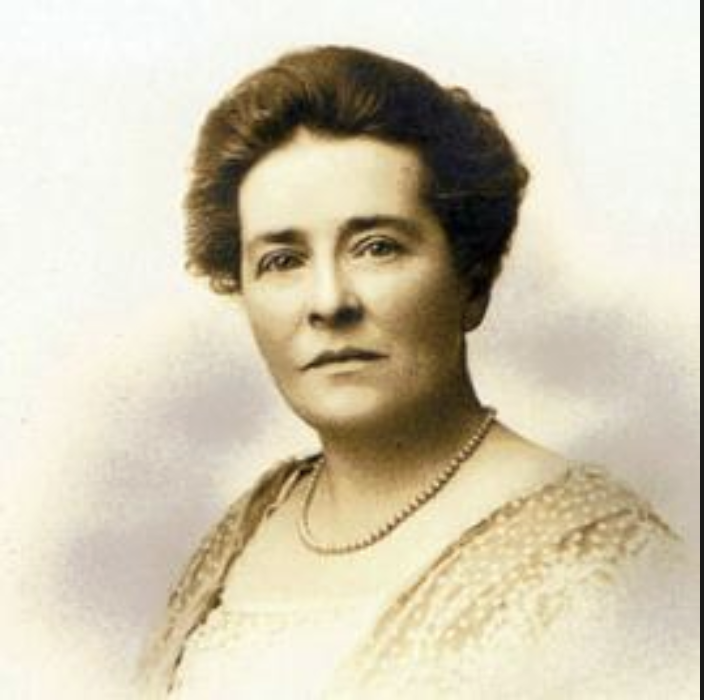
- Born: Annette E. Maxson; July 16, 1858; Cooperstown, New York, U.S.
- Died: September 20, 1928 (aged 70); Minneapolis Minnesota, U.S.
- Occupation: landscape architect
- Years active: 1892-1910
- Known for: First woman landscape architect in the U.S.

Annette E. McCrea (née, Maxson; 1858–1928) was a pioneer American landscape architect, and the first woman in that role in the U.S. The most original line of her work was the planning of grounds and stations for the railroads, becoming a consulting landscape architect for a number of railroads. She laid out the grounds around railroad stations, decided upon the painting of depots and freight stations, and made plans for improving the surroundings of the railroads. She was a pioneer in this work, and in connection with her railroad work, she organized town and village improvement societies.

== Early life ==
Annette E. Maxson was born in Cooperstown, New York, July 16, 1858.

== Career ==
After her husband, Frank McCrea, died in Detroit, in 1892, McCrea was left alone to support and educate her two daughters. She had had no business or professional experience and there were at that time no schools giving courses in landscape gardening for women. As McCrea had helped her husband in his work as expert gardener, and because she knew something of shrubs, trees and soils, she decided to try to get work along these lines, by taking over his business in Kalamazoo, Michigan, a wholesale nursery. For some time in Kalamazoo, she worked as a landscape artist. Her first work of that kind in this city was on the Frank Henderson place on West Main Street, later known as the Bertrand Hopper property.

In 1893, she came to Chicago and convinced the Lincoln Park board that the position of landscape architect should be created and that she should be given the position.

When political differences led to her removal from that office, McCrea obtained similar positions with railroads during the period of 1900-1910 --Illinois Central Railroad , Chicago, St. Paul and Minneapolis Railway, Chicago, Burlington and Quincy Railroad, Chicago and North Western Railway, and Chicago, Rock Island and Pacific Railroad. The field she developed was half-way between the work of the horticulturist and the work of the architect. In addition to planning the station's landscape design, she arrived with carloads of trees, flowers, and shrubs, traveling from station to station along the right-of-way of the railroads that employed her. Each station that she worked on, she surrounded with a garden. Lack of money and lack of interest prevented any complete reformation of the railway stations.

McCrea was known as the landscape architect for the grounds of Michigan College of Mines, a normal school, a prison, and many private homes.

She was instrumental in introducing landscape architecture in the curricula of U.S. colleges.

McCrea served as the chair of the Committee on Railroad Grounds of the American Park and Outdoor Art Association (now American Planning and Civic Association) (ca. 1900). She was a member of the Chicago Woman's Club.

In 1917, she moved to De Pere, Wisconsin. Later, she moved to Minneapolis, Minnesota where she was well known to florists for her work in local flower shows.

== Death ==
Annette E. McCrea died in Minneapolis, on September 20, 1928; she was 64 years old. Interment was at Mountain Home Cemetery, Kalamazoo.
