= Annette Volfing =

Danish-British scholar of German literature (born 1965)

Annette Volfing FBA
- Born: Annette Marianne Volfing; 5 February 1965 (age 61); Copenhagen, Denmark
- Citizenship: Danish; British (since 2017)
- Occupations: Literary scholar and poet
- Title: Professor of Medieval German Literature

Academic background
- Education: St Edmund Hall, Oxford
- Thesis: A commentary on Der meide kranz by Henrich von Mügeln (1993)
- Doctoral advisor: Nigel F. Palmer

Academic work
- Discipline: German literature
- Sub-discipline: Middle High German literature; Christian devotional literature
- Institutions: Oriel College, Oxford

Annette Marianne Volfing FBA (born 5 February 1965) is a Danish-British scholar of medieval German literature and poet. Since 2008, she has been Professor of Medieval German Literature at the University of Oxford.

== Academic career ==
Volfing completed her undergraduate degree at St Edmund Hall, Oxford, graduating in 1985; she returned there to carry out her doctoral studies; her DPhil was awarded in 1993 for her thesis "A commentary on Der meide kranz by Heinrich von Mügeln". Her thesis was supervised by Nigel F. Palmer. She was elected to a fellowship at Oriel College, Oxford, the following year, alongside a lectureship at the University of Oxford (where she was promoted to reader in 2006 and Professor of Medieval German Literature two years later). In 2014, Volfing was elected vice-provost of Oriel College, the first woman to hold that position.

According to her university profile, Volfing is a "medievalist with particular interest in later medieval religious, mysical, philosophical or allegorical writing"; her British Academy adds that her research focuses on "mysticism; allegory; learned discourse (vernacular reception of the artes); didacticism; courtly romance; orientalism; discourses of gender and violence" in medieval German literature.

=== Media work ===
Volfing has contributed reviews of books examining medieval literature and culture to the Times Literary Supplement.

=== Honours and awards ===
In 2015, Volfing was elected a Fellow of the British Academy, the United Kingdom's national academy for the humanities and social sciences.

== Poetry ==
Alongside her academic career, Volfing has published two pamphlets of poetry: Ecliptic with Black Light Engine Room in 2016 and Learning Finnish with Paekakariki Press in 2021. Her poems have also appeared in magazines such as Magma Poetry.

== Personal life ==
Originally from Copenhagen, Volfing has lived in the United Kingdom since 1982 and obtained British citizenship in 2017.

== Publications ==
- Heinrich von Mügeln: >Der meide kranz<. Münchener Texte und Untersuchungen zur deutschen Literatur des Mittelalters 111 (Tübingen: Niemeyer, 1997).
- John the Evangelist and Medieval German Writing: Imitating the Inimitable (Oxford: Oxford University Press, 2001).
- Medieval Literacy and Textuality in Middle High German. Reading and Writing in Albrecht’s Jüngerer Titurel (New York: Palgrave Macmillan, 2007).
- (Co-editor with Burhhard Hasebrink, Hans-Jochen Schiewer and Almut Suerbaum) Innenräume in der Literatur des deutschen Mittelalters. XIX. Anglo-German Colloquium Oxford 2005 (Tübingen: Niemeyer, 2008).
- (Co-editor with Sarah Bowden) Punishment and Penitential Practices in Medieval German Writing, King's College London Medieval Studies (Woodbridge: Boydell and Brewer, 2018).
