= Annette O'Connor =

Canadian professor of nursing

Annette O'Connor OC FRSC FCAHS
- Born: 1950

Academic background
- Education: University of Ottawa; University of Toronto
- Thesis: Eliciting Preferences for Alternative Drug Therapies in Oncology (1986)

Academic work
- Discipline: Nursing
- Institutions: University of Ottawa

Annette Marie Cormier O'Connor (born 1950) is a Canadian academic who is a distinguished professor and professor emerita at the School of Nursing at the University of Ottawa and a fellow of the Royal Society of Canada and Canadian Academy of Health Sciences. She is a Tier 1 Canada Research Chair in Healthcare Consumer Decision Support and was awarded the Order of Canada in 2018.

== Early life and education ==
O'Connor was born in 1950 as one of four sisters. O'Connor earned her Bachelor of Science in Nursing degree from the University of Ottawa and began working as a nurse before earning her Master of Science in Nursing and Doctor of Philosophy degrees at the University of Toronto.

== Career ==
In the 1990s, O'Connor focused on nurse and patient decisional conflicts. She co-wrote a chapter with Linda O'Brien-Pallas about this topic and began developing a conceptual framework to create a patient decision aid program. After meeting with government health officials, O'Connor began the Patient Decision Aids Research Group in 1995 with Peter Tugwell. Together, they began the Patient Decision Aids Research Group to research health care related solutions to arthritis, diabetes, various cancers and heart disease. In 2004–05, she was awarded the University of Ottawa Award for Excellence in Research and the John M. Eisenberg Award for Practical Application of Medical Decision Making Research by the Society for Medical Decision Making. With funding from Bell Canada, O'Connor was also named director of the Bell Patient Decision Support Laboratory in February 2004. The laboratory, in partnership with the Ottawa Hospital Foundation, was created to help train medical practitioners in decision making and assist in aiding patients. This included funding for computer workstations, online decision aids, audio and video recording equipment and meeting rooms for focus groups and interviews.

The following year, O'Connor led a Canadian Institutes of Health Research Group in Decision Support and the International Cochrane Review of Trials of Decision Aids. As a result of her work at the Ottawa Health Research Institute regarding developing decision, O'Connor was awarded the Ottawa Life Sciences Council 2006 Health Innovation Award.

In 2012, O'Connor was awarded the Career Achievement Award by the Society for Medical Decision Making and later was elected a Fellow of the Royal Society of Canada. As well, as a result of her research, O'Connor was honoured as a Tier 1 Canada Research Chair in Healthcare Consumer Decision Support.

Following her election as a Fellow of the Canadian Academy of Health Sciences, O'Connor joined the Expert Panel on Effectiveness of Health Risk Communication as part of the Council of Canadian Academies. In 2018, O'Connor was named an Officer of the Order of Canada for her research in health care.
