= LIFT (nonprofit) =

American anti-poverty organization

LIFT Communities
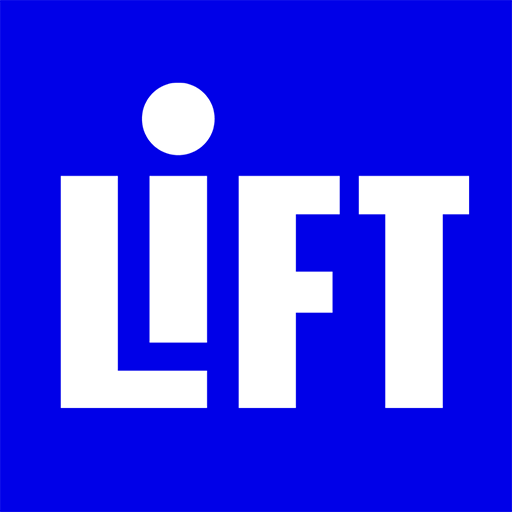
- Founder: Kirsten Lodal and Brian Kreiter
- Founded at: New Haven, Connecticut
- Type: Nonprofit organization
- Purpose: Advocacy
- Headquarters: Washington, D.C.
- Region served: Washington, D.C., Chicago, Los Angeles, New York City
- Services: Anti-poverty initiatives
- Website: liftcommunities.org
- Formerly called: National Student Partnerships (NSP)

LIFT is a nonprofit dedicated to helping families break the cycle of poverty in the United States. By fostering relationships between low-income parents (members) and dedicated volunteers (advocates), LIFT helps families build the strong personal, social and financial foundations to secure immediate, critical needs and to achieve long-term goals and aspirations.

LIFT connects with families through four sites located in communities with some of the highest rates of concentrated poverty: Chicago, Los Angeles, New York and Washington, DC. Because this work cannot be done alone, LIFT focuses on building strong community collaborations with a wide range of local, regional and national partners to help ensure families receive the resources and support they need. Since LIFT's founding, over 12,000 volunteers have served nearly 100,000 individuals and families.

== History ==
LIFT, then known as National Student Partnerships (NSP), was founded in the fall of 1998 by then Yale University students Kirsten Lodal and Brian Krieter. Lodal and Kreiter originally conceived the idea to start LIFT after volunteering in various child services programs around New Haven, Connecticut. They were struck by the lack of services for the parents of the children in these programs. Lodal and Kreiter developed the idea of establishing a single center within their community where families could receive assistance from trained volunteers across a spectrum of social services. Initially, these services included finding employment, securing housing, obtaining public benefits, and making connections with other service agencies.

In their effort, Lodal and Kreiter consulted with community members and leaders from New Haven, Connecticut as well as policy experts in Washington DC. The goal of their model was to bypass the traditional shortcomings of episodic and thin volunteer service programs. LIFT established their first center in New Haven, CT and soon recruited student leaders on college campuses across the country to build these community service centers using the LIFT model within their communities.

In 2004, Kirsten Lodal and Brian Kreiter received the Samuel S. Beard Award for Greatest Public Service by an Individual 35 Years or Under, an award given out annually by Jefferson Awards, for their work with LIFT.

In 2015, Kirsten Lodal was selected to join the prestigious 2015 class of Aspen Institute Ascend Fellows. She was chosen based on her entrepreneurial leadership and her implementation of bold ideas that change the trajectory of low-income families' lives throughout the US.

In May 2015, LIFT was chosen as one of 12 organizations to receive funding from NBC's inaugural "Red Nose Day". In August 2025, LIFT partnered with the nonprofit organization The Bronx Community Foundation to help bridge the digital literacy divide in the Bronx by offering educational courses and laptops to residents in need.
