= Annette Richardson Dinwoodey =

- circa 1925-1930

Background information
- Born: February 17, 1906; Farmington, Utah, United States
- Origin: Salt Lake City
- Died: January 21, 2007 (aged 100) Salt Lake City, Utah, United States
- Genres: Opera, choir
- Instrument: Singing
- Years active: 1926–1973

Annette Richardson Dinwoodey (February 17, 1906 – January 21, 2007) was an American radio singer and centenarian. She sang with the Mormon Tabernacle Choir from 1971 to 1973. She was a contralto.

== Biography ==
She was born in Farmington, Utah to Alamanda Bradford Richardson (1847–1921) and Linnie Gregory (1874–1955). Her father was a Presbyterian minister and her mother was one of the first to be baptized a member of the LDS Church in northeastern Texas.

Annette married Clinton Mills Dinwoodey (1901–1997) on 21 December 1928 and had two children, Anna Lou Dinwoodey Jenkins (1930–2004) and James Clinton Dinwoodey (1936–1994), both of whom are deceased.

Annette was a vocalist in the Church of Jesus Christ of Latter-day Saints, and sang at Carnegie Hall and the Salt Lake Tabernacle. She performed for a large portion of her adult life. She sang on radio station KSL from 1930 to 1945.

Dinwoodey lived in Salt Lake City, Utah and died just one month shy of her 101st birthday on January 21, 2007. She was buried in Farmington City Cemetery.

== Archive ==
The photos of her singing career are archived at the University of Utah as the Annette Dinwoodey Collection. She began researching her family history at a young age, and later published a volume of books called "Our Virginia and Tennessee Paternal Ancestors: Richardson, Lee, Teel, Martin, Caffery, and Warren".
