= Litera (company) =

American legal technology software company

- Company type: Private company
- Industry: Legal Technology, Artificial Intelligence, Computer Software, IT
- Predecessor: Workshare
- Founded: 1995; 31 years ago in Chicago, Illinois
- Headquarters: Chicago, Illinois, U.S.
- Key people: Avaneesh Marwaha; (CEO)
- Number of employees: 1,050 (2025)
- Website: www.litera.com

Litera is a Legal AI legal technology software company headquartered in Chicago, Illinois, that develops and licenses software for the practice and business of law.

== Products ==
Litera develops legal AI technology software spanning document drafting, contract review, transaction management, knowledge management, and business development. Its products are integrated within Microsoft 365 and Google Workspace.

Lito is a legal AI agent built on rules-based engines and legal workflows that Litera has developed over 30 years.

Litera One is a platform that connects drafting, contract review, and analytics within Microsoft 365. It incorporates Lito, an AI agent introduced in July 2025 that executes multi-step legal workflows in response to natural-language requests.

Litera Compare is a document comparison and redlining tool available across Microsoft 365 and Google Workspace.

Kira is a contract analysis platform acquired by Litera in 2021. It uses a hybrid AI architecture to review contracts across more than 1,400 data fields.

Litera Transact is a transaction management tool that centralizes deal checklists, automates signature collection, and produces closing books.

Litera Draft is a document drafting tool embedded in Microsoft 365.

GrowthTech is a business development and client relationship management suite designed for law firms.
