= Annette Bade =

American showgirl and actress

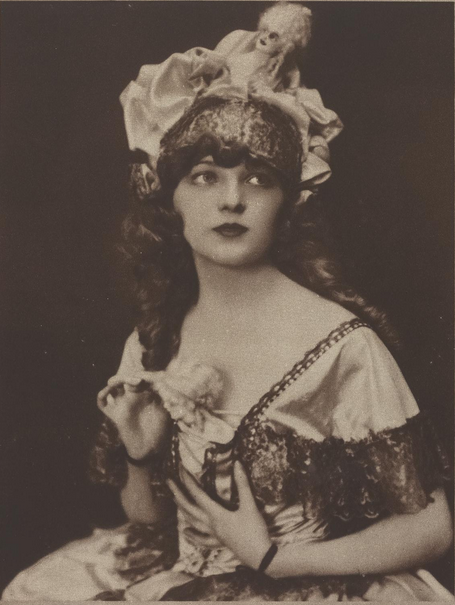
- Annette Bade, of the Ziegfeld Midnight Frolic, from a 1921 publication.
- Born: March 22, 1900; New York City, U.S.
- Died: September 2, 1975 (aged 75); Broward, Florida, U.S.
- Other names: Annette Mace; Annette Rose
- Occupations: Showgirl, actress
- Years active: 1916–1924
- Spouses: Alfred Clarence Mace Jr. (m. 1924; died 1934) Irving Rose (m. 1944)
- Children: 1

Annette Margaret Bade (March 22, 1900 – September 2, 1975) was an American stage performer, best known as a Ziegfeld girl.

== Early life ==
Annette Margaret Bade was born in New York City, the daughter of William Bade and Lillian C. Bade (née Dittman). Her parents were in show business, as were her grandparents. She left school after completing 8th grade.

== Career ==
Annette Bade was a milliner's model as a young woman. Her Broadway credits included roles in The Century Girl (1916–1917), Words and Music (1917–1918), Aphrodite (1919), Morris Gest's Midnight Whirl (1919–1920), Ziegfeld Midnight Frolic (1921), Ziegfeld 9 O'Clock Frolic (1921), Ziegfeld Frolic (1922), Cold Feet (1923), and Vogues of 1924 (1924). She was also in one silent film, A Woman's Business (1920). She appeared as a fashion model, and was one of the actress clients of British designer Lucy, Lady Duff Gordon. Critic George Jean Nathan quipped, "I venerate Molière, and Annette Bade's legs." Another critic described her as "slim, fair, youthful, and possessing a voice somewhere between a whine and a whisper."

== Personal life ==
Annette Bade married advertising executive Alfred Clarence Mace Jr. He died in 1934. Bade, who was always described as petite in stature, had a daughter, Anne Catherine Mace (1925–1980), who was over six feet tall; she also became a showgirl. Bade applied for a marriage license with Irving Rose on May 6, 1944, in Manhattan. In the 1940 census, Bade listed her occupation as saleslady.

She died on September 2, 1975, in Florida.
