= California Lawyers Association =

US bar association

- California Lawyers Association
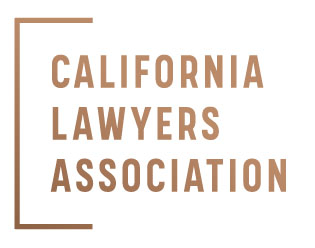
- Formation: January 1, 2018; 8 years ago
- CEO: Chris Nguyen
- President: Terrance J. Evans
- Board Chair: Jessi Fierro
- Website: www.calawyers.org

The California Lawyers Association (CLA) is a statewide, voluntary bar association for California legal professionals, headquartered in Sacramento.

CLA was established in 2018, as result of Senate Bill 36., which separated the voluntary educational, associational and advocacy activities for lawyers in the state of California from the regulation of the legal profession, resulting in the formation of CLA as an independent nonprofit organization. (Licensure, regulation and protection of the public remained housed with the State Bar of California.)

== Leadership and governance ==
CLA leadership consists of a president, a chair, and an 18-member board of representatives, with one representative per section serving a one-year term. In 2018, CLA named Ona Alston Dosunmu, formerly of the Brookings Institution, CLA's first executive director. She was eventually named chief executive officer. Dosunmu left CLA to become President and CEO of the National Association of College and University Attorneys in August 2021. In December 2021, CLA named Oyango A. Snell CEO and executive director. Snell had previously served as in-house counsel for the Western States Petroleum Association. On September 28, 2023, the association announced Snell's departure as CEO. On December 23, 2023, CLA named Chris Nguyen as its new CEO.

== Membership ==
CLA is one of the largest voluntary bar associations in the United States.

=== Sections and committees ===
As of 2022, CLA has 18 sections that act as voluntary groups of attorneys and affiliates who share an area of interest. CLA committees include Access to Justice, Civics Engagement & Education, Diversity, Equity & Inclusion, Diversity Outreach Committee, Ethics, Governmental Affairs, Health and Wellness, and Racial Justice.

=== Advocacy and initiatives ===
CLA has three initiatives called Access to Justice; Civics Engagement and Outreach; and Diversity, Equity and Inclusion. Access to Justice includes supporting legislation to increase Civil Gideon funding and other legal services to low-income Californians; Civics Engagement and Outreach prioritizes civic awareness, such as the centennial celebration of the 19th Amendment. Diversity, Equity and Inclusion focuses on several goals, including encouraging young people from under-represented backgrounds to pursue careers in the law and supporting law students and recent law school graduates in succeeding in their chosen profession. Other advocacy positions have included remote work and court depositions amid the COVD-19 pandemic, racial justice issues after the murder of George Floyd, and the California Consumer Privacy Act.

== Bar relations ==
CLA hosts the annual California Bar Leadership Conference, an annual meeting that trains and connects bar leaders from across the state. In 2019, the American Bar Association transferred to CLA five of the State Bar of California's 11 seats in the ABA House of Delegates.
