= Annette Nellen =

American lawyer and professor

- Born: United States
- Occupations: Academic, CPA, lawyer and author
- Awards: Arthur J. Dixon Memorial Award, American Institute of Certified Public Accountants (2013)

Academic background
- Education: BS Business Administration; Master of Business Administration; Juris Doctor
- Alma mater: California State University, Northridge; Pepperdine University; Loyola Law School

Academic work
- Institutions: San José State University

Annette Nellen is an American lawyer, Certified Public Accountant (CPA), author and a professor at San José State University, where she teaches undergraduate and graduate tax and accounting courses.

Her work focuses on tax policy, tax reform, and the taxation of e-commerce. She has published articles in Tax Notes State, The Tax Adviser and the Journal of Taxation of Investments, and authored books including Tax Aspects of Business Transactions: A First Course and South-Western Federal Taxation: Individual Income Taxes, as well as three additional tax textbooks in the SWFT series. She also wrote Bloomberg BNA Tax Portfolio 533, Amortization of Intangibles.

Nellen received the Arthur J. Dixon Memorial Award from the American Institute of Certified Public Accountants (AICPA) Tax Division in 2013, the Benjamin F. Miller Award from the California Lawyers Association Taxation Section in 2019, and the Sid Kess Award for Excellence in Continuing Education from the AICPA in June 2023. In June 2026, she received the Distinguished Service Award from CalCPA. She is a fellow of the American College of Tax Counsel and a research fellow at Joint Venture Silicon Valley's Institute for Regional Studies.

== Education ==
Nellen completed her Bachelor of Science degree in Business Administration with a concentration in accounting from California State University, Northridge, followed by a Master of Business Administration from Pepperdine University in 1981. Later in 1987, she obtained a J.D. from Loyola Law School. She is a licensed Certified Public Accountant (CPA) and attorney (California).

== Career ==
Nellen began her academic career in 1990 by joining San José State University where she became a professor in 1996. Additionally, she also served as the director of the university's graduate tax program (MST) from 2007 to 2026, and chaired the SJSU Academic Senate from 2003 to 2005.

Nellen has been active in the tax sections of the American Institute of Certified Public Accountants (AICPA), where she chaired the Tax Executive Committee and leads the Digital Assets Tax Task Force. In 2023, she was appointed to the IRS Advisory Council (IRSAC), and served as its chair in 2024, and was a member for 2023 through 2026. She runs the 21st Century Taxation website and blog, and is a columnist for Tax Notes State. She is a frequent speaker on tax law developments, taxation of cryptocurrency, tax developments, tax policy and tax reform.

== Research ==
Nellen's tax research focuses on tax reform, state taxation, and tax curriculum development. She was the lead author of Guiding Principles of Good Tax Policy: A Framework for Evaluating Tax Proposals, which outlines 12 principles for evaluating proposed changes . In a 2021 op-ed, she suggested three questions for Congress to consider in order to make U.S. tax system fair and simple.

In her 2012 study on internet taxation, she proposed applying standard principle of good tax policy to address the challenges of e-commerce and digital transactions. Her 2015 study recommended that entrepreneurs and tax advisors proactively monitor new tax guidance as digital economy commerce grows. In a 2020 analysis of US tax policies, she argued that poorly designed tax rules disproportionately benefit high-income earners and called for eliminating costly tax breaks to improve fairness and simplicity. She has also analyzed California's consumption taxes and recommended reforms to improve revenue generation and equity.

== Awards and honors ==
- 2000–2001 – Outstanding Professor, San José State University
- 2004–2005 – Distinguished Service Award, San José State University
- 2013 – Arthur J. Dixon Memorial Award, American Institute of Certified Public Accountants
- 2019 – Benjamin F. Miller Award, California Lawyers Association Taxation Section
- 2023 – Sid Kess Award for Excellence in Continuing Education, American Institute of Certified Public Accountants
- 2024, 2025 – Named to Accounting Today's list of the Top 100 most Influential People in Accounting
- 2026 – CalCPA Distinguished Service Award

== Bibliography ==
=== Books ===
- Tax Aspects of Business Transactions: A First Course (1998) ISBN 978-0073228785
- South-Western Federal Taxation 2022: Individual Income Taxes (2021) ISBN 9780357519073 (co-author/co-editor, plus related texts and additional years)

=== Selected articles ===
- Nellen, A. (2009). Integrating Modern World Tax Issues In the Classroom. The Tax Adviser, 40(5), 327–330.
- Nellen, A. (2012). Internet taxation and principles of good tax policy. Policy & Internet, 4(1), 1–21.
- Nellen, A. (2015). Taxation and today's digital economy. J. Tax Prac. & Proc., 17, 17.
- Nellen, A. (2018). New State and Local Tax Obligations in Cyberspace. Bus. Law., 74, 279.
- Nellen, A. (2020). Now Is the Time To Start Fixing the Sales Tax Base. Tax Notes State., 97, 987.
- Nellen, A. (2022). Form to Increase Transparency of Reconciling Information Returns. Tax Notes State., 104, 1211.
