= Annette Kaufman =

American pianist and author

Annette Kaufman (1914–2016) was an American pianist and author, who was married to violinist Louis Kaufman.

== Biography ==
Kaufman was born in Chicago in 1914 and raised in North Dakota, and was of Lithuanian Jewish descent. She studied piano from an early age and became an accomplished performer. Not yet quite an adult, she met Louis Kaufman, a violinist from Portland, Oregon, who had begun his career in vaudeville at age six. They married and lived together until Kaufman's death in 1994. Moving to Los Angeles in the early 1930s, they became part of the Hollywood musical world, Louis playing fiddle and acting as concertmaster in hundreds of classic films, from Gone with the Wind to Psycho. Shortly after World War II ended, the Kaufmans went to Europe where they stayed off and on for eight years, researching and performing the concerti of Vivaldi. After return to their home in Westwood, built-in 1935 by Lloyd Wright, they had a brief brush with the FBI, who wondered why they should have been away for so long – this was the McCarthy period. Regaining their place in the musical life of the town, they hosted string quartets and musical soirees in their living room, with Jascha Heifetz and even Charlie Chaplin playing on occasion.

At the time of his death, Louis Kaufman left a memoir, which Annette eventually finished – A Fiddler's Tale: How Hollywood and Vivaldi Discovered Me, was published in 2003. Annette continued to entertain and participate in the artistic life of Los Angeles until her death. Lifelong collectors of art, she and her husband had acquired the largest private collection extant of Milton Avery paintings, but they avoided works by Louis's boyhood friend and schoolmate Mark Rothko, which were not to their taste. On viewing one of his almost entirely black canvases, Annette once asked Mark what did it mean? 'Annette,' she would report him as saying, "I tell the rich collectors in New York that this is what you see when you pull away from the veil of the temple, and they pay me a fortune for it". As her long life drew to a close, Annette bequeathed her substantial collection of art, books, letters and other memorabilia to various libraries and art institutions. Her husband's violin solos, full of now unfashionable romantic vibrato, remain a trademark of "the Hollywood sound" of that period.
