= Annette Henninger =

German political scientist

Annette Henninger (born 1966) is a German political scientist. She is professor of politics and gender relations at the University of Marburg, Germany. Her research has focused upon antifeminism and gender in the workplace.

== Career ==
Henninger was born in Kassel, Germany, in 1966. She took her PhD in political science, focusing upon women in the Berlin labour market. She then worked at the University of Bremen and the WZB Berlin Social Science Centre. She is professor of politics and gender relations at the University of Marburg.

She edited the 2020 book Antifeminismen (Antifeminisms) with Ursula Birsl, in which they examine a rising tide of antifeminism in Germany and link it to a crisis over gender relations and racism, using different empirical studies. The same year she co-edited the volume Arbeitskonflikte sind Geschlechterkämpfe (Work disputes are gender struggles). This book assesses industrial action through the lens of gender. In 2022, she was interviewed by The Christian Science Monitor about gender relations in Germany, after Angela Merkel stepped down from the chancellor's office and Olaf Scholz became the new chancellor.

== Selected works ==
- Beck, Dorothee; Habed, Adriano José; Henninger, Annette (2023). Blurring Boundaries – 'Anti-Gender' Ideology Meets Feminist and LGBTIQ+ Discourses. Columbia University. ISBN 9783847426844.
- Artus, Ingrid; Bennewitz, Nadja; Henninger, Annette; Kerber-Clasen, Stefan; Holland, Judith (2020). Arbeitskonflikte sind Geschlechterkämpfe Sozialwissenschaftliche und historische Perspektiven (1. Auflage ed.). Münster. ISBN 978-3-89691-045-5.
- Henninger, Annette; Birsl, Ursula (2020). Antifeminismen: "Krisen"-Diskurse mit gesellschaftsspaltendem Potential?. Bielefeld. ISBN 9783837648447.
