= Annette Lucile Noble =

American novelist and travel writer (1844–1932)

- Born: July 12, 1844; Albion, New York, U.S.
- Died: November 27, 1932 (aged 88); Albion, New York, U.S.
- Occupation: Writer

Annette Lucile Noble (July 12, 1844 – November 27, 1932) was an American novelist and travel writer.

Annette Lucile Noble was born on July 12, 1844, in Albion, New York. She was the daughter of William Noble, a physician, and Amelia Stiles Denio, a descendant of Ezra Stiles. She was educated at Phipps Union Seminary in Albion. Noble was a prolific author, and her most popular work was the novel Uncle Jack’s Executors (1880). She was a frequent traveler and was said to have crossed the Atlantic Ocean forty times.

Annette Lucile Noble died on November 27, 1932, in Albion.

== Bibliography ==
- Eleanor Willoughby (1870)
- St. Augustine's Ladder (1872)
- Judge Branard's Infantry (1873)
- Under Shelter (1876)
- Out of the Way (1877)
- Queer Home in Rugby Court (1878)
- Silas Gower's Daughters (1878)
- Uncle Jack’s Executors (1880)
- Eunice Lathrop, Spinster (1881)
- Tarryport Schoolhouse (1882)
- How Billy Went Up in the World (1883)
- Miss Janet's Old House (1884)
- The Professor's Girls (1885)
- Dave Marquand (1886)
- After the Failure (1887)
- The Professor's Dilemma (1888)
- The Silent Man’s Legacy (1888)
- Summerwild (1893)
- Rachel’s Farm (1894)
- Love and Shawl-straps (1895)
- Little Pilgrims’ Pets (1896)
- Jesse: A Story in the Time of Christ (1898)
- The Crazy Angel (1901)
- Under Twelve Flags (1903)
- Easie's Miracle
- In a Country Town
- Jacob's Heiress
- Miss Robert's Lodgers in a Little Welsh Town
- The Parsonage Secret
- Ryhoves of Antwerp
- The Tarryport School Girls
- Eugene's Quest
- (with Eleanor A. Hunter), The Cosey Corner Stories
- (with Ella Beckwith Keeney) Dr. Grantley's Neighbors.
