= European Journal of Immunology =

- Discipline: Allergy. immunology
- Language: English
- Edited by: James Di Santo

Publication details
- History: 1971–present
- Publisher: Wiley-VCH (Germany)
- Frequency: Monthly
- Open access: Online Open
- Impact factor: 5.532 (2020)

Standard abbreviations
- ISO 4: Eur. J. Immunol.

Indexing
- CODEN: EJIMAF
- ISSN: 0014-2980 (print); 1521-4141 (web)
- OCLC no.: 01568458

Links
- Journal homepage; European Federation of Immunological Societies

The European Journal of Immunology is an academic journal of the European Federation of Immunological Societies covering basic immunology research, with a primary focus on antigen processing, cellular immune response, immunity to infection, immunomodulation, leukocyte signalling, clinical immunology, innate immunity, molecular immunology, and related new technology.

The editor-in-chief is James Di Santo. According to the Journal Citation Reports, the journal had a 2020 impact factor of 5.532.

Professionals in the fields of immunology, biochemistry, infection, oncology, hematology, cell biology, rheumatology, endocrinology and molecular biology make up the journal's readership.
