= Annette Corcoran =

American artist

Annette Corcoran (born 1930) is an American artist who was born in Inglewood, California. She earned a B.A. from the University of California, Berkeley in 1952, and continued post-graduate studies at California State University, Long Beach, California Polytechnic State University, Saddleback College, and the College of Marin.

She worked as a graphic artist for 15 years before turning to ceramics. She then spent 25 years making ceramic teapots. Although originally functional, they evolved into non-functional works of art.

Anhinga, in the collection of the Honolulu Museum of Art, is typical of her teapots, which usually incorporate birds into the design. It is made of hand-built porcelain, employing both underglazes and overglazes. The Everson Museum of Art (Syracuse, New York), the Honolulu Museum of Art, the Los Angeles County Museum of Art, and the National Museum of Ceramic Art (Baltimore, Maryland), the Philadelphia Museum of Art, and the Racine Art Museum (Racine, Wisconsin) are among the public collections holding work by Annette Corcoran.

== Sources ==
- Corcoran, Annette, Annette Corcoran, Birds and Teapots, 1987 - 1996, Dorothy Weiss Gallery, 1996
