= Annette Barbier =

American artist and educator (1950–2017)

Annette Louise Barbier (September 29, 1950 – June 5, 2017) was an American artist and educator. She worked with video art, net art, installation art, interactive performance, and emerging and experimental technologies since the 1970s. Themes in her work address "issues of home, defined locally as domesticity and more broadly as the ways in which we relate to our environment." An early work, "Home Invasion [1995]," incorporating critical dialogue and audio, is accessible from Leonardo. "Domestic space—formerly inviolable—is increasingly disrupted by electronic communication of all sorts, including radio, TV, email and the telephone." She was Chicago-based.

== Early life and education ==
Barbier was born and grew up in Hegewisch in Chicago. She graduated from Francis de Sales High School. Barbier attended the University of Illinois at Chicago and received her bachelor's degree in 1974 in Plastic and Graphic Art. In 1977, she received a MFA degree from the School of the Art Institute of Chicago (SAIC).

== Career ==
Driven by life experiences, Barbier's perspective on home evolved over the years. At one point Barbier dropped out of college to spend a year in France, which was formative in making issues of home, culture and identity central to her work. Years later, a Fulbright lectureship in India with her 3-year-old daughter confirmed the importance of travel in questioning one's conceptions about the world. Barbier once lived outside the city with her family on the edge of a Cook County forest preserve. This close connection to the natural environment, frequently spotting coyote, hawks, waterfowl, songbirds, and deer, made a lasting impression. Over time her focus has moved from an emphasis on the personal to a consideration of the global, looking at ways in which the home has come to be defined more broadly as populations shift, and as our interdependence becomes increasingly clear.

In her late work, Barbier re-investigated the ways in which embodiment can facilitate the expression of an idea, calling into question our relationship to the natural world using technology as a metaphor for loss. Loss of material through the destructive process of laser engraving, which removes material through burning, is compared to loss of habitat, loss of entire species, and loss of diversity in our native plants and animals. Barbier's artwork addressing ideas of home and place, in contrast to natural worlds and systems, "poetically makes visible a small intersection in civilization that is incredibly complex, and broken" and emphasizes "vision as metaphor."

=== Teaching ===
Barbier joined the faculty as an associate professor at Northwestern University in the Department of Radio/TV/Film in 1982, where she stayed until 2005. In 2005, she joined Columbia College Chicago in the Department of Interactive Arts and Media, where she remained until 2012 and left as a professor emeritus.

== Art collaborations ==
In addition to her individual practice Annette Barbier has worked collaboratively through unreal-estates, her long-term collaboration with her partner Drew Browning. Working on several project since the 1970s, unreal-estates continues to probe the potential that new technologies make available, believing that original content arises from a dialogue between an artist and a medium. In addition, this dialogue need not need not be solely between the "Artist" and the medium; authorship can be extended to the viewer, making her a participant, through instruments like microphones and video cameras, and more recently computers, biofeedback devices, DNA scans, etc. Barbier and Browning have collaborated on many projects including performances, installations, and their daughter, Celine. They have also worked on projects investigating disability and public space.

In 2012 unreal-estates and V1b3 (Video in the Built Environment) received a joint grant from Propeller Fund to create a platform for a series of augmented reality (AR) public works. Cutting edge at the time, as one of the first artistic uses of augmented reality, Expose Intervene Occupy was the result, consisting in a range of artist projects that used augmented reality technology to engage critically with the Chicago public. unreal-estates has lectured and exhibited nationally and internationally, sharing both "the joys and sorrows of working with cutting edge technologies." An interview with unreal-estates was published in Media-N, Journal of the New Media Caucus [Fall 2010: v.06 n.02 Dynamic Coupling]

== Select art exhibitions ==
2018

- Chicago New Media 1973–1992, Gallery 400, Chicago, IL, 10/1/19 - 12/15/19

2014

- Solo show, Chicago Artists Coalition, August, 2014
- Group show "Avian Spirits", Brushwood Center, Ryerson Woods Conservation Area, Lake Co., IL, 7- 9/2014
- Group show "Extinctions", Brushwood Center, Ryerson Woods Conservation Area, Lake Co., IL, 3- 4/2014
- Retrospective, Fountains Foundation 916, 2 – 3/2014;
- Preview, show of BOLT residents at the Chicago Artists Coalition Gallery, 2/7 – 27.

2013

- Transgressions, solo show at Brushwood Center, Ryerson Woods Conservation Area, Lake Co., IL, 11/9 /13 – 1/16/14

2012

- Approach, Video Guerilla Tour 2012, São Paulo, Brazil, 11/12
- Expose, Intervene, Occupy (EIO) documentary at International Symposium of Electronic Art (ISEA), Albuquerque, AZ, 9/12
- Winds of Change, New Media Festival L.A., Los Angeles Center for Digital Art, Los Angeles, CA, 7/12 – 8/4/12
- EIO at the University Film and Video Assn. (UFVA), Chicago, IL, 8/12
- Scan2go, invited artist in College Art Association exhibit of mobile media based work, Los Angeles, CA, 2/2012.

2011

- IDEAS exhibit at the International Digital Media Art Assn. (IDMAA) conference, Savannah, GA. Invited artist – Subtractions series; also two collaborative works with Drew Browning, Puff (interactive installation) and Winds of Change (video), juried exhibition 10/11
- Brood, with Niki Nolin, at the Project Room, Columbia College Chicago, 7/11
- V1b3 at the College Art Association, juried group show: Stages: video installation, NYC, 2/11
- Synthesis: Processing and Collaboration invited group show at Calit 2 Gallery; Speak to Me Softly: video document of interactive installation, Jan. – March, 2011
- V1b3 at the IDMAA conference, Vancouver, BC, 11/10, The American Dream, video 2010
- Gallery Aferro, Newark, NJ, Home Invasion, audio work, 2,3/10 2009
- Site Unseen (commissioned), Elevator Music, sound installation, Chicago Cultural Center, 11/09 2008
- Upgrade Network, screening of Stages and Homeland Security Advice, Skopje, Macedonia, 9/08

2007

- Polvo Gallery, Echelon, Search Terms: interactive installation; Chicago, IL, 8 – 9/07
- Web3dart 2007, Dana Centre Science and Art Museum, London, UK and University of Perugia, Umbria, Italy, 5/07, Extreme Measures

2006

- Site Unseen (commissioned), Chicago Cultural Center, Rise/Run, 11/06.

2005

- UFVA, Path of the Dragon, Homeland Security Advice, Escape, installations and video, 8/05, Chicago, IL - IDMAA conference, juried exhibition of Stigmata and Wave Harmonies, 2 interactive installations, Orlando, FL, 3/05

2004

- Performance of River of Many Sides, commissioned by Art Synergy, collaboration with US and Vietnamese artists, 6/04, UIC theater, Chicago, Il
- IDMAA conference, juried exhibition of Extreme Measures, a web work, Orlando, FL, 3/04

2003

- Commission for Waiting in Line, an interactive installation at the Museum of Science and Industry, 8/ 14-18/2003

2002

- "Home Works"- Betty Rymer Gallery, School of the Art Institute of Chicago; 12/02 _ 2/03; exhibition of HOME at the SAIC Alumni show.
- V.02, Museum of Contemporary Art, Chicago April 18/19/02; exhibition of HOME in conference/exhibit on art and technology

2001

- "Contact Zones", Nickle Art Museum, Calgary, Alberta, Canada, 10-12/01. Home CDROM.
- Ars Electronica Conference and Exhibition, 9/2001, Linz, Austria; Home, a virtual reality environment for the CAVE

2000

- Inter Society for Electronic Arts (ISEA), Home, Paris, France, 12/2000; -FILE, Home, Museum of Image and Sound, São Paulo, Brazil, 8-9/00

1998

- Women in the Director's Chair, Patio Lights and 3 Minute Life, 3/98, Chicago, IL

1997

- Included in "Electronic Immersions: 4 Generations of Illinois Artists" at the State of Illinois Gallery, 9-10/97, in connection with the ISEA conference in Chicago.
- Website, The Home Page, was featured in "Women and the Art of Multimedia" at the National Museum of Women in the Arts, 4-5/97.

1996

- IV Congresso da Associacao Internacional da Semiotica Visual; "Video Narratives" 11-12/96

1995

- Image Union (Ch. 11, WTTW, Chicago, IL) screening of Longing, 4/20/95 and Domestic Portraits, Moving to the Suburbs, 11/94
- Fourth National Poetry Video Festival, April 5–7, 1995 Video Festival, Dallas, TX,

1994

- Chicago Filmmakers invited screening, 3/4/94
- James River Festival of the Moving Image, Virginia Commonwealth University, Longing, 4/15-17/94

1993

- Mill Valley Film Festival, Mill Valley, CA, The Kitchen Goddess, 11/93 -Dallas Video Festival, Dallas, TX, The Kitchen Goddess, 11/93

1992

- Intimate Technologies/Fictional Personas, St. Lawrence University, Canton, NY, Table of Silence, 3/92

1990

- My Country 'Tis of Thee (show named after the videotape), American Museum of the Moving Image, Astoria, NY, 1/13-19/90
- In Search of Paradise, Artists Space, NYC, and L.A.C.E., LA, Women'sMovements, 1/18-2/24/1990 -Twelfth Annual San Francisco Art Institute Film and Video Festival, Women's Movements, 4/20-22, 1990
- imMEDIAte family, Newhouse Center for Contemporary Art, Snug Harbor Cultural Center, Staten Island, NY, Table of Silence, 4/28–9/2/1990.(Subsequently toured with these tapes on NY cablestations). *The Houston International Film Festival, Women's Movements, Silver Award Certificate, 4/90
- UFVA, formal screening, Women's Movements, June, 1990, formal respondent John Caldwell (review published in Journal of South Asian Cinema).
- Downtown Community TV screening series, NYC, Women's Movements, 8/28/90

1989

- This Is Who I Am, Table of Silence, 911, Contemporary Arts Center, Seattle, WA, 11/89

1988

- It's About Time, The Independents on the Learning Channel, 4/88, Table of Silence -Women in the Director's Chair, Table of Silence, Chicago, 3/88

1987

- Channel 11, WTTW, Public Television, Image Union, Chicago, 2/87 -San Paolo Video Festival, Brazil, 9/87

1986

- Lifestories, Minneapolis College of Art and Design Gallery, 10-11/86
- American Film Institute National Video Festival, Los Angeles, CA, 12/86
- "Video and Language, Video as Language", L.A.C.E., Los Angeles, 12/86 and the Bergman Gallery,
- Renaissance Society, University of Chicago, 3/87

1985

- Athens Video Fest, Athens, OH, 11/85
- First International Video Biennale, Vienna, Austria, 9/85
- Video-Biennale Internationale, Josefsplatz, Germany, 4/85
- European tour (Wales, Paris) of Chase Scene, a video/computer graphics performance,1985, which premiered at Dancespace, St. Marks's Church, NYC,10/84. Contributing artist. -"Chicago", survey of work by Chicago artists, Banff Centre, Banff, Alberta, CA, 2-3/85

1984

- Great Lakes Video and Film Festival, Milwaukee, WI, 10/84
- One person exhibit, installations and tapes, the Center for New Television, Chicago, IL, 9/84 -Alternative Space, Museum of Contemporary Art, Chicago, 7/84

1983

- Image Union, Ch. 11, WTTW, "Dance in Silence", 10/83 and 10/82

1982

- Women Directors A to Z, Center for New TV, Chicago Filmmakers, ARC Gallery, 12/12/82

1981

- "Expression", production of Television Francaise 1, originating in Paris and broadcast internationally, 12/81
- 3rd Erlangen Video Festival, Erlangen, Germany, 5/81
- Video at Anthology Film Archives, NYC, 4/81
- Neuro-Electronic Exoperimenters, The Center for Media Art, American Center in Paris, France, 4/81
- So To Speak, a video/dance performance, MoMing Dance and Arts Center, Chicago, IL, 3/81 and the University of Illinois, Chicago, 1/82

1979

- Video Roma II, Rome, Italy, 9/79

1978

- Image Union, WTTW, Chicago, Beach Ball Boogie, 11/78 1975
- Chicago and Vicinity Show, (sculpture), Art Institute of Chicago, 1/75

== Select permanent collections ==
- The Rose Goldsen Archive of New Media Art, Cornell University Library
- Ars Electronica Center, Linz, Austria
- State of Illinois Gallery, State of Illinois Building, Chicago, Illinois
- Art Institute of Chicago, Video Data Bank, Chicago, Illinois
- U.S. Consular Library, Madras, India
- Film and Television Institute of India, Pune, India

== Awards ==
- Artist's Residency, BOLT, Chicago Artists Coalition, 2013–14
- Artist's Residency, Prairie Center of the Arts, Peoria, IL, 4/12 for Homeland Security Advice, Jury Award, UFVA, 8/05
- for Stigmata, Best in Show, International Digital Media Arts Assn., 3/05
- for Wave Harmonies, Jury Award, International Digital Media Arts Assn., 3/05
- for Home, Second Place, FILE web art, 9/00
- for Domestic Portraits 1 & 2, Honorable Mention, 19th Festival of Illinois Film and Video Artists, 4/94
- for Longing, Gold Award, Houston Worldfest, 5/94
- for Women's Movements, Silver Award, The Houston International Film Festival, 4/90
- for Women's Movements, independent video category, Chicago International Film Festival, Silver Plaque, 11/89
- for Table of Silence, Silver Plaque and Silver Hugo, Chicago International Film Festival, 11/87
- for Inside, Gold Plaque, Chicago International Film Festival, Independent Video category, 11/84
- Artist's Residency, Experimental Television Center, Owego, NY, 8/83
- for Eye See the World so Beautifully, Silver Plaque, Chicago International Film Fest., '79

== Reviews ==
- Essay for Fountains retrospective, by Celine Browning
- "A Room To View", Melissa Potter, Media-N, Journal of the New Media Caucus, Fall 2011: V.07 N.02
- "There's No Place Like Home: The Paradox of Embodiment in the work of Annette Barbier", review by Jennifer Machiorlatti, After Image, fall '06, Vol. 34, #3
- artnet.com, review by Victor M. Cassidy of "Path of the Dragon", in InTransit exhibition, Gosia Koscielak Gallery, 6/06
- River of Many Sides, review by Kathryn Farley in The Artletter: www.artletter.com, 7/04 - Home cited in: Fischnaller, Franz. " E-Art ... Net ... Society", Editori Riuniti, Rome, Italy, June, 2004
- Paul Hertz, in Leonardo: The Journal of the International Society for the Arts, Sciences and Technology, Vol. 30, No. 4, 1997, MIT Press.
- Caldwell, John, Journal of South Asian Cinema, 5/91
- Kleinhans, Chuck, "Visual Narratives: New Chicago Video," New Art Examiner,5/87
- Straayer, Chris, "Women in the Director's Chair", Afterimage, Vol. 14, #10, 5/87 -Bayard, Louis, "Reel life: A festival of females' films and videos", The Reader, 3/6/87
- Hixson, Kathryn, "Video News: back to the story", The Reader, Feb. 13, 1987
- Rankin, Scott, "Video and Language, Video as Language," Catalog for the exhibition at Los Angeles Contemporary Exhibition Center, 12/4/86 - 1/18/87
- Smith, Amanda, "The Body and the Box", The Village Voice, 10/20/84

== Publications ==
- Bukalski, Peter J., and Annette Barbier. "University Film and Video Association guidelines for M.F.A. programs." Journal of Film and Video 52.1 (2000): 33-47.
- Kuiper, John B., et al. "Presidents forum: What should UFVA bring forward from the past to the future?" Journal of Film and Video 49.3 (1997): 73-84.
- Hardin, Ted. 3 Minute Life and Patio Lights. 50 Vol. Englewood: University Film and Video Association, 1998.
- Hardin, Ted. Video Reviews: "3 Minute Life" and "Piano Lights". 50 Vol. Chicago, Ill: University Film and Video Association, 1998.
- Barbier, Annette. Video Reviews: "In the Desert: A Webwork" Directed by Edmond Chibeau. 49 Vol. Chicago, Ill: University Film and Video Association, 1997.
- Barbier, Annette. In the Desert: A Webwork. 49 Vol. Englewood: University Film and Video Association, 1997.
- Barbier, Annette. "Video Reviews -- Dykeotomy Directed by Deborah Fort." Journal of Film and Video 45.2-3 (1993): 111
- Barbier, Annette. dykeotomy. 45 Vol. Englewood: University Film and Video Association, 1993.
