= Anette Grecchi Gray =

Anette Grecchi Gray is a chef, most recently the Chef de Cuisine of Jiko in Florida.

Gray was born in Lucerne, Switzerland. She learned her cooking skills as an apprentice at the Hotel de la Balance in Les Breuleux, Switzerland.

She joined the Walt Disney Company in 1992 as Chef de Cuisine at the Inventions Restaurant in the Disneyland Hotel at the Disneyland Resort Paris.

She is a member of American Women Chefs and Restaurateurs. In 1996, she was voted Chef of the Year by the Orlando Restaurant Forum.

She left her position at Jiko in 2007, to take a position with Carlson Cos., owner of T.G.I.Friday's and other brands. There has been no official word on who will replace her.
