= Annette Watts =

American basketball player and coach

Current position
- Title: Women's head coach
- Team: Greeneville (TN) High School

Biographical details
- Born: February 5, 1959 (age 67)

Playing career
- 1978–81: East Tennessee State University

Coaching career (HC unless noted)
- 1985–92: Greeneville (TN) HS (asst.)
- 1992–97: R.W.Johnson CHS (Gainesville, GA)
- 1997–99: N.C.State (asst.)
- 1999–2001: Jackson County CHS (Jefferson, GA)
- 2001–10: Davidson College
- 2010–2013: Jacksonville State University
- 2013–Present: Greeneville (TN) High School

Annette Watts, née Culberson (born February 5, 1959), is an American high school basketball coach and the current head coach at Greeneville High School. She was formerly a college basketball coach and the former women's head coach at Jacksonville State University in Jacksonville, Alabama. The JSU Gamecocks are members of the Ohio Valley Conference and compete in the NCAA's Division I.

== Biography ==
The daughter of George and Geraldine Culberson, Annette is a native of Greene County, Tennessee and a 1977 graduate of West Greene High School. Attending East Tennessee State University on a basketball scholarship, she helped ETSU to a 54–54 record in her four years of playing guard for the Lady Bucs. She graduated from ETSU in 1981 with a Bachelor of Science degree, then continued in graduate school there, earning her master's degree in Secondary Math Education in 1985. She married Mike Watts, a professional race car driver. Anette now works at Greeneville High School teaching math.

== Coaching career ==
After graduating from ETSU, Annette began her coaching career at Greeneville (Tenn.) High school where she earned local Coach of the Year honors, taught for eight years, and directed the Lady Devils YMCA Basketball Camp for seven years. Relocating to Gainesville, Georgia, she taught and coached at Robert Wood Johnson Comprehensive High School, compiling a 125–51 in five seasons, being named local Coach of the Year three times, and also serving as director of the Lady Knight Basketball Camp from 1990 through 1995. Moving into the college coaching ranks for the first time, Annette spent 1997–99 as an assistant to Hall of Fame coach Kay Yow at North Carolina State University. Annette then spent two seasons as head coach at Jackson County Comprehensive High School in Jefferson, Georgia, where she guided the Lady Panthers to the 2001 state quarterfinals and compiled an overall record of 38–20 and once more was named the local Coach of the Year. In 2001, Annette was named the head coach at Davidson College, where she became the winningest coach in that program's history. Her Davidson teams were 144–121 overall, 102–68 in the Southern Conference, and Annette was named the 2005 SoCon Coach of the Year. After nine seasons, Annette resigned at Davidson and, on May 20, 2010, was named the head coach at Jacksonville State University. On June 4, 2013 it was announced that Annette has been named Head Girls Basketball Coach at Greeneville High School.

== Head coaching record ==
Record table
Season	Team	Overall	Conference	Standing	Postseason
1992–97	R.W.Johnson CHS	125–51	N/A	N/A	N/A
1999–2001	Jackson County CHS	38–20	N/A	N/A	N/A
HS Total:		163–71	N/A		
Davidson College (Southern Conference) (2001–2010)
2001–02	Davidson	10–18	6–12	8th	0–1 (SoCon)
2002–03	Davidson	15–15	8–10	6th tie	2–1 (SoCon)
2003–04	Davidson	16–12	13–7	3rd tie	0–1 (SoCon)
2004–05	Davidson	18–11	14–6	2nd	1–1 (SoCon)
2005–06	Davidson	17–12	12–6 2nd tie	2nd tie	1–1 (SoCon)
2006–07	Davidson	23–9	13–5	2nd tie	1–1 (SoCon), 0–1 (WNIT)
2007–08	Davidson	19–11	13–5	3rd tie	0–1 (SoCon)
2008–09	Davidson	12–18	11–9	4th tie	0–1 (SoCon)
2009–10	Davidson	14–15	12–8	6th	0–1 (SoCon)
Davidson:		144–121	102–68		
Jacksonville State (Ohio Valley Conference) (2010–2013)
2010–11	JSU	10–21	6–12	6th	1–1 (OVC)
2011–12	JSU	4–25	6–12	9th	
2012–13	JSU	1–27	1–15	6th East	
JSU:		20–68	13–39		
Total:		327–260			
National champion Postseason invitational champion Conference regular season champion Conference regular season and conference tournament champion Division regular season champion Division regular season and conference tournament champion Conference tournament champion
