= Anniken Paulsen =

Norwegian contemporary composer and pianist

Anniken Paulsen (born 28 April 1955 in Greåker) is a Norwegian contemporary composer and pianist.

== Career ==
Paulsen studied piano with Reimar Riefling and at the Østlandets Musikkonservatorium (today the Norwegian Academy of Music), specializing as a soloist. Her debut as a pianist came in 1980 with a full-night concert featuring works by Franz Liszt, Arnold Schoenberg, Robert Schumann, Anton Webern, and Maurice Ravel. Later, Paulsen studied composition at the Norwegian Academy of Music.

== Production ==
=== Selected works ===
- Korinter 13 : For organ, choir and percussion (2016)
- 2014 Overture (2014)
- Four Reasons : For string quartet & soprano (2014)
- Circle of Life (2011)
- RissKiss (2007)
- Tidspunktet (2000)
- Credo eros (1999)
- Arctic Light (1997)
- A Bit of Kilimanjaro : Quartet for Saxophones (1992)

=== Discography ===
- Arctic Brass, Burning Ice (2001)
