= Annette Eddie-Callagain =

American lawyer

- Born: February 11, 1953 (age 73); New Iberia, Louisiana, U.S.
- Education: Southern University; Southern University Law Center
- Occupation: Attorney
- Known for: International family law

Annette M. Eddie-Callagain (born February 11, 1953) is the first African American attorney to practice law in Japan. She is a practitioner of international family law, notable for child support and child custody cases involving American servicemen and Japanese women.

She was in the United States Air Force and served in the Judge Advocate Generals' Corps on active duty from 1983 to 1995 and the reserves from 1995 to 2006, when she retired as a major. While in the air force reserves, she opened her private practice in Okinawa, Japan. In the United States, there is a system for compulsory child support payments, but mothers in Japan lacked a similar system. In 1999, she began contacting child support enforcement agencies in each state, became a member of the National Child Support Enforcement Association (NCSEA), and coordinated a method of claiming child support from Okinawa. Until around 2005, it was said that she performed the requests for child support for free. In 2007, she was inducted into the Southern University Law Center Hall of Fame. As of 2020, she is a part-time lecturer at the Ryukyu University Law School.
