= Annette Byrne =

Irish physiologist and researcher

Annette Therese Byrne
- Education: University of York (PhD); University College Cork (BSc)
- Scientific career
- Workplaces: Royal College of Surgeons in Ireland; University College Dublin; UCSF School of Medicine
- Thesis: Analysis of apoptosis in the preimplantation mammalian embryo (1999)
- Website: Precision Cancer Medicine

Annette Therese Byrne is an Irish physiologist, Professor and Head of the Royal College of Surgeons in Ireland (RCSI) Precision Cancer Medicine group. Her research considers metastatic colorectal cancer and glioblastoma.

== Early life and education ==
Byrne started her scientific career at University College Cork, where she earned a bachelor's degree in physiology. For her graduate studies, Byrne joined the University of York, where she studied the role of apoptosis during preimplantation development in mammals. After earning her doctorate, Byrne was awarded a fellowship to in gynecologic oncology at the UCSF School of Medicine. Here she investigated the angiogenesis targets that are important in the progression of ovarian cancer. After completing her fellowship, Byrne joined Pharmacyclics Inc, an AbbVie pharmaceutical company in Silicon Valley. At Pharmacyclics Byrne studied chemotherapy sensitiser drugs.

== Research and career ==
Byrne left San Francisco for New York in 2003, where she joined Angion Biomedica. Here she worked on therapeutic strategies that made use of angiogenesis pathways. She returned to Ireland in 2005, when she was appointed Senior Scientist at the University College Dublin. At the Conway Institute Byrne worked to establish the Tumour Xenograft Facility and translational Pre-clinical Imaging Centre.

In 2008 Byrne moved to the Royal College of Surgeons in Ireland. In 2011 she founded the Framework Programmes for Research and Technological Development (FP7) funded project Angiopredict. Angiopredict looked to offer personalised medicine for people with metastatic colorectal cancer. Colorectal cancer is the third most common cancer in Europe. The project looked to identify the biomarkers that could predict a patient's response to bevacizumab, a drug used to treat colorectal cancer patients who do not respond to anti-EGFR therapies. Bevacizumab (also known as Avastin) is delivered in combination with chemotherapy, but is not always effective and can result in side effects. Once the biomarkers were identified, she created a series of diagnostic tests that could predict how patients would respond to bevacizumab.

Byrne launched the COLUSSUS programme in 2018, a Horizon 2020 project that looked at microsatellite stable (MSS) RAS mutant metastatic colorectal cancer (MSS RAS mt mCRC). COLOSSUS uses multiomics to identify new subtypes of MSS RAS mt mCRC and to develop personalised treatment protocols. She simultaneously leads the Marie Skłodowska-Curie Actions (MSCA) GLIOblastoma TRAINing (GLIO TRAIN) Innovative Training Network, which trains scientists in brain tumour research, cancer systems medicine and multi-omics. Glioblastoma is the most aggressive and lethal of all brain tumours, with 85% of patients dying within two years of diagnosis. In 2020 she launched the Science Foundation Ireland National Preclinical Imaging Centre that developed new diagnostic tools and medical therapies for cancer, neurology and psychiatry.

In 2024, she was made a member of the Royal Irish Academy.

== Select publications ==
- O’Connor, Aisling E.; Gallagher, William M.; Byrne, Annette T. (2009). "Porphyrin and Nonporphyrin Photosensitizers in Oncology: Preclinical and Clinical Advances in Photodynamic Therapy". Photochemistry and Photobiology. 85 (5): 1053–1074. doi:10.1111/j.1751-1097.2009.00585.x. ISSN 1751-1097. PMID 19682322. S2CID 205950773.
- Byrne, Annette T.; Alférez, Denis G.; Amant, Frédéric; Annibali, Daniela; Arribas, Joaquín; Biankin, Andrew V.; Bruna, Alejandra; Budinská, Eva; Caldas, Carlos; Chang, David K.; Clarke, Robert B. (2017). "Interrogating open issues in cancer precision medicine with patient-derived xenografts". Nature Reviews Cancer. 17 (4): 254–268. doi:10.1038/nrc.2016.140. hdl:2445/123494. ISSN 1474-1768. PMID 28104906. S2CID 165804.
- Byrne, Annette T.; Ross, Leorah; Holash, Joceyln; Nakanishi, Mikiye; Hu, Limin; Hofmann, Judith I.; Yancopoulos, George D.; Jaffe, Robert B. (15 November 2003). "Vascular Endothelial Growth Factor-Trap Decreases Tumor Burden, Inhibits Ascites, and Causes Dramatic Vascular Remodeling in an Ovarian Cancer Model". Clinical Cancer Research. 9 (15): 5721–5728. ISSN 1078-0432. PMID 14654557.
