= Annette Jones (architect) =

New Zealand architect and urban designer

- Born: Annette Pauline Jones
- Education: University of Auckland
- Occupation: Architect

Annette Pauline Jones is a New Zealand architect and urban designer with over 30 years experience at engineering firm Beca Group where she works on town planning.

== Biography ==
Jones attended St Cuthbert's College in Auckland, completing her studies there in 1983. Jones is of the Māori nation (iwi) Ngāpuhi of Northland, New Zealand.

Shortly after graduating, she joined the Auckland office of Beca, a multidisciplinary consultancy practice. She has worked on educational buildings and the development of masterplans, including in Micronesia. In 2004, she completed a master's degree in urban design at the University of Auckland and began to work in that field. Jones has provided urban design advice on large infrastructure projects, town centre developments, revitalisation and streetscape projects, and residential and education facilities. Jones is a registered architect in New Zealand.

Jones was a founding member of the Manukau City Council Urban Design Panel (now part of the Auckland Council Urban Design Panel).

=== Awards and recognition ===
Jones has received the New Zealand Institute of Building's ‘Building Excellence Award’.
