= Annette Daniels =

American opera singer

- Daniels in 1990

Background information
- Born: September 10, 1961; Wichita, Kansas
- Died: April 1, 2004 (aged 42) Houston, Texas
- Genres: Opera singer

Annette Daniels (September 10, 1961 – April 1, 2004) was an American mezzo-soprano opera singer.

== Career ==
Daniels appeared with a variety of opera companies in the United States including Houston, Washington, D.C., Dallas, San Diego, Cincinnati, and Portland. She also performed numerous oratorios as well as concert works with orchestras. One of her notable roles was Betty in the first production of Monticello. A recording of the performance was broadcast on National Public Radio and released on an audio CD.

== Personal life ==
Daniels was born and raised in Wichita, Kansas. She graduated from Wichita State University with a B.A. in Voice Performance and French and a Masters of Fine Arts from the University of Michigan in 1985. Daniels died of cancer at age 42 in Houston in 2004.
