= Annette Hamilton =

Australian cultural anthropologist

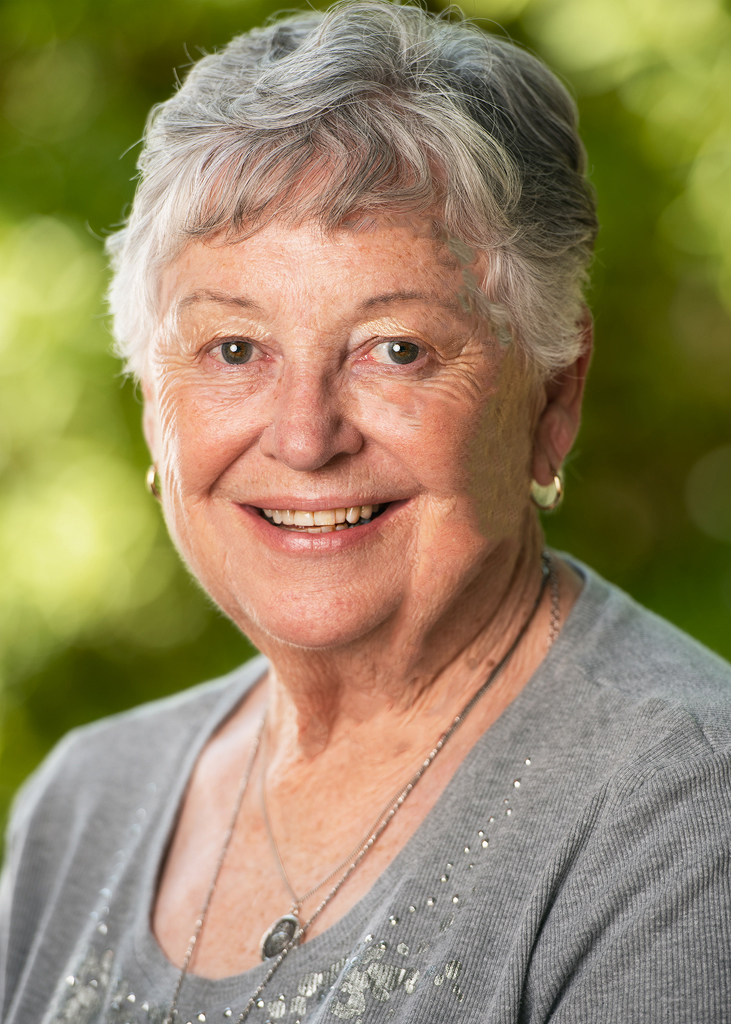
- Annette Hamilton January 2019
- Born: 1945 (age 80–81); Sydney
- Education: University of Sydney
- Occupations: Anthropologist & Writer
- Years active: 1970-2019
- Known for: cultural anthropologist for remote Aboriginal Australia, anthropology of media in South-East Asia
- Website: annette-hamilton.com

Annette Hamilton (born 1945) is a leading Australian born and based cultural anthropologist and senior fellow of the Australian Anthropological Society who first undertook significant fieldwork, appeared as an expert in land rights claims, and published on Aboriginal Australian peoples of the Northern Territory plus remote South Australia (within the Aṉangu Pitjantjatjara Yankunytjatjara Lands), later specializing and becoming a key practitioner lecturing and publishing on the visual anthropology of media in Southeast Asia.

== Career ==
Hamilton attended the University of Sydney where she completed her BA, MA and PhD in cultural anthropology.

Following graduation Hamilton worked in many remote Indigenous communities between 1968 and 1985 and appeared in a number of landmark Northern Territory Land Rights cases as anthropologist and expert witness. During this time she also published extensively in academic journals and was also a regular contributor to Arena Magazine (Australia).

In 1985 Hamilton's research interestes shifted and include visual anthropology of media in Southeast Asia and much of her work has been on cinema in Thailand, Vietnam, Laos and Cambodia.

From 1983 - 2001 Hamilton taught at Macquarie University and from 2002 - 2019 at the University of New South Wales.

Following her retirement from active University lifeamilton has been active in independent publishing and creative writing.

== Select publications ==
- Hamilton, Annette (1970). Socio-cultural factors in health among the Pitjantjatjara. Government Printer, South Australia
- Hamilton, Annette (1979). Timeless transformation : women, men and history in the Australian Western Desert. Sydney University
- Hamilton, Annette (1981). Nature and nurture : child rearing in North-Central Arnhem Land.
