= Workshare =

Provider of secure enterprise file sharing and collaboration applications

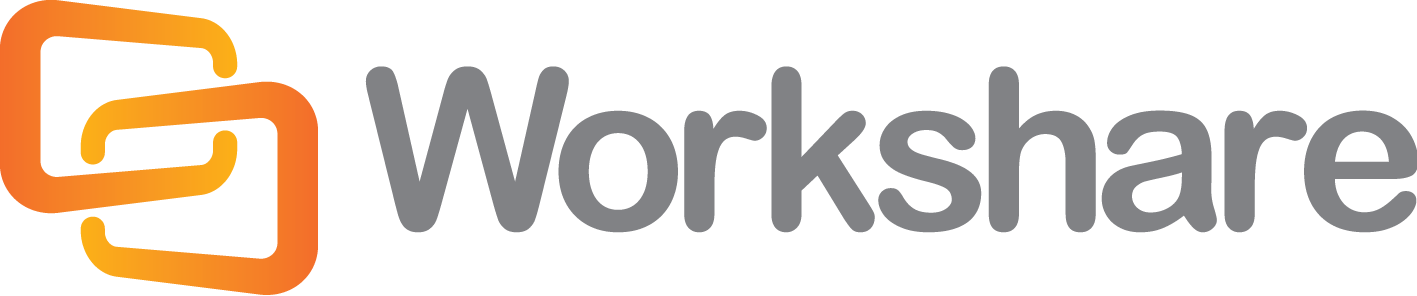
- Type: Privately held company
- Industry: Software
- Predecessor: IdeaPlane
- Founded: 1999
- Founder: Barrie Hadfield
- Defunct: 2019
- Fate: Acquired
- Successor: Litera
- Headquarters: London, United Kingdom
- Area served: Legal Services, Professional Services, Healthcare & Pharmaceutical
- Key people: Barrie Hadfield (CTO), Michael Garrett (CEO)
- Products: Workshare Compare, Workshare Secure, Workshare Transact
- Services: Document comparison, collaboration, security and deal transaction management
- Parent: Litera
- Website: www.workshare.com

Workshare was a British provider of secure enterprise file sharing and collaboration applications. It allowed content owners to track and compare changes in documents from multiple contributors simultaneously. The company has been part of US company Litra since 2019.

== History ==
In 1999, UK technology entrepreneur Barrie Hadfield co-founded Workshare as a provider of client-server document comparison software. Workshare's applications are used by legal and professional services organizations to track changes in contracts and documents.

In 2012, Workshare merged with Skydox, also founded by Barrie Hadfield, a provider of cloud-enabled document collaboration software for the enterprise sector. Scottish Equity Partners and Business Growth Fund invested £20m in the deal.

Workshare acquired IdeaPlane, an enterprise social network, in 2012.

In 2019, Workshare was acquired by its competitor, Litera.

== See also ==
- Collaborative software
- Document collaboration
- Document Management Systems
- Cloud Storage
- Cloud collaboration
- Social business
- Software as a Service
