= Joel Bleifuss =

American journalist

Joel Bleifuss is an American journalist. He was the editor and publisher of In These Times, a Chicago-based non-profit news magazine founded in 1976 by James Weinstein. During Bleifuss's tenure, the magazine published articles and columns by members of the U.S. Congressional Progressive Caucus, Arundhati Roy, and Slavoj Žižek, as well as long-time writers Susan Douglas, David Moberg, and Salim Muwakkil.

== Career ==
Before working at In These Times, Bleifuss was a features writer at the Fulton Sun, in Fulton, Missouri. His criticisms of the public relations industry have appeared in the Utne Reader and on the op-ed page of The New York Times.

Bleifuss began working as an investigative reporter and columnist for In These Times in 1986, when it was published as a tabloid newspaper. He became managing editor in 1998 and editor the following year.

Bleifuss writes frequently on U.S. politics, foreign policy, and environmental affairs. His columns have covered an array of topics including mad-cow disease (BSE) and the beef industry, carcinogens in cosmetics, and the "October Surprise" preceding the 1980 U.S. presidential elections. Bleifuss's articles have been featured on Project Censored's list of suppressed news stories more than those of any other American journalist.

During the years of the George W. Bush administration, Bleifuss published Was the 2004 Presidential Election Stolen?: Exit Polls, Election Fraud, and the Official Count.

He also worked with American novelist Kurt Vonnegut on a variety of articles, interviews, and short comic essays, which were published first in magazines and republished in La Jornada and other media outlets. A Man Without a Country, the last book Vonnegut published during his lifetime, includes material that originally appeared in In These Times.

He lives in Chicago, Illinois.
