= Woodmansee =

Woodmansee is a surname. Notable people with the surname include:

- Daniel Woodmansee (1777–1842), American politician
- Emily H. Woodmansee (1836–1906), English-born American poet and hymnwriter
- John W. Woodmansee (born 1934), American lieutenant general
- Martha Woodmansee (born 1944), American academic
- Michael Woodmansee (born 1958), American murderer
