= In These Times (magazine) =

American politically progressive monthly magazine

- Magazine cover, December 2016.
- Categories: Progressive news and opinion
- Frequency: Monthly
- Circulation: 50,000 (as of 2017)
- Publisher: Christopher Hass
- Founder: James Weinstein
- Founded: November 1976; 50 years ago
- First issue: November 1976
- Company: Institute for Public Affairs
- Country: United States
- Based in: Chicago, Illinois, U.S.
- Language: English
- Website: inthesetimes.com
- ISSN: 0160-5992
- OCLC: 60620754

In These Times is an American politically progressive monthly magazine of news and opinion published in Chicago, Illinois. It was established as a broadsheet-format fortnightly newspaper in 1976 by James Weinstein, a lifelong socialist. It investigates alleged corporate and government wrongdoing, covers international affairs, and has a cultural section. It regularly reports on labor, economic and racial justice movements, environmental issues, feminism, grassroots democracy, minority communities, and the media.

Weinstein was the publication's founding editor and publisher; its current publisher is Christopher Hass. As of 2017, it had a circulation of over 50,000. As a nonprofit organization, the magazine is financed through subscriptions and donations.

== History ==
In 1976, Weinstein, a historian and former editor of Studies on the Left, launched the politically progressive journal In These Times. He sought to model it after the early-20th-century socialist newspaper, Appeal to Reason. The initial tagline of In These Times was "The Socialist Newsweekly": "We intend to speak to corporate capitalism as the great issue of our time, and to socialism as the popular movement that will meet it", he told the Chicago Sun Times on the eve of the first issue's release. While Weinstein himself was involved with both the New American Movement and the Democratic Socialist Organizing Committee, he wanted the journal to be independent of any one political party or faction. Thus, over the years it has published a wide variety of contributors – from anarchists, to union members, to centrists.

During the 1980s, the publication became known for its investigative reporting of the Iran–Contra affair. It later broke stories on the deliberate destruction of Iraqi water treatment plants by US forces during the first Gulf War (1990–1991), on global warming, and on the emergence of mad cow disease.

Up until 1992, In These Times was a biweekly publication and a democratic-socialist competitor to the National Guardian, which was a biweekly closer in ideology to Marxism–Leninism.

Senior editor Silja J. A. Talvi won two National Council on Crime and Delinquency PASS Awards (2005, 2006) for her reporting on the impact of three strikes sentencing on African-American men, and on the trend toward privatization of the prison system. In These Times was awarded the Utne Reader's Independent Press Award for Best Political Coverage in 2006.

== Contributors ==
Two of the magazine's longest-running columns are Salim Muwakkil's The Third Coast, covering race relations, and Susan J. Douglas's Back Talk, a critical review of the mass media.

David Moberg has reported on labor and political economy for the magazine since its inception in 1976.

Joel Bleifuss was editor from the mid-1980s until April 2022. More stories from his column, The First Stone, have been included in Project Censored's "Top 25 Censored Stories of the Year" than of any other journalist.

Other columnists include H. Candace Gorman, Laura S. Washington and Terry J. Allen.

Senior editors include Allen, Patricia Aufderheide, Douglas, Moberg, Muwakkil and David Sirota.

Notable contributors to the magazine have included:

- Noam Chomsky
- Alexander Cockburn
- Barbara Ehrenreich
- Norman Finkelstein
- Laura Flanders
- Annette Fuentes
- James Foley
- Juan Gonzalez
- David Graeber
- Glenn Greenwald
- Miles Harvey
- Doug Ireland
- John Judis
- Garrison Keillor
- Naomi Klein
- Robert W. McChesney
- Rick Perlstein
- Jeffrey St. Clair
- Jane Slaughter
- James Thindwa
- Michael VanRooyen
- Kurt Vonnegut
- Joan Walsh
- Fred Weir
- Paul Wellstone
- Slavoj Žižek

== See also ==
- Institute for Nonprofit News, membership organization that In These Times was selected to join
- List of newspapers in Illinois
- List of political magazines
- List of United States magazines
- Media in Chicago
