= Corporate liberalism =

Corporate liberalism is a thesis in United States historiography that describes an interdependent relationship between large corporations and government regulatory agencies. Proponents of the thesis argue that the corporate elite often serve as the primary lobbyists for and beneficiaries of government regulations. In this view, corporate liberalism acted as a mechanism for American "open door" imperialism by aligning industrial interests with state policy. The thesis posits that corporate executives and high-ranking government officials formed a unified elite class. According to this framework, the system is designed to maintain the power of this elite by mitigating class conflict. To prevent potential social instability or revolution, the theory suggests that the state and corporate sectors coordinate to present a façade of conflict, encouraging the working class to support either the business or the state wing of the same establishment.

The intellectual roots of the thesis are often attributed to the work of Adolf A. Berle. Historian Ellis Hawley identifies Berle as a primary "articulator and shaper" of the concept. In his 1932 work, The Modern Corporation and Private Property, Berle documented the emergence of a managerial elite and posited the development of a "neutral technocracy" defined by social responsibility and public trusteeship.

== Overview ==
Corporate liberalism's principal text is James Weinstein's The Corporate Ideal in the Liberal State, 1900-1918.

Corporate liberalism functions via a façade of opposition between a purportedly progressive statocracy and a purportedly pro-market plutocracy. The con operates by co-opting potential opponents of the establishment; those who recognise that something’s amiss with the statocratic wing are lured into supporting the plutocratic wing, and vice versa...Perhaps the balance of power shifts slightly toward one side or the other; but the system remains essentially unchanged.

— Roderick T. Long

Carl Oglesby describes corporate liberalism as a cooperation between those with the most military power and those with the most industrial power. Oglesby suggests that "corporate liberalism...performs for the corporate state a function quite like what the Church once performed for the feudal state. It seeks to justify its burdens and protect it from change".

Roderick T. Long writes similarly that state and corporate power have a symbiotic relationship. Long writes about the alleged realizations of corporate liberalism during the 1960s, the realizations that the business class was hardly a "persecuted minority" and that the state hardly a "bulwark of the poor against the plutocracy".

Weinstein's idea of corporate liberalism should not be confused with Ellis W. Hawley's use of the term (Daniel T. Rodgers noted that Hawley's use of "corporate liberalism" was more a description of liberal corporatism than anything else). It should not also be confused with the concepts developed by Martin J. Sklar, who invented the term "corporate liberalism" in an article on Woodrow Wilson first published in 1960 when he was in graduate school in history at the University of Wisconsin. Sklar published the essay in Studies on the Left, where he and Weinstein were co-editors. Sklar's writing about corporate liberalism was a major influence on Weinstein's thinking (which Weinstein himself acknowledged in the preface to his book, The Corporate Ideal in the Liberal State). Arguing that the rise of the large corporation "as the dominant mode of business enterprise" was the result of a concerted effort by capitalists and like-minded political leaders and intellectuals, Sklar wrote that corporate liberalism was the "bourgeois Yankee cousin of modern European and English social democracy".

Sklar subsequently refined and developed the corporate liberal concept in a 1988 book, The Corporate Reconstruction of American Capitalism, which significantly differed from Weinstein's interpretation. On pages 34–35, Sklar defined corporate liberalism as the ideology of the political movement that accomplished the corporate reconstruction of the United States political-economic order on the basis of a mutual adjustment between corporate capitalism and the American liberal tradition. In keeping with that tradition, corporate liberalism upheld the corporate administered market and the rise of regulatory government, but not a "corporate state" or a statist command system. Sklar did not see corporate liberalism as simply the ideology of corporate capitalists, but rather as a broad cross-class ideology "expressing the inter-relations of corporate capitalists, political leaders, intellectuals, proprietary capitalists, professionals, and reformers, workers and trade union leaders, populists, and socialists—all of those who could, to a greater or lesser extent, identify their outlook or their interest in administered markets and government regulation, with the rise, legitimation, and institutionalization of the corporate capitalist order".

According to Sklar's account, corporate liberalism was not a monolithic ideology, but unfolded in several major political variants that there were at once "mutually complimentary and in conflict with one another". On the left, they were Theodore Roosevelt's "statist-tending corporate liberalism"; on the center-left, Woodrow Wilson's "regulatory corporate liberalism"; and on the center-right, William Howard Taft's "minimalist regulatory corporate liberalism". Sklar continued saying: "It was from this three-way progressive split that sprang the major divisions of twentieth-century American politics with respect to political-economic policy formation".

Other historians who advocate similar theories of United States history include Gabriel Kolko and Murray Rothbard. The thesis of corporate liberalism has similarities with the ideas of the organizational synthesis school of Alfred D. Chandler Jr., Samuel P. Hays, Robert Wiebe and Louis Galambos.

== See also ==
- Institutional theory
- Trustee model of representation
- Public trustee
- Corporate sociopolitical activism and "woke capitalism"
