= David Moberg =

David Moberg may refer to:

- David Moberg (journalist), journalist for In These Times
- David O. Moberg (1922–2023), American scholar of religion

== See also ==
- David Moberg Karlsson, (born 1994), Swedish footballer
