= Adrienne Stiff-Roberts =

American electrical engineer

- Education: Spelman College (B.S.) Georgia Institute of Technology (B.S.E.E.) University of Michigan (M.Sc.Eng, Ph.D.)
- Scientific career
- Fields: Electrical engineering
- Workplaces: Duke University
- Website: http://stiffrobertslab.pratt.duke.edu/

Adrienne Stiff-Roberts is an American electrical engineering and Jeffrey N. Vinik Professor of Electrical and computer engineering at Duke University. Her research is on novel hybrid materials for optoelectronic and energy devices.

== Early life and education ==
Stiff-Roberts completed her bachelor's degree in physics at Spelman College in 1991. She was part of a NASA and Spelman College Women in Science and Engineering program. Through this program, Stiff-Roberts worked as an intern at Ames Research Center during the summer. She then joined the Georgia Institute of Technology, where she earned a Bachelor of Engineering in 1999. She moved to the University of Michigan for her graduate studies, during which she investigated quantum dot photodetectors, gaining her PhD in 2004. She was a member of Phi Beta Kappa. She was funded by the David and Lucile Packard Foundation Graduate Scholars Fellowship and AT&T Labs Fellowship. She was also awarded the Burroughs Wellcome Fund.

== Research and career ==
At Duke University, which she joined in 2004, Stiff-Roberts leads a lab focussed on Resonant Infrared Matrix-Assisted Pulsed Laser Evaporation (RIR-MAPLE). This is a versatile technology that has evolved from pulsed laser deposition, which offers precise control of a material's composition. The technique involves freezing a solution of molecular building blocks, then blasting them with a laser in a vacuum chamber. The laser is tuned to the molecular bonds of the frozen solvent. She is working with David Mitzi to create perovskite solar cells.

Stiff-Roberts is involved with several initiatives to improve diversity within engineering. At Duke University Stiff-Roberts runs the Student Engineers Network, Strengthening Opportunities in Research (SENSOR) Saturday Academy for minority students in the 8th grade. In 2017, Stiff-Roberts took part in Duke University's celebration of Hidden Figures. She is a member of the National Society of Black Physicists.

In 2019, Stiff-Roberts was promoted to be the Jeffrey N. Vinik Professor of Electrical and Computer Engineering.

== Honors and awards ==
- 2020 ECE Willie Hobbs Moore Distinguished Alumni Lectureship.
- 2016 Julian Abele Award for Graduate Mentor of the Year, Duke University Mary Lou Williams Center, Black Student Alliance, and Black Graduate and Professional Student Association. 2016
- 2009 Institute of Electrical and Electronics Engineers Early Career Award in Nanotechnology
- 2008 Presidential Early Career Award for Scientists and Engineers, Office of Naval Research
- 2007 Young Investigator Program Award, Office of Naval Research
- 2006 National Science Foundation CAREER Award
