= Ed Bradley =

American journalist (1941–2006)

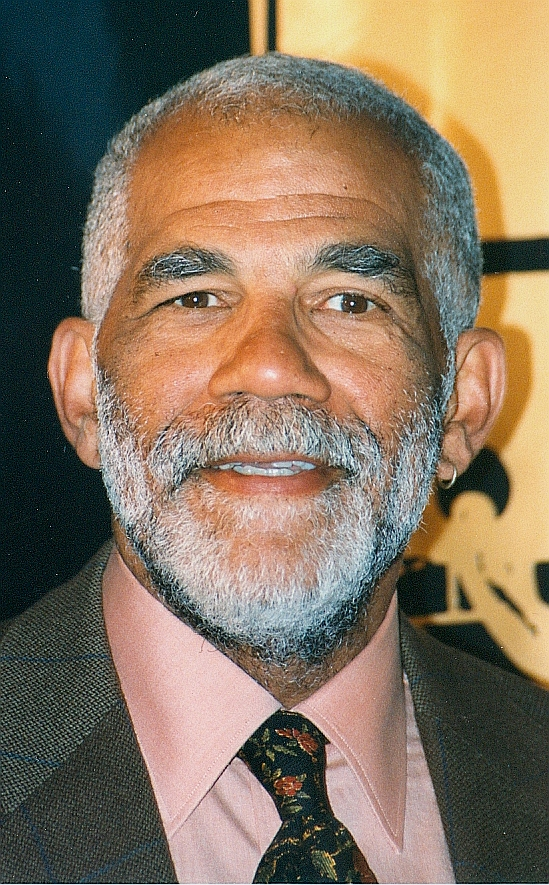
- Bradley in 2001
- Born: Edward Rudolph Bradley Jr. June 22, 1941; Philadelphia, Pennsylvania, U.S.
- Died: November 9, 2006 (aged 65); New York City, U.S.
- Education: Cheyney State College (BS)
- Occupation: Journalist
- Years active: 1964–2006
- Employer: CBS News
- Television: 60 Minutes; CBS News
- Spouses: Diane Jefferson; Priscilla Coolidge; Patricia Blanchet
- Awards

Edward Rudolph Bradley Jr. (June 22, 1941 – November 9, 2006) was an American broadcast journalist and news anchor who is best known for reporting with 60 Minutes and CBS News.

After graduating from Cheyney State College, Bradley became a teacher and part-time radio disc jockey and reporter in Philadelphia, where his first major story was covering the 1964 Philadelphia race riot. He moved to New York City in 1967 and worked for WCBS as a radio news reporter. Four years later, Bradley moved to Paris, France, where he covered the Paris Peace Accords as a stringer for CBS News. In 1972, he transferred to Vietnam and covered the Vietnam War and the Cambodian Civil War, coverage for which he won Alfred I. duPont and George Polk awards. Bradley moved to Washington, D.C. following the wars and covered Jimmy Carter's first presidential campaign. He became CBS News' first African American White House correspondent, holding the position from 1976 to 1978. During this time, Bradley also anchored the Sunday night broadcast of the CBS Evening News, a position he held until 1981.

In 1981, Bradley joined 60 Minutes. While working for CBS News and 60 Minutes, he reported on approximately 500 stories and won numerous Peabody and Emmy awards for his work. He covered a wide range of topics, including the rescue of Vietnamese refugees, segregation in the United States, the AIDS epidemic in Africa, and sexual abuse within the Catholic Church. Bradley died in 2006 of leukemia.

== Early life and education ==
Edward Rudolph Bradley Jr. was born on June 22, 1941, in Philadelphia, Pennsylvania. His parents divorced when he was young and he was raised in a poor household by his mother, Gladys Gaston Bradley, and spent summers with his father, Edward Sr., in Detroit. Bradley attended high school at Mount Saint Charles Academy in Rhode Island and Saint Thomas More Catholic Boys School in Philadelphia, graduating from the latter in 1959. He received a Bachelor of Science degree in education from Cheyney State College in 1964. While at Cheyney State, Bradley played offensive tackle for the school's football team.

== Career ==
=== 1964–1971: Early career ===
Bradley began his career as a math teacher in Philadelphia in 1964. While working as a teacher, he also worked at WDAS as a disc jockey. While working for WDAS, Bradley covered the 1964 Philadelphia race riot and interviewed Martin Luther King Jr. Those experiences led him to pursue a career as a journalist, with Bradley later saying, "I knew that God put me on this Earth to be on the radio." Bradley moved to New York City in 1967, working for WCBS. While there, Bradley found he was primarily assigned stories most relevant to African American listeners. After confronting his editor about those assignments, Bradley received assignments on a broader array of topics. Bradley left WCBS in 1971.

=== 1971–1981: Vietnam, White House and CBS Evening News ===
Bradley moved to Paris, France, in 1971. He was fluent in French, and while there was hired by CBS News as a stringer. He transferred to Saigon in 1972 to report on the Vietnam War and Cambodian Civil War, as well as reporting on the Paris Peace Accords. While in Cambodia, Bradley was wounded by a mortar round. He transferred to CBS's Washington bureau in 1974, returning to Asia the following year to continue reporting on both wars. Bradley was one of the last American journalists to be evacuated in 1975 during the Fall of Saigon. He was awarded Alfred I. duPont and George Polk awards for his coverage in Vietnam and Cambodia.

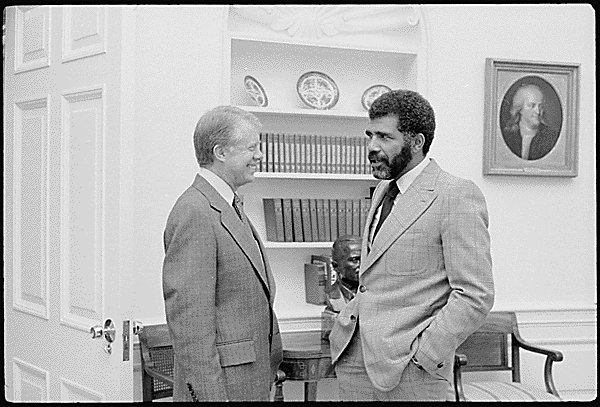
U.S. President Jimmy Carter is pictured with Bradley in 1978.

In 1976, Bradley was assigned to cover Jimmy Carter's presidential campaign, as well as the Republican and Democratic national conventions, covering them until 1996. Following Carter's victory, Bradley became CBS's first African American White House correspondent, a position he held from 1976 to 1978. Bradley disliked the position as it tied him to the movements of the president. Also in 1976, Bradley began anchoring the Sunday night broadcasts of the CBS Evening News, holding the post until 1981. In 1978, he became one of the principal correspondents for the documentary program CBS Reports, also leaving in 1981.

Bradley won the first of 20 News and Documentary Emmy Awards in his career for his 1979 documentary "The Boat People", reporting on Vietnamese refugees escaping the country via boat or ship, at one point wading into the water to assist in the rescue of the refugees. "The Boat People" also earned Bradley an Edward Murrow Award, a duPont citation, and a commendation from the British Academy of Film and Television Arts. The same year, another Bradley documentary, "Blacks in America: With All Deliberate Speed?", aired. The documentary detailed segregation in the United States and how the treatment of African Americans in the U.S. had changed since Brown v. Board of Education. The two-hour program also won duPont and Emmy awards.

=== 1981–2006: 60 Minutes ===
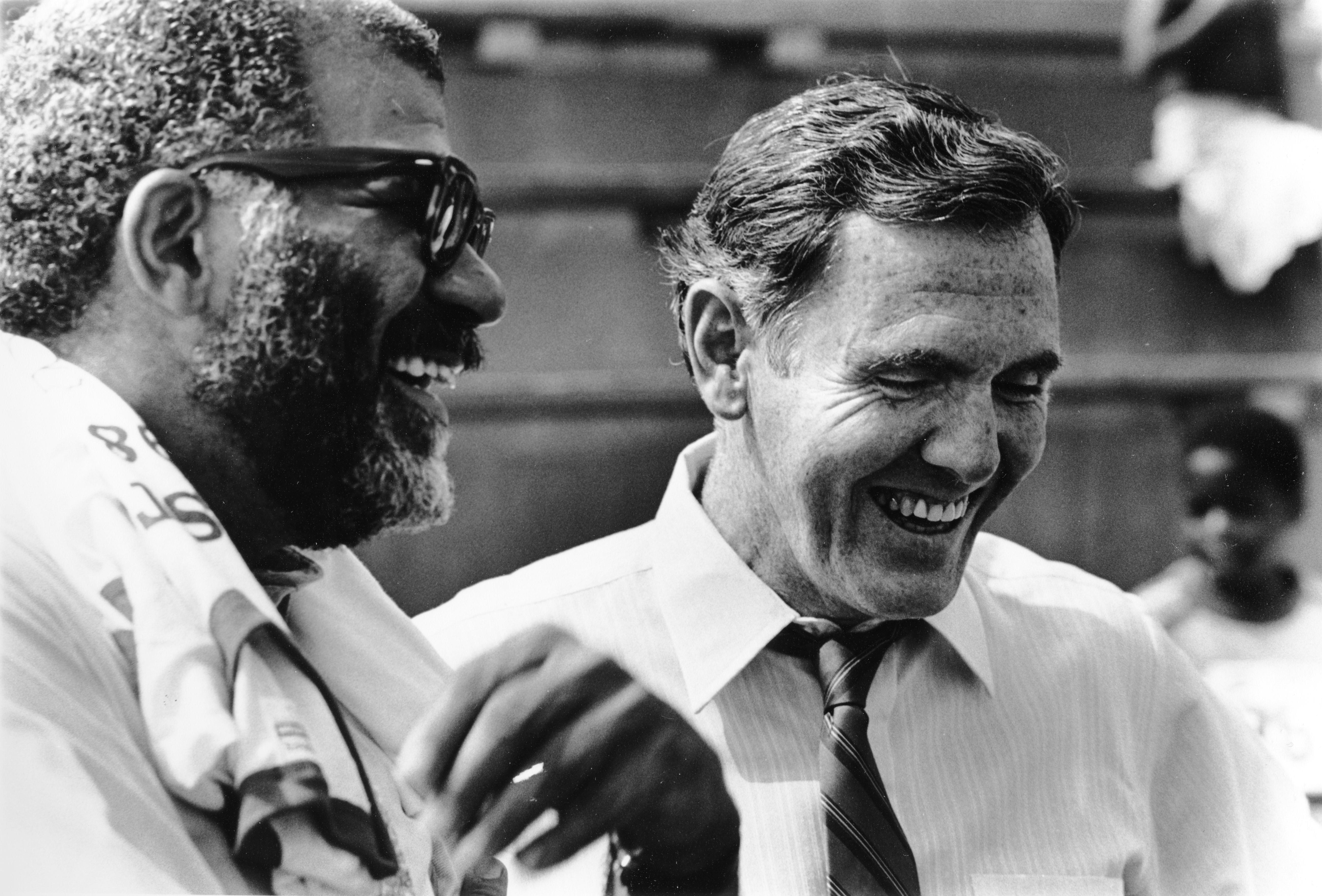
Bradley with Boston mayor Raymond Flynn in 1985

Following Dan Rather's move to the CBS Evening News, Bradley joined the news magazine program 60 Minutes. According to producer Don Hewitt, Bradley's "calm, cool, and collected" reporting style was the right fit for the program. His interview style has drawn comparisons to television detective Columbo and been described as "disarming", "confident", and "streetwise". He was noted for his ability to get interview subjects to divulge information on camera with his body language. In his first decade on 60 Minutes, Bradley reported numerous high-profile stories on a variety of topics, including with Lena Horne, convicted criminal and author Jack Henry Abbott, and on schizophrenia. He won Emmys for all three stories.

In 1986, Bradley interviewed singer Liza Minnelli and expressed interest in wearing an earring. Minnelli gave him a diamond stud after the interview, which Bradley began wearing on air. He was the first male reporter to consistently wear an earring on air, "challenging the notions of journalistic propriety", according to Robb Report writer Kristopher Fraser. He became known for bucking fashion trends for newscasters. His iconic style included an array of patterns, a short beard, and the earring worn in his left ear. Mike Wallace said after Bradley's death that he thought Bradley's decision to wear an earring inspired others to do the same.

Bradley repeatedly turned down offers to anchor the CBS Evening News in the late 1980s, preferring instead to continue working on 60 Minutes. His reporting in the 1990s included such topics as Chinese forced labor camps, Russian military installations, and the effects of nuclear weapons testing near Semey, Kazakhstan. He also profiled numerous people, including Thomas Quasthoff, Muhammad Ali, and Mike Tyson. He won a series of awards for his reporting that decade, including Emmys, duPont citations, and a Peabody Award. Bradley also anchored CBS's Street Stories from 1992 to 1993. In 1995, he was awarded the grand prize Robert F. Kennedy Journalism Award for the CBS Reports documentary "In the Killing Fields of America".

Throughout the 2000s until his death in 2006, Bradley continued to cover a variety of topics, including the AIDS epidemic in Africa, sexual abuse within the Catholic Church, and the 1955 murder of Emmett Till. He also interviewed high-profile people, such as Bob Dylan and Neil Armstrong, and conducted the only television interview with Timothy McVeigh. Bradley reported approximately 500 stories for 60 Minutes over his 25-year tenure with the program, more than any other correspondent over the same time period. In 2005, Bradley was awarded a Lifetime Achievement Award by the National Association of Black Journalists.

Bradley's reporting was not without criticism. Washington Post columnist Brock Yates questioned the completeness of Bradley's 1986 report on acceleration systems failures with the Audi 5000 sedan and why Audi engineers reportedly could not reproduce the problem. In 1989, Bradley reported on daminozide, a chemical used on apples, as well as seven pesticides used on the fruit. His report called daminozide a carcinogen particularly dangerous to children and sparked a national panic. Scientists with the American Society of Toxiocology noted a lack of scientific evidence in Bradley's report and the United States Environmental Protection Agency and Food and Drug Administration issued a joint statement 18 days after Bradley's story aired, declaring apples safe to eat. A trade group of apple growers from Washington sued 60 Minutes after the story aired, but had their claims dismissed after the United States Supreme Court upheld an appeals court ruling that the association failed to disprove Bradley's story. His coverage of Kathleen Willey, who accused Bill Clinton of sexual misconduct in the 1990s, drew criticism for not pushing Willey in his interview, giving her a disproportionate amount of airtime, and leaving out important information from Clinton's attorney Robert Bennett. The integrity of his December 2003 interview with Michael Jackson was also called into question after CBS refused to air a music special unless Jackson discussed molestation charges with CBS News. Jackson was paid an undisclosed sum for the special by CBS's entertainment division.

== Illness and death ==
Bradley was diagnosed with lymphocytic leukemia in his later years, keeping the illness secret from many, including colleagues such as Wallace. His health rapidly declined after contracting an infection, but Bradley continued to work, saying that he preferred to die "with [his] boots on". Bradley filed 20 stories in his final year with 60 Minutes, conducting his last interviews with members of the Duke University lacrosse team accused of rape weeks before his death. Bradley died at Mount Sinai Hospital in Manhattan on November 9, 2006, at the age of 65.

More than 2,000 people attended Bradley's funeral service at Riverside Church in New York. Among the attendees were the Reverends Al Sharpton and Jesse Jackson, musicians Jimmy Buffett and Wynton Marsalis, journalists Dan Rather, Walter Cronkite, and Charlayne Hunter-Gault, and former U.S. president Bill Clinton. In April 2007, Bradley was honored with a jazz funeral mass and procession at St. Augustine Church during the New Orleans Jazz & Heritage Festival.

== Legacy ==
=== Impact of journalism ===
House Resolution 1084 To Honor the Contributions and Life of Edward R. Bradley (2006)

Morley Safer described the themes of Bradley's reporting as "justice, justice served and justice denied". Bradley's reporting on the AIDS epidemic in Africa has been credited with convincing drug companies to donate and discount drugs to treat the disease. His reporting on psychiatric hospitals in the U.S. prompted federal investigations into the largest chains, and his reporting on the Duke lacrosse team has been credited with ensuring the accused had a fair trial. Broadcast on October 15, 2006, the 60 Minutes edition that had Bradley's interview with the Duke lacrosse players had nearly 17 million viewers. It was the ninth-most watched show that week and one of the highest rated episodes of the year. Bradley was seen as an inspiration for Black Americans, with columnist Clarence Page writing:

Mr. Bradley challenged the system. He worked hard and prepared himself. He opened himself to the world and dared the world to turn him away. He wanted to be a lot, and he succeeded. Thanks to him, the rest of us know that we can too.

Salim Muwakkil wrote for The Progressive about Bradley's impact on Black journalists, noting that Bradley "proved blacks not only could do the job, but they could do it with panache". Matt Zoller Seitz, writing for Slant Magazine, said Bradley forced audiences and the television news industry to "accept him on his own terms" and that he "annihilate[d] received wisdom about what it meant to be a professional journalist, a black man and an American".

=== Philanthropy and honors ===
In 1994, Bradley and the Radio Television News Directors Association Foundation started a scholarship program in his name for journalists of color. It awards $10,000 annually. In 2007, he was inducted into the Broadcast Pioneers of Philadelphia Hall of Fame.

Bradley was named one of the "100 Outstanding American Journalists in the last 100 years" in 2012 by faculty at New York University. In 2015, the Pennsylvania General Assembly renamed City Avenue in Philadelphia "Ed Bradley Way". A mural of Bradley was completed in the city in 2018, and a historical marker was installed in 2021.

== Personal life ==
Bradley was fond of jazz and hosted Jazz at Lincoln Center on National Public Radio. He performed with Jimmy Buffett and the Neville Brothers and was referred to as "the fifth Neville brother" by the group. He was an outdoorsman, and often hiked or skied in his free time.

Bradley married three times, to Diane Jefferson, Priscilla Coolidge, and Patricia Blanchet. He split his time between homes in New York and Colorado.

== Awards and recognition ==
Year	Recognized work	Award / honor	Organization	Result	Ref.
1979	Reporting on Cambodian refugees	George Polk Award for Foreign Television Reporting	Long Island University	Won	
1979	Reporting on Cambodian refugees	Alfred I. duPont–Columbia University Award	Columbia University	Won	
1979	"The Boat People"	Edward R. Murrow Award	Overseas Press Club	Won	
1979	"The Boat People"	News and Documentary Emmy Award	Academy of Television Arts and Sciences	Won	
1979	"The Boat People"	Commendation	British Academy of Film and Television Arts	Won	
1979	"Blacks in America: With All Deliberate Speed?"	News and Documentary Emmy Award	Academy of Television Arts and Sciences	Won	
1979	"The Boston Goes to China"	George Foster Peabody Award	National Association of Broadcasters	Won	
1979	"The Boston Goes to China"	News and Documentary Emmy Award	Academy of Television Arts and Sciences	Won	
1979	"The Boston Goes to China"	Ohio State Award	Ohio State University	Won	
1980	"The Boat People"	Alfred I. duPont–Columbia University Award	Columbia University	Won	
1981	"Blacks in America: With All Deliberate Speed?"	Alfred I. duPont–Columbia University Award	Columbia University	Won	
1983	"Lena"	News and Documentary Emmy Award	Academy of Television Arts and Sciences	Won	
1983	"In the Belly of the Beast"	News and Documentary Emmy Award	Academy of Television Arts and Sciences	Won	
1985	"Schizophrenia"	News and Documentary Emmy Award	Academy of Television Arts and Sciences	Won	
1993	"Made in China"	Alfred I. duPont–Columbia University Award	Columbia University	Won	
1993	"Made in China"	News and Documentary Emmy Award	Academy of Television Arts and Sciences	Won	
1993	"Caitlin's Story"	News and Documentary Emmy Award	Academy of Television Arts and Sciences	Won	
1993	"Withholding Information"	News and Documentary Emmy Award	Academy of Television Arts and Sciences	Nominated	
1995	"Semipalatinsk"	Alfred I. duPont–Columbia University Award	Columbia University	Won	
1995	"Semipalatinsk"	News and Documentary Emmy Award	Academy of Television Arts and Sciences	Won	
1995	Reporting on Russian and American military bases	Overseas Press Club Award	Overseas Press Club	Won	
1995	"In the Killing Fields of America"	Robert F. Kennedy Journalism Award, grand prize	Robert F. Kennedy Center for Justice and Human Rights	Won	
1997	"Big Man, Big Voice"	George Foster Peabody Award	National Association of Broadcasters	Won	
1997	Body of journalism work	Black History Maker Award	Associated Black Charities	Won	
1998	"Enter the Jury Room"	Alfred I. duPont–Columbia University Award	Columbia University	Won	
1998	"Town Under Siege"	News and Documentary Emmy Award	Academy of Television Arts and Sciences	Nominated	
2000	"Death by Denial"	Peabody Award	National Association of Broadcasters	Won	
2000	Lifetime achievement in electronic reporting	Paul White Award	Radio Television Digital News Association	Won	
2001	"Timothy McVeigh"	News and Documentary Emmy Award	Academy of Television Arts and Sciences	Won	
2001	"Death by Denial"	Outstanding Investigative Journalism Program	Academy of Television Arts and Sciences	Nominated	
2001	"Ten Extraordinary Women"	Outstanding Coverage of a Continuing News Story	Academy of Television Arts and Sciences	Nominated	
2002	"An American Town"	Outstanding Coverage of a Continuing News Story–Long Form	Academy of Television Arts and Sciences	Nominated	
2002	"Columbine"	Outstanding Investigative Journalism–Long Form	Academy of Television Arts and Sciences	Nominated	
2003	Career excellence	Lifetime Achievement Award	Academy of Television Arts and Sciences	Won	
2003	"Unhealthy Diagnosis"	Emmy Award for Business and Financial Reporting	Academy of Television Arts and Sciences	Won	
2003	"A New Lease on Life"	Outstanding Feature Story in a News Magazine	Academy of Television Arts and Sciences	Won	
2003	"The Church on Trial"	Outstanding Coverage of a Continuing News Story in a News Magazine	Academy of Television Arts and Sciences	Won	
2003	Career excellence	Damon Runyon Award for Career Journalistic Excellence	Denver Press Club	Won	
2004	"Alice Coles of Bayview"	Outstanding Feature Story in a News Magazine	Academy of Television Arts and Sciences	Nominated	
2005	Career excellence	Lifetime Achievement Award	National Association of Black Journalists	Won	
2005	"The Murder of Emmett Till"	Outstanding Continuing Coverage of a News Story in a News Magazine	Academy of Television Arts and Sciences	Won	
2005	Body of journalism work	Leonard Zeidenberg First Amendment Award	Radio Television Digital News Association	Won	
2006	"First Man"	Outstanding Interview in a News Magazine	Academy of Television Arts and Sciences	Won	
2006	Career excellence	Lew Klein Award for Excellence	Temple University	Won	
2007	"The Duke Rape case"	George Foster Peabody Award	National Association of Broadcasters	Won	
2007	"The Duke Rape case"	Best Report in a News Magazine	Academy of Television Arts and Sciences	Won	
2007	"Hunting the Homeless"	Outstanding Continuing Coverage of a News Story in a News Magazine	Academy of Television Arts and Sciences	Nominated	
2007	Career excellence	Broadcast Pioneers Hall of Fame	Broadcast Pioneers of Philadelphia	Inducted	
2017	"Muhammad Ali: Remembering a Legend" (Note: Bradley was nominated posthumously. CBS used archival footage of Bradley's 1996 interview with Ali in a 48 Hours special about Ali's life.)	Outstanding Coverage of a Breaking News Story in a News Magazine	Academy of Television Arts and Sciences	Nominated	

== See also ==
- History of African Americans in Philadelphia
- The Interviews: An Oral History of Television
- List of Cheyney University of Pennsylvania alumni
- List of people from Philadelphia
- National Association of Black Journalists Hall of Fame
