= Studies on the Left =

American leftist journal (1959–1967)

Studies on the Left was a journal of New Left radicalism in the United States published between 1959 and 1967 in Madison, Wisconsin, and later in New York City.

Its authors, at first mostly graduate students at the University of Wisconsin, came to include many of the major figures of sixties radicalism, and not only from the U.S.: Martin J. Sklar, Murray Rothbard, Lee Baxandall, James Weinstein, Eleanor Hakim, Michael Lebowitz, Ronald Radosh, Gabriel Kolko, James B. Gilbert, Saul Landau, Lloyd Gardner, Eugene D. Genovese, Norman Fruchter, Staughton Lynd, Ronald Aronson, William Appleman Williams, Raymond Williams, and Tom Hayden.

Studies advocated a socialism distinct from the variant found in the Soviet Union, and was important in the rebirth of radical intellectual life after early 1950s McCarthyism. The journal's republication of C. Wright Mills' "Letter to the New Left" in 1961 (originally published in New Left Review in 1960) marked one of the first appearances of "New Left" in American discourse. The journal's chief claim to theoretical distinction was its use of "corporate liberalism" as a descriptive term for the 20th century economic and political system typified by the U.S. and characterized by a warfare-welfare state.

The journal moved from Madison to New York City in 1963. In 1965 it changed from a quarterly to a bimonthly. The last issue appeared in March–April 1967. After its demise, a tribute to Studies cited two areas in which it had made a contribution to radical thinking:

(1) It identified welfare state liberalism as the political ideology of the large corporation throughout this century, and, therefore, as the dominant political ideology in the United States. (2) It began the process of orienting socialist thought toward the problem of building a post-industrial socialism.

Some of the former Studies on the Left editors worked on a successor journal, Socialist Revolution, which was later renamed Socialist Review.
