= Fred Weir =

Canadian journalist in Russia

Fred Weir is a Canadian journalist who lives in Moscow and specializes in Russian affairs. He has been the Moscow correspondent for the Boston-based daily The Christian Science Monitor and for the monthly Chicago magazine In These Times. He has been a regular contributor from Moscow to The Independent, South China Morning Post and The Canadian Press. He was also for 20 years the Moscow correspondent of Hindustan Times an Indian, English-language, daily newspaper based in Delhi. Weir is the co-author, along with David Michael Kotz, of Revolution from Above: The Demise of the Soviet System, published in 1996, which provides a new interpretation and research for the disintegration of the USSR.

Weir was a third generation red diaper baby whose uncle had trained at the Lenin School in Moscow in the 1920s to be an agent of the Comintern. Weir's father, Charles Weir, was an International Union of Mine, Mill and Smelter Workers organizer and Communist Party of Canada activist who was an election candidate under the party banner. Weir studied Russian and Soviet history at the University of Toronto as well as graduating from teacher's college. He lived on a kibbutz in Israel in 1973–74, travelled extensively around the Middle East, the USSR and Eastern Europe, before choosing to move to the Soviet Union to live and work as the Moscow correspondent for the Canadian Tribune in 1986 during the early days of glasnost and perestroika. In the early 1990s he began freelancing for Canadian Press and various publications. He has been Moscow correspondent for the Christian Science Monitor since 1998. He married Mariam Shaumian, a Russian-Armenian, in 1987. They have two children: Tanya, born in 1988, and Charlie, born in 2000.
