= Peter Jaszi =

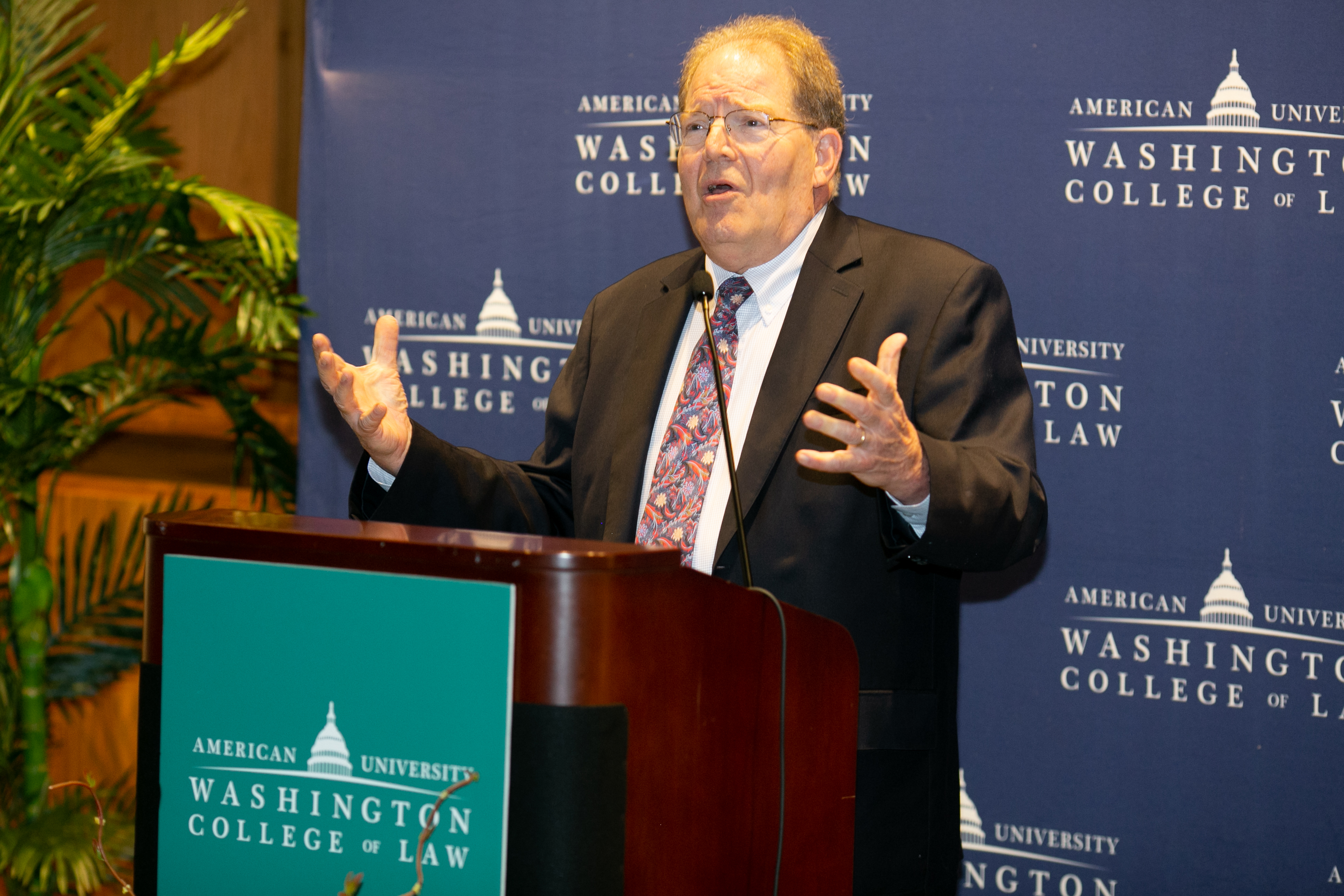
Peter Jaszi speaking at the 7th Peter Jaszi Lecture, Washington College of Law, American University

Peter Jaszi is a widely known expert on copyright law and author, with Patricia Aufderheide, of Reclaiming Fair Use (2012), which examines the state of fair use and the importance to scholarship, art, and free expression of strengthening the doctrine.

== Personal life ==
Jaszi is the grandson of Hungarian historian Oszkár Jászi.

== Education ==
Jaszi earned a B.A. degree from Harvard University in 1968 and a J.D. degree from Harvard Law School in 1971.

== Career ==
Jaszi was one of the founders in 1995 of the "Digital Future Coalition", an organization of library associations and other public interest groups engaging in copyright advocacy during the late 1990s. Jaszi has testified numerous times before Congress on copyright matters, and in 1994 served on the Librarian of Congress' Advisory Commission on Copyright Registration and Deposit. Jaszi also serves as a trustee of the Copyright Society of the U.S.A., the primary scholarly society dedicated to copyright law.

Jaszi is currently emeritus Professor of Law at American University's Washington College of Law, and Founder of the Glushko-Samuelson Intellectual Property Law Clinic.

== Awards and honors ==
- Lyman Ray Patterson Copyright Award, from the American Library Association (2007)
- Champion of Intellectual Property, IP Section of the District of Columbia Bar (2009)
- IP3 Award, Public Knowledge (2011)

== Bibliography ==
- Reclaiming Fair Use (with Patricia Aufderheide) (2012)
- "Toward a Theory of Copyright: The Metamorphoses of" Authorship"", Duke Law Journal (1991)
- "On the author effect: contemporary copyright and collective creativity", Cardozo Arts & Entertainment Law Journal (1991)
- Editor, The Construction of Authorship: Textual Appropriation in Law and Literature (Duke University Press, 1994)
- Copyright in Transition (with Martha Woodmansee) in History of the Book in America, Volume IV)
- "Is There Such a Thing as Post-Modern Copyright?" in Making and Unmaking Intellectual Property (2011), edited with Martha Woodmansee and Mario Biagioi
