= List of Cheyney University of Pennsylvania alumni =

This is a list of Cheyney University of Pennsylvania alumni by class year:

== Alumni ==
Name	Class year	Notability	Reference(s)
Reba Dickerson-Hill	1940	Dickerson-Hill was an artist who painted in the Japanese brush technique sumi-e. She graduated from Cheyney State Teachers College in 1940 and taught elementary grades in the Philadelphia School District before becoming a full-time painter. Her mediums included watercolor, oil and acrylics. She als produced prints. She participated in major exhibitions for Black artists in Philadelphia in 1969 and Washington, DC, in 1971, as well as local shows. She won awards from the Sumi-e Society of America.	
Octavius Catto	1858	Catto was the class valedictorian in 1858 at the Institute for Colored Youth (later Cheyney University). An activist, Catto was influential in getting the Fifteenth Amendment to the United States Constitution passed in 1870 which gave black men (but not black women) the right to vote. Catto is also the founder of the first black baseball team in the United States (The Philadelphia Pythians, 1867) and an early member of the National Equal Rights League (Oct. 1864).	
Joseph E. Lee	ca. 1863	Graduated from the Institute for Colored Youth (presently Cheyney University) in the early 1860s and received law degree from Howard University in 1873. He was admitted to The Florida Bar that year and was one of the first black people to practice law in Florida. He was a member of the Florida House of Representatives from 1875-1880 and the Florida Senate from 1881-82.	
Rebecca J. Cole	1863	Graduated from the Institute for Colored Youth in 1863 (now Cheyney University). She graduated from Women's Medical College (now the Drexel University College of Medicine) in 1867 with a medical degree. Cole was the second African-American woman physician in the United States and the first black woman to graduate from the Women's Medical College of Pennsylvania.	
James B. Dudley	ca. 1870	Graduated from the Institute for Colored Youth around 1875 (now Cheyney University). For college Dudley attended Shaw College in Raleigh, North Carolina. Throughout his education he focused on learning to become an educator. In 1880, at age 21, Dudley passed the North Carolina state exam required to obtain a teacher's certificate. Later he attended Harvard summer school and gained an M.A. from Livingstone College and an LL.D. from Wilberforce University. Dudley became President of North Carolina Agricultural and Technical State University in 1896 and held that position until his death in 1925.	
Josephine Silone Yates	pre-1877	African American writer, teacher, and civil rights advocate whose primary education was at the Institute for Colored Youth (now Cheyney University).	
Julian Abele	ca. 1896	Prominent African-American architect. Upon Abele's graduation in 1902 as the first black student in architecture at the University of Pennsylvania, Abele designed or contributed to the design of some 250 buildings, including Harvard’s Widener Memorial Library, Duke University, the Philadelphia Museum of Art, the Free Library of Philadelphia, and many Gilded Age mansions in Newport and New York City.	
Bayard Rustin	ca. 1937	Openly gay African-American civil rights activist	
S. Howard Woodson	ca. 1938	First African-American to serve as Speaker of the New Jersey General Assembly since Reconstruction.	
Marcus Foster	1947	African-American educator who gained a national reputation for educational excellence while serving as principal of Gratz High School in Philadelphia, Pennsylvania, as Associate Superintendent of Schools in Philadelphia, and as the first black Superintendent of the Oakland Unified School District in Oakland, California	
Robert L. Woodson Sr.	1962	Civil rights activist, community development leader, author, National Urban League director, "Genius Grant" winner, founder and president of the Woodson Center that supports neighborhood-based initiatives to revitalize low-income communities, who holds a Master of Social Work degree from the University of Pennsylvania	
Don Evans	1962	Graduated from Cheyney State College in 1962. Playwright, theatre director, actor, and educator; member of the Black Arts Movement and author of One Monkey Don't Stop No Show.	
Ed Bradley	1964	Former CBS News journalist of the program 60 Minutes	
Jim Vance	1964	Emmy Award-winning anchorman. Vance was inducted into the Journalists Hall of Fame.	
William "Billy" Joe	1970	Coach Joe won 237 career games in 31 years of coaching at Cheyney (1972-1978), Central State of Ohio and FAMU, trailing only legendary Eddie Robinson of Grambling State in black-college football wins (408). He was the Pennsylvania State Conference Coach of the Year in 1978. Coach Joe was also the running backs coach for the Philadelphia Eagles (1979-80). He helped mentor the Eagles to the 1980 Super Bowl. Coach Joe was also AFL Rookie of the Year with the Denver Broncos in 1963, and he was a member of New York Jets' Super Bowl winning team (1969)	
Jim Ellis	1972	The inspiration behind the hit Hollywood movie Pride starring Terrence Howard and Bernie Mac.	
Robert Bogle	1973	President/CEO of The Philadelphia Tribune, the oldest black newspaper in circulation today.	
Ronald S. Coleman	1973	Lieutenant General, Deputy Commandant for Manpower and Reserve Affairs for the United States Marine Corps; second three-star general of African-American heritage in the USMC.	
Michael Horsey	1975	Former State Representative for the 190th district in Philadelphia County, Pennsylvania.	
Levy Lee Simon	ca. 1983	Award-winning playwright.	
Andre Waters	1984	Former NFL player	
Randy Monroe	1987	Member of the Cheyney University Athletic Hall of Fame; current head coach of University of Maryland, Baltimore County men's basketball.	
Thaddeus Kirkland	1991	State Representative for the 159th district in Delaware County, Pennsylvania.	
James "Big Cat" Williams	ca. 1991	Former Chicago Bears player 1991-2002. He was an offensive right tackle eleven of his twelve years with the Bears, and played in the Pro Bowl.	
Dominique Curry	2009	Professional NFL player with the St. Louis Rams in 2010. Curry played three seasons of football and ran track and four seasons of basketball receiving his degree in Geographical Information Science in 2009.	
