= Patricia Aufderheide =

American public intellectual

Patricia A. Aufderheide
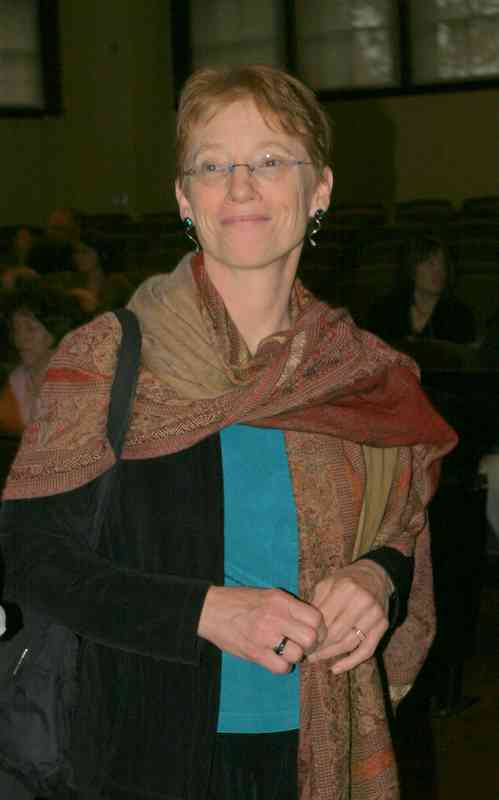
- Aufderheide at the Berkman Center 2006 Beyond Broadcast gathering
- Education: Ph.D. in history, University of Minnesota
- Occupations: University professor and legal scholar
- Employer(s): American University, Washington, D.C.
- Website: https://www.american.edu/soc/faculty/paufder.cfm

Patricia Ann Aufderheide is a scholar and public intellectual on media and social change, and an expert on fair use in media creation and scholarship. She is a university professor at American University in Washington, D.C., where she has worked since 1989. She founded and led the Center for Social Media in 2000, which in 2015 Caty Borum then led and renamed the Center for Media & Social Impact. She has received multiple awards and honors for her journalism and scholarship, including 2026 induction into the National Academy of Motion Picture Arts & Sciences’ Silver Circle for “significant and impactful contributions to the television industry,” the John Simon Guggenheim Memorial Fellowship in 1994, Fulbright Research Fellowships in 1995 (Brazil), 2017 (Australia) and 2024 (South Korea), and numerous journalism and career awards.

== Education and career ==
Aufderheide attended the University of Minnesota, where she received a Ph.D. in history, writing her dissertation on "Order and Violence: Social Deviance and Social Control in Brazil, 1780-1840".

She was a cultural editor at In These Times newspaper between 1978 and 1985, and a senior editor thereafter until 2025, when she became editor emerita. In 1981-82, she was a senior editor at American Film magazine. In 1985-86, she worked for the United Church of Christ Office of Communication, focused on public interest issues in telecommunication policy, and particularly the effects on working and poor people of telephone divestiture. Since 1989, she has taught at American University in Washington, D.C., where she became associate professor in 1994, full professor in 1998, and University Professor in 2009. She has been a visiting professor at University of Brasília, Duke University, University of Illinois at Chicago, the University of Minnesota, Queensland University of Technology, and Hankuk University of Foreign Studies.

== Publications ==
Aufderheide has authored books, including Kartemquin Films: Documentaries on the Frontlines of Democracy, Oxford Handbook on American Documentary (co-authored with Joshua Glick), Reclaiming Fair Use: How to Put Balance Back in Copyright (co-authored with Peter Jaszi), Documentary Film: A Very Short Introduction (first edition 2007, second edition 2026), Communication Policy and the Public Interest: The Telecommunications Act of 1996, and The Daily Planet: A Critic on the Capitalist Culture Beat.

She has published scores of academic journal articles, and has published prolifically as an arts journalist in publications ranging from major daily newspapers such as the Los Angeles Times, The Toronto Globe and Mail and the Boston Globe to cultural magazines such as Harper’s, Film Comment and Cineaste to partisan and issue publications such as The Nation, The Progressive and Mother Jones.

== Awards ==
In 2026, Aufderheide was inducted into the National Academy of Motion Picture Arts & Sciences’ Silver Circle for “significant and impactful contributions to the television industry.” Aufderheide received the John Simon Guggenheim Memorial Fellowship in 1994, followed by Fulbright Research Fellowships taken in 1995 (Brazil), 2017 (Australia), and 2024 (South Korea) and in 2017. She was the Scholar-Teacher of the Year at American University in the 2004-2005 school year. She received the Preservation and Scholarship award in 2006 from the International Documentary Association, a career achievement award in 2008 from the International Digital Media and Arts Association, the Woman of Vision Award from Women in Film and Video (DC) in 2010, and the George Stoney Award for Documentary from the University Film and Video Association in 2015.

== Public intellectual role ==
Both in her academic and journalistic work, Aufderheide’s work is marked by an ability to explain complex phenomena with clarity and vividness. In both spheres, her work is marked by interdisciplinary and collaborative process. In her academic work, for example, much of her research has been led by an understanding of what kind of empirically-grounded knowledge can be used to change or reinforce policies that support democratic process. For example, her research on public access cable programming that served the public good was originally conducted in association with pro bono lawyers for the national association of public access programmers, now the Alliance for Community Media. It was used in a legal challenge to the 1992 Cable Act, which was cited in a U.S. Supreme Court decision that eliminated a clause in the law threatening access cable’s future. Other examples follow.

On copyright, Aufderheide has examined how in which intellectual property law impacts the production, circulation, and consumption of media. She has argued, often in conjunction with Peter Jaszi, that the U.S. copyright doctrine of fair use is more available than many communities of practice currently make of it. Fair use is linked, in this argument, with free expression. Extensive research with a variety of communities of practice have demonstrated that link, as was documented in Reclaiming Fair Use, 2d ed. With Jaszi, and other collaborators including Meredith Jacob and Brandon Butler, Esq., she has coordinated successful efforts in more than a dozen communities of practice to articulate the best practices of a community on fair use. In each case, the facilitating team worked with national professional associations or groups, such as the International Documentary Association, the Association of Research Libraries, the Software Preservation Network, and the College Art Association to establish the professional group’s consensus around best practices in appropriately using the law to accomplish core mission for their profession. Those collaborative relationships also permitted further research on professional practices after asserting their best practices. Reclaiming Fair Use documented that when communities have employed these codes of best practices and, through them, learned about the availability of fair use, their ability to make work more efficiently and effectively has increased, expanding free expression. It also documented industry changes as a result of assertion of professional best practices in fair use; these included errors and omission insurance routinely accepting fair use claims.These results were not anticipated by critics of the position that Aufderheide and Jaszi took. Lawrence Lessig for instance has argued that fair use is too undependable to be a reliable balancing feature of copyright, and that encouraging people to use it distracts from the mission to reform copyright law. Jennifer E. Rothman has argued that codes of best practices could constrain employment of fair use. Both arguments were disproved by ensuing professional practices enabled by the fair use codes.

On media, Aufderheide has focused on both spaces and behaviors that foster exchange of public knowledge with the goal of resolving problems. In this she follows the argumentation of the American pragmatic philosopher John Dewey, who argued that the public exists to the extent people talk it into existence with others. S She also follows the cultural production analytic approach developed, partly in collaboration with movements for social justice, by scholar Stuart Hall. She has analyzed the American institutions of public television, cable access television, and DBS set-aside channels, as well as the evolution of social-issue documentary from earliest days to interactive documentary platforms.

Her work, both journalistic and academic, on independent filmmaking, as an example of storytelling for stronger democracy, has drawn upon and built relationships with organizations in the independent filmmaking community. Her institutional biography, Kartemquin Films: Documentaries on the Frontlines of Democracy, chronicles six decades of a Deweyan approach to documentary media production. Aufderheide was also a member of the larger Kartemquin Films community over decades, and eventually served on its board. Her work on documentary ethics led, among other things, to becoming a senior advisor to the effort that became the Archival Producers Alliance.

In public television, Aufderheide became a noted journalist on public television (in 1980 winning a Project Censored award for investigative journalism on U.S. public TV’s underwriting practices; the award is now defunct), and reported extensively in trade journals such as The Independent on independent filmmaking activists’ work that eventually resulted in the creation of the Independent Television Service (ITVS) in 1988. Aufderheide later served on the ITVS board of directors between 2000-2007 and 2013-2025. She also became an academic on the structure, policies and demographics of public TV, from a perspective of its role in serving the American public with reliable information with a range of perspectives reflecting the American population, models of civic engagement, and spaces for local community.

Under Aufderheide’s leadership, 2000-2014, the Center for Social Media (now the Center for Media & Social Impact) showcased strategies and techniques for making impactful social-issue documentaries, through screenings, filmmaker visits, and an annual conference, Media That Matters. It also conducted much research on public interest and media policies. Funding for the Center has been provided by [Annie E. Casey], MacArthur, McCormick, Surdna, and Rockefeller Foundations, the Haas Family Trusts (later Wyncote Foundation), and the [National Endowment for the Arts].

She has also consulted with foundations including the John D. and Catherine T. MacArthur and the Ford Foundations, and with media organizations such as the German international public television service Deutsche Welle.
