= Annette Fuentes =

American journalist

Annette Fuentes is an American journalist who writes regularly on health and social policy for The New York Times, The Nation, the Village Voice, The Progressive, and In These Times, where she is a contributing editor. Fuentes was also on the faculty of the Graduate School of Journalism at Columbia University. She is author of the 2011 book, 'Lockdown High; When the Schoolhouse becomes a Jailhouse'.

Fuentes is a member of the Board of Contributors for USA Today's Forum Page, part of the newspaper’s Opinion section.

She is co-author with Barbara Ehrenreich of Women in the Global Factory (1983).

In earlier years, Fuentes was the health and hospitals reporter at the New York Daily News, an assistant editor for op-eds at Newsday, the Metro editor at the Village Voice, and an editorial writer and columnist at El Diario/La Prensa, New York City's largest Spanish-language daily newspaper, Fuentes was also the editor of City Limits (New York magazine), a monthly covering housing and community development.
