= Miles Harvey =

American journalist and author

Miles Harvey (born 1960) is an American author of three works of nonfiction, The Island of Lost Maps, Painter in a Savage Land and The King of Confidence. He also wrote a collection of short stories, The Registry of Forgotten Objects, and a play "How Long Will I Cry," which premiered at the Steppenwolf Theatre in Chicago.

== Early life and education ==
Harvey grew up in the Chicago suburb of Downers Grove. His father, Robert Harvey, was an elementary-school teacher and political activist. His mother, Kathryn "Tinker" Harvey, was the longtime chairman of the Democratic Party of DuPage County, who twice served as a member of the United States Electoral College and was a delegate or alternate delegate to five Democratic National Conventions.

Harvey graduated from Downers Grove Community High School North in 1978. After a year at Southern Illinois University, he transferred to the University of Illinois Urbana-Champaign, where he studied journalism, graduating in 1984. At his college newspaper, The Daily Illini, fellow staff members included Larry Doyle, who later became a writer and producer for The Simpsons and a frequent contributor to The New Yorker; Dave Cullen, who went on to write the nonfiction bestseller Columbine; Kevin Davis, whose books would include The Brain Defense and Defending the Damned; and Jon Ginoli, who soon gained renown as singer and guitarist for Pansy Division, a pioneering band in the queercore movement of punk rock.

In 1991, Harvey received a Master of Fine Arts in English at the University of Michigan, where he studied fiction-writing under the novelists Charles Baxter and Nicholas Delabanco.

== Writing career ==
Harvey worked for United Press International, In These Times and Outside. While at Outside he wrote a 1997 story on modern-day map thief Gilbert Bland, which was the origin for The Island of Lost Maps. Part true-crime narrative, part meditation the allure of maps, the book became a national and international bestseller.

In 2008, Harvey published his second book, Painter in a Savage Land: The Strange Saga of the First European Artist in North America. This is a non-fiction work that chronicles Jacques Le Moyne de Morgues's adventures with the French expedition to Florida led by Jean Ribault during the sixteenth century. The book received largely positive reviews. Entertainment Weekly described it as a "rip-roaring account of Le Moyne's adventures," adding that "it's a testament to Harvey's research and style that he can powerfully evoke a man about whom so few documentary traces remain."

In 2020, Harvey published a third non-fiction book, The King of Confidence, which tells the story of James J. Strang, a 19th-century con man / prophet who led hundreds of followers to an island on Lake Michigan, where he declared himself "king of earth and heaven." A longlist honoree for the Andrew Carnegie Medal for Excellence in Nonfiction and for the Chautauqua Prize, the book was named a New York Times Book Review Editors' Choice.

Harvey's work of fiction, The Registry of Forgotten Objects: Stories, was published in 2024. Booklist gave the collection a starred review, describing it as "lustrous with unruly passion, strange impulses, untenable loss and the dogged pursuit of solace... Harvey has created an intricately spun, deeply illuminating web of wondrously uncanny and compassionate stories."

Harvey also plays an active role in Big Shoulders Books, a nonprofit, social-justice publishing company he co-founded in 2011 with fellow DePaul University creative-writing professors Chris Solis Green and Michele Morano. He has edited two volumes for this press: The Garcia Boy: A Memoir, by the late essayist Rafael Torch, and How Long Will I Cry, a series of oral-history narratives about gun violence that Harvey and his students collected in 2011 and 2012 while more than 900 people were being murdered on the streets of Chicago. Harvey also turned these oral histories into a documentary-theater piece, also called "How Long Will I Cry", which premiered at the Steppenwolf Theatre in 2013.

Harvey has previously taught creative writing at Northwestern University, the University of Chicago and LSU New Orleans. Since 2009, he has been a professor at DePaul University of Chicago, where he is the chair of the Department of English and director of the DePaul Publishing Institute.

== Works ==
- Harvey, Miles (2000). The Island of Lost Maps: A True Story of Cartographic Crime. Random House. ISBN 0-375-50151-7.
- Harvey, Miles (2008). Painter in a Savage Land:The Strange Saga of the First European Artist in North America. Random House. ISBN 978-1-4000-6120-4.
- Harvey, Miles (2020). The King of Confidence: A Tale of Utopian Dreamers, Frontier Schemers, True Believers, False Prophets, and the Murder of an American Monarch. Little, Brown & Company. ISBN 978-0316463591.
- Harvey, Miles (2024). The Registry of Forgotten Objects: Stories. Mad Creek Books. ISBN 978-0814259146.
