= Gabriel Kolko =

American historian (1932–2014)

- Born: August 17, 1932; Paterson, New Jersey, United States
- Died: May 19, 2014 (aged 81); Amsterdam, Netherlands
- Education: Kent State University (BA; 1954); University of Wisconsin (MS; 1955); Harvard University (PhD; 1962)
- Occupations: Historian, writer, educator
- Spouse: Joyce Manning (m. 1955; died 2012)
- Writing career
- Language: English
- Period: 1955–2014 (writer)
- Genre: History
- Subjects: Progressive Era, Vietnam War, Corporate liberalism
- Notable works: The Triumph of Conservatism, The Limits of Power (co-author w/ Joyce Kolko)
- Notable awards: Transportation History Prize from Organization of American Historians, 1963; Social Sciences Research Council fellow, 1963–64; Guggenheim fellow, 1966–67; American Council of Learned Societies fellow, 1971–72; Killam fellow, 1974–75, 1982–84; Royal Society of Canada fellow.
- Movements: Historical revisionism New Left

Gabriel Morris Kolko (August 17, 1932 – May 19, 2014) was an American New Left historian. His research interests included American capitalism and political history, the Progressive Era, and U.S. foreign policy in the 20th century. One of the best-known revisionist historians to write about the Cold War, he was also credited as "an incisive critic of the Progressive Era and its relationship to the American empire." U.S. historian Paul Buhle summarized Kolko's career when he described him as "a major theorist of what came to be called Corporate Liberalism...[and] a very major historian of the Vietnam War and its assorted war crimes."

== Background and education ==
Kolko was of Jewish heritage. He was born in Paterson, New Jersey, the son of two teachers: Philip and Lillian (née Zadikow) Kolko. Kolko attended Kent State University, studying American economic history (BA 1954). Next he attended the University of Wisconsin, where he studied American social history (MS 1955) and was taught by William Appleman Williams. He received his PhD from Harvard University in 1962.

During these years, Kolko was active in the Student League for Industrial Democracy (SLID). By the time SLID published his first pamphlet, Distribution of Income in the United States, in 1955, Kolko had already completed a stint as the league's national vice chairman. Following his graduation from Harvard, he taught at the University of Pennsylvania and at SUNY-Buffalo. In 1970, he joined the history department of York University in Toronto, remaining an emeritus professor of history there until his death in 2014.

== Career ==
According to antiwar activist Eric Garris, Kolko first established his reputation as a historian writing about the "close connection between the government and big business throughout the Progressive Era and the Cold War [...] but broke new ground with his analysis of the corporate elite's successful defeat of the free market by corporatism." Early in his career, beginning with his books The Triumph of Conservatism and Railroads and Regulation, Kolko used a revisionist approach as a way of analyzing history. Soon he was considered a leading historian of the New Left, joining William Appleman Williams and James Weinstein in advancing the so-called "corporate liberalism" thesis in American historiography.

This was a thesis that disputed the "widely held view that government regulates business, arguing that, instead, business steers government", and Kolko used it to analyze how America's social, economic, and political life was shaped beginning with the Progressive Era (1900–1920). But for Kolko, a social policy of "corporate liberalism" (or what Kolko preferred to call "political capitalism") shaped the mainstream agenda of all that was to follow afterwards in American society, from The New Deal (1930s) through to the post-World War II era of the Cold War (1947–1962), and onwards. Kolko's argument that public policy was shaped by "corporate control of the liberal agenda" (rather than the liberal control of the corporate agenda), revised the old Progressive Era historiography of the "interests" versus the "people", which was now to be reinterpreted as a collaboration of "interests" and "people." So too, with this revised version of recent American history, came the tacit recognition that this fulfilled the business community's unspoken, but deliberate, aim of stabilizing competition in the "free market."

This was an idea summarized by journalist and internet columnist Charles Burris when he argued that:

Rather than "the people" being behind these "progressive reforms", it was the very elite business interests themselves responsible, in an attempt to cartelize, centralize and control what was impossible due to the dynamics of a competitive and decentralized economy.

In retrospect, Kolko summarized this phase of his career when he wrote that:

"As I have argued elsewhere, American "progressivism" was a part of a big business effort to attain protection from the unpredictability of too much competition, [See my book The Triumph of Conservatism: A Reinterpretation of American History, 1900-1916, New York, 1962].

Kolko argued that big business turned to the government for support because of its inefficiency and inability to prevent the economy veering between boom and bust, which aroused fears that the concomitant discontent amongst the general public would lead to the imposition of popular constraints upon business. Its embrace of government led to their intertwinement, with business becoming the dominant strand.

=== Historian of the Progressive Era ===
Kolko's thesis 'that businessmen favored government regulation because they feared competition and desired to forge a government–business coalition' is one that is echoed by many observers today.

— Eric Garris

Kolko, in particular, broke new ground with his critical history of the Progressive Era. He suggested that free enterprise and competition were vibrant and expanding during the first two decades of the 20th century; thereafter, however, "the corporate elite—the House of Morgan, for example—turned to government intervention when it realized in the waning 19th century that competition was too unruly to guarantee market share." This behavior is known as corporatism, but Kolko preferred political capitalism, "the merger of the economic and political structures on behalf of the greater interests of capitalism". Kolko's thesis "that businessmen favored government regulation because they feared competition and desired to forge a government–business coalition" is one that is echoed by many observers today. Former Harvard professor Paul H. Weaver uncovered the same inefficient and bureaucratic behavior from corporations during his stint at Ford Motor Corporation. Free market economist Murray Rothbard thought highly of Kolko's work on the history of relations between big business and government. As one profile, published in The American Conservative, put it:

For Gabriel Kolko, the enemy has always been what sociologist Max Weber called "political capitalism"—that is, "the accumulation of private capital and fortunes via booty connected with politics." In Kolko's eyes, "America's capacity and readiness to intervene virtually anywhere" pose a grave danger both to the U.S. and the world. Kolko has made it his mission to study the historical roots of how this propensity for intervention came to be. He was also one of the first historians to take on the regulatory state in a serious way. Kolko's landmark work, The Triumph of Conservatism, is an attempt to link the Progressive Era policies of Theodore Roosevelt to the national-security state left behind in the wake of his cousin Franklin's presidency. Kolko's indictment of what he calls "conservatism" is not aimed at the Southern Agrarianism of Richard Weaver or the Old Right individualism of Albert Jay Nock. In fact, Kolko's thesis—that big government and big business consistently colluded to regulate small American artisans and farmers out of existence—has much in common with libertarian and traditionalist critiques of the corporatist state. The "national progressivism" that Kolko attacks was, in his own words, "the defense of business against the democratic ferment that was nascent in the states." Coming of age in the '50s and '60s, Kolko saw firsthand the destruction of the "permanent things" as the result of the merging of Washington, D.C., and Wall Street. A sense of place and rootedness lingers just beneath the surface of his work.

=== Historian of U.S. foreign relations and the Vietnam War ===
Having published on the US domestic scene, Kolko next turned to matters international, beginning in 1968 with The Politics of War, "the most thorough and extensive of the 'revisionist' views of American foreign policy during World War II." Next came The Roots of American Foreign Policy (1969), a book that, according to Richard H. Immerman, "became must reading for a generation of diplomatic historians." In this work, Kolko contended that the American failure to win the Vietnam War demonstrated the inapplicability of the US policy of containment. The Limits of Power (1972), co-authored with his wife, Joyce, looked at US foreign policy in the crucial postwar years, when American power was at its peak, one without historical precedent. Limits is described by The Cambridge History of the Cold War (2010), as "[a]mong the most important analyses of US policy and the origins of the Cold War". "Even among more traditionally-minded scholars," noted one unsympathetic historian, "the Kolkos have been credited with considerable insight and praised for the breadth of their research." Arch-traditionalist John Lewis Gaddis, for example, conceded that The Limits of Power was "an important book."

Kolko next moved on to his country's war in Vietnam, a conflagration with which he and Joyce were deeply preoccupied at home and abroad; the couple were in Huế when North Vietnamese forces entered Saigon, and were granted the privilege of announcing the event over local radio. Kolko would publish two books on the Vietnam War and its aftermath. Anatomy of a War (1985) looked at the war itself, its prologue and its effects. Anatomy would place its author alongside the likes of George Kahin as a leading writer of the postrevisionist, or synthesis, school. This group of historians suggested, among other things, that the revisionist school was wrong in speculating that the United States could have won the war. In Anatomy, Kolko became "the first American historian to establish a distinction between Diệm and Thiệu, on the one hand, and the population of the Saigon milieu on the other. It might even be said that he was the first to insist that there was such a milieu and to attempt a systematic study of its inhabitants." One sympathetic reviewer notes that Kolko's work on Vietnam has been relegated to the margins of the Vietnam War literature. Vietnam: Anatomy of a Peace (1997) cast a look back at developments in Vietnam in the wake of the war, and how the Vietnamese communists ran the country. Kolko's assessment of their efforts was rather less than positive.

Kolko became a founding editor of the Journal of Contemporary Asia in 1970, remaining on the board until 1998.

Kolko was not without his critics. Gaddis Smith once described him, along with Williams, as at "the forefront of revisionist scholars" and yet "essentially pamphleteers". Others said his leftist political sympathies had a "distorting" effect on his work.

== Political views ==
Kolko was a self-declared leftist and an anticapitalist. Nonetheless, Kolko's revisionist historical accounts gained favor with several libertarian capitalists from the United States, often to the chagrin of Kolko, who, at least as late as 1973, actively tried to distance himself from connections to that particular strain of libertarian thinking as it developed in the US.

Regarding socialism, Kolko wrote in After Socialism (2006) that, both as theory and as movement, it is "essentially dead," its analysis and practice have both been failures, and it "simply inherited most of the nineteenth century's myopia, adding to the illusions of social thought". He maintained, however, that capitalism is neither a rational nor a stable basis for a peaceful society: "Given its practice and consequences, opposition to what is loosely termed capitalism—the status quo in all its dimensions—is far more justified today than ever. Precisely because of this, a more durable and effective alternative to capitalism is even more essential."

As sociologist Frank Furedi has argued: "[Kolko's] scathing condemnation of American foreign policy, like his condemnation of the crudity of Maoist rhetoric, stand as a testimony to his intellectual and political integrity." Georgetown historian David S. Painter similarly wrote that "while very critical of Marxist and Communist movements and regimes, Kolko also counts among the human, social, and economic costs of capitalism the 'repeated propensity' of capitalist states to go to war." Kolko was a strong supporter of North Vietnam, but he was opposed to Lenin and Stalin and was scathingly dismissive of Mao Zedong and his thinking.

Kolko regarded the result of the creation of Israel as "abysmal". In his view, Zionism produced "a Sparta that traumatized an already artificially divided region," "a small state with a military ethos that pervades all aspects of [it]s culture, its politics and, above all, its response to the existence of Arabs in its midst and at its borders." Overall, his conclusion was that there is "simply no rational reason" that justifies Israel's creation.

"The US has never been able to translate its superior arms into political success, and that decisive failure is inherent in everything it attempts," remarked Kolko in the context of the Iraq War, just after George W. Bush's Mission Accomplished speech. He predicted that Iraq's "regionalism and internecine ethnic strife will produce years of instability." Similarly for Afghanistan: "As in Vietnam, the US will win battles, but it has no strategy for winning this war."

== Personal life ==
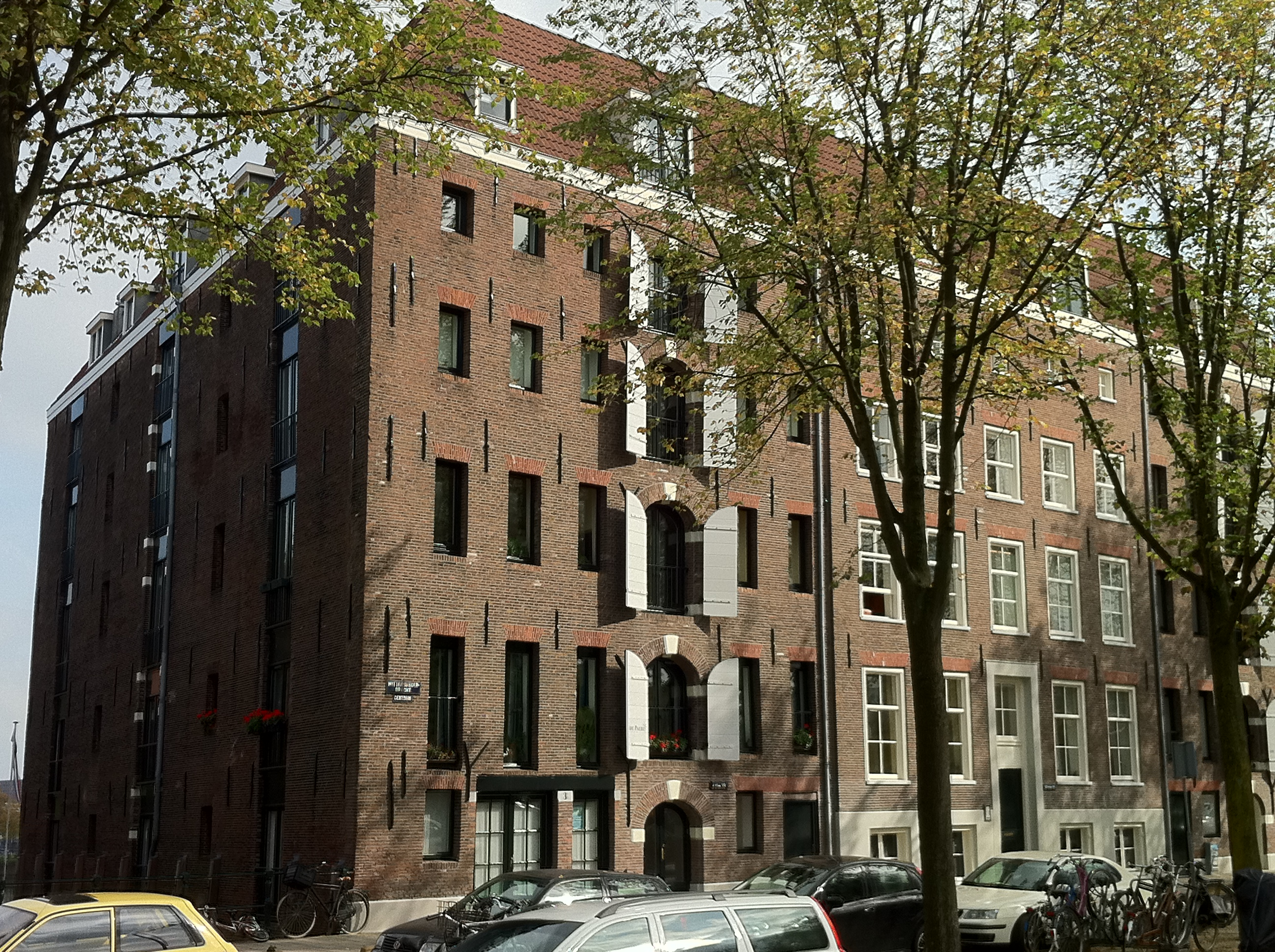
Warehouse where Kolko lived

Kolko married Joyce Manning in 1955, and the couple remained together until her death in 2012. She had been a collaborator in his writings, such as The Limits of Power. Upon retirement, Kolko emigrated to Amsterdam, where he had a home and continued to work on his historical assessments of modern warfare, particularly the Vietnam War. He was a regular contributor to the political newsletter CounterPunch during the final 15 years of his life. He was interested in mycology and a fan of Giovanni Kapsperger.

Kolko died aged 81 at his home in Amsterdam at Oostelijke Eilanden on May 19, 2014. He was suffering from a degenerative neurological disorder and chose euthanasia, permitted under Dutch law. He left a considerable amount of money to the Nederlandse Bachvereniging.

== Selected publications ==
- Distribution of Income in the United States. New York, NY: Student League for Industrial Democracy. 1955.
- Wealth and Power in America: An Analysis of Social Class and Income Distribution. New York, NY: Praeger. 1962.
- The Triumph of Conservatism: A Reinterpretation of American History, 1900-1916. New York, NY: The Free Press. 1963.
- Railroads and Regulation, 1877–1916. Princeton, NJ: Princeton University Press. 1965. Based on his PhD dissertation.
- The Politics of War: The World and United States Foreign Policy, 1943–1945 (rep. with new afterword ed.). New York, NY: Random House. 1990 [1968]. ISBN 9780679727576.
- The Roots of American Foreign Policy: An Analysis of Power and Purpose. Boston, MA: Beacon Press. 1969.
- Richard Falk; Robert Jay Lifton, eds. (1971). Crimes of War: A Legal, Political-Documentary, and Psychological Inquiry into the Responsibility of Leaders, Citizens, and Soldiers for Criminal Acts in Wars. New York, NY: Random House. ISBN 9780394414157.
- Joyce Kolko (1972). The Limits of Power: The World and United States Foreign Policy, 1945–1954. New York,&: Harper & Row.
- Main Currents in Modern American History. New York, NY: Harper & Row. 1976.
- Anatomy of a War: Vietnam, the United States, and the Modern Historical Experience (rep. with new afterword ed.). New York, NY: The New Press. 1994 [1985].
- Confronting the Third World: United States Foreign Policy, 1945–1980. New York, NY: Pantheon Books. 1988.
- Century of War: Politics, Conflicts, and Society since 1914. New York, NY: The New Press. 1994.
- Vietnam: Anatomy of a Peace. London and New York, NY: Routledge. 1997.
- Another Century of War?. New York, NY: The New Press. 2002.
- The Age of War: The United States Confronts the World. Boulder, CO: Lynne Rienner Publishers. 2006.
- After Socialism: Reconstructing Critical Social Thought. Abingdon: Routledge. 2006.
- World in Crisis: The End of the American Century. London: Pluto Press. 2009.
