= Radical Society =

American political magazine

Radical Society: A Review of Culture and Politics was a quarterly left-wing political and cultural magazine published in the United States by Radical Society, Ltd. The editor-in-chief was Timothy Don. It was established in 1970 as Socialist Revolution, was renamed as Socialist Review in 1978, and obtained its final title at the end of 2002.

== History ==
Socialist Revolution, under its founding editor James Weinstein, began with a revolutionary perspective which was, however, very critical of the existing Marxist left (including the New Communist Movement as well as established organizations), which it saw as undemocratic both in its way of operating and in its political aspirations. In the 1970s and early 1980s, the magazine was strongly associated with the New American Movement (which in 1983 would merge with another organization to become the Democratic Socialists of America) and its politics in this period developed in a similar direction towards a more Social Democratic perspective. In the course of this development the magazine was renamed Socialist Review in 1978, meanwhile absorbing the short-lived Marxist Perspectives.

Among the magazine's editors have been Eli Zaretsky, David Plotke, Jeffrey Escoffier, Leslie Kauffman, and David Trend.

Because the magazine had been founded in San Francisco with an editorial collective that included many University of California at Berkeley graduate students, it showed an openness to theory that was not universally shared by magazines on the left in the 1970s. As some of the original collective graduated and got teaching jobs in the Boston area, a second editorial collective was founded in nearby Somerville (and later a short-lived New York collective also came into existence for similar reasons). As the members of the Boston collective began to get tenure, the nature of the two main editorial collectives began to diverge, with the Boston Collective attracting junior faculty, while the Bay Area collective continued well into the 1980s to be composed primarily of graduate students and community activists. The Boston Collective was notable for the quality of its economic analysis, while the West Coast Collective was active in producing articles out of the various identity movements of the 1980s, always with an eye toward theory. During this period, a careful reader could tell exactly which collective was responsible for which articles in the magazine, but to most observers it meant that Socialist Review reflected the diversity of positions available on the left.

Socialist Review came to be strongly associated with postmodern critical theory and evolved into a magazine with a strong cultural element. In 1991, Unfinished Business: 20 Years of Socialist Review, containing a collection of 20 articles was published.

In 2002 the magazine's name was changed again, to Radical Society: A Review of Culture and Politics. From 2002 to 2003 it was published by Routledge. As of 2006, an independent publisher, Radical Society Ltd., took over publishing and relaunched its website, making a small selection of past issues available online.

As of the end of 2006, the editor-in-chief of Radical Society was Timothy Don. The magazine has since ceased publication.

A substantial archive of Socialist Review's editorial correspondence, manuscripts, and records was acquired by the Paley Library of Temple University in the 1990s. It is housed in the library's Contemporary Culture Collection.

== Purpose and mission ==
In the first issue or Radical Society, the editors wrote that the inspirations for the journal were "both old and new--from The Masses and Emma Goldman's Mother Earth to the Harlem Renaissance and the Paris Commune, from the end of the cold war to the beginnings of a new global justice movement".
