= Julian Abele =

American architect (1881–1950)

Julian F. Abele
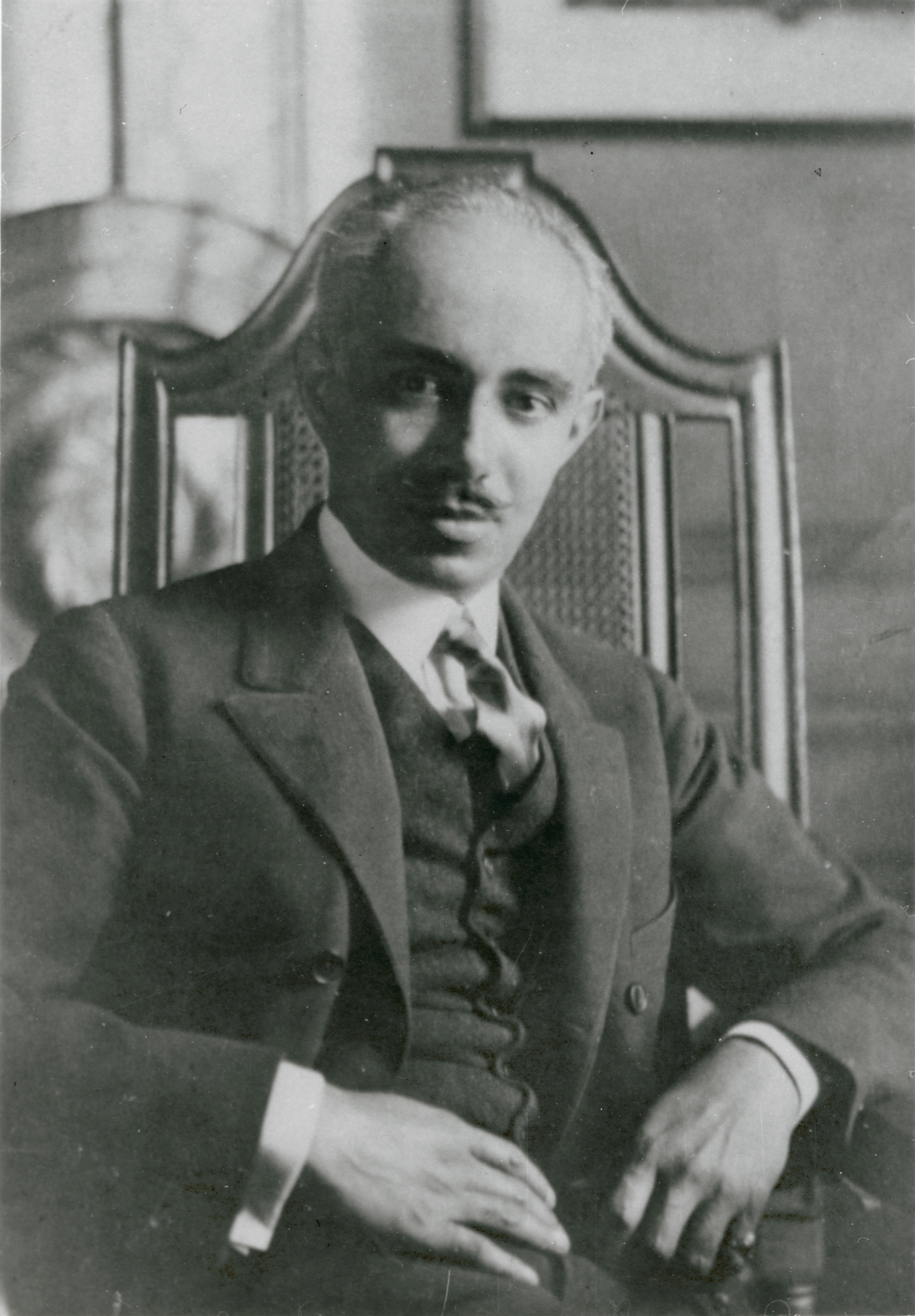
- Julian Abele (photo Duke University Archives)
- Born: Julian Francis Abele; April 30, 1881; Philadelphia, Pennsylvania, U.S.
- Died: April 23, 1950 (aged 68); Philadelphia, Pennsylvania, U.S.
- Education: Cheyney University (1896); Pennsylvania Museum School of Industrial Art (PMSIA; 1898); University of Pennsylvania, (B.A., Architecture, 1902)
- Occupation: architect
- Notable work: Duke University West Campus; Duke University Chapel; Cameron Indoor Stadium; Allen Administrative Building (completed after his death)
- Spouse: Marguerite Bulle (m. 1925)
- Children: 3
- Relatives: Absalom Jones (first Black Episcopal priest); Julian Abele Cook Jr. (federal judge)

Julian Francis Abele (April 30, 1881 – April 23, 1950) was a prominent American architect, and, for decades, the chief designer in the offices of Horace Trumbauer in Philadelphia, Pennsylvania. Abele, a prolific architect, was either lead designer or contributed to the design of more than 400 buildings. The fact that he was an African-American makes his story even more remarkable for the late 19th and early 20th centuries. His commissions included such notable works as the Widener Memorial Library at Harvard University (1912–1915), Philadelphia's Central Library (1917–1927), and the Philadelphia Museum of Art (1914–1928).

The University of Pennsylvania credits Abele as the primary designer of Eisenlohr Hall (1910–1911), the official residence of its presidents.

Abele was the primary designer of the west campus of Duke University in Durham, North Carolina (1924–1954). His contributions to the Trumbauer firm were great, but the only building for which Abele claimed authorship during Trumbauer's lifetime was Duke Memorial Chapel (1930–1935). Following Trumbauer's 1938 death, Abele co-headed the architectural firm and designed additional buildings at Duke, including Allen Administrative Building and Cameron Indoor Stadium.

== Background ==
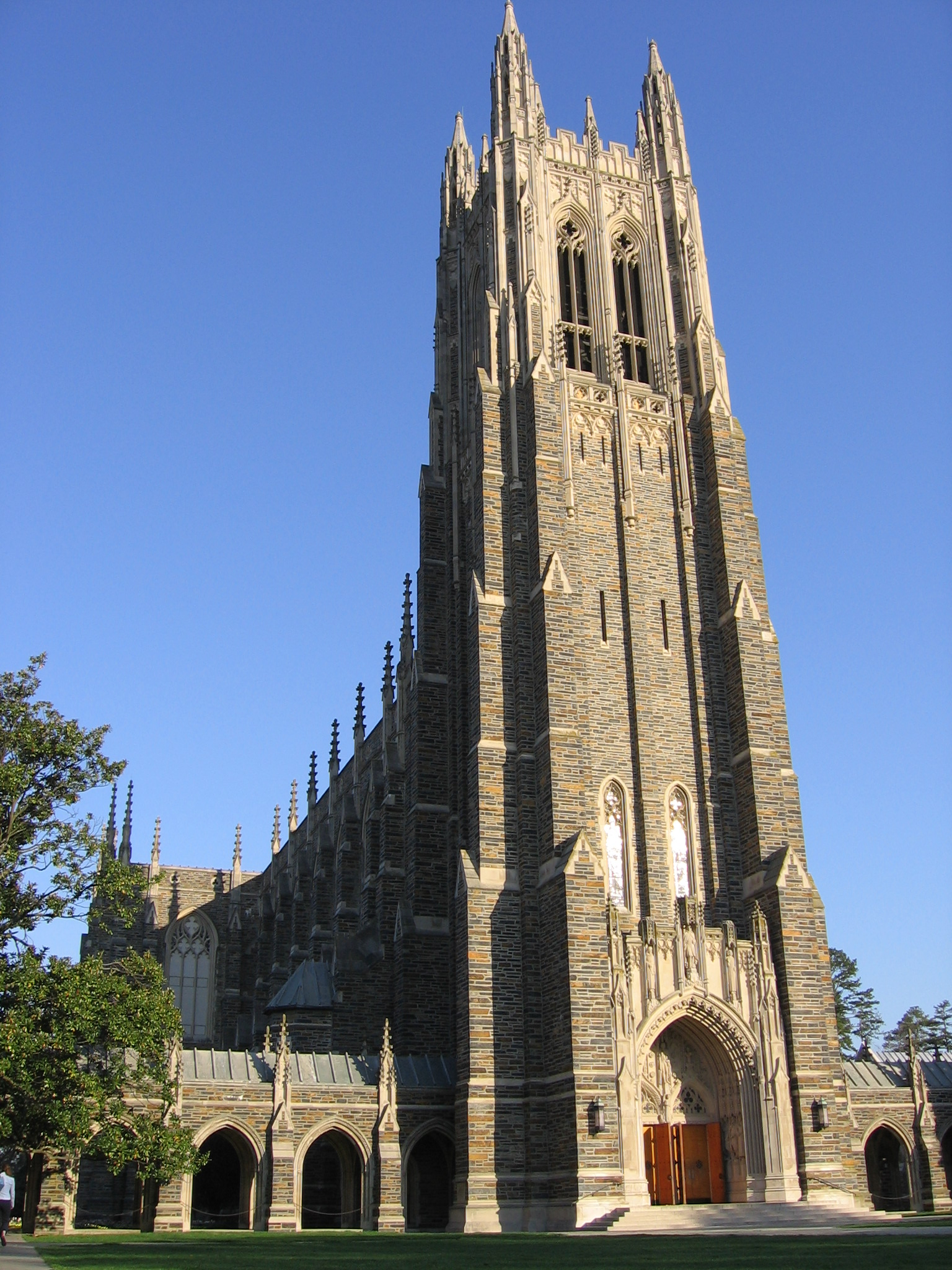
Duke Memorial Chapel (1930–1935)

Abele was born in Philadelphia to a prominent family. His maternal grandfather was Robert Jones, who in the late 18th century founded the city's Lombard Street Central Presbyterian Church. He was also related to Absalom Jones, who established the African Episcopal Church of St. Thomas in 1794, the first Black Episcopal congregation in the United States. Abele's son, Julian Francis Abele Jr. was an architectural engineer and his nephew, Julian Abele Cook, worked as the Building Coordinator for Howard University.

Abele worked in many media: watercolor, lithography, etching and pencil, wood, iron, gold and silver. He designed and constructed all of his own furniture, even doing the petit point himself. While he knew many historic styles, he seemed to love Louis XIV French most of all.

== Education ==
Abele attended the Quaker-run Institute for Colored Youth, which later became Cheyney University, where he excelled in mathematics and was chosen to deliver the commencement address. In 1898, he completed a two-year architectural drawing course at the Pennsylvania Museum School of Industrial Art (PMSIA, the now defunct University of the Arts).

Abele was the first Black student admitted to the Department of Architecture at the University of Pennsylvania. This achievement was all the more noteworthy for the restrictions Black students faced at the university, including not being allowed to live in dormitories or dine in the school's cafeteria. On projects assigned to pairs of students, he partnered with Louis Magaziner, the only Jewish student in the department, who also faced discrimination. This was the beginning of a lifelong friendship between the two.

Abele won a 1901 student competition to design a Beaux Arts pedestrian gateway. His submission was in the form of an exedra – a curved bench flanked by piers, but with steps passing through its center. This became his first commission when it was built on the campus of Haverford College. The Edward B. Conklin Memorial Gate (c.1901) stands at the Railroad Avenue entrance to the college. He was widely respected among his peers, earning the nickname "Willing and Able", and also won student awards for his designs for a post office and a museum of botany. He was elected president of the university's Architectural Society in year.

Abele became the University of Pennsylvania architecture department's first Black graduate in 1902. He worked part-time for a local architect and attend evening classes at the Pennsylvania Academy of the Fine Arts. Under the financial sponsorship of Philadelphia architect Horace Trumbauer, he traveled through France and Italy, an experience that was to influence his design work throughout his life.

=== École des Beaux-Arts ===
Between 1903 and his hiring by Horace Trumbauer in 1906, Abele traveled throughout Europe. His descendants contend that he studied at the École des Beaux-Arts in Paris during this stay, but Sandra L. Tatman, co-author of The Biographical Dictionary of Philadelphia Architects, 1700-1930, found no record of Abele having been enrolled at the École. She suggests that he may have informally sat in on the school's atelier. Tatman also notes that Abele listed travel to France, Italy, England, Germany, Switzerland, and Spain on his membership application to the American Institute of Architects (AIA), but not study at the École des Beaux-Arts.

== Career ==
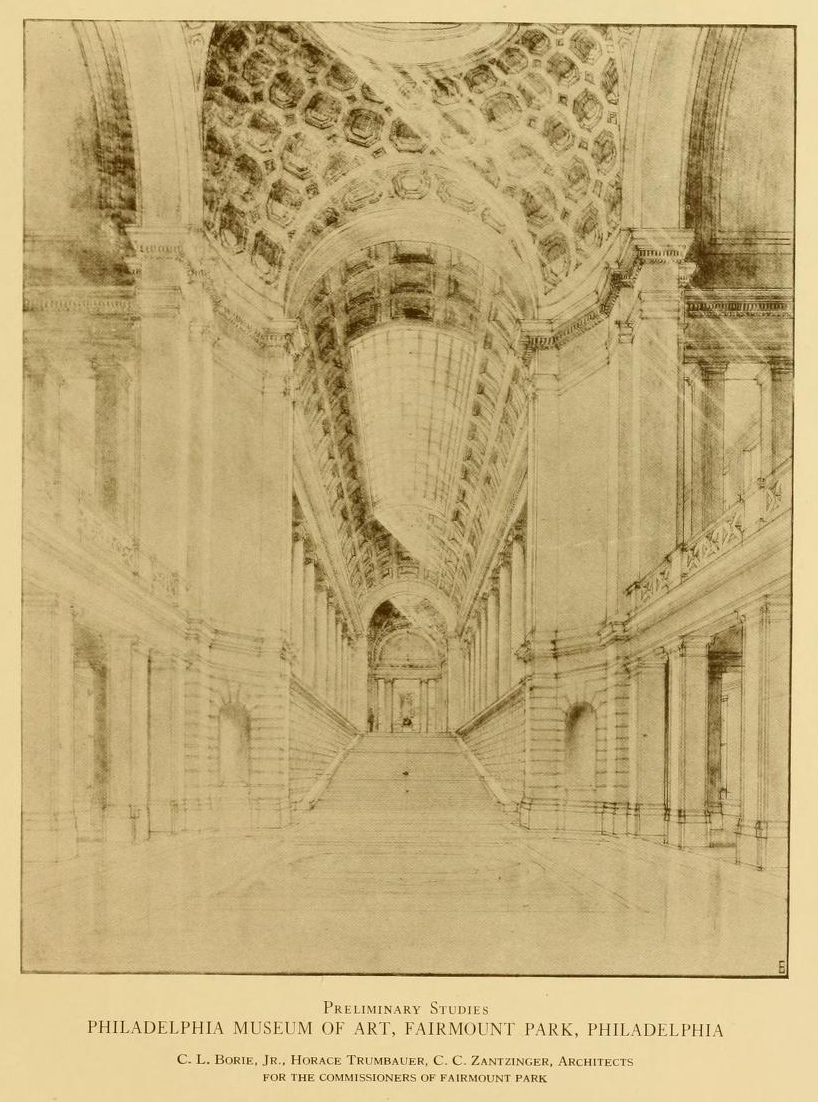
Preliminary study for the Philadelphia Museum of Art (1916), possibly drawn by Abele

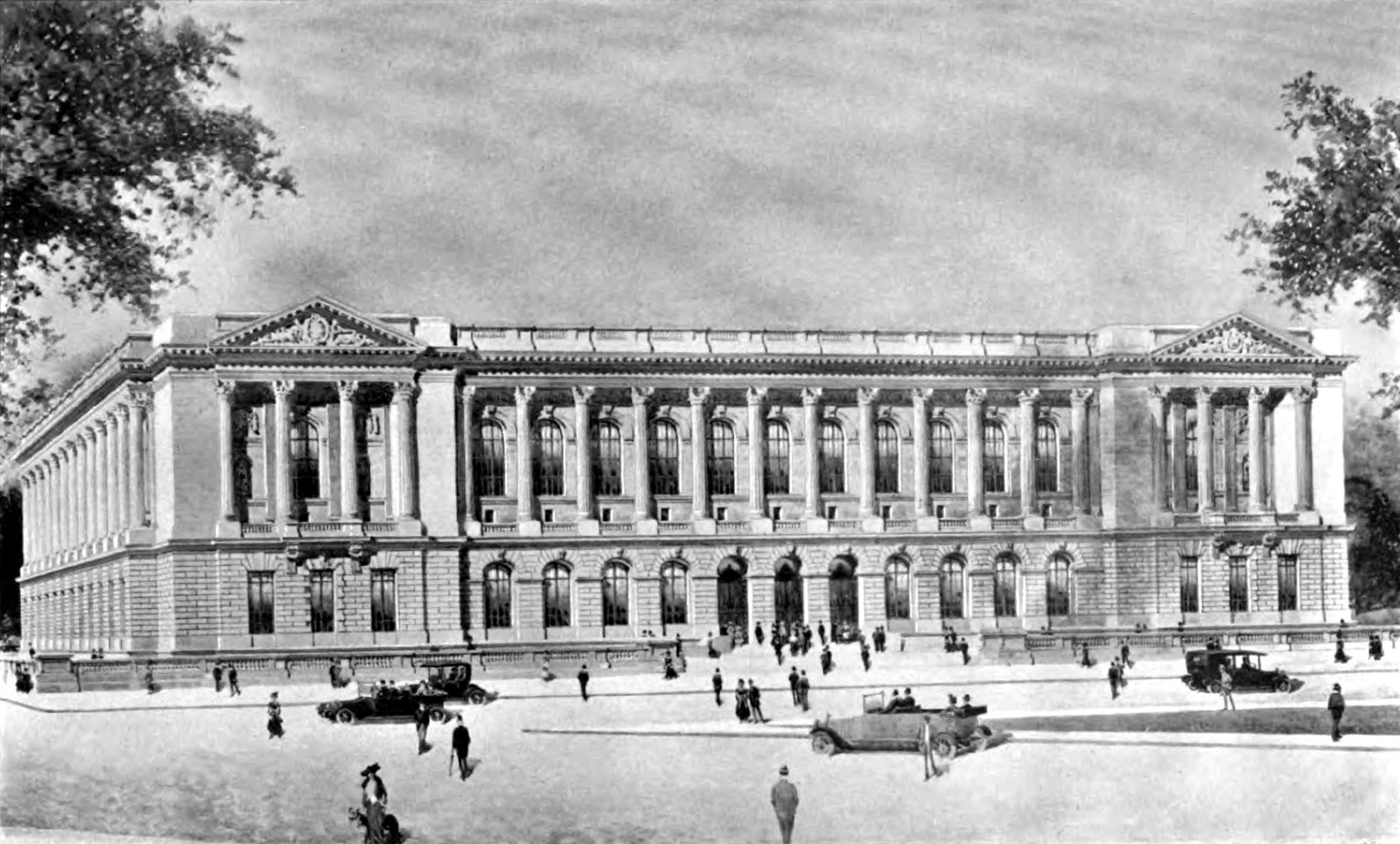
Presentation drawing (1918) for the Free Library of Philadelphia. Although unsigned, this appears to be drawn by Abele.

Following graduation from the University of Pennsylvania in 1902, Abele traveled west to Spokane, Washington, where he designed a house for his sister, Elizabeth Abele Cook. Abele spent a couple years in Europe before joining the Trumbauer firm in 1906, as assistant to chief designer Frank Seeburger. When Seeburger left the firm in 1909, Abele advanced to chief designer. Abele's stature within the firm was no secret; he was the second-highest paid employee. He was an architect.

Art historian David B. Brownlee studied the 14-year effort to design and build the Philadelphia Museum of Art, 1914–28. He credits Trumbauer architect Howell Lewis Shay with the museum's plan and massing, but notes that the final perspective drawings are in Abele's distinctive hand. Brownlee credits design of the exterior terracing, the cascade of waterfalls, and the front steps celebrated in the 1976 film Rocky, to Abele.

Abele was also the architect for Eisenlohr Hall, 1910–11, which serves as the residence of the president of the University of Pennsylvania on the Penn campus.

Following Trumbauer's death in 1938, the firm continued until 1950 under the name "Office of Horace Trumbauer," co-headed by Abele and William O. Frank. Commissions were hard to come by during The Depression and World War II, but the firm completed Duke Indoor Stadium at Duke University in 1940, and later made additions to Duke's Library (1948) and designed Duke's Allen Administrative Building (1954).

When Abele joined the American Institute of Architects in 1942, Philadelphia Museum of Art director Fiske Kimball called him "one of the most sensitive designers in America". Smithsonian Magazine described him, in a career retrospective, as "probably the most accomplished [Black architect] of his era."

Despite being the primary designer of Duke University, Abele was refused accommodations at a Durham hotel during a visit to campus. Although it was not until 1988 that a portrait of him was displayed at the university, the main quad at Duke University is now officially named Abele Quad with a dedication plaque prominently placed at the busiest spot on campus.

== Personal life ==
In 1925, at age 44, Abele married Marguerite Bulle, a French pianist 20 years his junior. They had three children: Julian Abele Jr., Marguerite Marie Abele (died young), and Nadia Boulanger Abele. Marguerite left him in 1936, to become the common-law wife of opera singer Jozef Kowalewski, with whom she had three additional children. Because Abele never took action to divorce his wife, his children and Kowalewski's children shared equally in his estate.

Abele died from a heart attack in 1950, in Philadelphia. He is interred at Eden Cemetery in Collingdale, Pennsylvania.

== Legacy ==
- The Allen Administration Building at Duke University, designed by Abele, was completed following his 1950 death. In 1988, Duke University posthumously honored Abele with a portrait that hangs in the building's main lobby. This was the first portrait of an African-American to be displayed on campus.
- On August 17, 2012, construction began on Julian Abele Park, at 22nd & Carpenter Streets in Philadelphia.
- To prominently acknowledge his contribution to Duke University's West Campus, the main quad at Duke was officially named Abele Quad in 2016. A dedication plaque was placed at the very center of west campus that he designed.
- Architectural historian Dreck Spurlock Wilson is preparing the first biography of Abele.
- Abele's great-nephew, attorney Julian Abele Cook Jr. (1930–2017), was nominated to a federal judgeship in the United States District Court for the Eastern District of Michigan in 1978, by President Jimmy Carter.
- Abele's great-great-nephew, Peter D. Cook (b. 1963), is a Washington, D.C. architect who collaborated on the design of the Smithsonian Institutionʼs National Museum of African American History and Culture. President Joseph Biden appointed Cook to the United States Commission of Fine Arts in 2021. The American Institute of Architects elected Cook to its College of Fellows in 2022.

=== Gallery ===
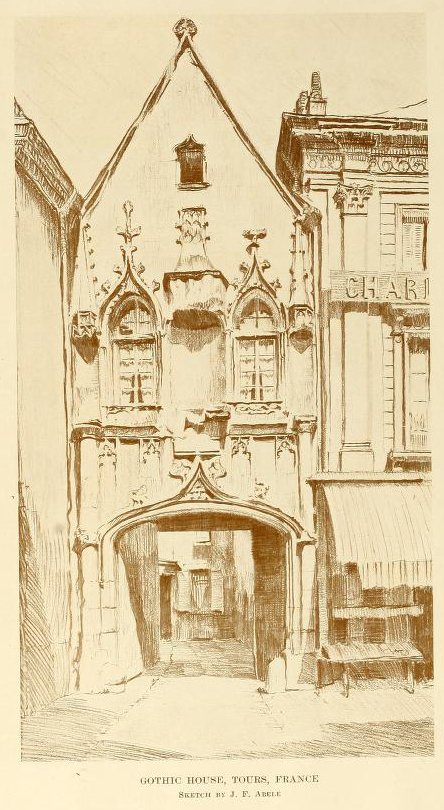
Gothic House, Tours, France (1915), sketch by Abele

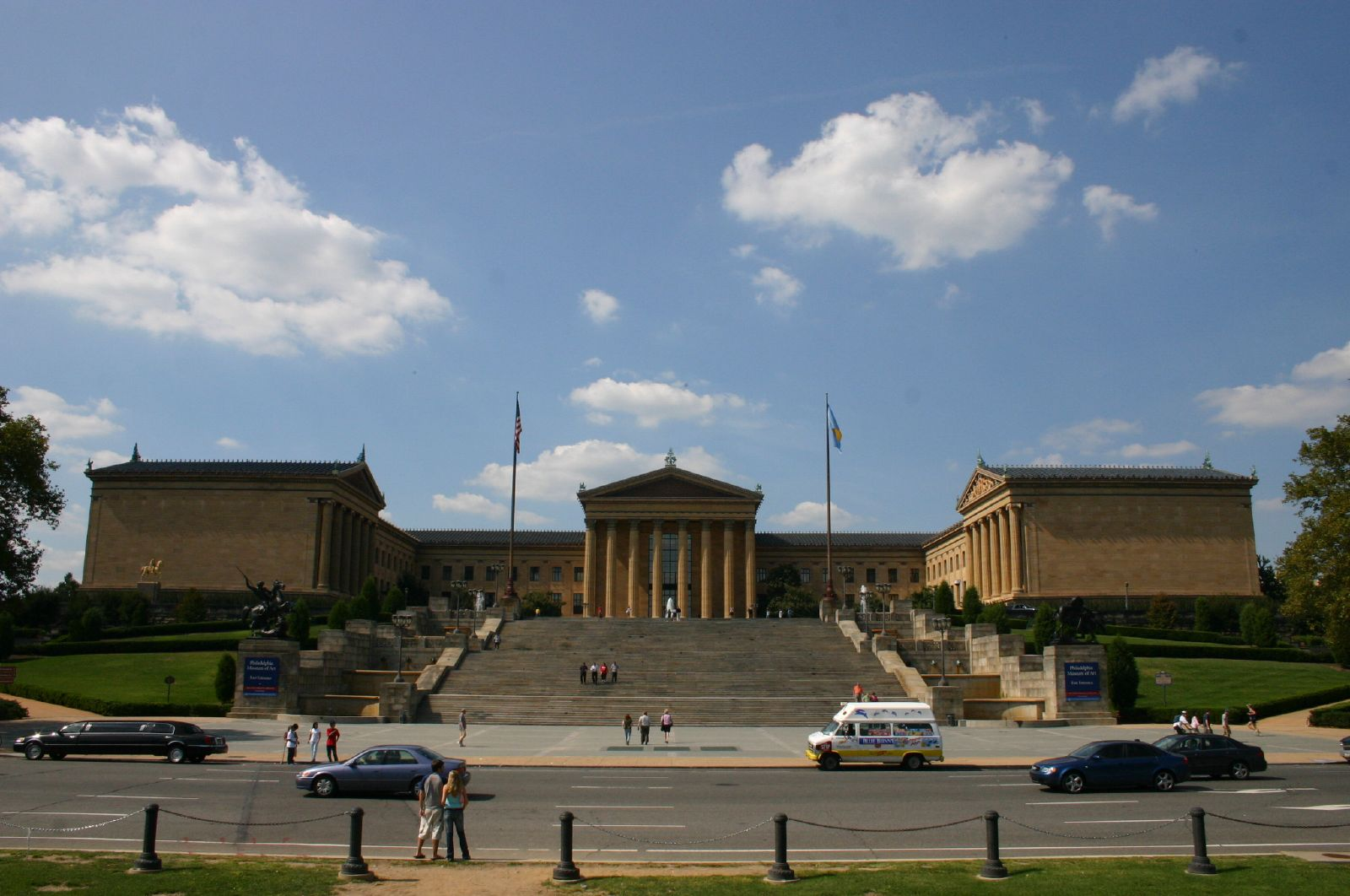
Abele designed the Rocky Steps (1928) and the tiered waterfall cascades flanking them at the Philadelphia Museum of Art

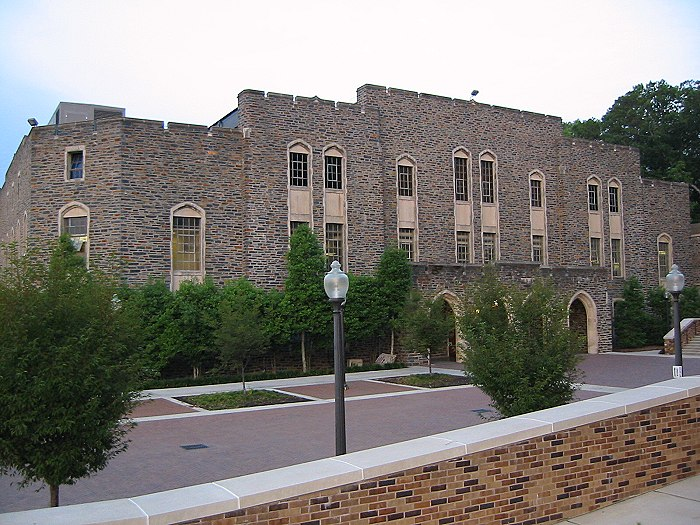
Cameron Indoor Stadium, Duke University, Durham, North Carolina (1940)

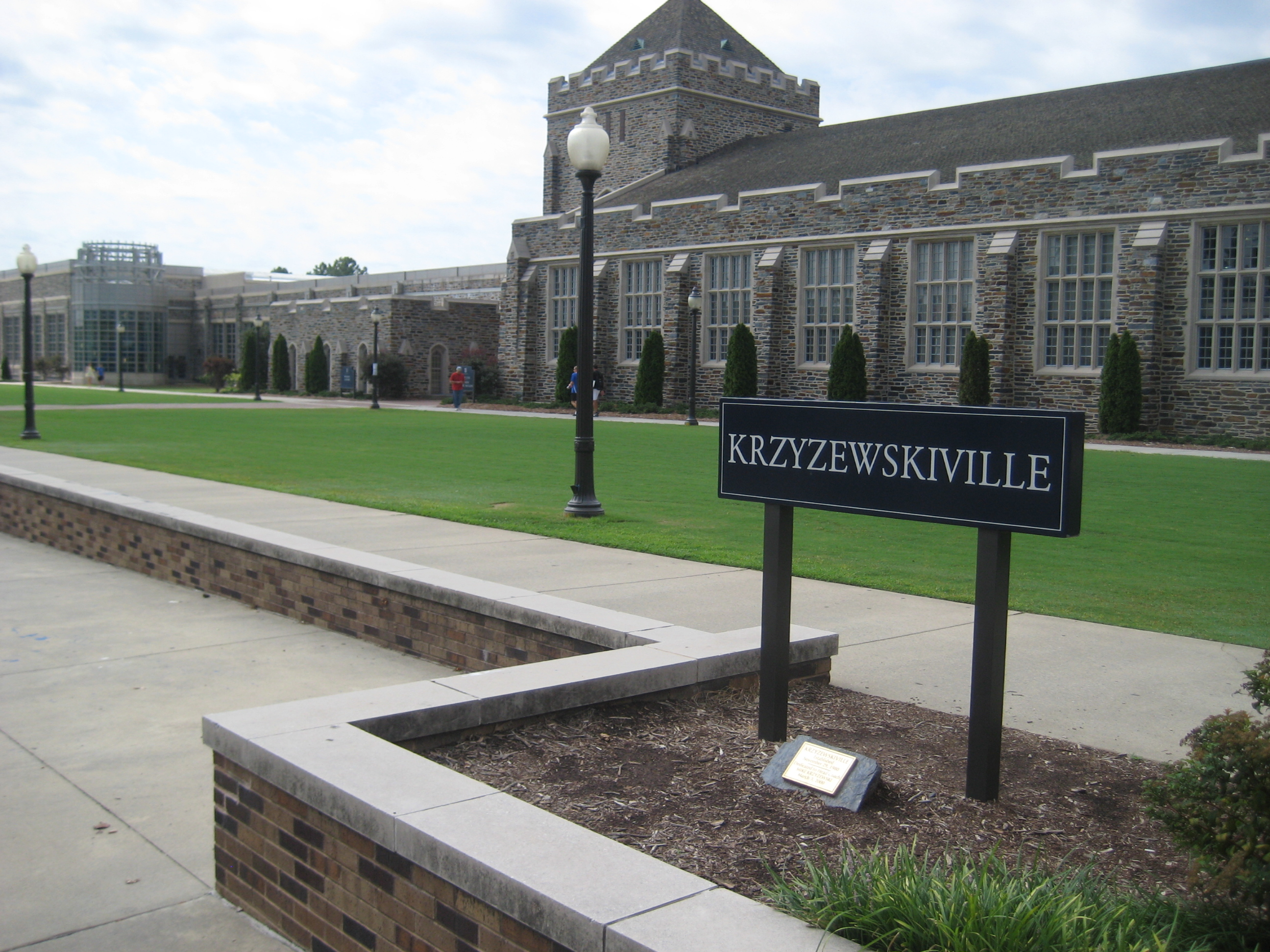
Krzyzewskiville Lawn, Cameron Indoor Stadium, Duke University, Durham, North Carolina

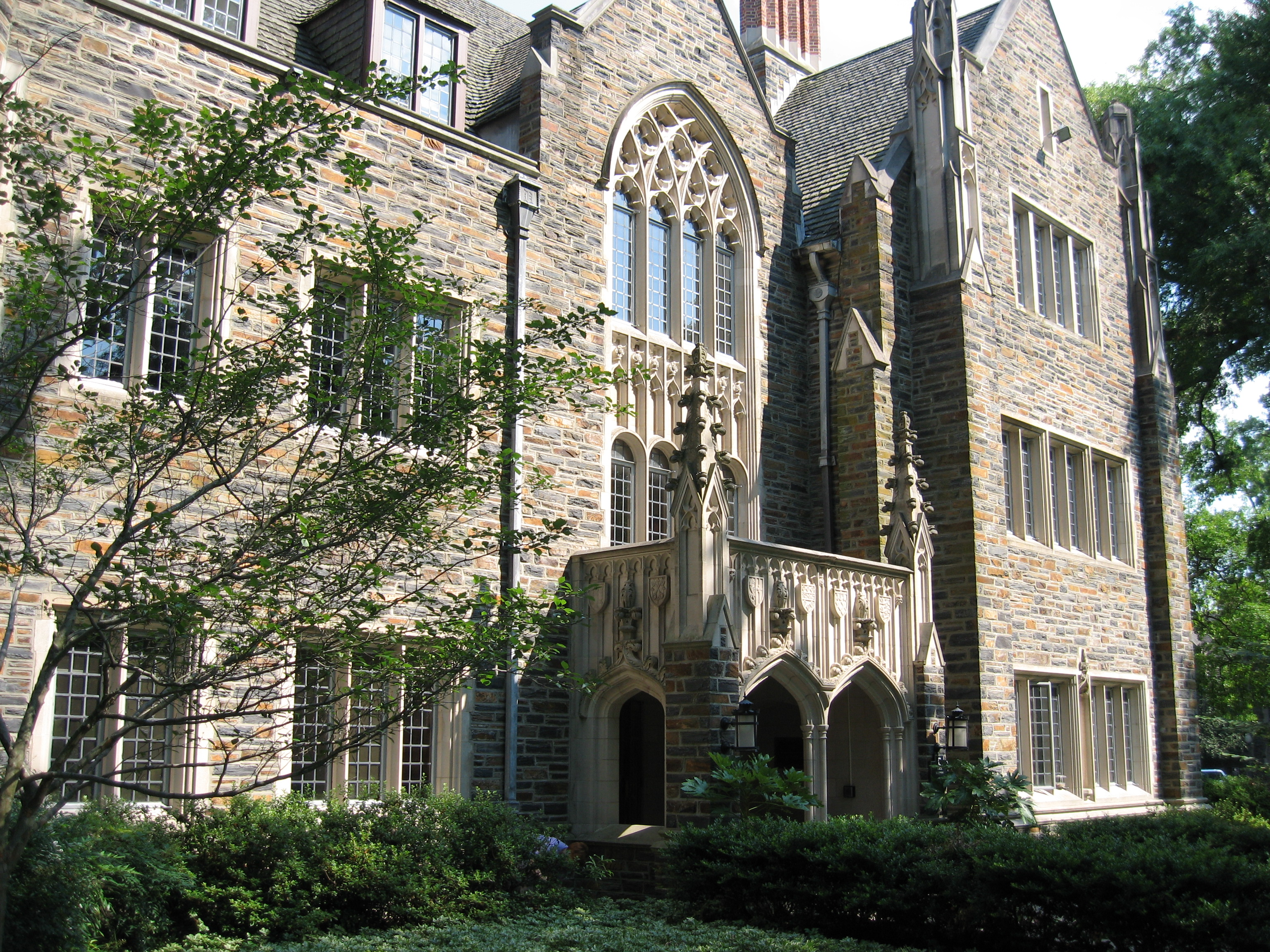
Allen Administrative Building, Duke University, Durham, North Carolina (1954)

== See also ==
- List of Cheyney University of Pennsylvania alumni
