= Daniel Woodmansee =

American politician

Daniel Woodmansee (September 22, 1777 – May 28, 1842) was a member of the Ohio State Senate and Ohio House of Representatives.

Originally from New Jersey, in 1809, Woodmansee and his family moved to Butler County, Ohio after he purchased a 150-acre (0.61 km^{2}) plot of land. Aside from his career as a farmer, he was elected to the Ohio House of Representatives in 1825 and later to the Ohio Senate beginning in 1830, each time representing Butler County. His son James Woodmansee would become a poet.
