= Michael VanRooyen =

American humanitarian and physician (born 1961)

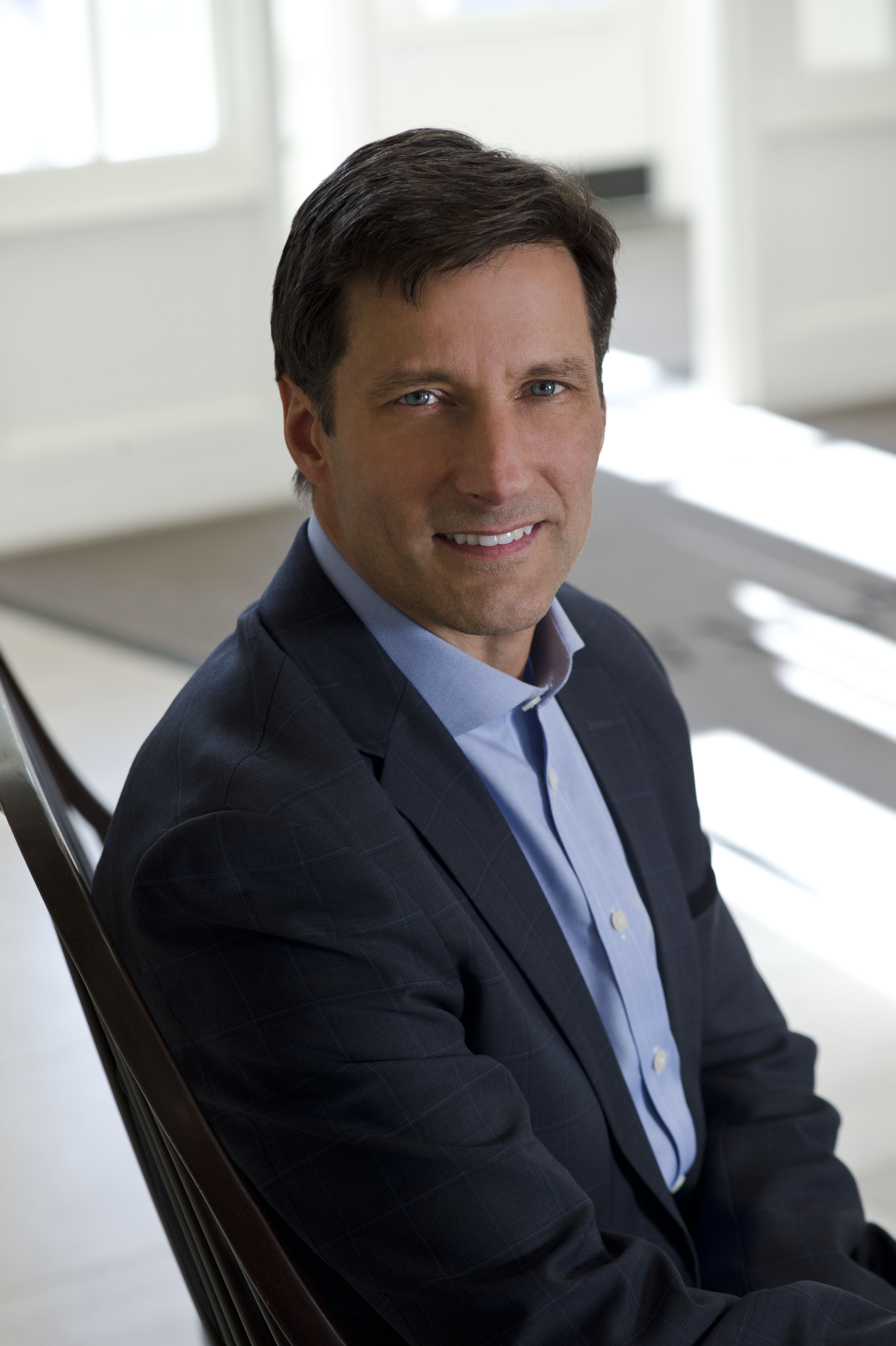
- Born: November 19, 1961 (age 64); St. Johns, Michigan
- Education: Michigan State University (BS); Wayne State University School of Medicine (MD); University of Illinois (MPH)
- Scientific career
- Fields: Emergency medicine Humanitarian Crises
- Workplaces: Harvard University

Michael Johannes VanRooyen (born November 19, 1961) is an American humanitarian and physician, best known for his expertise in emergency medicine and aid delivery in humanitarian crises. VanRooyen is the co-founder and current director of the Harvard Humanitarian Initiative at Harvard University, a university-wide research center that aims to provide practice-based solutions to "relieve human suffering in war and disaster" through interdisciplinary research, education, and policy-development. A leader in the humanitarian field, Boston magazine posited that "the Harvard professor's exploits have inspired legions of followers to dedicate themselves to helping right the political, military, and environmental wrongs of the world."

VanRooyen is currently the chairman of the Departments of Emergency Medicine at the Massachusetts General Hospital and Brigham and Women's Hospital, and also serves as the inaugural chief of Enterprise Emergency Medicine for the Mass General Brigham health system. He is an endowed professor at both Harvard Medical School and the Harvard T.H. Chan School of Public Health []. In April 2016, VanRooyen published, The World's Emergency Room: The Growing Threat to Doctors, Nurses, and Humanitarian Workers, a memoir that traces the growing number of attacks on aid workers through VanRooyen's personal experiences in the field. His current work focuses on advancing humanitarian and crisis leadership.

== Personal life and education ==
VanRooyen was born and raised in St. Johns, Michigan. He attended Michigan State University graduating with a Bachelor of Science in 1984. He attended Wayne State University School of Medicine where he received his MD in 1988. In 1996 VanRooyen completed a fellowship in clinical effectiveness from the Harvard School of Public Health and graduated with a Master of Public Health degree from University of Illinois School of Public Health.

VanRooyen lives in Boston, Massachusetts, and has three children.

== Humanitarian work ==
VanRooyen deployed to countries like Somalia, Rwanda, the Democratic Republic of the Congo, Bosnia, Iraq, and North Korea with numerous non-governmental organizations (NGOs), including: Save the Children, Physicians for Human Rights, Save the Children, and Oxfam. He has also served on the board of the International Rescue Committee and as a policy advisor to the World Health Organization and United Nations Office for the Coordination of Humanitarian Affairs. VanRooyen frequently testifies before the U.S. Congress and the United Nations on issues related to Darfur, Iraq, and the Democratic Republic of the Congo, serving as a policy adviser for governmental and non-governmental organizations alike.

Domestically VanRooyen worked with the American Red Cross to provide humanitarian assistance in the wake of the September 11th attacks and as a coordinator of their field hospital response to Hurricane Katrina. He has provided medical support for the US Secret Service and also worked as a physician in Arizona and New Mexico for the Navajo and Apache tribes.

== Awards and recognition ==
VanRooyen has been recognized by a number of professional societies for his work in humanitarian health, including two endowed professorships at Harvard. He is a fellow in the Explorers Club and holds an honorary Doctorate of Humanities from Michigan State University. Recent awards include:

- 1988: CIBA Award for Outstanding Community Service
- 1988: William K. Quick Centennial Scholar Award – Wayne State University
- 1995: Paul Q. Peterson Scholar in Public Health Excellence – University of Illinois, Chicago
- 2001: Reader's Digest Health Heroes Award
- 2001: Raoul Wallenberg Foundation Humanitarian Award
- 2004: American Medical Association Pride in the Profession Award
- 2004: World Medical Association Most Caring Physician – USA
- 2009: Michigan State University Distinguished Alumni Award
- 2010: Harvard Medical School Office of Diversity Lifetime Achievement Award
- 2010: Boston Business Journal Champions in Healthcare
- 2018: Inaugural Harvard College VanRooyen Award for Student Outreach
