= Martha Woodmansee =

Literary critic

Martha Woodmansee (born 1944) is an American professor at Case Western Reserve University in Cleveland, Ohio. She has been a member of the English department since 1986 and joined the faculty at the School of Law in 2003. In addition, she was the Director of the Society for Critical Exchange, a national organization devoted to collaborative interdisciplinary work in theory. In 2008 she has founded the International Society for the History and Theory of Intellectual Property. A 1999 Guggenheim fellow and 2004 Fulbright fellow, her teaching and research interests are 18th- and 19th-century literature, critical theory, cultural studies including book piracy and the emergence of international copyright during the nineteenth century.

Woodmansee attended Northwestern University (B.A.) and Stanford University (M.A., Ph.D).

== Works ==
=== Author ===
- The Author, Art, and the Market: Rereading the History of Aesthetics. Columbia UP, 1994. ISBN 0231106017

=== Editor ===
- The New Economic Criticism: Studies at the Interface of Literature and Economics. Routledge, 1999.
- The Construction of Authorship: Textual Appropriation in Law and Literature (co-edited with Peter Jaszi). Duke UP, 1994. ISBN 0822314126
- Erkennen und Deuten. Essays zur Literatur und Literaturtheorie. Erich Schmidt, 1983.

=== Translator ===
- Szondi, Peter. Introduction to Literary Hermeneutics. Cambridge UP, 1995. ISBN 0521301114
