= Salim Muwakkil =

American journalist, editor and political commentator (born 1947)

- Born: Alonzo James Cannady; January 20, 1947 (age 79); New York City, U.S.
- Education: Rutgers University
- Occupations: Journalist, Author
- Employer: In These Times
- Title: Senior Editor

Salim Muwakkil (born Alonzo James Cannady, January 20, 1947) is an American journalist and political commentator, based in Chicago. He is a senior editor at In These Times magazine and an op-ed columnist for the Chicago Tribune.

Muwakkil writes on African-American issues, Middle East politics, and US foreign policy. He is a Crime and Communities Media Fellow of the Open Society Institute, and teaches a seminar on race, media, and politics for the Urban Studies Program of the Associated Colleges of the Midwest.

Muwakkil, born in New York City, attended Rutgers University in New Jersey; he graduated with a BA in Political Science in 1973.

== Background and career ==
After graduating from Linden High School, Muwakkil joined the U.S. Air Force in 1964. After serving five-years as an administration specialist in Germany, he returned in 1969 and enrolled at Rutgers University, graduating in 1973. He joined the Black Panther Party directly after his discharge.

Shortly before his graduation, Muwakkil began his journalism career at the Associated Press in Newark, New Jersey, as a reporter.

Later, he joined the Nation of Islam. He moved to Muhammad Speaks and its successor Bilalian News as a copy editor and then managing editor. He is now a former activist in that movement.

After moving to Chicago, Muwakkil joined the staff at In These Times in 1983 and became a contributing writer to the Chicago Sun-Times and the Chicago Tribune. He hosts "The Salim Muwakkil" show on WVON, Chicago's historic Black radio station.

Muwakkil serves as board member for the Progressive Media Project and the Chicago-based Public Square. In the past he has been an adjunct professor at Columbia College, Northwestern University's Medill School of Journalism, and the School of the Art Institute of Chicago.

== Bibliography ==
Muwakkil wrote the text for the book, "Harold!: Photographs from the Harold Washington Years." He has also been a contributing author of other works as listed below.

- Journal of Ordinary Thought, Summer 2008: Authors of History, Neighborhood Writing Alliance, 2008
- Appeal to Reason: 25 years in these times, Seven Stories Press, 2002
- States of Confinement, Palgrave Macmillan, New York, 2000
- The Farrakhan Factor: African-American writers on minister Louis Farrakhan, Grove Press, 1998
- The Bell Curve Debate, Times Books, 1995
- Collateral Damage: The New World Order at Home and Abroad, South End Press, 1992

Other publications in which Muwakkil's work has appeared include The Washington Post, The New York Times Book Review, The Chicago Reader, The Progressive, Newsday, Cineaste, The Baltimore Sun, Z Magazine, Toronto Star, The Philadelphia Inquirer, and Utne Reader.

== Awards and recognition ==
Muwakkil has been recognized for his journalism as listed below:

- 2022 Marcus Garvey History And Education Lifetime Award - Chicago Music Awards--https://www.chicagomusicawards.org/copy-of-nominees-vote-1
- 2021 Lifetime Achievement Award - Institute of Kemetic Yoga --https://myemail.constantcontact.com/Soul-Yoga-Fest-Resurrection-July-9---10--2021-Fuller-Park-Field-House-Chicago.html?soid=1101914437981&aid=cG_za-a__YA
- 2004 Lillian Award for Excellence in Journalism - Delta Sigma Theta sorority
- 2001 Studs Terkel Award for Journalistic Excellence - Chicago-based Community Media Workshop
- 1997 Black Rose Achievement Award - League of Black Women
- 1994 Top Ten Media Heroes - Institute of Alternative Journalism
