= David Moberg (journalist) =

American labor reporter (1943–2022)

David Moberg (September 27, 1943 − July 17, 2022) was a prominent American labor reporter, whose work furthered democracy and social justice. He was the senior editor of In These Times magazine, where he was on the staff since 1976.

== Early life ==
Moberg was the son of a farmer who managed a farmer-owned cooperative in Knox County, Illinois. His mother was a grade school teacher and genealogist. He grew up on the family farm near the small Illinois town of Galesburg. In high school he did farm work and once led a walkout of his fellow workers, who were detasseling corn. He graduated from Galesburg High School in 1961.

== Education and early career ==
He attended Carleton College and wrote for the student newspaper. He also published an alternative paper. After graduating in 1965 Moberg went to Los Angeles and reported for Newsweek where his reporting included the nascent United Farm Workers union and the LA riots. Moberg also interviewed Bob Dylan and wrote about the emerging youth culture. Frustrated by eastern Newsweek editors changing his stories, Moberg left the job to travel. After visiting the Middle East and North Africa, he went to Paris in 1968. There he heard anthropologist Claude Lévi-Strauss lecture, where upon he returned to the United States to study anthropology at the University of Chicago. His choice for his Ph.D. thesis was not a distant indigenous culture, but instead he chose a new General Motors’ plant in Lordstown, Ohio, where “tyrannical work rules, boredom and work speedup were subjects for his contemporary anthropology,” wrote his friend Noel Barker. He applied a historian's long view to the declining movement. His research is on file at Wayne State University.

== Prominent labor journalist ==
In 1976 he joined the staff of the newly founded labor publication, In These Times. He remained with the magazine for 40 years, eventually becoming its senior editor.

He is known for his reporting on the World Trade Organization summit in Seattle in 1999. He also reported on the anti-sweatshop campaigns on college campuses associated with globalization, on the treatment of workers by multinational corporations and labor unrest in the developing world.

He was recognized as a leading journalist covering the labor movement in the United States. His peers considered his work essential for every labor reporter. Labor professor Lance Compa credited Moberg's 2007 feature article ‘“Solidarity Without Borders,’” as one example of this attention.

In addition to writing for In These Times, Moberg wrote for The Nation, The American Prospect, The Progressive, Salon.com, The New York Times, the Chicago Tribune, the Chicago Sun-Times, the Chicago Reader, The New Republic, Dissent, L.A. Weekly, World Policy Journal, Newsday, the Boston Globe, Utne Reader, and Mother Jones.

Moberg also taught anthropology and sociology at multiple institutions, including DePaul University, Loyola University, Roosevelt University, Northeastern Illinois University and the Illinois Institute of Technology.

He was the recipient of many awards and fellowships.

- Max Steinbock Award from the International Labor Communications Association, (2003);
- Forbes MediaGuide 500: A review of the Nation's Most Important Journalists (1993, 1994)l
- Project Censored Award in 1995.
- The Nation Institute (1999-2001);
- John D. and Catherine T. MacArthur Foundation (1995-1997);

== Death ==
On July 17, 2022, Moberg died at his Chicago Hyde Park home after battling Parkinson's Disease.
