= James Weinstein (author) =

American historian and publisher (1926–2005)

- Born: July 17, 1926; New York City, U.S.
- Died: June 16, 2005 (aged 78); Chicago, Illinois, U.S.
- Education: Cornell University (BA); Columbia University (MA)
- Occupations: Historian; editor; publisher
- Notable work: In These Times
- Political party: Communist Party USA (1948–1956); Independent (1966); Democratic (after 1966)
- Spouses: Thrice divorced, Jaclyn Cronick, Anne Farrar, Elaine Draper, Beth Maschinot
- Children: 2

James Weinstein (July 17, 1926 – June 16, 2005) was an American historian and editor best known as the founder and publisher of In These Times, a progressive magazine started in 1976 in Chicago.

== Early life and education ==
James Weinstein was born in Manhattan on July 17, 1926, to an affluent family whose money came from real estate. He served in the United States Navy during World War II, and afterward, earned a bachelor's degree in government from Cornell University in 1949, and a master's degree in history from Columbia University in 1956.

== Political views and affiliations ==
As a young man, Weinstein supported the 1948 presidential campaign of Henry A. Wallace, who ran on the Progressive Party ticket. The campaign was backed by the Communist Party, which he joined that same year. As a member of the Communist Party, Weinstein made the acquaintance of Julius Rosenberg and was heavily surveilled by the Federal Bureau of Investigation, whose file on him ran over 2,000 pages in length. Weinstein left the party in 1956, in objection to the Soviet Union's repression of the Hungarian Revolution.

In 1966, Weinstein ran for the United States House of Representatives from New York's 19th congressional district as an independent socialist candidate, advocating an immediate end to American involvement in the Vietnam War, but he lost, receiving 3.8% of the vote. After founding In These Times, he continued to identify as a socialist, but in his editorials, he encouraged leftists to work within the Democratic Party. In the 1980s, Weinstein publicly affirmed that he believed that the Rosenbergs had been spies, which alienated some on the left.

== Career ==
Weinstein lived and worked in San Francisco, Madison, Wisconsin, and Coventry, England, teaching at the University of Warwick's Centre for the Study of Social History, before becoming a central figure among left-wing Democrats in his adopted home of Chicago, where he founded In These Times in 1976. He was inspired by Civil Rights icon Julian Bond, and intellectuals Noam Chomsky and Herbert Marcuse, both teaching at the University of Chicago at the time. He edited the magazine until he retired in 1999.

Weinstein wrote numerous history books, including The Decline of Socialism in America, The Corporate Ideal in the Liberal State, and The Long Detour: The History and Future of the American Left. He also founded the journals Studies on the Left and Socialist Revolution (later renamed Socialist Review and ultimately Radical Society). He was one of the founders of Modern Times Bookstore in San Francisco.

== Personal life ==
Weinstein was a committed fan of the Chicago Cubs and enjoyed experimenting with culinary recipes. He was married four times and divorced three times, with his fourth marriage, to Beth Maschinot, lasting until his death; he had two children from his first marriage.

Weinstein died from brain cancer at his home in Chicago on June 16, 2005, aged 78.

== Works ==
- "Radicalism in the Midst of Normalcy," Journal of American History, vol. 52, no. 4 (March 1966), pp. 773–790. In JSTOR
- The Decline of Socialism in America, 1912-1925. New York: Monthly Review Press, 1967.
- The Corporate Idea in the Liberal State, 1900-1918. Boston: Beacon Press, 1968.
- The Communists of the 1930s and the New Left. With Max Gordon. New York: Viewpoint Publishing Group, 1976.
