= Annette DiMeo Carlozzi =

American art curator (active 1975–present)

Annette Carlozzi
- Education: Brandeis University; University of Minnesota
- Occupation: Art curator
- Years active: 1978–present
- Employer: Blanton Museum of Art (1996–2014)

Annette DiMeo Carlozzi is an American curator of contemporary art based in Austin, Texas. Raised in suburban Boston, she graduated from Brandeis University in 1975 with a BA degree in Art History, magna cum laude, studying with Professors Carl Belz, Gerald Bernstein, and Stephen Whitfield. A first-generation college student, she received a full scholarship to and attended the MA program in Museum Studies at the University of Minnesota. From 1976 to 1978, Carlozzi began her professional training as a Curatorial/Education Fellow at Walker Art Center in Minneapolis under the mentorship of Director Martin Friedman.

== Early career ==
After spending 1978 to 1979 working in the Visual Arts department of the National Endowment for the Arts under the guidance of assistant director Renato Danese and Patricia Fuller in the Art in Public Places program, Carlozzi was ready to start her curatorial career. In 1979 she was hired by Director Laurence Miller as the first professional Curator at Laguna Gloria Art Museum (LGAM), Austin, Texas, a small regional, non-collecting museum with an outdoor sculpture program, community art school, and an active roster of changing exhibitions. There, she commissioned artists Elyn Zimmerman, Clyde Connell, and Nancy Holt to create temporary, site-specific sculptures for the grounds, and Dan Flavin to create fluorescent light installations for the historic villa that the museum occupied. (The Holt remains, now gifted to The Contemporary Austin—organizational outgrowth of Laguna Gloria Art Museum—by the Holt/Smithson Foundation.)

In addition to securing national loan exhibitions that brought to Austin surveys of work by Gordon Parks, Robert Smithson, Buckminster Fuller, Robert Wilson, Jan Groover, and Hollis Frampton, Carlozzi brought important thematic exhibitions, such as “Afro-American Abstraction,” 1982, curated by April Kingsley for P.S. 1. In addition, Carlozzi organized “Luis Jiménez," a mid-career survey of the nationally celebrated, El Paso–based artist, which traveled to The Alternative Museum, New York City; “Rafael Ferrer: Impassioned Rhythms,” another mid-career survey of the Philadelphia-based installation- and object-maker who was transitioning to painting, which traveled to El Museo del Barrio, New York City, Gibbes Art Gallery in Charleston, SC, and the University of South Florida Art Galleries in Tampa; and an annual, family-friendly thematic exhibition with local, regional and national artists, shown intermixed. Other nationally known artists she introduced to Austin at LGAM included Howardena Pindell, Robert Kushner, Sarah Charlesworth, Betty Woodman, and Sweet Honey in the Rock. From 1980 to 1986 Carlozzi expanded the museum’s nascent “New Works” series of premiere showings by Austin-based artists to include over fifty artists chosen from year-round studio visits within an even larger local network. For the statewide sesquicentennial in 1986, Carlozzi organized “Outdoor Sculptures by Texas Artists,” which traveled six large sculptures by leading Texas artists (James Surls, Bob Wade, Luis Jiménez, Jim Love, Jesús Moroles, Mac Whitney), plus an outdoor, sculptural ice-carving event by the inimitable Bert Long Jr, to small towns throughout Texas after premiering at a new commercial development site in the rolling hills of northwest Austin.

During those seven years at LGAM, Carlozzi began to develop her career-long commitment to providing opportunities to women artists, artists of color, other under-recognized artists living outside the art world mainstreams, and artists beginning their careers. She is the author of 50 Texas Artists, (1986), the third entry in Chronicle Books’ series that showcased artists based in regional art centers across the United States.

== Directorships ==
In late 1986, Carlozzi was named the director of the Aspen Art Museum in Colorado. During her tenure at the still-young institution (formerly named the Aspen Center for the Visual Arts), she expanded: programming; membership; attendance; earned income; individual, foundation and governmental support; and community-wide, statewide and national partnerships. She oversaw national loan exhibitions surveying the works of Vito Acconci, Jenny Holzer and Alexis Smith. Responding to local demand, in 1987 she curated an exhibition drawn from her book on Texas artists called “Third Coast Review: A Look at Art in Texas,” pairing the 60 works in the show with a soundscape of Texas music genres (outlaw country, blues, jazz, Tejano) that played in the galleries throughout; the exhibition traveled within Colorado and to Blue Star Art Space in San Antonio, Texas. Carlozzi also curated a mid-career survey for iconoclast Peter Saul, which premiered in Aspen and traveled from 1989-90 to the Museum of Contemporary Art Chicago; Laguna Gloria Art Museum, Austin; and the Contemporary Arts Center, New Orleans. And she co-curated with museum curator David Floria both “Sculpture/Aspen ’88,” a summertime series of temporary, site-specific commissions that appeared throughout Aspen, and “Latitudes: Focus on Chicago,” 1988, which built upon the regional focus of the Texas book and exhibition to examine new art in Chicago, the city of Aspen’s original founders.

In both Texas and Colorado, Carlozzi served leadership roles on City, County, State and Federal art advisory panels, with a particular focus on new commissions of public art.

In 1989 Carlozzi was recruited to become executive director of the Contemporary Arts Center (CAC), New Orleans, one of the largest and longest-tenured artists-run/alternative spaces in the U.S. There, she oversaw a dynamic menu of artist-led programs in the visual arts, theater, performance art, music and K-12 arts education. Building upon the work of the CAC’s previous executive director, Adolfo V. Nodal, Carlozzi launched the Center’s first capital campaign and completed the 40,000 sq. ft. Concordia Architects-designed renovation of the lower floors of the downtown brick warehouse the CAC had occupied since its inception. The newly refurbished building provided the opportunity to commission a number of Louisiana-based artists to create permanent, site-specific works throughout the facility, including a signature elevator shaft by Tina Girouard, front desk by Gene Koss, ramp ceiling by Martin Payton, exterior light sconces by Mario Villa, digital information board by Steve Sweet, and a donor recognition system designed by Brian Borrello and Wayne Troyer. After the grand reopening of the CAC facility in late 1990, Carlozzi directed three seasons of a newly invigorated, multidisciplinary program, expanding audience, membership, community and corporate outreach, and was named a YWCA Role Model in 1992.

At the CAC, Carlozzi was charged in particular with enhancing and diversifying the Center’s visual arts programming. She brought in traveling exhibitions of new sculpture from Nagoya City, Japan and a Frankfurt Museum-organized survey of unrealized Soviet architectural proposals, as well as Latinx scholar Amalia Mesa-Bains’ landmark 1993 exhibition, “Ceremony of Spirit: Nature and Memory in Contemporary Latino Art,” and Dr. Lowery Stokes Sims’ “Next Generation: Southern Black Aesthetic,” 1992. During “Next Generation,” she collaborated with musical theater artist Kenneth Raphael to create a dance performance/tour of the exhibition for upper-level donors to the CAC, deepening her goal of introducing rigorous contemporary art to general audiences through experimentation across genres. And she curated the next installment of her exploration of regional art centers with “LA Next,” 1993, featuring new works by Los Angeles–based artists Karen Carson, Charles Gaines, Tom Knechtel, Manuel Ocampo, George Stone and Pat Ward Williams. She also advised in the groundbreaking presentation of the Lisa Corrin-curated “Soul Shadows: Urban Warrior Myths” by New Orleans–based artist Dawn DeDeaux. During those early years of the renovated building, working artists led the disciplinary areas, including Julie Hébert (theater), Jay Weigel (music), and Lew Thomas (visual arts); other key members of the team included MK Wegmann (associate director), Peggy Morrison Outon (development director), Elena Ronquillo (performance art), Pamela Marquis (education), and Michael Swindle (visual arts associate).

From 1990 to 1994, Carlozzi served on the Federal Advisory Committee for International Exhibitions (FACIE), the artist advisory for U.S. representation at the Venice Biennale, São Paulo Art Biennial, and various other recurring international art exhibitions; she traveled as a FACIE evaluator to Cuenca, Ecuador and Barcelona, Spain as well. And she continued her work as an advisor, panelist and panel chair for New Orleans entities, for nearby Houston’s Cultural Arts Council, and for regional museums and galleries.

== 1996 Olympic Games Cultural Olympiad ==
In mid-1993, Carlozzi was recruited to become the Visual Arts Producer for the 1996 Olympic Games in Atlanta. She spent three years commissioning site-specific works of art from an international roster of artists including Betye Saar, Vito Acconci, Tony Cragg, Enric Pladevall and Yukinori Yanagi. By far the largest and most significant commission of Carlozzi’s career was implementing the selection of the first fine artist to design and fabricate the Olympic Cauldron: internationally celebrated artist Siah Armajani, who was based in Minneapolis since his emigration from Persia (Iran) to the U.S. in 1960. Carlozzi oversaw the development of Armajani’s multi-million-dollar structure–a bridge, tower, and vessel to hold the Olympic Flame– that was attached to the newly built Olympic Stadium and presided over the Games competitions, playing a key role in the opening and closing ceremonies. Carlozzi also co-organized with Nexus Contemporary Arts Center a groundbreaking research project/exhibition called “Out of Bounds: New Works by Eight Southeast Artists” that later traveled to the University of Texas at Austin. As Producer, she initiated dozens of community partnerships and provided planning assistance and funding for seventeen Atlanta-area exhibitions and visual art projects co-presented during the 1996 Olympic Arts Festival. These exhibitions included the High Museum’s “Rings: Five Passions in World Art,” guest-curated by National Gallery of Art director J. Carter Brown, and “Souls Grown Deep: African-American Vernacular Art of the South,” a 400+ work exhibition featuring mini-surveys of work by self-taught artists from throughout the South drawn from the Arnett Family Collection, and organized by the Michael C. Carlos Museum at Emory University.

During the Olympic Arts Festival (OAF), which coincided with the Games competitions, Carlozzi was the producer-in-charge the night of the bombing at Centennial Olympic Park, the multi-acre venue that had been created as a gathering space for large crowds and most of the OAF’s concert programming. While the stage had been shut down for the night just earlier and no one directly associated with the Olympic Arts Festival was injured, multiple casualties did occur and the search for the true perpetrator took years, with the event ultimately considered an instance of domestic terrorism.

== Blanton Museum of Art ==
In 1996, Carlozzi, then-husband Thomas Zigal and their son, Danny Zigal, moved back to Austin, Texas (home of the Zigal clan) after she was recruited to become the founding American and Contemporary Art curator at what was then called the Huntington Art Museum at the University of Texas at Austin; it was subsequently renamed the Blanton Museum of Art prior to the opening of its new museum facility in 2006. In addition to imagining what a contemporary art program could and should be at the Blanton, Carlozzi served on the senior management team that helped develop the Blanton into one of the foremost university art museums in the U.S.

With limited funding for acquisitions, Carlozzi inaugurated a robust program of changing exhibitions of 19th-21st century art that built upon the Michener Collection of 20th Century American Painting, but reflected a broader art canon that crossed many mediums, cultural traditions and geographic boundaries. She brought in nationally touring exhibitions, including “Blurring the Boundaries: Installation Art 1969-1996,” “Birth of the Cool: California Art, Design and Culture at Mid-Century,” and “El Anatsui: When I Last Wrote to You about Africa.” Carlozzi herself curated countless exhibitions over her eighteen years at the Blanton, including “Negotiating Small Truths,” 1999; “Transgressive Women,” 2003; “Paul Chan: Present Tense,” 2006; “Workspace: Matthew Day Jackson,” 2007; “Mike’s World: Michael Smith and Joshua White (and other collaborators),” 2007, which traveled to the ICA-Philadelphia, 2008; “Workspace: In Katrina’s Wake,” 2008; “Desire,” 2010; “Through the Eyes of Texas,” 2013, the special exhibition drawn from nationwide UT alumni collections in celebration of the Blanton’s 50th anniversary; and “Perception Unfolds: Looking at Deborah Hay’s Dance,” 2014, which traveled to the Yale University School of Art, 2014 and to the Academie der Kunst, Berlin, 2019.

Integrating the Blanton’s notable holdings of 20th-century North and South American art was an abiding goal for both Carlozzi and her colleague, Gabriel Pérez-Barreiro, who co-curated “America/Americas,” 2006–2010, even as they both solicited donors’ gifts to build up the collections. “America/Americas” was one of the first U.S. museum collection displays that integrated art from throughout the Western Hemisphere. Carlozzi was successful in inaugurating a diverse and dynamic collection of contemporary art for the museum, including a major new commission by Teresita Fernández and discrete works by Louise Nevelson, Anselm Kiefer, David Reed, Richard Long, El Anatsui, Ana Mendieta, Vito Acconci, Terry Adkins, Glenn Ligon, a commission by Byron Kim, Celia Álvarez Muñoz, Cao Fei, Charles Gaines, Luis Cruz Azaceta, Radcliffe Bailey, Vernon Fisher, Lee Lozano, Dario Robleto, Bill Viola, Leo Villareal and George Sugarman, as well as promised gifts by Shahzia Sikander, Anne Chu, Amy Sillman, Rachel Harrison, Marilyn Minter and many others. In addition, the Blanton was awarded the Dorothy and Herbert Vogel Collection gift for Texas, thanks to previously hosting a survey exhibition of their collection organized by the National Gallery of Art. In 2006, assisted by co-editor Dr. Kelly Baum, Carlozzi published a new collection catalog detailing 250 works in the “American” collection she had expanded and re-envisioned; subsequently, she contributed to and co-edited two collection handbooks featuring highlights and favorites from across the Blanton’s disparate collections.

From 2000 to 2010, Carlozzi was a member of the national Summer Contemporary Curators Conference and served on its steering committee in her last two years. She also consulted widely from 1996-2014, largely on matters of artist selection and on grant-making panels, for over fifty organizations across the U.S., including Artpace San Antonio, Creative Capital, the Nimoy Foundation, and Invisible-Exports' "Artist of the Month Club" 2011 commission with artist Cauleen Smith. Her catalog essays on artists including Radcliffe Bailey, Hoang van Bui, Frank X. Tolbert II, Celia Álvarez Muñoz, Terry Adkins and Teresita Fernández have appeared in large and small publications across the country.

== Recent years ==
Carlozzi retired from the Blanton in 2014, having served not only as founding American/Contemporary Curator, but also Director of Curatorial Affairs (2007-2010), Deputy Director for Art & Programs (2010 to 2012), and finally, Curator at Large (2012 to 2014). She has been an independent curator since then, organizing “Immersed,” 2016, for the Linda Pace Foundation; “After Carolee: Tender and Fierce,” 2021, for Artpace San Antonio on the occasion of its 25th anniversary; and in 2023, “Sketches for Three Voices,” an exhibition of new works by artist Francesca Fuchs and a writing collaboration among Fuchs, poet Joanna Klink, and Carlozzi, featured at Testsite, Austin. She has participated in a number of such collaborative creative projects over the years in Austin, including performing several times with dancer/choreographer Deborah Hay, writing ekphrastic poetry for artist Annette Lawrence, and writing fiction for “ArtFiction: Ten Modernists from Texas,” a project by artist/curator Rino Pizzi. Carlozzi currently serves on the board and executive committee of The Contemporary Austin and is active in the Austin arts scene, mentoring artists and young arts professionals and supporting a myriad of arts organizations with advocacy and small-scale philanthropy, alongside husband Dan Bullock. She was inducted into the Austin Arts Hall of Fame in 2013.
