= Milagros de la Torre =

New York artist and teacher

- Born: Lima, Peru
- Education: University of the Arts London
- Known for: Photography, Art
- Website: www.milagrosdelatorre.com

Milagros de la Torre is an artist based in New York.

Her work is a part of the permanent collection at the Museum of Modern Art in New York. De la Torre was awarded the Guggenheim Fellowship in Creative Arts - Photography in 2011 and the Smithsonian Artist Fellowship Award in 2021.

She is a part of the Advisory Board at the Penumbra Foundation in New York.

== Career ==
De la Torre is an artist who has been working since the 90s. She immigrated from Peru at an early age to follow her career in London, Paris, Mexico City, and finally settled in New York. De la Torre was named the Wolf Chair in Photography at the Cooper Union (Fall 2023) , where she gave an artist talk.

She has given artist lectures at New York University Institute of Fine Arts, Columbia University, Parsons School of Design, New York University, the International Center of Photography, Pratt Institute, School of the Museum of Fine Arts at Tufts, Artpace, Americas Society, Lima Art Museum, MALBA, and the School of Visual Arts.

== Awards and honors ==
De la Torre received the Guggenheim Fellowship in 2011, the Dora Maar Fellowship from The Brown Foundation in 2014, the Peter S. Reed Foundation Photography Award in 2016, the "Merited Person of Culture Medal" from the Minister of Culture in Peru in 2016, the Sustainable Arts Foundation Residency Grant in 2020, Hundred Heroines in 2021, and the Smithsonian Artist Fellowship Award in 2021.

== Works ==
- Under the Black Sun (1991-1993)
- It All Stays in the Family (1994)
- Folded Pages (1996)
- Last Things (1996)
- The Lost Steps (1996)
- Blank (1998)
- The Disappeared (1998)
- Censored (2000)
- Armored (2000)
- Newborn (2001)
- Nocturnal (2002)
- Untitled (Vomiting) (2002)
- Bleus (2002)
- Fears (2004)
- Fingerprints (2004)
- Untitled (Poland) (2005)
- Implanted (2007)
- F.F (2007)
- Bulletproof (2008)
- The End (2008)
- Helmets (2009)
- Imrinted (2010-2011)
- Systems and Constellations (2013)
- Countermaneuver - and Elusive Messages (2012-2013)
- An Inventory - of One (1989 - continuing)
- Diary of the Cure for an Evil Eye (2018)
- Intervals (2020)
- Reollection (2021)

== Collections ==
De la Torre's work is part of the following public collections:

- Museum of Modern Art, New York, NY
- Art Institute of Chicago, Chicago, IL
- Museum of Fine Arts, Houston, TX
- Blanton Museum of Art, Austin, TX
- Harvard Art Museum, Cambridge, MA
- Princeton University Art Museum, Princeton, NJ
- Yale University, New Haven, CT
- MIT List Visual Arts Center, Cambridge, MA
- El Museo del Barrio, New York, NY
- RISD Museum, Providence, RI
- Ruby City, San Antonio, TX
- The Diane and Bruce Halle Collection, Scottsdale, AZ
- Worcester Art Museum, Worcester, MA
- Museum of Latin American Art, Long Beach, CA
- Fonds National d'Art Contemporain, Paris, FR
- Museo Nacional Centro de Arte Reina Sofía, Madrid, ES
- Essex Collection of Art from Latin America, Colchester, UK
- University of Salamanca, Salamanca, ES
- Museo de Arte Carillo Gil, Mexico City, MX
- Lima Art Museum, Lima, PE
- Museo Nacional de Bellas Artes, Buenos Aires, ARG
- Latin American Art Museum of Buenos Aires (MALBA), ARG

== Reviews and Articles ==
- Stanford Report, August 28, 2023 “The Art of Change” at Cantor Arts Center by Robin Wander
- Columbia University School of the Arts, February 22, 2023 “Photography in Ink” at Penumbra Foundation by Mădălina Telea Borteș
- Glasstire, December 27, 2021 “Ruby City Acquires Works by BIPOC Artists” by Jessica Fuentes
- Clarín, June 23, 2020 “Burlas al falo: la obra que el Malba compró en arteBA” by Verónica Abdala
- Glasstire, June 3, 2020 “Ramos, de la Torre, and Castro at Artpace San Antonio” by Neil Fauerso
- La Nación, April 27, 2020 “El Malba, pionero en la era digital: anunció por Zoom compras virtuales en arteBA” by Celina Chatruc
- MALBA Museum Diario, April 27, 2020 “Fotografías de Maris Bustamante y Milagros de la Torre ingresan a la Colección” by MALBA
- notiamérica, February 26, 2019 “Artistas peruanos de la colección Hochschild 'dialogan' con Goya o Alonso Cano en Madrid en el marco de ARCO” by notiamérica
- El Mundo, February 24, 2017 “El viejo y nuevo Perú se encuentran en la Colección Hochschild” at Sala Alcalá 31 by Alba Díaz
- New York Times, June 19, 2014 "In an Ironic Lens, a Latin Myth Evaporated: 'Urbes Mutantes' at The International Center of Photography" by Holland Cotter
- New York Times, May 16, 2014 “Latin America’s Mutating Cities, in Photographs” by Maurice Berger at the International Center of Photography, New York
- Jeu de Paume, March 23, 2013 "Observed: Milagros de la Torre" by Shelley Rice
- The New Yorker, July 1, 2012 "Observed: Milagros de la Torre" by Vince Aletti
- Art in America, July 2012 "Milagros de la Torre" by David Ebony
- Wall Street Journal, March 9, 2012 "On Photography: Shades of Reality" by William Meyers
- Arte al Dia, 2012 "Milagros de la Torre" by Laura F. Gibellini
- ArtNexus, 2012 "Milagros de la Torre" by Rafael Díaz Casas
- Visura, April 2012 "Bulletproof" by Adriana Teresa
- ARTFORUM, November 2010 "Dress Codes" by Glen Helfand
- The New York Times Style Magazine, October 15, 2009 "In Focus: Dressing Up at the ICP" by Natasha Lunn
- Beaux Art Magazine, November 2003 "Étoiles Montantes et Figures Historiques: Le Futures Stars" by Stéphane Corréard
- New York Times, April 14, 2000 “Varied Realms Thrive Uptown” by Holland Cotter
- Beaux Art Magazine, August 1993 "Les miracles de Maria," by Natacha Wolinski
