= Arturo Herrera (artist) =

Venezuelan visual artist (born 1959)

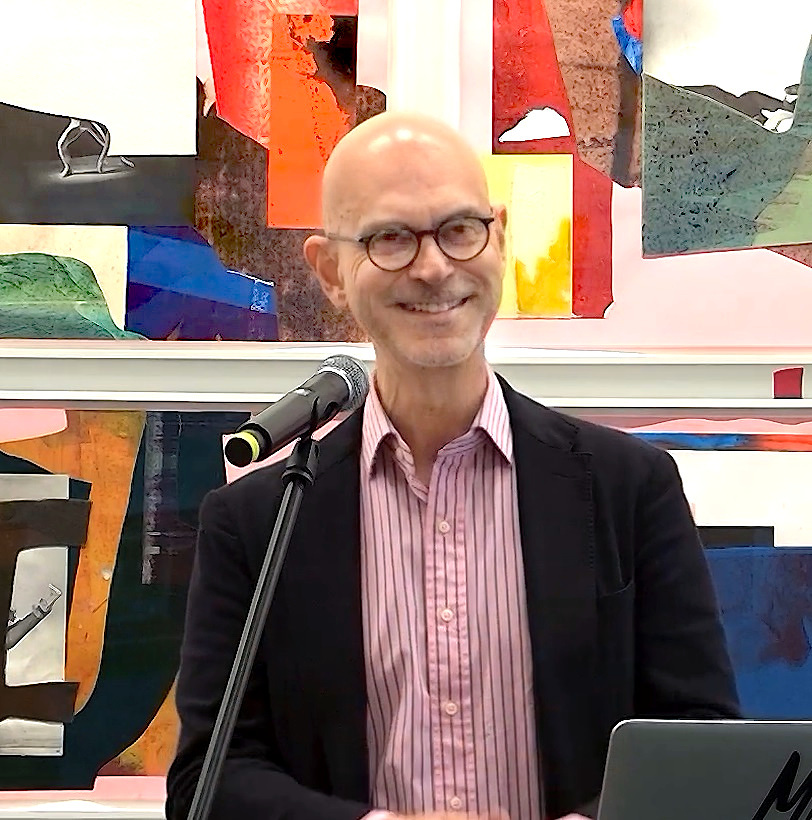
- Arturo Herrera at the Contemporary Dayton, Ohio, 2023
- Born: Arturo Herrera; 1959 (age 66–67); Caracas, Venezuela
- Education: University of Illinois at Chicago, University of Tulsa
- Known for: Collage, works on paper, public art, sculpture, painting
- Awards: Guggenheim Fellowship, DAAD Fellowship, Pollock-Krasner Foundation, Louis Comfort Tiffany Foundation, Foundation for Contemporary Arts
- Website: Arturo Herrera

Arturo Herrera, Untitled, mixed media and collage on paper, 50,4 x 39,6 cm, 2020.

Arturo Herrera (b. 1959) is a Venezuelan-born, Berlin-based visual artist known for wide-ranging work that is rooted in the practice of collage. His colorful, often rhythmic art intertwines bits of pop iconography, gestural marks, and nonrepresentational shapes using pictorial strategies of fragmentation, repetition, effacement, and dislocation. The resulting imagery often balances between abstraction and figuration (often barely legible), detached from inherent narratives yet vaguely familiar. Critics suggest that this ambiguity engages memory, fantasy and a viewer's unconscious private interpretive schemes, evoking a multiplicity of references and readings. In 2020, Art in America writer Ara H. Merjian described Herrera's practice—which includes works on paper, paintings, reliefs, sculpture, public art and books—as "chameleonic as [it] is consistent," one that "breathes life into modernist collage, exploring the tensions between exactitude and spontaneity, placement and displacement."

Herrera has exhibited at institutions including the Museum of Modern Art (MoMA), Whitney Museum, Castello di Rivoli Museum of Contemporary Art, Centre d'Art Contemporain Genève, Kunsthalle Bielefeld, Hammer Museum, and MoMA PS1. He has been recognized with Guggenheim and DAAD (German Academic Exchange Service) fellowships and awards from the Pollock-Krasner Foundation, Louis Comfort Tiffany Foundation and Artpace, among others. His work belongs to the public collections of museums including MoMA, the Metropolitan Museum of Art, Tate, Museum of Contemporary Art, Los Angeles and Museo Reina Sofia (Madrid).

== Education and career ==
Herrera was born in 1959 in Caracas, Venezuela and came to the US in 1978. He studied art at the University of Tulsa, producing paintings that mixed abstraction and representation and earning a BFA in 1982. After graduating, he traveled in Europe before moving to New York, where he began collecting coloring books, comics and illustrated fairy tales as "encyclopedias" of imagery that he cut into scraps of biomorphic forms to be collaged. In the early 1990s, he refined this process during graduate studies at the University of Illinois at Chicago (MFA, 1992).

Herrera gained recognition through solo exhibitions mixing varied media at Randolph Street Gallery, [Museum of Contemporary Art (both 1995), the Renaissance Society and Art Institute (both 1998) in Chicago; the Dia Center For The Arts (1998), MoMA PS1 (2000) and the Whitney Museum (2001) in New York; and the Hammer Museum (2001) in Los Angeles, among others. He also appeared in the 2002 Whitney Biennial and surveys at the Drawing Center, MoMA PS1 and Walker Art Center. In 1997, he relocated to New York.

In his later career, Herrera has had solo shows at Centro Galego de Arte Contemporánea (2005), The Aldrich Contemporary Art Museum (2007), Haus Am Waldsee (2010), the Albright–Knox Art Museum (2014), Tate Modern (2016), and Ruby City (2022), among others. He has exhibited at the galleries Sikkema Jenkins & Co (New York), Thomas Dane (London), Corbett vs. Dempsey (Chicago), Franco Noero (Turin), and Carlier I Gebauer (Berlin). He has lived in Berlin since 2003.

== Work and reception ==
Herrera has produced a diverse body of work in terms of medium and materials, but is best known for his mixed-media collages and works on paper, felt sculptures and site-specific wall paintings. He often works in series, exploring continuity, discontinuity and associative relationships across and within bodies of work, different physical media and exhibitions. Art historian Carolyn Christov-Bakargiev has characterized Herrera's method as reaching back through 1980s appropriation art and 1950s–1960s Pop art to the earlier 20th-century languages of surrealism, lyrical abstraction and cubist collage.

Several critics contend that he connects those movements to conceptual art through tendencies in his work—toward absence, omission and a minimum of referential cues—that test the expectations of media (painting, sculpture, collage, book) and representational systems. Pablo Helguera likened Herrera's work to Rorschach tests that hover between explicit and implicit, familiar and foreign, an effect that shifts pop-culture themes from the autobiographical to the interpretive realm. Writers such as Jessica Morgan described his early works as liminal, "childlike sites of imagination" whose sophisticated sense of psychological and cultural implications thwarted cohesive narratives but encouraged associative, impulsive readings open to repressed impulses. Herrera's later work offers a more non-linear, non-contextual interpretive encounter, conveying a postmodern sense of proliferating, fragmented imagery and the multiplicity of experience.

Arturo Herrera, Untitled, mixed media and collage on paper, 30,5 x 22,9 cm, 1998.

=== Collages ===
Herrera's early work centered on small, handcrafted series of collages in which he cut, layered and intertwined fragments from coloring books, advertisements, cartoons and fairy tales with painterly marks and abstract shapes. These images were often bizarre hybrids: Donald Duck's lower torso morphing into a Häagen-Dazs ice cream bar in a coloring book landscape; an upside-down, scribbled-over Tweety seeing a teddy bear flattened by a Wonder Bread wrapper and a phallus-shaped cutout. The splicing and destruction of the original material subverted its childhood innocence, evoking darker, provocative realms of the unconscious alluding to violence and sexuality. New York Times critic Holland Cotter wrote of Herrera's "Desire" collages (Drawing Center, 1994): "polymorphously perverse and sweet, they seem to come from the hand of a child still too naive to disguise the depths of his own aggression." Herrera involved viewers directly in the web project Almost Home (Dia Center, 1998), which used an interactive, diptych format to pair collages (some animated) from a series of 100 collages in playful, chance juxtapositions.

In later series—among them the "Keep in Touch" (2004), "Boy and Dwarf" (2006–7), "Trigger" (2009) and "An Evening with C.W." (2012)—Herrera borrowed more widely from the legacies of abstraction and modern dance, superimposing shapes, squiggles and dense color fields that recalled work by John Baldessari, Brice Marden, Robert Motherwell and Jackson Pollock onto cartoon and other found imagery. The seventy-five large, closely hung "Boy and Dwarf" collages presented a dialectical experience of containment and exploration, suggesting both portals and a tangled "forest" of painted, sprayed, stenciled and pasted-on color. Each was based on a central, human-sized cartoon character whose image was largely obliterated by layers of decorative wallpaper, screenprinting and gestural painting; they were derived from two children's book images which generated twenty abstract line drawings by Herrera that he further altered by chance and systematic processes. The moving-image work Les Noces (The Wedding) (Americas Society, 2011) featured static, black-and-white montages of abstract imagery based on 80 photographs Herrera shot of cut-up scraps in his studio, which changed rapidly to the rhythms of Igor Stravinsky's ballet-cantata of the same title.

Arturo Herrera, Band, enamel on wall, 9 x 15,54 m, 2011, NSU Art Museum, Fort Lauderdale, FL.

=== Wall paintings, felt and other sculptures ===
In the mid-1990s, Herrera extended his collage-based approach to new, often more abstract and minimal, bodies of work: site-specific wall paintings, felt sculptures and objects. In the decade that followed, he presented them in exhibitions of diverse works that played off one another and against conventional expectations with humor, biomorphic suggestion and an off-balance conceptualism. His exhibition at the Renaissance Society (1998) was characteristic. It featured two vibrant wall paintings, a textured curving slab of particleboard painted white to match the wall, a floor sculpture of twisting hose-like strands, and relief-like plaster heads of Jiminy Cricket and Pluto mounted through walls so their interior cavities and exteriors were exposed.

Herrera's wall paintings—the first for an outdoor billboard in Chicago in 1994—were seamless, hard-edged works combining appealing colors and rhythmic dances of repetitive abstract forms and vernacular imagery vaguely suggesting fantasy or narrative. Early works ranged from explicitly figurative and overtly sexual—the black contour-lined outdoor Out of Twenty-four (MCA Chicago, 1995)—to the largely abstract: the indoor Tale (Randolph Street Gallery, 1995), a continuous, varied torrent of cartoony orange blobs, billowings and curvilinear shapes. Subsequent wall paintings included All I Ask (Walker Art Center, 1999), which featured densely packed, vaguely referential, white-outlined forms on brown; When Alone Again (Hammer Museum, 2001), a gestural, red-latex-on-white work; and the spare, abstract Untitled (Wall painting for Berlin) (2005). In later wall paintings Herrera has worked in a primarily abstract vein—often lyrical dances of positive and negative or different-colored forms. They include Adam (Linda Pace Foundation, 2013); Come again (Gladstone Gallery, 2015); Half-Time (Tate Modern, 2016); and the 6,500--square-foot, outdoor wrap-around work, Wall Painting for Austin (2022).

Arturo Herrera, Each Other, wool felt, 213 x 111 cm, 2002. Linda Pace Foundation Collection.

Herrera's large felt sculptures—first produced in 1998—suggested tactile, emblems of "heroic" Abstract Expressionist paintings with incised shapes resembling drips and splatters, while simultaneously deflating that movement with a pinned, slightly sagging appearance implying a fall from grace. New York Times critic Roberta Smith described them as "melting, web-like abstractions … haunted by familiar ghosts that never declare themselves … [and] flirt openly with legibility." In more cryptic felt works, large, solid forms obscured gestural areas, evoking themes of concealment and absence (At Your Side, 2001). Later felt pieces took on simpler, figural qualities—some resembling flat, biomorphic surrealist sculptures (Orfeo, 2007), and others, garment-like forms that drooped from walls or crumpled on the floor (Felt #19, 2009).

=== Later exhibitions ===
In later exhibitions, Herrera has pushed in the direction of more complex work, often privileging form over concept and movement (bodily and formal) with references to dance and music. His exhibition at Sikkema Jenkins & Co (2014) centered on layered, sometimes disorienting, abstract hybrids of painting, collage and assemblage that included second-hand books blurred, dragged and dipped with paint and cutout pieces revealing layers sandwiched with sheets of silk-screened aluminum and found objects such as hemp tote bags. Roberta Smith described the work as more personal, experiential and riskier, exploring new "materials, processes and previous lives, while parsing the tensions between physical fact and visual effect." In his 2017 show at the same gallery, Herrera applied similar visual strategies to the painted canvas for the first time, free of collage elements.

In two exhibitions, Herrera anchored several series in modern dance as a point of departure for formal and conceptual experimentation. "Soave sia il vento" (Galleria Franco Noero, 2016)—the title a line from Mozart's opera Cosi fan tutte—blended figuration, repetition and popular culture in gallery and outdoor wall installations and a collaborative work on a neighboring apartment building; participating tenants installed monochromatic curtains depicting dancers corresponding to imagery wallpapering the gallery. His 2019 Corbett vs. Dempsey show included map-like glass works that schematized dance motifs, as well as chaotic collages that layered swatches of painted canvas, screen-printed imagery, photographs of dancers and strips of felt on pink construction paper, connecting the lyrical intersection of dancing bodies with the "dance" of form.

In "From This Day Forward" (Thomas Dane, 2021), Herrera presented dynamic collages, books and wall paintings (some floor-to-ceiling) that layered countless photographs, erratic strips of color and mural-sized shapes and incorporated the gallery space itself within its collaged framework. Writer Jasper Spires described the effect as a "phenomenological shotgun blast" and "blitz of overlapping imagery and colour" that collapsed perceptual boundaries (inside versus outside, flatness versus depth) to create an unstable, open-ended interpretive environment. The show included a 208-page book from a series of fifty-six unique exemplars, composed of uprooted, found pages from diverse publications that were overprinted with black shapes and outlines obscuring, disrupting and recasting the original images.

== Collections and recognition ==
Herrera's work belongs to the public collections of the Albright–Knox Art Museum, Art Institute of Chicago, Blanton Museum of Art, Carnegie Museum of Art, Colección Patricia Phelps de Cisneros (Caracas), Dallas Museum of Art, Hammer Museum, Metropolitan Museum of Art, MoMA, Museo Reina Sofia, Museum of Contemporary Art, Chicago, Museum of Contemporary Art, Los Angeles, Museum of Fine Arts Boston, National Gallery of Canada, Norton Museum of Art, Pérez Art Museum Miami, San Francisco Museum of Modern Art, Staatliche Museen zu Berlin, Tate, Walker Art Center and Whitney Museum, among others.

Herrera has been awarded fellowships from the John S. Guggenheim Foundation (2005), DAAD (Deutscher Akademischer Austausch Dienst) (Germany, 2003) Yaddo (2002), Artpace (1998) and the Illinois Arts Council (1996). He has received grants from the Foundation for Contemporary Arts (2005), Elizabeth Foundation for the Arts (1999), Pollock-Krasner Foundation (1998), Louis Comfort Tiffany Foundation (1997), Marie Walsh Sharpe Art Foundation (1997), Art Matters (1996) and the Chicago Department of Cultural Affairs (1995).
