= Into Thin Air (disambiguation) =

Into Thin Air is a 1997 book by Jon Krakauer.

Into Thin Air may also refer to:

== Books ==
- Into Thin Air, a novel by Caroline Leavitt
- Into Thin Air, a 2004 collected edition of the comics series The Pulse
- Into Thin Air, a mystery novel by Thomas Zigal
- Into Thin Air, U.S. title of a 1957 crime novel by British author Harry Carmichael (a pen name of Leo Ognall)

== Music ==
- Into Thin Air, a song by Trickside

== Television ==
- Into Thin Air: Death on Everest, a 1997 American TV movie based on Krakauer's book
- Into Thin Air (TV series), a 2005 Hong Kong drama series
- "Into Thin Air" (Alfred Hitchcock Presents), an episode of Alfred Hitchcock Presents
- "Into Thin Air", an episode of Astro Boy

== See also ==
- Thin Air (disambiguation)
