= Pace Foods =

Producer of canned salsas based in Texas

- Type: Private
- Industry: Food
- Founded: 1947; 79 years ago
- Founder: David Pace
- Fate: Merged to Campbell's in 1995, became a brand
- Headquarters: Paris, Texas, U.S.
- Area served: Worldwide
- Products: Salsas
- Parent: Campbell's
- Website: campbells.com/pace

Pace Foods is a producer of a variety of canned salsas located in Paris, Texas. The company was founded in 1947 by David Pace when he developed a recipe for a salsa he called "Picante sauce" (picante means 'spicy' in Spanish), which was "made with the freshest ingredients, harvested and hand-selected in peak season to achieve the best flavor and quality".

In 1995, the company was acquired by Campbell's for $1.115 billion.

== History ==
David Pace grew up in Louisiana, learning the operations of his family's syrup business. He earned a football scholarship to Tulane University, where he played in the first Sugar Bowl in 1937 and earned his undergraduate degree in science. During World War II pilot training school brought him to San Antonio, Texas, where he returned after his discharge in 1945 and began a career in the food industry.

Pace began his own food business of bottled syrups, as well as jellies and jams. All of these products were made, packed and shipped out of a small space in the back of a liquor store that he and his wife, Margaret, rented. Over time, he expanded the business to a variety of other condiments. In 1947 he decided the real "syrup of the Southwest" was Mexican picante sauce—which is now known as salsa or picante sauce.

Starting with a basic recipe, he experimented with different blends of ingredients. He tested the results on his golf buddies, before settling on one mix of jalapeños, onions and tomatoes. He named his creation "picante" sauce—Spanish for "piquant", meaning "flavorful" or "spicy".

While continuing to sell some 58 assorted condiments, he continued modifying his picante sauce formula for the better part of a decade. As demand grew, Pace dropped the rest of the company's lines and focused on Picante sauce. He marketed Picante sauce to restaurants, using it during his meals, and leaving it behind on the table for other patrons and the restaurant owners to try when he was done. Using a $150,000 loan from Margaret's mother, the couple expanded and built their production facility in 1951.

David and Margaret Pace were divorced in 1976. In 1977, David sold the company to his former wife Margaret. In 1982, Margaret sold Pace to her daughter Linda Pace and son-in-law Christopher "Kit" Goldsbury. Linda and Kit divorced in 1987 and in 1989, Kit purchased his ex-wife's portion of Pace and became the sole owner. Goldsbury had worked at Pace since 1969. As sole owner, he increased the sales of the product including pushing the brand nationally, expanding the product line, modernizing manufacturing and using novel advertising. Campbell Soup Company acquired Pace Foods in 1995.

=== Chili pepper development ===
When he started selling his salsa, Pace looked for a supplier for peppers. He tried growing his own jalapeños, but deer would continually eat them, reducing his supply. Eventually, he began buying his peppers directly from local farmers. Later, the company began following the "jalapeño trail", buying from different regions according to the harvest season, before developing their own pepper seeds. Today it uses more than 25 million pounds of jalapeños every year—more than anyone else in the country. The company produces half a million pounds of the sauce daily as of the 1990s.

== Lines ==
=== Picante sauce ===
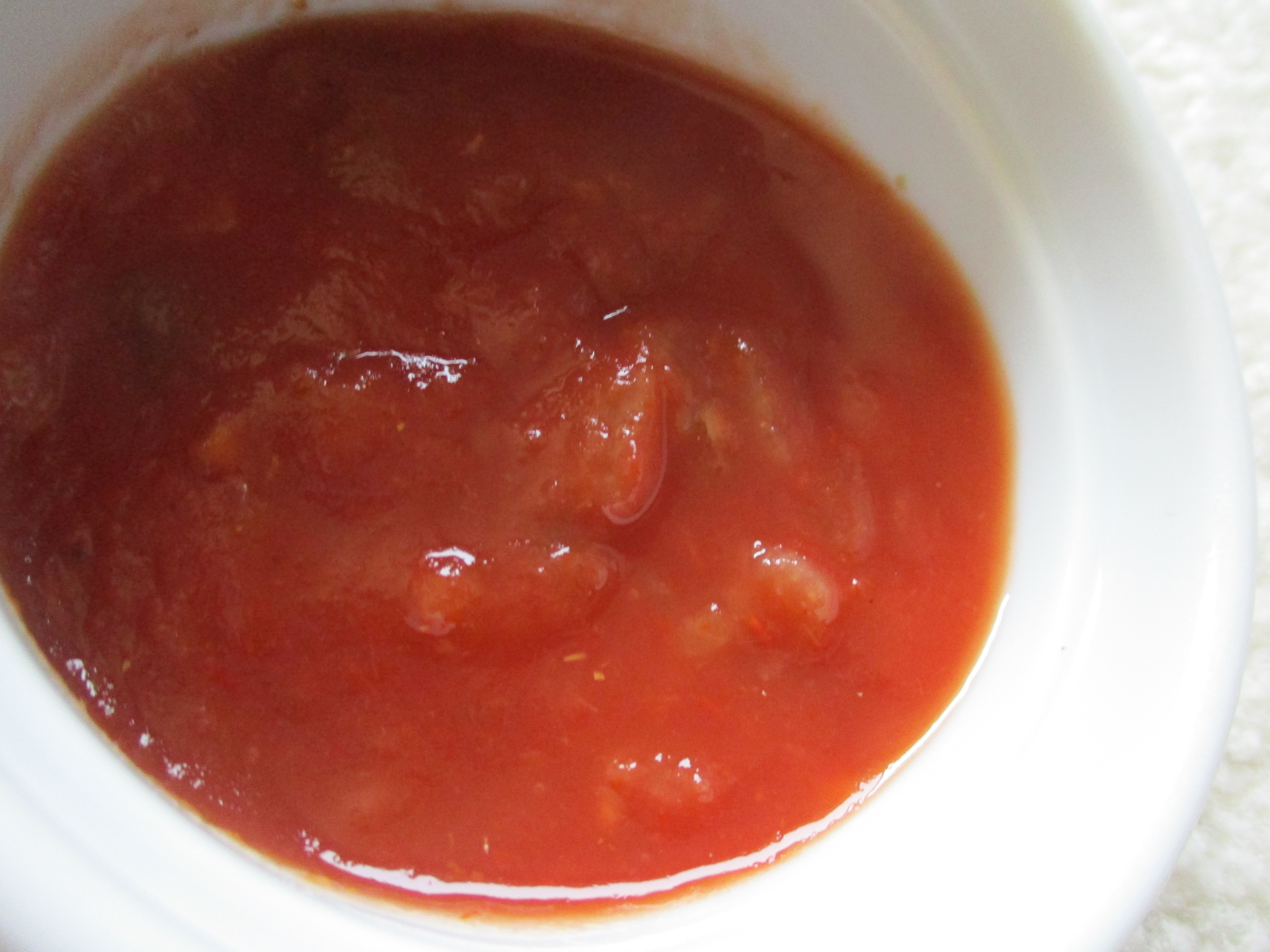
The original Picante sauce from Pace Foods has visible chunks of green bell pepper and white onion.

The original sauce made from jalapeños, onions and tomatoes is now sold as "the Original Picante Sauce". The Mild and Hot varieties of Pace's Picante sauce were added in 1981 to accompany the original Medium variety. "Thick & Chunky", introduced in 1989, later became "Chunky Salsa".

=== Specialty salsas ===
Pace Foods introduced a new line of specialty salsas in 2008. The specialty salsas include:

- Salsa Verde: Jalapeños and chunks of tomatillos, seasoned with a lime and smoked Spanish paprika.
- Pico De Gallo: Like traditional pico de gallo, with jalapeños, onions, diced tomatoes and cilantro.
- Mexican Four Cheese Salsa Con Queso: With four cheeses—Monterey Jack, Cheddar, Asadero and Queso Blanco, plus jalapeños, red peppers and onion.
- Pineapple Mango Chipotle Salsa: Medium-heat salsa with pineapple and mango. In a chipotle adobo - a tomato sauce made with garlic, onion and smoked jalapeños.
- Black Bean & Roasted Corn Salsa: A blend of black beans with fire-roasted corn and red peppers. With lime and chipotle spice.

New for 2014:

- Pace Fire Mango & Habanero Salsa and Pace Fire Chipotle & Jalapeño Salsa

== Awards ==
Pace Picante Sauce and Salsas took top honors for their categories in Chile Pepper magazine's 2009 Fiery Food Challenge and the 2009 Fiery Foods & BBQ Show's Scovie Awards Competition. Pace took a total of 12 awards, including first-place awards for Pace Picante sauce - Hot and Pace Salsa Verde.
