= Thin Air =

Thin Air may refer to:

- Thin Air (album), a 2009 album by Peter Hammill
- Thin Air Community Radio (KYRS), a low-powered radio station in Spokane, Washington
- Thin Air (Morgan novel), a 2018 science fiction novel by Richard K. Morgan
- Thin Air (Parker novel), a 1995 Spenser novel by Robert B. Parker
  - Thin Air, a 2000 Spenser TV film based on the novel
- Thin Air (Star Trek), a 2000 Star Trek: New Earth novel by Dean Wesley Smith and Kristine Kathryn Rusch
- "Thin Air" (Waking the Dead), a 2002 television episode
- Winnipeg International Writers Festival or THIN AIR, an annual literary festival
- Thin Air, a story arc in the comics series The Pulse
- "Thin Air", a song by Keane, a B-side of the single "Nothing in My Way"
- "Thin Air", a song by Pearl Jam from the album Binaural
- "Thin Air", a song by Olivia Holt from the EP Olivia
- Thin Air, a composition made by Calliope Tsoupaki

== See also ==
- Into Thin Air (disambiguation)
- Out of Thin Air (disambiguation)
- Thin airfoil theory, a theory on airfoils
