= Out of Thin Air =

Out of Thin Air may refer to:

- Out of Thin Air, a 2017 documentary about the Guðmundur and Geirfinnur case
- Out of Thin Air, the first episode of 2014 documentary The Mystery of Matter
- "Out of Thin Air", a song by Howard Jones from Cross That Line
- "Out of Thin Air", a song from the 1996 film Aladdin and the King of Thieves
- "Out of Thin Air", an episode of Black Scorpion
- Out of Thin Air: The Brief Wonderful Life of Network News, a 1991 memoir by Reuven Frank

== See also ==
- Thin Air (disambiguation)
