= Martin Friedman (museum director) =

American museum director (1925–2016)

- Born: September 23, 1925; Pittsburgh, Pennsylvania
- Died: May 9, 2016 (aged 90)
- Education: B.A. University of Washington; M.A. in studio art and art history University of California, Los Angeles
- Occupations: Curator; writer
- Known for: Director of Walker Art Center

Martin Lee Friedman (September 23, 1925 – May 9, 2016) was an American museum curator who spent the majority of his career as the director of the Walker Art Center and oversaw the opening of the Minneapolis Sculpture Garden and was awarded the National Medal of Arts in 1989.

== Early life ==
Friedman was born in Pittsburgh, Pennsylvania] Friedman earned his bachelor's degree at the University of Washington. He earned a Master of Arts in studio art and art history at University of California, Los Angeles. After graduation, Friedman spent the beginnings of his career teaching art in high schools and colleges around Los Angeles. His transition into curating began after winning a fellowship to study African art in Belgium. Upon finishing the fellowship, Friedman was hired on as a curator at the Walker Art Center in 1958.

== Walker Art Center ==
The Walker Art Center in Minneapolis, Minnesota, had been around since 1879. The museum originated to showcase the private gallery of lumber baron T. B. Walker in his home and was formally established as the Walker Art Gallery in 1927. While some acquisitions were made between this time and Friedman's hire in 1958, the museum did not begin to take shape until after Friedman began work at the museum. In 1961, Friedman became the director of the museum at the age of 36. He is largely credited for making the museum what it is today. Art critic Richard Eder described Friedman as "a mixture of professor, Puck, and P. T. Barnum". Eder went on to credit Friedman for turning the Walker into "one of the finest modern art museums in America." In his 30 year tenure, Friedman oversaw myriad improvements, additions and acquisitions by the museum. Most notably, he oversaw the creation of the new Walker Art Center in 1971 and the Minneapolis Sculpture Garden in 1988. Friedman was known for being detailed about every aspect of the museum. During the construction of the new art center, Friedman rejected entire shipments of brick for having slightly askew glaze. He also would repeatedly change the shade of grey or white paint in a gallery to match the corresponding art and even had crews shovel over dirty snow.

== Retirement and legacy ==
Friedman informally retired to Manhattan in 1990. In his later years, Friedman continued to write about the art world and oversaw smaller projects such as sculpture collections at Madison Square Park. In 1988, Friedman was awarded the National Medal of Arts by President George H. W. Bush. Friedman mentored many curators during his tenure that went on to prominent roles in the art world. Adam Weinberg, the current director of the Whitney Museum of American Art, described himself as a protege of Friedman. Weinberg said of Friedman, “Martin understood that the power of a museum comes from giving voice to artists as well as showcasing their art. He was a major voice for artists and a real champion of freedom of expression.” In 2016, Friedman died at the age of 90.
