= Europa Press =

Spanish news agency

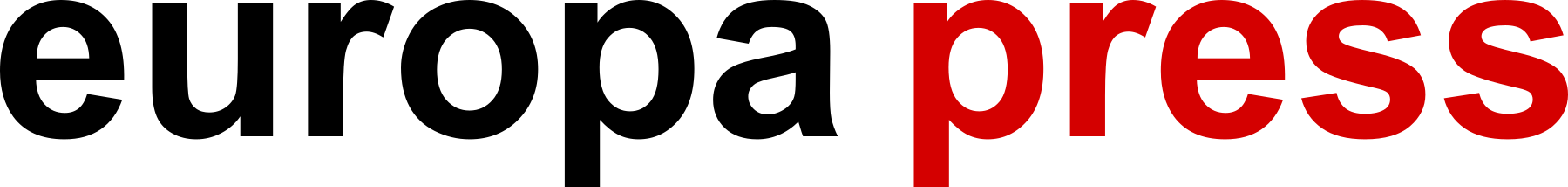
- Industry: News media
- Founded: 1953
- Founder: Torcuato Luca de Tena
- Headquarters: Madrid, Spain
- Products: Wire service
- Website: europapress.es

Europa Press is a Spanish news agency founded in 1953. It broadcasts news 24 hours a day, publishing 3,000 articles on average per day. Originally founded as a book distribution company by five monarchists, Europa Press became a news agency in 1966. It is a competitor to the state-run news agency, Agencia EFE.

== History ==
On September 23, 1953, Torcuato Luca de Tena published in ABC that Lavrenti Pavlovich Beria, leader of the Soviet police, was in Spain following the death of Joseph Stalin. Since no one could verify the information, Luca de Tena was dismissed. When he was thirty, he decided to write books and pamphlets, founding an individual agency called Agencia Europea, where he hired his colleagues Florentino Pérez Embid, Andrés Rueda, Lluis Valls, Gonzalo Fernández de la Mora and Javier García Vinuesa, with the aim of creating and spreading material containing pictures summarizing successful theatre plays or movies.

The name 'Europa' responds to the European vocation of this founding group. At the beginning, the name was accompanied with 'Documents and International reports'. Four years later, in 1957, due to prosperous business activity, Luca de Tena registered the company as Agencia Europa Press, as it is still called today. The first logotype represented Zeus transformed into a bull while he is capturing Europe, and in turn it represented Europe as an ideal political and social region.

This project was initially associated with Florentino Pérez Embid, Andrés Rueda, Luis Valls, Gonzalo Fernández de la Mora, Javier García Vinuesa, Antonio Fontán and Ángel Benito, among others. The agency has had four head offices, always in Madrid and is presently located at Paseo de la Castellana.

In 1963, Antonio Herrero Losada was named director, a post he held until his retirement from active journalism in 1989. That same year, increased revenue along with the change of the head office led to substantial growth in the following years. In 1966, Europa Press started its informative service, competing with agencies like EFE, Logos, Pyresa, Fiel or Mencheta. A key person entered in the agency in 1968: Francisco Martín Fernández de Heredia. His personal and professional activities held the company avoid a shutdown in 1969. At the same time, he strengthened the business project in the following years until it became the solid multimedia group that it is today.

Despite the political pressures suffered, mainly in the second part of 1960s, especially from the Information and Tourism Ministry, run by Manuel Fraga (he wanted the agency to merge with EFE and he even asked clients to end their contracts with Europa Press), the agency made it through in part thanks to Francisco Martín, who had been named managing director shortly before this conflict. Francisco Martín (1922–2011) continued playing a fundamental role in the company's growth over the next few decades until the end of the 1990s when he delegated his functions to his descendants.

In 1970, Europa Press started a new service that was called "Economic Summary", concerning political and economic information of the day and was later distributed by post to the clients. This information was easily transmitted because it circumvented the censorship that official channels suffered at that time. During the 1970s, Europa Press achieved some of its major successes, such as providing the worldwide exclusive of the death of the dictator Francisco Franco and on the following year the designation of Adolfo Suárez as Prime Minister of Spain. The press coverage of the disease and death of Francisco Franco resulted with the National Journalism Award in 1975.

In the 1990s, the agency started its territorial expansion and opened business delegations in each one of the autonomous communities of Spain, as well as created services in Catalan, Basque, Galician and Asturian.

In 2005, the platform "Desayunos Informativos" was created. It was one of the first forums for debates in Spain. Presidents of the Government, ministers, presidents of Autonomous Communities, High State Institutions and foreign Prime Ministers have been some of the public figures that have participated in the "Desayunos".

In 2012, it was published that Europa Press has closed three years in negative equity because of the loss of clients and the reduction of its sponsorships; many of them were institutional or depended on public companies. The agency implemented a strategy based on the control of expenses and on April 11 fired 7 workers, 36 hours after of knowing that Journalist Union of Madrid called for syndical elections in three companies of the group.

== Areas ==
The Europa Press group is made up of several independent limited-liability companies, built around seven areas of business:

- Europa Press Noticias
  - Notimérica (Noticias de América Latina)
- Europa Press Televisión
- Europa Press Reportajes
- Europa Press Comunicación
- Europa Press Internet
- Europa Press Ediciones
- Europa Press.Net

== Key personnel ==
- Patri Cutie
- Antonio Herrero Losada: Was the director who could show truth, freedom of speech, and courageousness to the editors. He faced penalties that threatened his position. When he retired in 1989, he wrote about the history of the Europa Press, though he died before he could finish in August 1992.
- José Mario Armero Alcántara: He was president of Europa Press during decades after the end of the Francoist Spain. He was an important figure to the Spanish transition to democracy, serving for Juan Carlos I and Adolfo Suárez. Armero Alcántar carried on writing the history of the agency which Herrero Losada started.
- Francisco Martín Fernández Heredia: He was president of Junta de Fundadores, chief executive officer and then president of Europa Press after the death of Armero Alcántara. Fernández Heredia administrated the resources of the agency. He sent a letter to Carrero Blanco so he help save the agency. At the beginning of 2007, Fernández Heredia planned to finish writing the history of the agency, but it was finished by Jesús Frías Alonso.

== Bibliography ==
- Frías Alonso, Jesús (2012). De Europa a Europa: 30 años de historia vividos desde la noticia (in Spanish). Palabra. p. 656. ISBN 9788498407457.
