= Linda Pace =

American artist and philanthropist (1945–2007

- Born: April 17, 1945; San Antonio, Texas
- Died: July 2, 2007 (aged 62); San Antonio, Texas
- Education: Southern Methodist University, University of Texas at Austin, Trinity University
- Occupations: Artist, food magnate, heiress, philanthropist
- Organization: Artpace
- Family: Emma Koehler (great-aunt); Robert Willson (artist) (step-father)

Linda Pace (17 April 1945–2 July 2007) was an American artist, food magnate, heiress, and philanthropist who founded Artpace. She was born to parents who owned Pace Foods and took over the company with her husband Christopher “Kit” Goldsbury, before selling it to Kit after divorcing him.

Pace created Chris Park in her home town of San Antonio, in memory of her son Chris, who died of a drug overdose in 1997.

== Early life and education ==
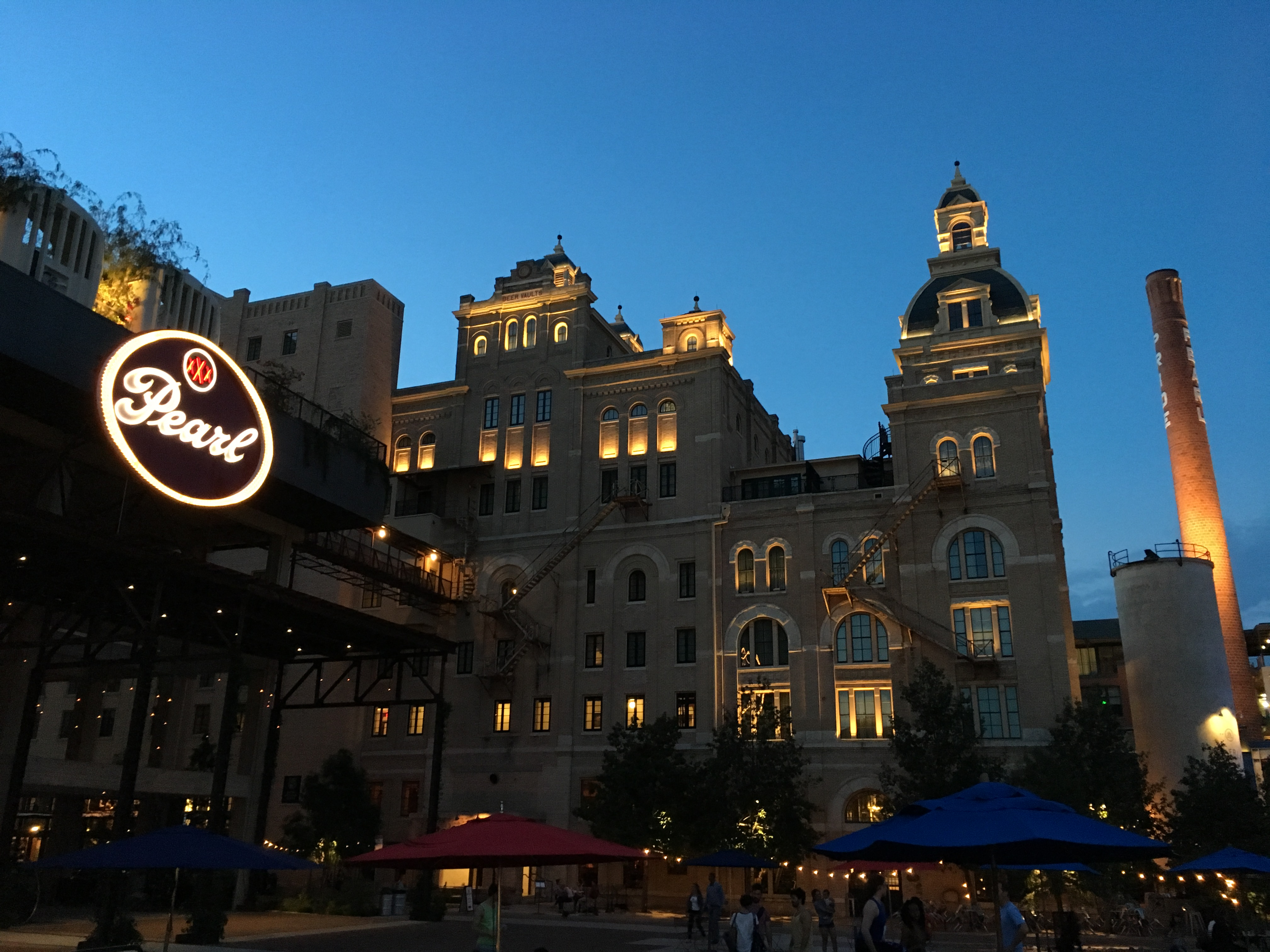
Her great-aunt's Pearl Brewing Company, San Antonio

Linda Pace was born in San Antonio, Texas on April 17, 1945 to father David Earl Pace and mother Margaret Emma (née: Bosshardt) Pace. Her mother was an artist and parents were the owners of Pace Foods. Her maternal great-aunt was Emma Koehler, the German-American businesswoman behind Pearl Brewing Company.

She attended Travis Elementary School in Monte Vista before starting the private Saint Mary’s Hall college preparatory high school for girls in 1962. Later the same year, she started studying art Southern Methodist University, transferring to University of Texas at Austin in 1966.

== Adult life ==
Pace married Christopher “Kit” Goldsbury on June 16, 1967. They had two children Margaret (Mardie) Marie and Chris. She attended Trinity University while working as a home maker, graduating in 1980 with a degree in art while Kit worked at Pace Foods.

After her parents amicably divorced, they named Kit as the president of Pace Foods. Pace and Kit bought Pace Foods from Pace's mother in September 1982. The year earlier her mother married Robert Willson. From 1982, Linda used her art to direct marketing campaigns at Pace Foods, resulting in corporate growth. Pace launched landscaping company Green Expectations in the 1980s while volunteering at the San Antonio AIDS Foundation. She divorced Kit in 1991, and sold him her share of Pace Foods. He later became a billionaire after selling the company to the Campbell's in 1994.

Pace later had a brief marriage to Dick Roberts and worked with her mother at her mother's San Antonio’s Southwest School of Art and Craft (later known as the Southwest School of Art). Pace learned to weld at the San Antonio Art Institute; her metal sculpture Red Project was displaced in the San Antonio Museum of Art in 2001.

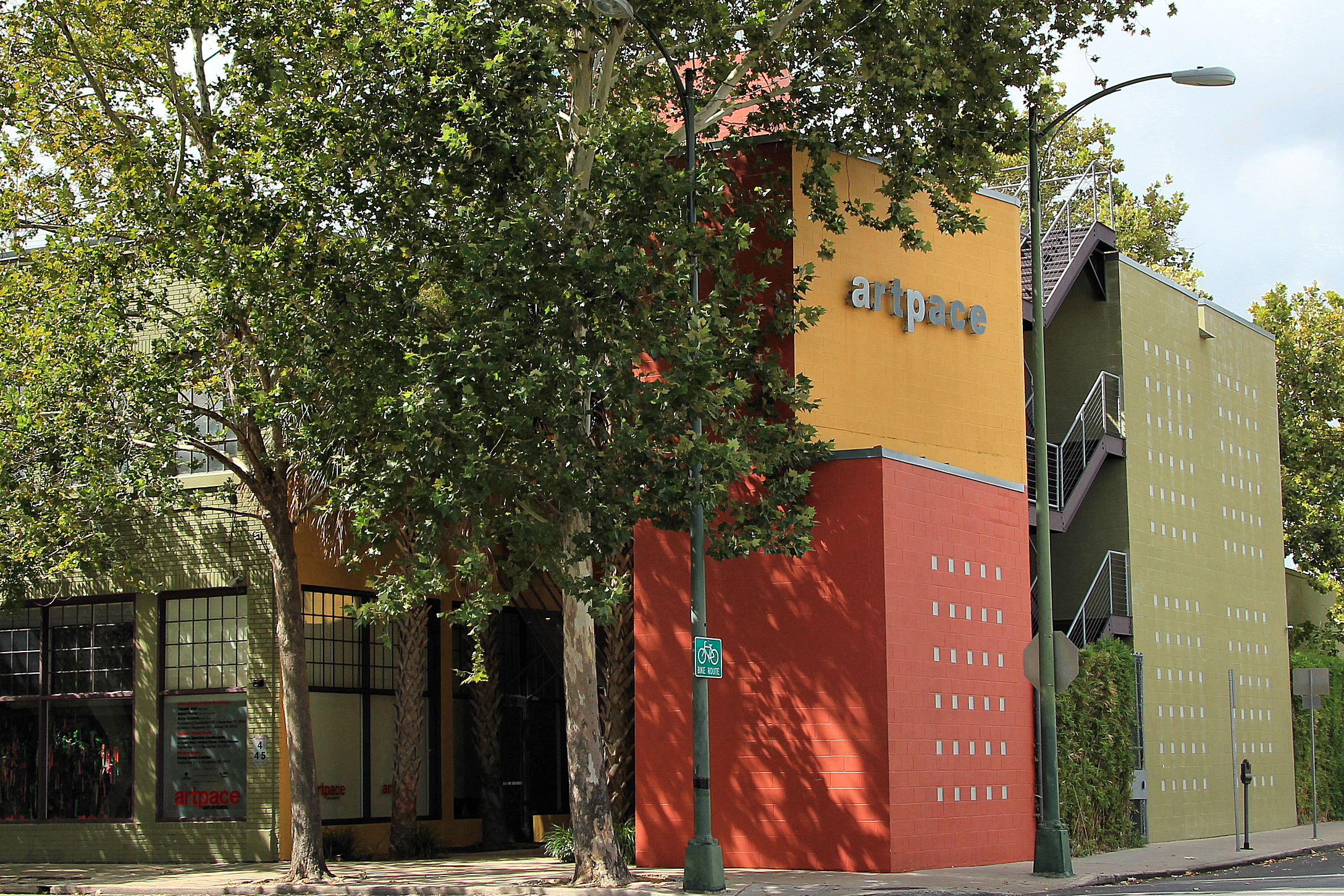
Artpace

Pace served the board of directors of the San Antonio Art Institute (from 1989) and the National Council of the Aspen Art Museum. She launched the Pace-Roberts Foundation for Contemporary Art in 1993, the organization was renamed as the Linda Pace Foundation after her death. Through her foundation she founded the art museum Artpace in 1995 in a former Hudson car dealership premises.

In 1997, following the death of her son Chris Pace, she created the one-acre Chris Park in his memory. Chris died of a drug overdose.

== Death and legacy ==
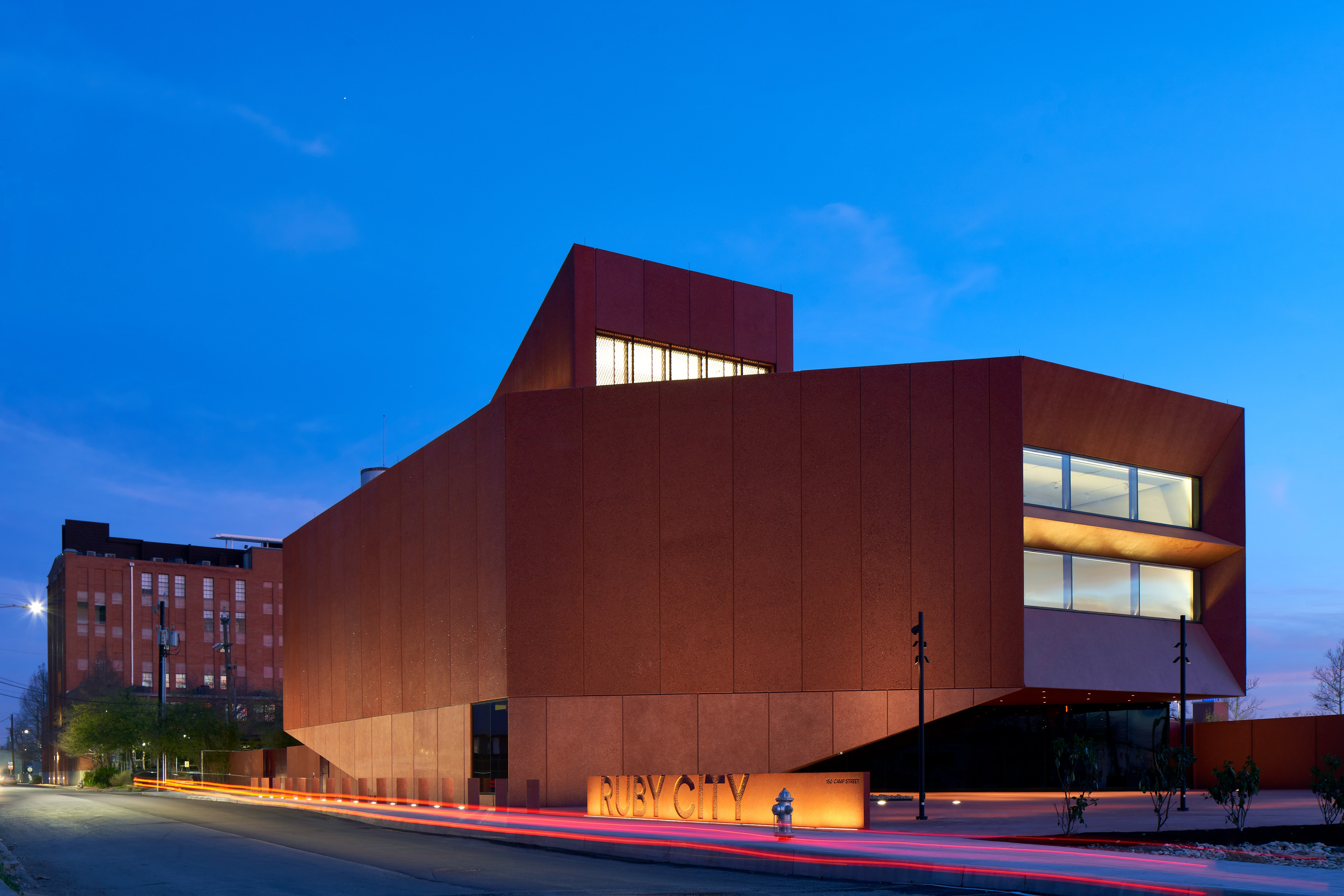
Ruby City

Pace died of breast cancer on July 2, 2007. Her collection of 1,400 pieces of art, owned by the Linda Pace Foundation is on display in the Ruby City, museum, funded by the Linda Pace Foundation.
