= Enric Pladevall-Vila =

Spanish artist

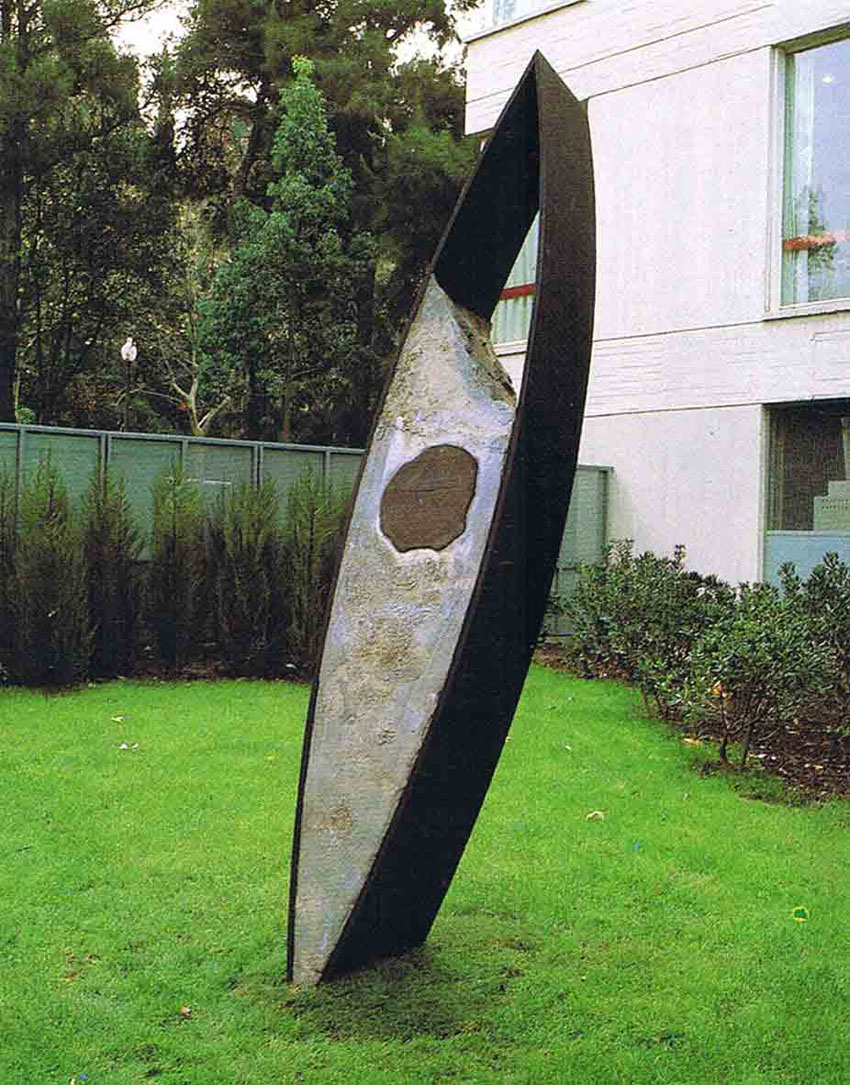
- Gran Fus, in the sculpture garden next to Barcelona's Fundació Joan Miró
- Born: 1951 (age 74–75); Vic
- Education: Fine Arts School, Barcelona
- Known for: Sculpture
- Notable work: Gran Fus; Tità Amantis
- Website: pladevall.com

Enric Pladevall (born 1951 in Vic) is a Catalan sculptor.

== Biography ==
Pladevall was born in 1951 in Vic, Barcelona and in 1968 he entered Barcelona's Fine Arts school. His prolific career as a sculptor is acknowledged with important scholarships and awards. His artistic accomplishments are well established in both national and international fields. His work has been exhibited at Barcelona's Fundació Joan Miró, the Maeght gallery as well as in Italy, France, South Africa, Singapore, Australia, the United States and Japan. He has got public sculptures in Korea, Barcelona, Vic, Manresa, Reus, El Prat de Llobregat and Girona. Some of his most valued sculptures are Androgyne Planet at Atlanta's Centennial Olympic Park, and L'arbre de la Vida ("The tree of life"), at Barcelona's Cosmocaixa. Also, Pladevall's sculptures can be found at museums worldwide, such as MACBA, Museo Reina Sofia, Cuenca's Museo de Arte Abstracto Español, Fundación Juan March, The Lehigh Art Gallery Museum of Pennsylvania, the Atlanta History Center or the Urban Redevelopment Authority Collection in Singapore.

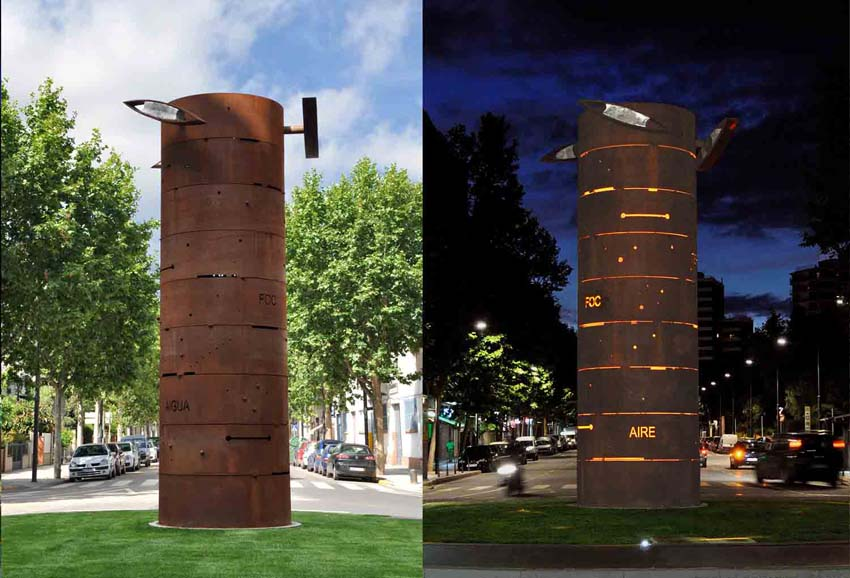
Constalació. Iron, zinc and stone. Hommage to Joan Vinyoli (Reus)

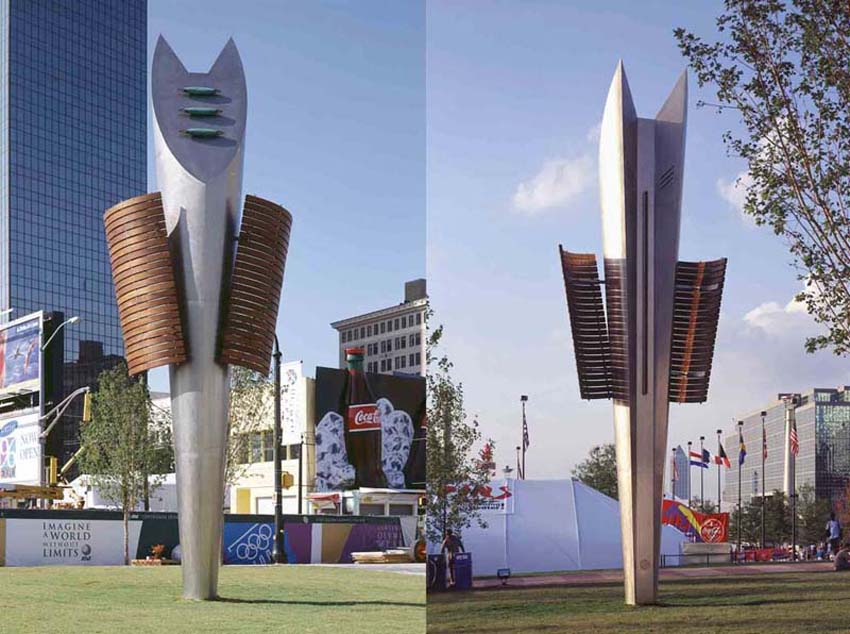
Androgyne planet. Steel, wood, and bronze, 9 m. height. Centennial Olympic Park, Atlanta

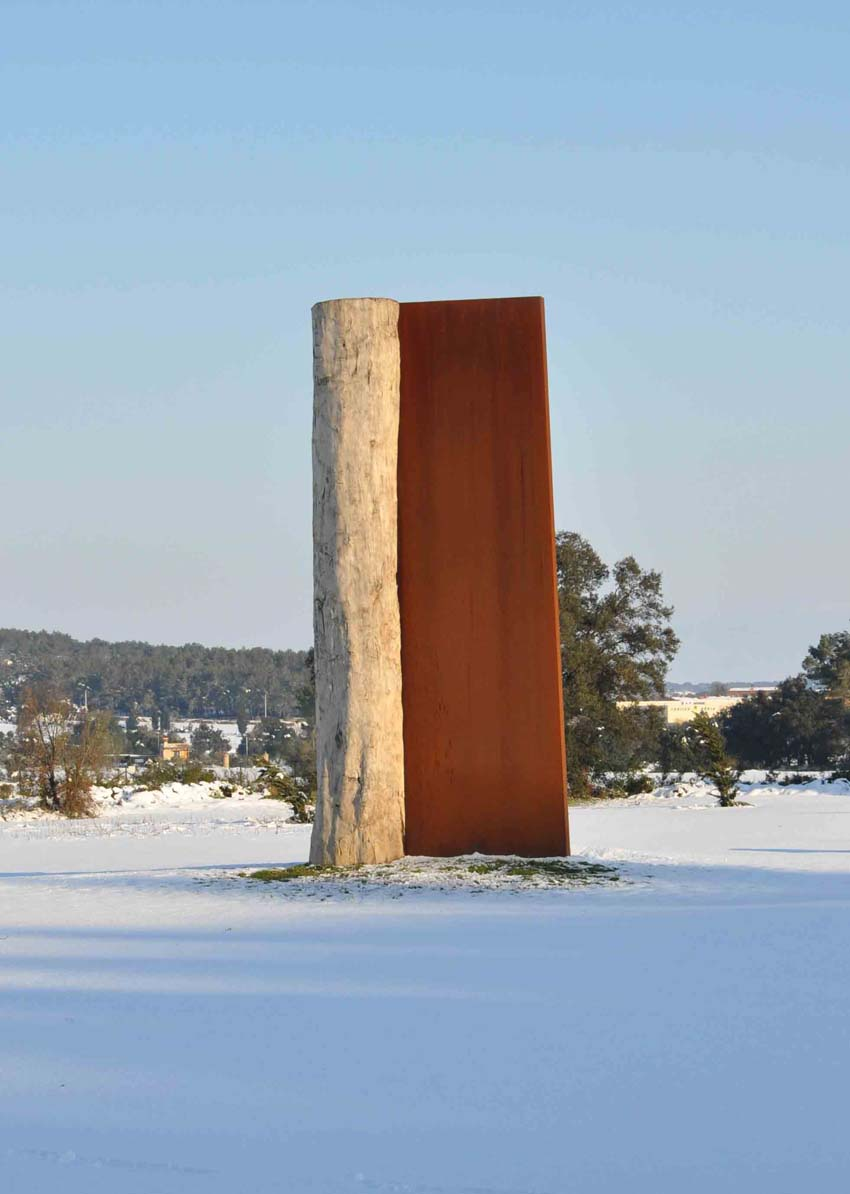
Tità Amantis, in Ventalló

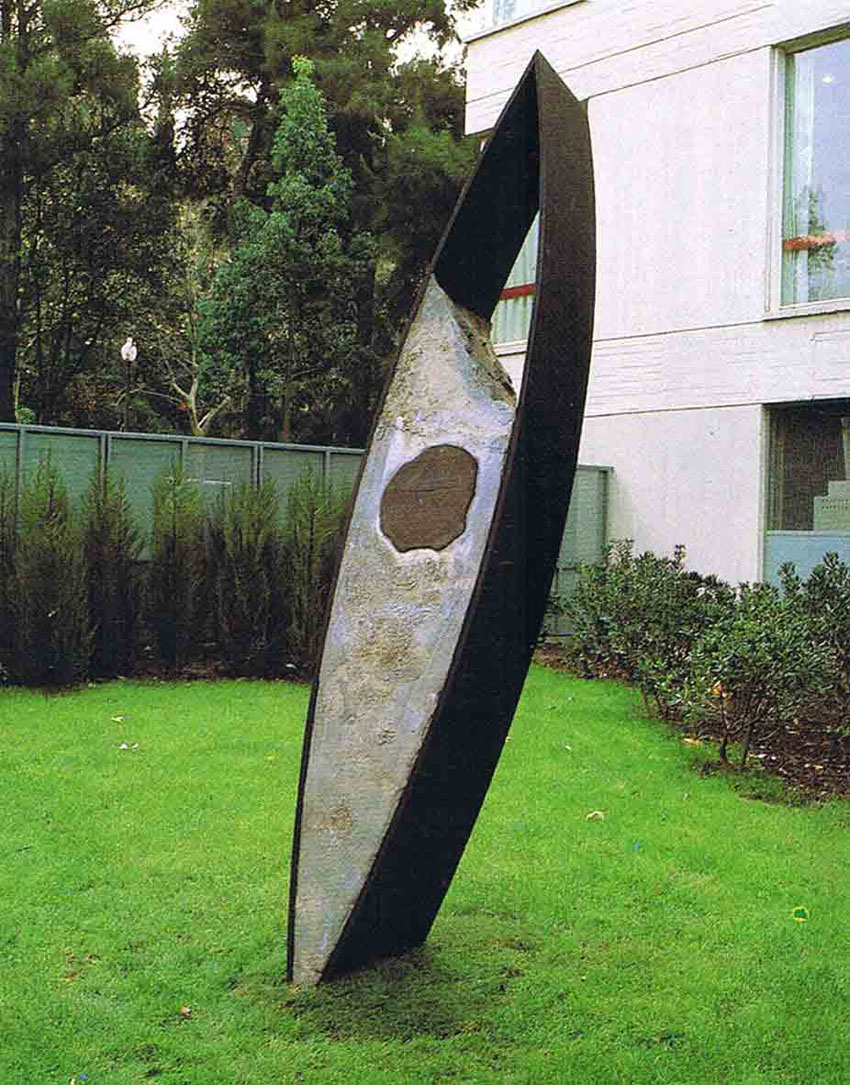
Gran fus, in the sculpture garden next to Barcelona's Fundació Joan Miró

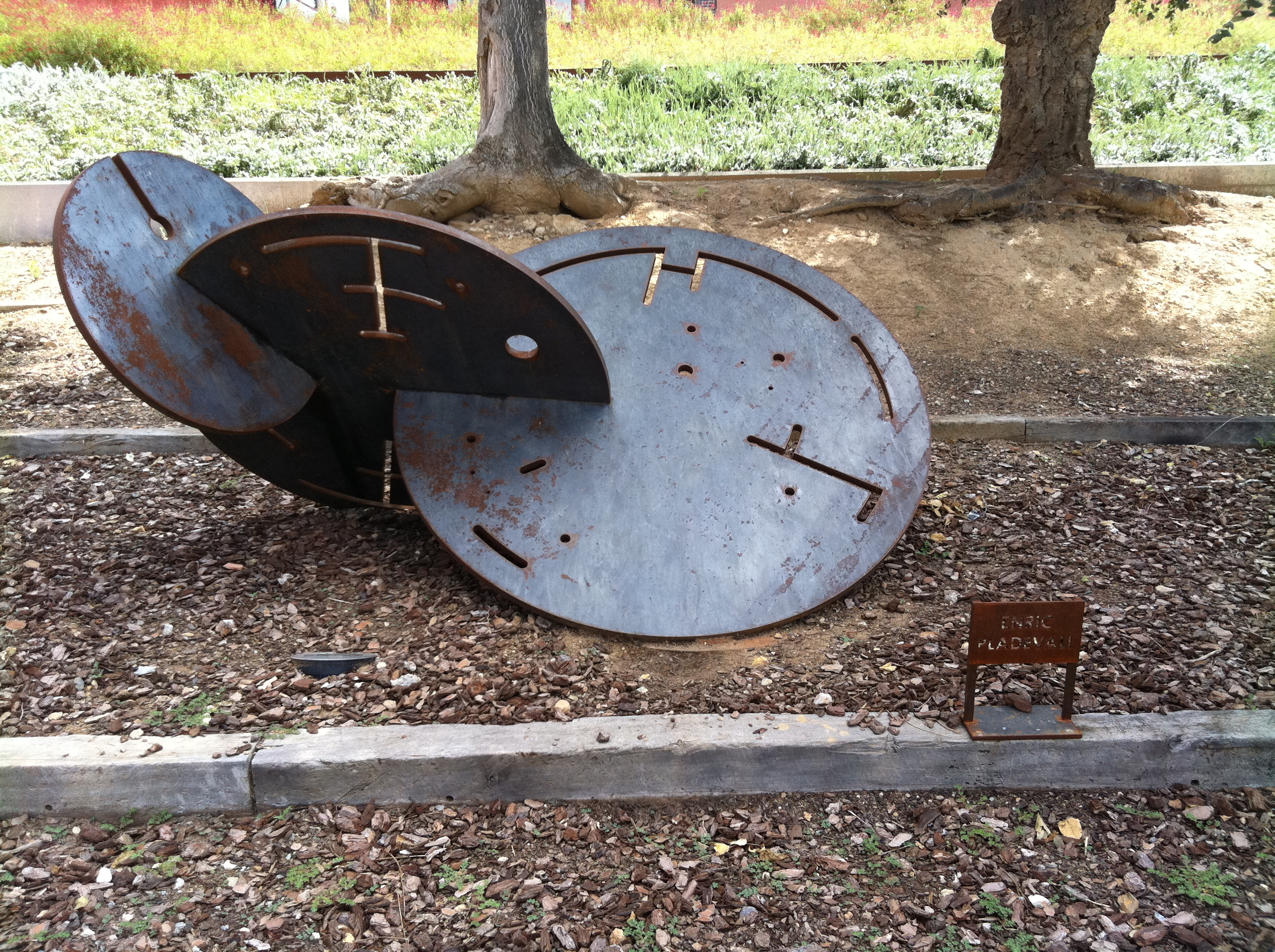
Plaça Can Mario sculpture garden, Palafrugell

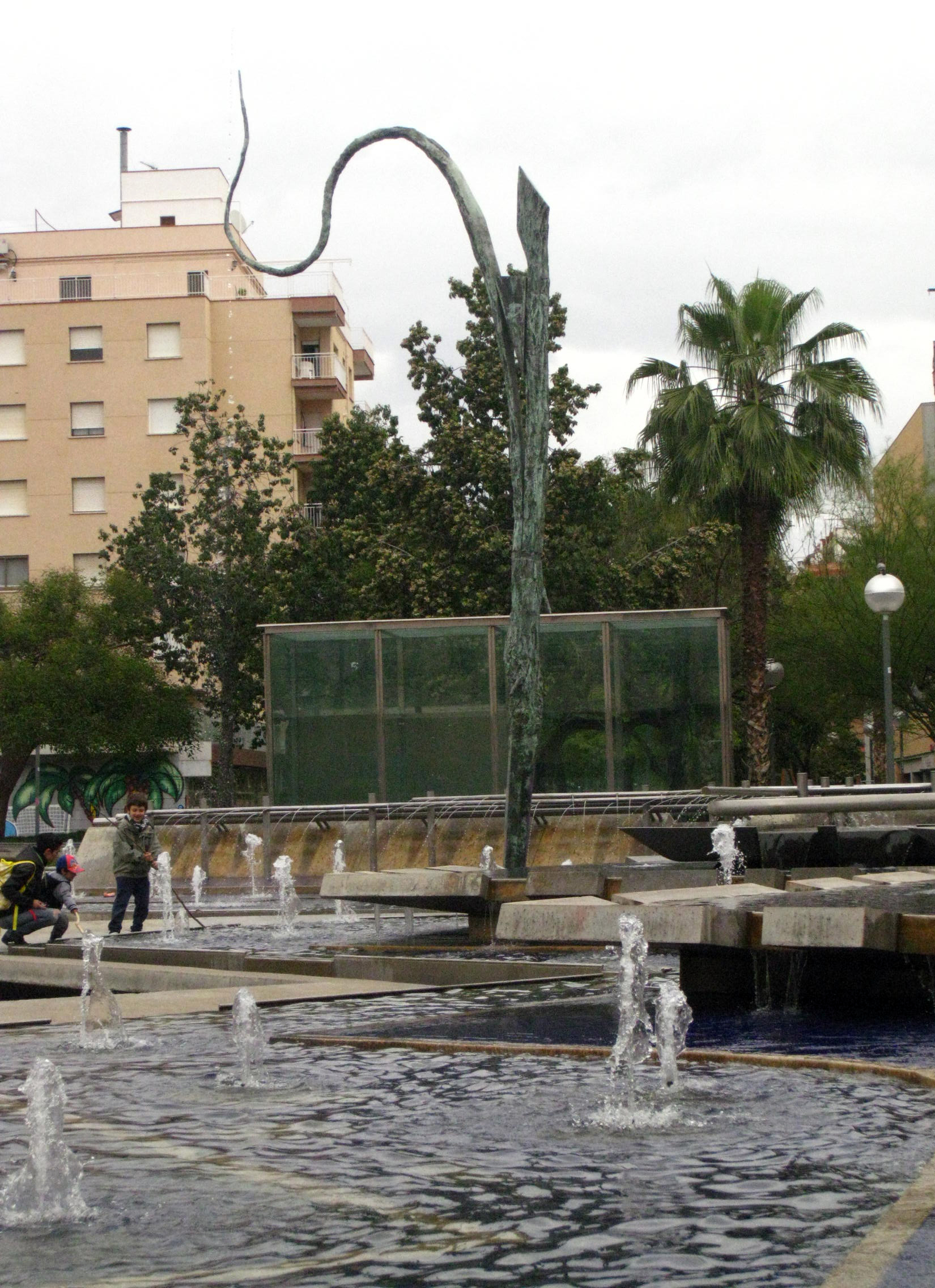
Font Mutant, Barcelona
