= Ruby City (San Antonio) =

Texas art museum

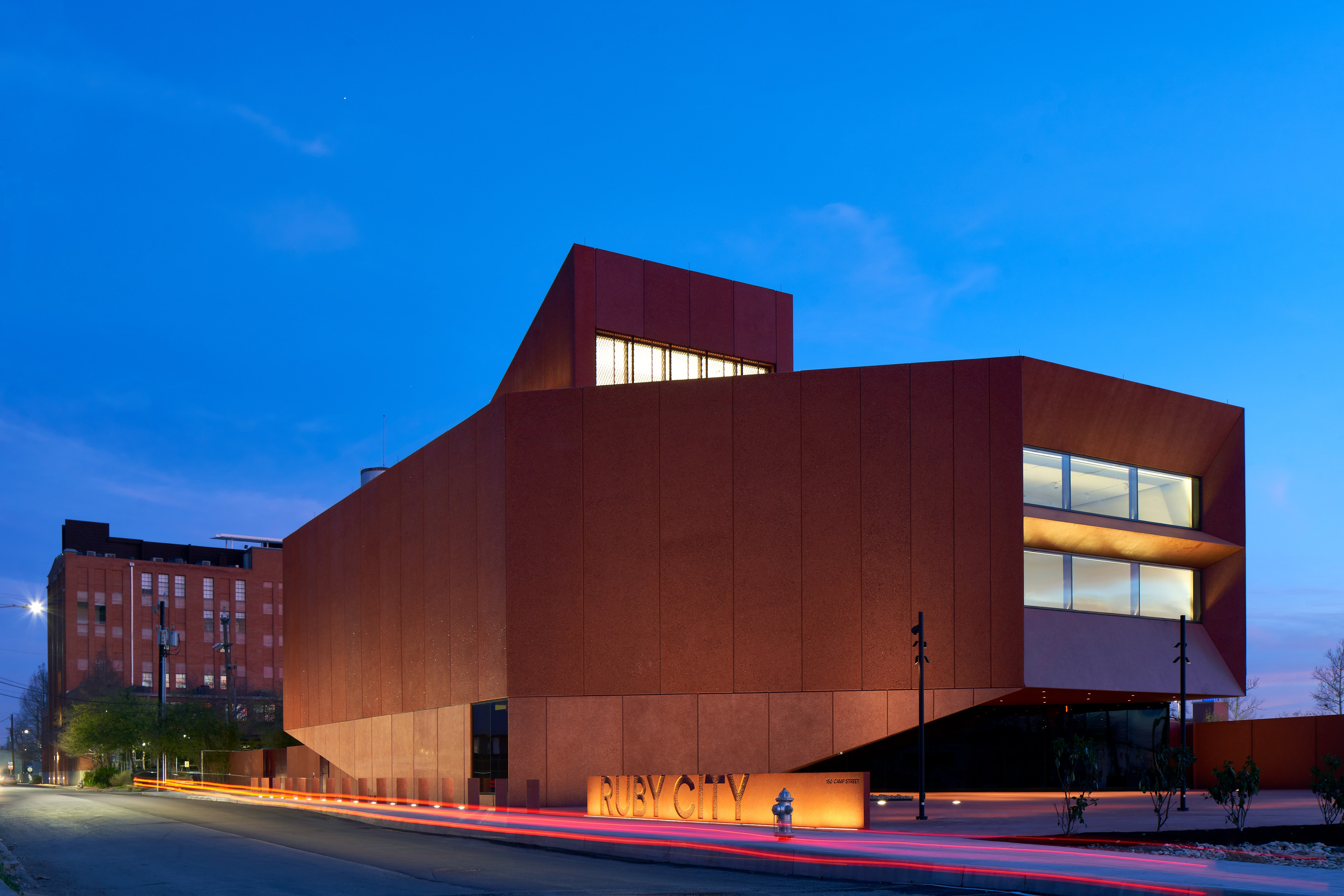
- Established: 2019
- Location: San Antonio, Texas, United States
- Coordinates: 29.4132°N 98.5020°W
- Type: Non-profit contemporary art gallery
- Founder: Linda Pace
- Director: Elyse A. Gonzales
- Architect: David Adjaye
- Website: rubycity.org

Ruby City is a contemporary art center in San Antonio, Texas.

Founded by Linda Pace and housing her collection of contemporary art, the museum opened in 2019. The building was designed by David Adjaye. Entrance is free.

Ruby City's director is Elyse A. Gonzales.

== See also ==
- Artpace
- List of museums in Central Texas
