= Thomas Zigal =

American writer

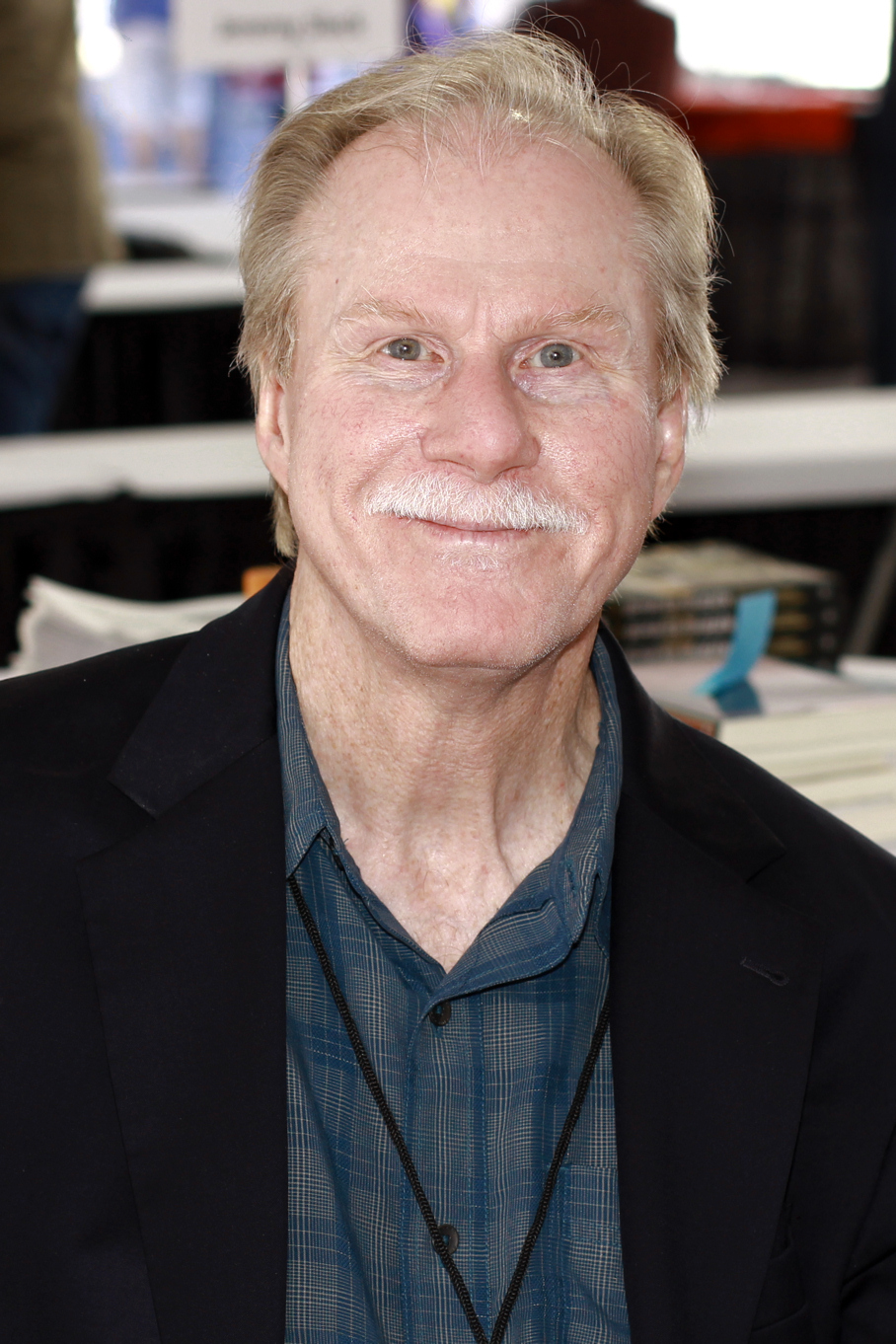
Zigal at the 2019 Texas Book Festival

Thomas Zigal is an American writer.

== Early life ==
Zigal was born in Galveston, Texas. He grew up in Texas City. He attended high school in Lafayette, Louisiana and lived in New Orleans for four years in the 1980s and 1990s. Zigal was a victim of Hurricane Carla, which destroyed the family home in Texas City when he was a child.

== Career ==
As of 2014, he lived in Austin, Texas.

== Recognition ==
In 2014 Zigal won the Jesse Jones Award given by the Texas Institute of Letters in the fiction category for his 2013 novel, Many Rivers to Cross. Judges cited his "keen ear for the language of Hurricane Katrina victims, most of whom were African-Americans."

Many Rivers to Cross is the story of two grandfathers trying to find their common grandchildren in the aftermath of Hurricane Katrina.

Zigal is the author of the Kurt Muller Mysteries, a series of crime novels set in Aspen, Colorado, and of a literary thriller, The White League. The White League is the first of his projected series of New Orleans novels. Many Rivers to Cross is the second novel in the series.

== Books ==
- Many Rivers to Cross (TCU Press, 2013)
