= Artpace =

Coordinates: 29.4299°N 98.4943°W

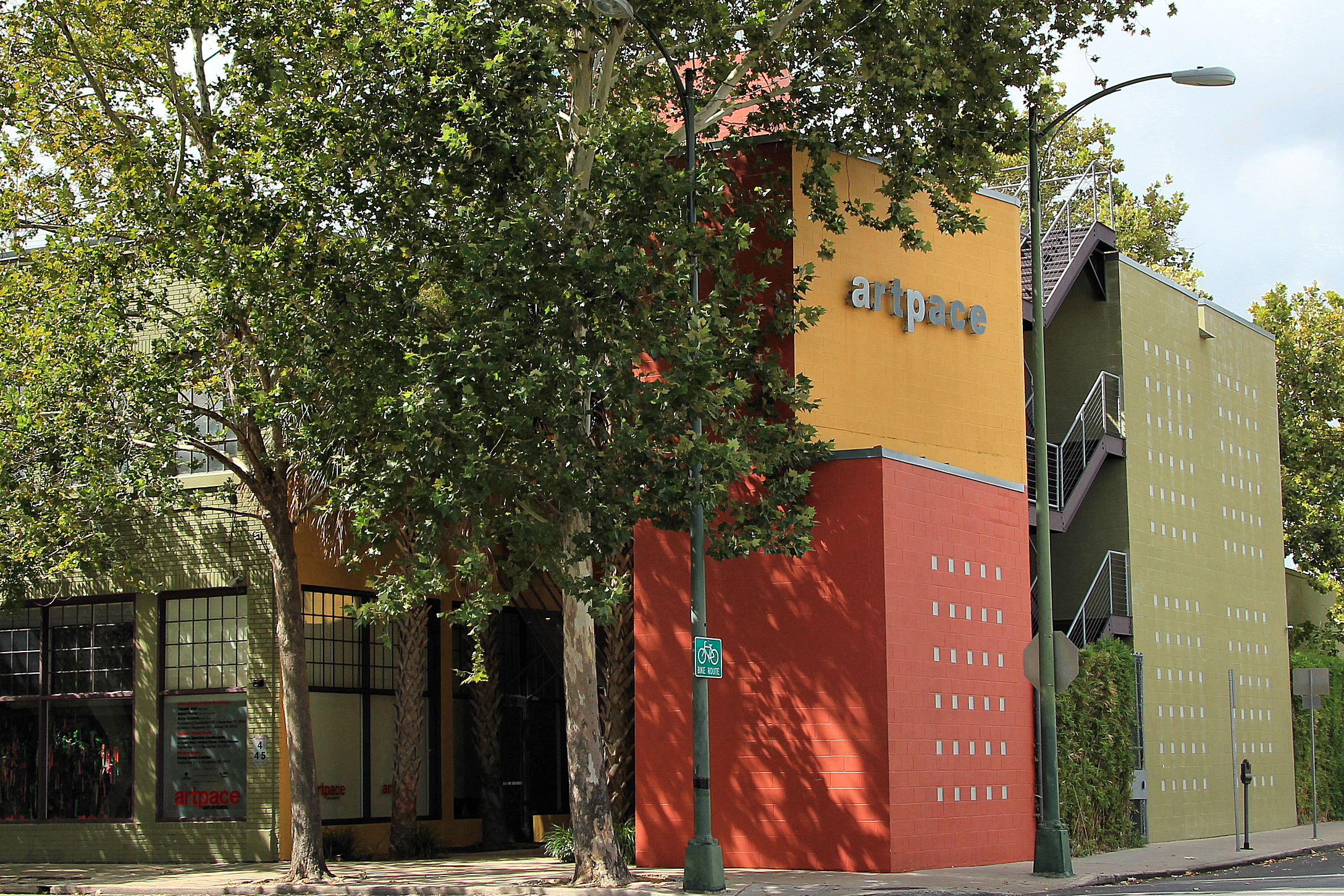
- Established: 1995
- Location: San Antonio, Texas, United States
- Type: Non-profit contemporary art gallery
- Founder: Linda Pace
- Director: Riley Robinson
- Website: artpace.org

Artpace (also known as Artpace San Antonio) is a non-profit contemporary art foundation located in downtown San Antonio, Texas that is free and open to the public. Founded by artist, collector, and philanthropist Linda Pace, Artpace opened its doors in 1995, and focuses on nurturing the creative and artistic processes of both established and emerging artists. Fostering opportunities for dialogue and social interactions between artists and community members of all ages has always been central to the various programs at Artpace.

Once a former 1920s Hudson automobile dealership, Artpace utilizes its 18,000 square feet of industrial space to exhibit contemporary art in five separate exhibition spaces including: the Hudson Showroom the Main Space gallery and three separate artist exhibition spaces. There are also three furnished apartments for visiting artists and curators to use, an in-house archives and research library, a workshop, and other areas for special events including social gatherings and lectures.

== International artist-in-residence program ==
Artpace is known for their International Artist-in-Residence (IAIR) program. The IAIR artists are chosen by a guest curator and the program invites nine artists per year to live and work at Artpace in three different four month cycles. Each guest curator selects one artist from Texas, one from the United States, and one from around the world to Artpace to create original works of art. Each artist is provided with furnished accommodations, 24/7 studio and exhibition site access, living expenses, a grant to purchase materials, and travel reimbursements. The IAIR program provides artists with the resources and support needed to create art without restrictions. Each residency begins with an informal potluck dinner introducing the artists to the people of the local community, and at the end of the residency, a curator/ artist dialogue is held in conjunction with the opening of the exhibitions to help viewers contextualize the work.

Since 1995, over 250 artists from around the world have participated in the IAIR Program, and more than 80 curators have selected the resident artists. Former IAIR participants have gone on to receive numerous prestigious art awards including four Turner Prizes, nine MacArthur Fellows, fifteen Guggenheim Fellows, and over 84 artists have made appearances at the Venice Biennale and Whitney Biennial.

== Educational programs ==
The education department at Artpace has K-12 programs, community programs (including Chalk It Up), U of Artpace (university programs), family day and adult programs. Chalk It Up promotes the importance of collaborative public art on the streets of downtown San Antonio. Each year, Houston Street in downtown San Antonio is transformed by the creation of original, non-permanent chalk murals by artists of all ages and abilities. The event facilitates informal learning interactions between the community and contemporary artists.

== See also ==
- Ruby City (San Antonio)

== International artists-in-residence ==
Year	IAIR .1	IAIR .2	IAIR .3	IAIR .4
1995	Jesse Amado, Félix González-Torres, Annette Messager	Joe Daun, Jun Nguyen-Hatsushiba, Tracey Moffatt	David Avalos, David Zamora Casas, Antony Gormley	Leonardo Drew, Cisco Jimenez, Ken Little
1996	Leni Hoffmann, Elizabeth McGrath, May Sun	Dorothy Cross, Alex De Leon, Lewis deSoto	Xu Bing, Esko Männikkö, Franco Mondini-Ruiz	Alejandro Diaz, Paula Santiago, Joyce J. Scott
1997	Anya Gallaccio, Nancy Rubins, Kathy Vargas	Michael O’Malley, Cornelia Parker	Alex Bag, César Martínez, Jaan Toomik	Nate Cassie, Iñigo Manglano-Ovalle, Hale Tenger
1998	Tadashi Kawamata, Glenn Ligon, Constance Lowe	Joan Bankemper, Henrik Plenge Jakobsen, Holly Moe	Kendell Geers, Bill Lundberg, Diana Thater	Teresita Fernández, Araya Rasdjarmrearnsook, Angel Rodriguez-Diaz
1999	George Cisneros, Simryn Gill, Carolee Schneemann	Laura Aguilar, Mona Hatoum, Regina Vater	Oladélé Ajiboyé Bamgboyé, Liisa Roberts, Chris Sauter	Isaac Julien, Christian Marclay, Mei Zeigler
2000	Arturo Herrera, Rebecca Holland, Tracey Rose	Maurizio Cattelan, Joachim Koester, Margo Sawyer	Yiso Bahc, Yangah Ham, Dario Robleto	John Hernandez, Jason Rhoades, Yutaka Sone
2001	Rivane Neuenschwander, Shahzia Sikander, Tony Villejo	Brian Conley, Christian Jankowski, Lordy Rodriguez	Jim Mendiola, Ordo Amoris Cabinet, Rubén Ortiz-Torres	Candice Breitz, Surasi Kusolwong, Chuck Ramirez
2002	Ann-Sofi Sidén, Arthur Jafa, Sharon Engelstein	Giuseppe Gabellone, Aïda Ruilova, Juan Miguel Ramos	Brian Fridge, Paul Pfeiffer, Susan Philipsz	Koo Jeong-a, Erick Swenson
2003	Jeremy Deller, Kim Jones, Robyn O’Neil	—	—	Spencer Finch, Koo Jeong-a, Erick Swenson
2004	Michel François, Oliver Herring, Michael Velliquette	Fareed Armaly, Ulrike Ottinger, Willie Varela	Wangechi Mutu, Millic Tomic, Anne Wallace	—
2005	Daniel Joseph Martinez, Cruz Ortiz, Bojan Šarčević	Jorge Macchi, Hills Snyder, Anton Vidokle	Harrell Fletcher, Katrina Moorhead, Melik Ohanian	—
2006	Luz Maria Sanchez, Gerda Steiner & Jörg Lenzlinger, Do-Ho Suh	Chiho Aoshima, Katie Pell, Allison Smith	Edgar Arceneaux, Augusto Di Stefano, Ranjani Shettar	—
2007	Glenn Kaino, Robert Pruitt, Katja Strunz	Stefano Arienti, Lorraine O’Grady, Eduardo Muñoz Ordoqui	Matthew Buckingham, Chris Evans, Alex Rubio	—
2008	Margarita Cabrera, Regina José Galindo, Rodney McMillian	Mark Bradford, William Cordova, Marcos Ramírez	Richie Budd, Lu Chensheng	—
2009	Sterling Allen, Richard Grayson, C.T. Jasper	Anne Collier, Silke Otto-Knapp	Adrian Esparza, Adriana Lara, Mario Ybarra Jr.	—
2010	Jamal Cyrus, Corey McCorkle, Monika Sosnowska	Adam Schreiber, Roy McMakin, Henning Bohl	—	—
2011	Frank Benson, Graham Fagen, Jeff Williams	—	E.V. Day, Devon Dikeou, Kelly Richardson	Andrea Büttner, Kurt Mueller, Adrian Williams
2012	Adam Pendleton, James Sham, Florian Slotawa	Leslie Hewitt, Jacco Olivier	—	David Benjamin Sherry, Dor Guez, Sarah Sudhoff
2013	Tala Madani, Adam Putnam, J. Parker Valentine	Clarissa Tossin, Adam Putnam, J. Parker Valentine	Micol Assael, Erin Shirreff, Ivor Shearer	—
2014	Rosa Barba, Liz Glynn, Jessica Mallios	—	—	—
