= Loree Rackstraw =

American literary critic and memoirist

Loree Rackstraw (June 27, 1931 – May 8, 2018) was an American literary critic and memoirist. She taught English at the University of Northern Iowa from 1966 to 1996, and she was the author of Love As Always, Kurt: Vonnegut As I Knew Him (2009).

== Biography ==
Loree Rackstraw was born Lora Lee Pugh on June 27, 1931, in Omaha, Nebraska. She received an undergraduate degree in philosophy from Grinnell College in 1953, and an MFA in English at the University of Iowa. While at the University of Iowa as a student in the Iowa Writers' Workshop, one of her instructors in 1965-1966 was Kurt Vonnegut, with whom she began a friendship that lasted more than forty years and which is documented in Love As Always, Kurt: Vonnegut As I Knew Him.

In 1966, Rackstraw began a thirty-year career in the Department of English Language and Literature at the University of Northern Iowa, where she taught courses in fiction writing, literature, mythology and humanities. She also served as a fiction editor and reviewer for the North American Review and was a long-time member of the College Hill Neighborhood Association in Cedar Falls, Iowa.

In 2009, Rackstraw published Love As Always, Kurt: Vonnegut As I Knew Him, a literary memoir detailing her long-term friendship with Kurt Vonnegut, as well as her responses, as a literary critic, to his work. After their time together in Iowa City, Vonnegut and Rackstraw remained frequent correspondents and often visited one another. Rackstraw also regularly reviewed Vonnegut's work in her official capacity at the North American Review and published a number of academic articles on his work in books and journals including Kurt Vonnegut: Images and Representations (2000) and The Vonnegut Chronicles: Interviews and Essays (1996).

Jerome Klinkowitz finds that this relationship had a significant impact on the work of both Rackstraw and Vonnegut:

“It had to have been the impression Kurt’s work made that prompted Loree’s investigations of feminist thought. And because she was thinking this way and was in frequent contact with Kurt by mail and phone similar trends in his own fiction developed. Would he have written Galápagos without her? I’m sure there’d be no Circe Berman in Bluebeard without Loree, and perhaps no Bluebeard at all.”

Rackstraw appears in chapter 62 of Kurt Vonnegut's semi-autobiographical novel, Timequake, at a clambake held in honor of Vonnegut's recurring character, Kilgore Trout.

Loree Rackstraw's papers have been held since 1996 in the University of Northern Iowa Special Collections and University Archives.

== Selected publications ==
- Love As Always, Kurt: Vonnegut As I Knew Him. Cambridge, MA: Da Capo Press, 2009. Print.
- “The Paradox of 'Awareness' and Language in Vonnegut's Fiction.” Kurt Vonnegut: Images and Representations. Eds. Marc Leeds and Peter J. Reed. Praeger, 2000. 51–66. Print.
- “Dancing with the Muse in Vonnegut's Later Novels.” The Vonnegut Chronicles: Interviews and Essays. Eds. Peter J. Reed and Marc Leeds. Greenwood Press, 1996. 123–43. Print.
