= Tralfamadore =

Fictional planet variants in Kurt Vonnegut works

Tralfamadore is the name of a fictional planet appearing in the novels of Kurt Vonnegut, most significantly in The Sirens of Titan and Slaughterhouse-Five, in inconsistently described variations. It is variously depicted as being located outside of the Milky Way galaxy or being fictional within the fiction itself.

== Appearances ==
- In the 1959 novel The Sirens of Titan, Tralfamadore is a planet in the Small Magellanic Cloud and the home of a civilization of machines, who had long ago superseded their organic builders when those let themselves be exterminated for having no discernible higher purpose. A central plot revolves around a Tralfamadorian messenger "stranded on Titan" who takes "control of human history in order to transmit a message home requesting a spare part for his spaceship."
- In the 1965 novel God Bless You, Mr. Rosewater, Tralfamadore is referenced as a fictional location made up by Kilgore Trout, a recurring character in Vonnegut's works.
- In the 1969 novel Slaughterhouse-Five, Tralfamadore is the home to organic beings who can see into all times, and are thus privy to knowledge of future events. Lawrence R. Broer described both them and their counterparts from Sirens as "ludicrous-looking". Science-fiction scholar Brian Stableford suggested that Tralfamadore here exists in a different fictional universe than the planet referred to in Sirens of Titan, but where the original organic inhabitants have not died out. Protagonist Billy Pilgrim, dealing with the trauma from experiencing the bombing of Dresden, relates how he is kidnapped by Tralfamadorians, leaving ambiguous if the planet exists in the novel or just in the character's imagination. In a similar role to God Bless You, Mr. Rosewater, Tralfamadore for Pilgrim is a place "where the problematic aspects of his earthly existence are all nicely resolved." Lawrence R. Broer observed that "Tralfamadore" is an anagram for "Or Fatal Dream", which is fitting as its inhabitants follow fatalistic ideas that guide Billy Pilgrim down into "his schizophrenic descent into madness". However, in the afterword of Slaughterhouse Five, Vonnegut, in the meta-narrative, independent of Billy's narrative, explicitly states that Billy Pilgrim actually is time traveling and discusses his meeting with, and what he learned from the Tralfamadorians as if it is fact, not hallucination. Throughout the novel he also clearly delineates between hallucination, memory, and genuine time travel, as well as tells the reader things Billy couldn't know that also confirm the time travel and Tralfamadorians are real within the story, not merely in Billy's mind..
- In the 1990 book Hocus Pocus, Tralfamadore appears again in a fiction within the fiction, published in a pornographic magazine. As in The Sirens of Titan, the Tralfamadorians disrupt the history of humankind, here in favor of bacteria which they view as more valuable. Salman Rushdie remarked that this has the effect that "it makes a person feel pretty darn small".
- In the 1997 novel Timequake, Tralfamadore is mentioned as a fantastical meeting place of anthropomorphized chemical elements, who, like the Tralfamadorians from other works, were "higher level beings" and happier than humans, considering them a "peerlessly cruel and oafish species".

== Analysis ==
Tralfamadore's inhabitants are described inconsistently across different works. Robert Tally compared this to Vonnegut's habit of (re-)introducing characters that have the same names as characters in previous works, but where the details do not match. Tally concluded that Vonnegut—unlike e.g. J. R. R. Tolkien—was not interested in creating an internally consistent fictional universe across his oeuvre, but content with a broad-strokes approach.

A recurring characteristic of the inhabitants of Tralfamadore is their low esteem of humanity. Brian Stableford, considering the examples of Sirens of Titan and Slaughterhouse-Five, described the different Tralfamadorian races themselves as "tiny-minded smartasses" rendered impotent by their fatalistic worldview. Vonnegut scholar Julia A. Whitehead saw the overall concept of Tralfamadore throughout the author's work as in "many ways [...] his own Eden", an escapist imagined home of happier beings. In her view the presentation of the Tralfamadorians with their deeper insights into "the science of nature [...] was Vonnegut's way of telling readers that humans don't know enough about each other and other life forms."
