= Rackstraw =

Rackstraw is a surname. Notable people with the surname include:

- Charlie Rackstraw (born 1938), English footballer
- Loree Rackstraw (1931–2018), American literary critic
- Rob Rackstraw (born 1965), British voice actor
- Robert Rackstraw, suspect in the D. B. Cooper skyjacking case

== Fictional ==
- The Rackstraw family, characters in the 1922 silent film A Soul's Awakening
- Ralf Rackstraw, a character in the comic opera H.M.S. Pinafore
