= Fates Worse Than Death =

1991 collection of writings by author Kurt Vonnegut Jr.

- First edition
- Author: Kurt Vonnegut
- Language: English
- Publisher: G. P. Putnam's Sons
- Publication date: 1991 (1st edition), September 1, 1992 (Reprint)
- Publication place: United States
- Media type: Print (Hardcover, Paperback)
- Pages: 240
- ISBN: 0-399-13633-9
- OCLC: 26523103
- Preceded by: Hocus Pocus

Fates Worse than Death, subtitled An Autobiographical Collage of the 1980s, is a 1991 collection of essays, speeches, and other previously uncollected writings by author Kurt Vonnegut Jr. In the introduction to the book, Vonnegut acknowledges that the book is similar to an earlier book, Palm Sunday. In it he discusses his attempted suicide.

Due to the autobiographical nature of the book, Vonnegut provides some details about his upbringing and life, such as his childhood in Indiana. His education at Cornell University, Carnegie Tech, University of Tennessee, and University of Chicago are briefly mentioned as well.

Vonnegut also describes life experiences that are found in his novels. For example, Slaughterhouse-Five deals with a firebombing of Dresden, Germany, an event that he was present at during his time in the Army. Specifically, "I was a battalion scout, a PFC, who was captured on the border of Germany in December 1944 during the Battle of the Bulge. Thus did I happen to be a laborer under guard in Dresden when it was firebombed on February 13, 1945." As this experience was similar to that of Jewish prisoners in World War II, Vonnegut's use of "liberated" to describe his release is somewhat unsurprising. In fact, he "spent some time with concentration camp survivors and heard their stories before returning to the American lines." Despite similarities between Vonnegut's experiences and those of the main character of the book, Billy Pilgrim, Vonnegut stated, "The firebombing at Dresden explains absolutely nothing about why I write what I write and am what I am." He does give some insight to his motivation for writing though, saying, "the villains in my books ... are never individuals. The villains again: culture, society, and history."

This book also includes a "humanist requiem" that Vonnegut wrote as a reaction to the Roman Catholic Requiem, which he had heard in Andrew Lloyd Webber's setting and whose text he found "terrible and sadistic". Vonnegut's own text was then set as a "Cosmos Cantata" by the composer Seymour Barab, of whom Vonnegut said, "Barab's music is full of magic. He proved to an atheist that God exists. What an honor to have worked with him."

The ending of this text is as follows:

"Let not eternal light disturb our sleep, O Cosmos, for Thou art merciful. Deliver me, O Cosmos, from everlasting wakefulness. On that dread day when the heavens and earth shall quake, when we shall dissolve the world into glowing ashes in the name of gods unknowable, I am seized with trembling and I am afraid until that day of reckoning shall arrive. Hence I pray, Deliver me, O Cosmos, from everlasting wakefulness on that day of wrath, calamity and misery. Rest grant us, O Cosmos, and let not light perpetual disturb our sleep."

== Resources ==
Kurt Vonnegut, Jr.'s original sermon "Fates Worse Than Death" delivered at the Cathedral of St. John the Divine, May 23, 1982.
