= Kurt Vonnegut: Letters =

Book

- Editor: Dan Wakefield
- Author: Kurt Vonnegut
- Language: English
- Genre: Non-fiction, Letters
- Publisher: Delacorte Press
- Publication date: October 30, 2012
- Publication place: United States
- Media type: Print (Hardcover, Paperback), E-book, Audiobook
- Pages: 464
- OCLC: 796759767
- Dewey Decimal: 818/.5409
- LC Class: PS3572.O5 A6 2012

Kurt Vonnegut: Letters is a collection of letters written by American author Kurt Vonnegut, edited by his friend and fellow writer Dan Wakefield. Published by Delacorte Press on October 30, 2012, the book compiles a wide range of Vonnegut's correspondence spanning his entire life, offering insight into his personal thoughts, relationships, and the development of his literary career.

== Background ==
Kurt Vonnegut (1922–2007) was a renowned American author known for his satirical and darkly humorous novels, including Slaughterhouse-Five, Cat's Cradle, and Breakfast of Champions. Over his lifetime, he wrote numerous letters to friends, family, editors, and fellow writers. This collection was meticulously compiled and edited by Dan Wakefield, who was a close friend of Vonnegut. Wakefield provides context and annotations throughout the book, enriching the reader's understanding of the letters' significance.

== Content ==
The letters in the collection cover a wide range of topics, including Vonnegut's experiences during World War II, his views on politics and society, his struggles and triumphs as a writer, and his personal relationships. The book is divided into sections that correspond to different periods in Vonnegut's life, offering a chronological perspective on his development as an individual and an author.

== Reception ==
Kurt Vonnegut: Letters received positive reviews from critics and readers alike. Reviewers praised the book for its candid and intimate portrayal of Vonnegut, as well as the insightful annotations by Wakefield. The collection has been lauded as a valuable resource for fans of Vonnegut's work and scholars studying his contributions to American literature.

== Notable letters ==
Some of the notable letters included in the collection are:

- A letter to his family describing his experiences as a prisoner of war in Germany during World War II.
- Correspondence with his editor discussing the challenges and successes of publishing his novels.
- Letters to fellow writers such as Norman Mailer and Joseph Heller.

== See also ==
- Kurt Vonnegut bibliography
