= Hocus Pocus (novel) =

1990 novel by Kurt Vonnegut

- First edition hardcover
- Author: Kurt Vonnegut
- Language: English
- Genre: Novel
- Publisher: Putnam Publishing Group
- Publication date: 1990
- Publication place: United States
- Media type: Print (hardcover & paperback)
- Pages: 302
- ISBN: 0-399-13799-8

Hocus Pocus, or What's the Hurry, Son? is a 1990 novel by Kurt Vonnegut.

== Plot summary ==
In an editor's note at the beginning of the book, Vonnegut claims to have found hundreds of scraps of paper of varying sizes, from wrapping paper to business cards, sequentially numbered by their author to form a narrative. The breaks between pieces of paper often signal a sort of ironic "punchline".

The main character is Eugene Debs Hartke, a Vietnam War veteran and carillonneur who realizes that he has killed exactly as many people as the number of women he has had sex with. The character's name is a homage to American labor and political leader Eugene V. Debs and anti-war senator Vance Hartke, both from Vonnegut's home state, Indiana. Upon his discharge from the military, Hartke becomes a professor at Tarkington College in the Finger Lakes region of upstate New York, but is later fired for indoctrinating students in anti-american thoughts after being secretly by a student who is the daughter of a right wing reactionary and publicity hound.

Hartke then becomes a teacher at a private prison in the nearby town of Athena, New York. The prison is run by a Japanese corporation and overseen by Hartke's occasional acquaintance, Hiroshi Matsumoto. The prison is populated entirely by black inmates, America prison system having having been resegregated by both race to reduce conflict and violence. Hartke sets about teaching the inmates how to read.

After a massive prison break, the escaped inmates occupy Tarkington College and take the staff hostage. With the old prison destroyed in the breakout, Tarkington becomes a prison with Hartke as its warden. When it becomes known that the breakout was led by one of his former students, Hartke is accused of collaboration and ends up as an inmate himself.

Upon completion of the riddle on the final page, Eugene's number of sexual partners and confirmed kills is found to be 82.

== Film adaptation ==
In March 2021, Uri Singer acquired the rights to adapt the novel into a film.

== Analysis ==
The motif of the inhabitants of Tralfamadore influencing human history, here in a work of fiction within the story, recurs from Vonnegut's previous work The Sirens of Titan (1959). The title of the fictional story is "The Protocols of the Elders of Tralfamadore", a reference to The Protocols of the Elders of Zion. Robert M. Philmus concludes that the author of the fictional story, not named in the text, is intended to be recurring Vonnegut character Kilgore Trout. Kirkus Reviews called the presence of a brief reference to Tralfamadore "standard Vonnegut".
