= Ginger Strand =

American novelist

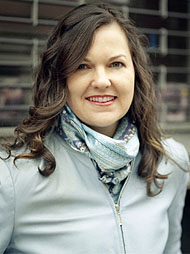
- Ginger Strand Author Portrait in Flight
- Occupations: Novelist, writing instructor
- Writing career
- Period: 2005–present
- Genres: Fiction, Nonfiction
- Website: www.gingerstrand.com

Ginger Strand is an American author of nonfiction and fiction. Her 2005 debut novel Flight was adapted from several of her short stories. Her published books of non-fiction include Inventing Niagara: Beauty, Power, and Lies in May 2008, Killer on the Road: Violence and the American Interstate in 2012, and The Brothers Vonnegut: Science and Fiction in the House of Magic in 2015. She has published articles in The New Yorker, The New York Times, Pacific Standard, Tin House, and The Believer, among others. She was a 2009 New York Foundation for the Arts fellow in nonfiction.

== Biography ==
Ginger Strand grew up mostly on a farm in Michigan. Her family moved often while her father served in the Air National Guard. Throughout her childhood, she lived in Texas, Missouri, Illinois, Wisconsin, and Michigan. Her father later worked as a commercial airline pilot for TWA for 35 years. Strand is a 1992 graduate from Princeton University. She has a daughter and lives in New York City. She has taught writing at Fordham University, Portland State University and the Bread Loaf Environmental Writers Conference.

Her essays and fiction have appeared in The New Yorker, The Believer, Harper's, The Iowa Review, The Gettysburg Review, Tin House and Orion. Strand has received residency grants from the MacDowell Colony, Yaddo, the Virginia Center for the Creative Arts, and the American Antiquarian Society, as well as a fellowship in nonfiction from the Bread Loaf Writers' Conference and a Tennessee Williams scholarship in fiction from the Sewanee Writers' Conference. She is a contributing editor at Orion. Strand is also a former fellow in the Behrman Center for the Humanities at Princeton University.

Strand is often considered an environmental writer, a label she has said she never sought. She has been critical of Google’s environmental policies. Her 2008 article "The Crying Indian" in Orion, which won a Pushcart Prize, drew links between Native American displacement, government-funded aluminum production, and Keep America Beautiful, which she labels an astroturfing organization. In a November 2006 New York Times story, she talks about her personal difficulty in being eco-conscious.

She lists her obsessions as water, ancient Rome, infrastructure, SuperFund, airplanes, silent film, panopticons, P. T. Barnum, photography, lies, the 1930s, Niagara Falls, the U.S. Environmental Protection Agency, Edward Wormley, consumerism and rhinoceroses, especially one named Clara who lived in the 18th century.

Strand is represented by The Wylie Agency.

== Books ==
Strand's debut novel, Flight, was published by Simon & Schuster in May 2005. Strand describes Flight as “the echoes and overlaps of four voices.” The story takes places in the days leading up to a wedding in rural Michigan as the Gruens, a Midwestern family, struggle with their individual private dramas.

Strand's second book was nonfiction, Inventing Niagara: Beauty, Power, Lies, and published by Simon & Schuster in early 2008. The book combines history, reportage, and personal narrative to build a cultural history of natural wonder at Niagara Falls. Strand writes about how Niagara Falls has been depicted and used throughout America's history, and how its natural environment has been altered.

In researching her second book, Strand used handbills, guidebooks, travelogues, treaties, and images in the American Antiquarian Society's collections. The book chronicles Strands' fascination with infrastructure, which she calls "a culture's dream made visible.”

Inventing Niagara received positive reviews in the New York Times Book Review, Newsweek, the Washington Post, and the Wall Street Journal. The book was a finalist for the 2008 Orion Magazine Book Award and was picked as one of summer 2008's best non-fiction books by Fresh Air on NPR.

Strand's third book,Killer on the Road: Violence and the American Interstate was published by the University of Texas in 2012. The book looks at the links between serial murder and our Interstate Highway System, and was described in the New York Times as "part true-crime entertainment, part academic exegesis, part political folk ballad." Profiling highway killers such as Charles Starkweather, Edmund Kemper, Wayne Williams, Roger Kibbe, and Bruce Mendenhall, Strand describes how they utilized the interstates and how the highways themselves serve as what she calls "analogs of cultural psychosis."

Her fourth book The Brothers Vonnegut: Science and Fiction in the House of Magic was published by Farrar, Straus and Giroux in 2015. It traces the lives of brothers Kurt Vonnegut and Bernard Vonnegut during the time when both were working at General Electric in the 1940s, Kurt as a public relations man, and Bernard as a scientist in the General Electric Research Laboratory. It depicts how Bernard's involvement in early experiments in weather modification influenced the early writings of his brother Kurt. Strand discussed the book on Science Friday and it was subsequently the center of an episode of the podcast Undiscovered.

In writing The Brothers Vonnegut, Strand received access to a cache of private letters between Kurt Vonnegut and his wife Jane Vonnegut which demonstrated how central Jane was in encouraging Kurt to become a writer. She wrote about their relationship for The New Yorker.
