= God Bless You, Dr. Kevorkian =

Collection of short fictional interviews written by Kurt Vonnegut

- First edition
- Author: Kurt Vonnegut
- Language: English
- Genre: Speculative fiction
- Publisher: Seven Stories Press
- Publication date: 1999
- Publication place: United States
- Media type: Print

God Bless You, Dr. Kevorkian, by Kurt Vonnegut, is a collection of short fictional interviews written by Vonnegut and first broadcast on WNYC. The title parodies that of Vonnegut's 1965 novel God Bless You, Mr. Rosewater. It was published in book form in 1999.

== Synopsis ==
The premise of the collection is that Vonnegut employs Dr. Jack Kevorkian to give him near-death experiences, allowing Vonnegut access to heaven and those in it for a limited time. While in the afterlife Vonnegut interviews a range of people including Adolf Hitler, William Shakespeare, Eugene V. Debs, Isaac Asimov, Isaac Newton and the ever-present Kilgore Trout (a fictional character created by Vonnegut in his earlier works).

== Resources ==
- The book's page in the website of Seven Stories Press
- Many of the original WNYC radio reports forming the basis of the book
