= We Are What We Pretend to Be: The First and Last Works =

Collection containing previously unpublished works by Kurt Vonnegut

We Are What We Pretend To Be: The First and Last Works
- First edition
- Author: Kurt Vonnegut
- Language: English
- Publisher: Vanguard Press
- Publication date: 2013
- Publication place: United States
- Pages: 176
- ISBN: 9781593157432

We Are What We Pretend To Be: The First and Last Works is a book by Kurt Vonnegut. Published posthumously in 2013, it contains two novellas that were previously unpublished: Basic Training and If God Were Alive Today. It also contains some reminiscences and commentary by his daughter Nanette. The book's title comes from the preface of the 1966 edition of his novel Mother Night: "We are what we pretend to be, so we must be careful about what we pretend to be."

Basic Training is his first novella (apparently written during the late 1940s), originally intended to be sold under the pseudonym "Mark Harvey."

If God Were Alive Today is his last novel, which was incomplete at the time of his death in 2007.
