= Vonnegut by the Dozen =

Kurt Vonnegut essay collection

- Editor: Richard Lingeman
- Author: Kurt Vonnegut
- Language: English
- Genre: Essays
- Publisher: The Nation Co., LP
- Publication date: August 5, 2013
- Publication place: United States
- Media type: eBook
- Pages: 220

Vonnegut by the Dozen: Twelve Pieces by Kurt Vonnegut is a collection of twelve essays written by the American author Kurt Vonnegut. The essays were originally published in The Nation magazine between 1978 and 1998 and compiled into an eBook published by The Nation in 2013. The collection was edited by Richard Lingeman.

== Background ==
Kurt Vonnegut (1922–2007) was a renowned American writer known for his satirical and darkly humorous novels that often explored themes of war, technology, and the human condition. His most famous works include Slaughterhouse-Five (1969), Cat's Cradle (1963), and Breakfast of Champions (1973). Vonnegut's writing was heavily influenced by his experiences as a soldier in World War II, particularly his survival of the Dresden bombings, which became a central theme in much of his work.

== Content ==
Vonnegut by the Dozen collects twelve essays that reflect Vonnegut's distinctive voice, characterized by its blend of satirical humor and serious social commentary. The essays cover a range of topics, including war, politics, and the absurdities of modern life. Each piece in the collection was originally published in The Nation, where Vonnegut was a regular contributor.

== Themes ==
The essays in Vonnegut by the Dozen are unified by Vonnegut's deep skepticism of authority and his critique of American militarism. Drawing from his experiences in World War II, Vonnegut's writings in this collection often condemn the U.S.'s post-war military interventions, which he saw as unjust and hypocritical. His signature style—a "faux-simpleminded" approach—allows him to address these heavy topics with a blend of humor and profundity, making his critiques both accessible and impactful.

== Reception ==
Vonnegut by the Dozen has been praised for capturing the essence of Vonnegut's later work. The collection is considered a valuable addition to the Vonnegut canon, offering readers insight into the author's evolving thoughts during the last decades of his life.
