= William Rodney Allen =

American author and Professor of English

William Rodney Allen is an American author and former Professor of English at the Louisiana School for Math, Science, and the Arts. He received his PhD from Duke University, and was a faculty member at LSMSA from the time the school first opened in 1983 until his retirement in 2011. He wrote the 1986 book Walker Percy: A Southern Wayfarer. He is married to Cindy Allen, a counselor at the school, and has two daughters, Emily and Claire, with her. He has many interests, which include and are not limited to playing guitar, reading, and cutting down Magnolia trees. He is also a Kurt Vonnegut fan and owns what is believed to be the last thing that Vonnegut wrote before his death in 2007, a postcard addressed to Allen.

== Works ==
- Walker Percy: A Southern Wayfarer, University Press of Mississippi, 2006, ISBN 978-1-934110-00-3
- Conversations with Kurt Vonnegut (Literary conversations series) University Press of Mississippi, 1988, ISBN 978-0-87805-358-2
- Understanding Kurt Vonnegut (Understanding Contemporary American Literature) (1991)
- The Heath Introduction to Literature (1999)
- The Coen Brothers: Interviews Conversations with Filmmakers Series University Press of Mississippi, 2006, ISBN 978-1-57806-889-0
