= Kilgore Trout =

Character created by Kurt Vonnegut

- First appearance: 1965
- Last appearance: 2004
- Created by: Kurt Vonnegut
- Portrayed by: Albert Finney

In-universe information
- Gender: Male
- Occupation: Science fiction writer
- Children: Leon Trotsky Trout
- Nationality: American

Kilgore Trout is a fictional character created by author Kurt Vonnegut (1922–2007). Trout is a notably unsuccessful author of paperback science fiction novels.

"Trout" was inspired by the name of science fiction author Theodore Sturgeon (1918–1985). Vonnegut was amused by the notion of a person with the name of a fish, and hence substituted "Trout" for "Sturgeon". Trout's appearances in a number of Vonnegut's works have led critics to also view the character as the author's own alter ego.

In an homage to Vonnegut, Kilgore Trout is also the ostensible author of the novel Venus on the Half-Shell (1975), written pseudonymously by Philip José Farmer who also wrote a short story about Kilgore Trout in The Book of Philip José Farmer.

== Origins of the character ==
The impetus to create Kilgore Trout as a character, Vonnegut suggested in a 1979 NYPR interview, was the convenience it offered to turn science-fiction plots into humorous parables. "Kilgore Trout was more or less invented by a friend of mine, Knox Burger, who was my editor in the early days. He did not suggest that I do this, but he said, 'You know, the problem with science-fiction? It's much more fun to hear someone tell the story of the book than to read the story itself.' And it's true: If you paraphrase a science-fiction story, it comes out as a very elegant joke, and it's over in a minute or so. It's a tedious business to read all the surrounding material. So I started summarizing [them], and I suppose I've now summarized 50 novels I will never have to write, and spared people the reading of them."

In 1957, Theodore Sturgeon moved to Truro, Massachusetts, where he befriended Vonnegut, then working as a salesman in a Saab dealership. At the time, both were writing in the genre of science fiction; Vonnegut had already published Player Piano, retitled Utopia 14 in paperback, while Sturgeon's then more-successful career (mainly as a short-story writer) stretched back to 1938. In fact, at the time of their initial meeting, Sturgeon was the most anthologized English-language science fiction author alive.

Sturgeon would continue writing, but his pace dipped noticeably after the end of the 1950s, and he published no original novels after 1961. By the time of Kilgore Trout's first appearance (in 1965's God Bless You, Mr. Rosewater), both Vonnegut and Sturgeon had moved to different cities, and Vonnegut had begun to be perceived as a mainstream author.

The "Kilgore Trout" name was a transparent reference to the older writer (substituting "Kilgore" for "Theodore" and "Trout" for "Sturgeon"), but since the characterization was less than flattering (both Sturgeon and Trout were financially unsuccessful and seemingly slipping into obscurity), Vonnegut did not publicly state the connection, nor did Sturgeon encourage the comparison. It was not until after Sturgeon's death in 1985 that Vonnegut explicitly acknowledged the matter, stating in a 1987 interview that "Yeah, it said so in his obituary in The New York Times. I was delighted that it said in the middle of it that he was the inspiration for the Kurt Vonnegut character of Kilgore Trout."

While Sturgeon did not resemble Trout in many respects, there were some points of similarity. According to The Los Angeles Times:

Like poor Kilgore Trout, Sturgeon often saw his best work emblazoned with awful titles conjured up by hasty editors — titles such as "The Incubi of Parallel X" (which Sturgeon called "the most horrible title to appear over my byline") or "The Cosmic Rape" or even the mega-awful "The Synthetic Man", that cruel paperback retitling of Sturgeon's greatest and most intricate novel, "The Dreaming Jewels". At first glance, a typical Sturgeon collection might look from afar as awful as something by Kilgore Trout. But once you read the first page, you knew you were in the hands of someone who never wrote a bad sentence.

== Appearances in Vonnegut books ==
Trout appears in several of Vonnegut's books, but the character is deliberately inconsistent as Vonnegut habitually changes major details about his life and circumstances with each appearance. Trout is consistently presented as a prolific but unappreciated science-fiction writer; other details, including his general appearance, demeanor and his dates of birth and death, vary widely from novel to novel. (Perhaps the most extreme instance of this occurs in Jailbird, wherein "Kilgore Trout" is merely a pseudonym of Dr. Robert Fender, a novelist and prison inmate.) Vonnegut makes no attempt to reconcile these sometimes extreme differences, and his novels do not form an internally consistent world.

Trout performs a variety of roles in Vonnegut's works: he acts as a catalyst for the main characters in Breakfast of Champions, God Bless You, Mr. Rosewater, and Slaughterhouse-Five, while in others, such as Jailbird and Timequake, Trout is an active character who is vital to the story. Trout is also described differently in several books; in Breakfast of Champions, he has, by the end, become something of a father figure, while in other novels, he seems to be something like Vonnegut in the early part of his career. In Hocus Pocus, Trout is not mentioned by name, but the protagonist is deeply affected while reading a Trout-like science fiction story. In early novels, Kilgore Trout lives in Ilium, New York, a fictional town whose name is based on Troy, New York (Illium was the Roman name for ancient Troy and Vonnegut lived and worked in nearby Schenectady for some time). In later novels, Trout inhabits a basement apartment in Cohoes, an ailing mill community. While living in Cohoes, Trout works as an installer of "aluminum combination storm windows and screens." The ghost of Trout's son, Leon Trotsky Trout, is the narrator of the novel Galápagos.

Trout, who has supposedly written over 117 novels and over 2,000 short stories, is usually described as an unappreciated science fiction writer whose works are used only as filler material in pornographic magazines. However, he does have at least three fans: Eliot Rosewater and Billy Pilgrim—both Vonnegut characters—have a near-complete collection of Trout's work or have read most of his work; in Galápagos, Leon Trotsky Trout goes on leave in Thailand and meets an unnamed Swedish doctor who is a fan of Kilgore Trout. This doctor helps Leon desert the U.S. Marine Corps and defect to Sweden, where he receives political asylum as a conscientious objector to the Vietnam War.

Vonnegut revised Trout's biography on several occasions. In Breakfast of Champions, he is born in 1907 and dies in 1981. In Timequake, he lives from 1917 to 2001. Both death dates are set in the future as of the time the novels were written. More recently, in an article for In These Times Vonnegut "reports" that Kilgore Trout commits suicide by drinking Drāno. Trout "dies" at midnight on October 15, 2004, in Cohoes following his consultation with a psychic, who informs him that George W. Bush would once again win the U. S. Presidential election by a vote of 5-to-4 in the Supreme Court. The epitaph on his tombstone reads, "Life is no way to treat an animal."

In Breakfast of Champions, Kilgore Trout has part of his right ring finger bitten off by the book's other main character, Dwayne Hoover, when Kilgore attends an arts festival in the Midwest. Trout also has an encounter with his creator, Mr. Vonnegut, in the final chapter. Vonnegut tells him that he is setting him free, in much the same way that Leo Tolstoy freed his serfs, and that the rest of his life will be much happier: his work will be republished by reputable publishers, and his ideas will become very influential, leading to him winning the Nobel Prize for medicine. However, Vonnegut cannot grant Trout's request to "make me young."

In Jailbird (1979), Kilgore Trout is revealed to be the only lifer in the Federal Minimum Security Adult Correctional Facility near Finletter Air Force Base, Georgia. Jailbird, narrated by the fictional character Walter F. Starbuck, shows Kilgore Trout to be the only American convicted of treason during the Korean War. Kilgore Trout is the pseudonym of (the equally fictional) Dr. Robert Fender, whose doctorate is in veterinary science. While in prison, Fender also writes many science fiction novels under another pseudonym, Frank X. Barlow, and works as the chief clerk in the supply room of the prison.

Galápagos is narrated by Leon Trotsky Trout (1946–1986), the son and only child of Kilgore Trout. Leon ran away at the age of 16, ashamed of his father, and never had any contact with him thereafter, until his death, when Kilgore appeared at the door of the "blue tunnel" that leads to the Afterlife. Kilgore appears at the door to the tunnel, urging his son to enter and proceed to the Afterlife. Three times Leon refuses, on the grounds that he wants to see more of human life in the hope of understanding it. During Kilgore's fourth appearance at the entrance to the blue tunnel, he threatens his son: if Leon doesn't leave the Earth immediately, the blue tunnel won't appear again for one million years. Since Kilgore has never lied to Leon, Leon knows this will come true. He is momentarily distracted by events on Earth, and the tunnel disappears. Galápagos contains several flashback scenes that explain the breakup between Kilgore and his wife. Leon states that he became a US Marine because his father was one. Trout's appearance in Galápagos is somewhat problematic for Vonnegut's continuity because the novel explicitly states that Kilgore dies before 1986, when the events of the novel take place. Yet Timequake finds him alive more than ten years later. In Galápagos, Leon uses his omniscient status as a ghost to confirm that he never fathered a child, so that Kilgore never had any descendants.

In Timequake, Kilgore's creed is "You were sick, but now you are well again. And there's work to be done." The novel also features Trout's last and presumably only poem:

When the tupelo
Goes poop-a-lo
I'll come back to youp-a-lo

It is stated in Timequake that Trout's father killed his mother when Trout was 12. This influences Trout later in life, when he is shown to say the phrase "ting-a-ling" whenever greeted or asked any questions.

Trout accidentally becomes a great hero, rescuing many lives after the timequake, and finally receives a measure of acclaim: he spends his last days in a literary colony, honored for his heroism and some of his discarded works, which were preserved by a security guard.

In A Man Without a Country, Vonnegut receives a brief phone call on January 20, 2004, from Kilgore Trout in which they discuss George W. Bush's State of the Union Address and the imminent death of the Earth due to human carelessness.

In God Bless You, Dr. Kevorkian, Vonnegut's final interview is with Trout.

== In other works ==
At least one actual published work is attributed to Kilgore Trout: the novel Venus on the Half-Shell, written by Philip José Farmer but published under the name "Kilgore Trout". For some time it was assumed that Vonnegut must have written it. Richard E. Geis, publisher of the semi-pro zine Science Fiction Review wrote a review under the assumption that Vonnegut had written the novel. Vonnegut, unhappy with the content of the review, later contacted Geis via an obscenity filled phonecall to convey his displeasure at Geis' review and personal comments about him.

Trout was portrayed by Albert Finney in the 1999 film adaptation of Breakfast of Champions, directed by Alan Rudolph.
