= Jailbird (novel) =

1979 novel by Kurt Vonnegut

- Cover of first edition (hardcover)
- Author: Kurt Vonnegut
- Language: English
- Genre: Novel
- Publisher: Delacorte Press
- Publication date: 1979
- Publication place: United States
- Media type: Print (hardcover and paperback)
- Pages: 268
- ISBN: 0-385-28627-9
- OCLC: 233790605

Jailbird is a novel by American author Kurt Vonnegut, published in 1979 by Delacorte Press. The novel is often described as Vonnegut's "Watergate novel," as it explores themes related to the Watergate scandal, the American labor movement, and the political landscape of the United States during the mid-20th century.

== Plot summary ==
The novel is narrated by Walter F. Starbuck, a minor player in the Watergate Scandal, who has just been released from a minimum-security prison in Georgia. The story unfolds as a memoir, with Starbuck recounting his experiences immediately following his release from prison. The narrative delves into his past, his involvement in the scandal, and his reflections on the American labor movement, corporate America, and the socio-political events of the time.

Throughout Jailbird, Vonnegut uses the character of Starbuck to explore themes of guilt, redemption, and the complexities of American history. The novel is notable for its satirical tone and its critique of the American political and economic systems.

== Recurring characters ==
Jailbird features a cameo by Kilgore Trout, a recurring character in Vonnegut's works. In this novel, Trout is portrayed differently than in other books, as he is revealed to be a pseudonym for a character in prison, which deliberately contradicts the autobiographical details of Trout's life in other Vonnegut novels. This serves as an example of Vonnegut's use of the unreliable narrator device.

== Literary significance and reception ==
The New York Times Book Review referred to Jailbird as Vonnegut's "Sermon on the Mount." Kirkus Reviews described the novel as "[n]ot top-drawer Vonnegut...but...there's enough of the author's narrative zip to keep fans happy even while the novel fizzles into foolishness."

In a 2013 article, Jacobin magazine called Jailbird Vonnegut's "most extensive exploration of labor" and "Vonnegut's clearest articulation of sympathies with the labor movement." Vonnegut himself gave the novel a grade of "A" when he graded all of his published works in his collection Palm Sunday.
