= Galápagos (novel) =

1985 novel by Kurt Vonnegut

- Cover of first edition (hardcover)
- Author: Kurt Vonnegut
- Language: English
- Genre: Science fiction
- Publisher: Delacorte Press
- Publication date: 1985
- Publication place: United States
- Media type: Print (hardback & paperback)
- ISBN: 0-385-29420-4
- OCLC: 220388927

Galápagos is a 1985 satirical science fiction novel by the American author Kurt Vonnegut, his eleventh published novel. Set in the Galápagos Islands after a global financial disaster, the novel questions the merit of the human brain from an evolutionary perspective. The title is both a reference to the islands on which part of the story plays out, and a tribute to Charles Darwin, on whose theory Vonnegut relies to reach his own conclusions. It was published by Delacorte Press.

== Plot summary ==
Galápagos is the story of a small band of mismatched humans who are shipwrecked on the fictional island of Santa Rosalia in the Galápagos Islands after a global financial crisis cripples the world's economy. Shortly thereafter, a disease renders all humans on Earth infertile, with the exception of the people on Santa Rosalia, making them the last specimens of humankind. Over the next million years, their descendants, the only fertile humans left on the planet, eventually evolve into a furry species resembling sea lions: though possibly still able to walk upright (it is not explicitly mentioned, but it is stated that they occasionally catch land animals), they have a snout with teeth adapted for catching fish, a streamlined skull and flipper-like hands with rudimentary fingers (described as "nubbins").

The story's narrator is a spirit who has been watching over humans for the last million years. This particular ghost is the immortal spirit of Leon Trotsky Trout, son of Vonnegut's recurring character Kilgore Trout. Leon is a Vietnam War veteran who is affected by the massacres in Vietnam. He goes AWOL and settles in Sweden, where he works as a shipbuilder and dies during the construction of the ship, the Bahía de Darwin. This ship is used for the "Nature Cruise of the Century". Planned as a celebrity cruise, it was in limbo due to the economic downturn, and due to a chain of unconnected events, the ship ends up allowing humans to reach and survive in the Galápagos. A group of girls from a cannibal tribe living in the Amazon rainforest, called the Kanka-bono girls, also end up on the ship, eventually having children with sperm obtained from the ship's captain.

The deceased Kilgore Trout makes four appearances in the novel, urging his son to enter the "blue tunnel" that leads to the afterlife. When Leon refuses for the fourth time, Kilgore pledges that he, and the blue tunnel, will not return for one million years, which leaves Leon to observe the slow process of evolution that transforms the humans into aquatic mammals. The process begins when a Japanese woman on the island, the daughter of a Hiroshima survivor, gives birth to a fur-covered daughter.

Trout maintains that all the sorrows of humankind were caused by "the only true villain in my story: the oversized human brain". Natural selection eliminates this problem, since the humans best fitted to Santa Rosalia were those who could swim best, which required a streamlined head, which in turn required a smaller brain.

== Main characters ==
- Leon Trout, dead narrator and son of Kilgore Trout
- Hernando Cruz, first mate of the Bahía de Darwin
- Mary Hepburn, an American widow who teaches at Ilium High School
- the Kanka-bono girls, a group of young girls from a cannibal tribe living in the Amazon rainforest
- Roy Hepburn, Mary's husband who died in 1985 from a brain tumor
- Akiko Hiroguchi, the daughter of Hisako that will be born with fur covering her entire body
- Hisako Hiroguchi, a teacher of ikebana and Zenji's pregnant wife
- Zenji Hiroguchi, a Japanese computer genius who invented the voice translator Gokubi and its successor Mandarax
- Bobby King, publicity man and organizer of the "Nature Cruise of the Century"
- Andrew MacIntosh, an American financier and adventurer of great inherited wealth
- Selena MacIntosh, Andrew's blind daughter, eighteen years old
- Jesús Ortiz, a talented Inca waiter who looks up to wealthy and powerful people
- Adolf von Kleist, captain of the Bahía de Darwin, who does not really know how to steer the ship
- Siegfried von Kleist, brother of Adolf and carrier of Huntington's chorea, who temporarily takes care of the reception at hotel El Dorado
- James Wait, a 35-year-old American swindler
- Pvt. Geraldo Delgado, an Ecuadorian soldier
- Mandarax, a fictional voice translation device that is treated in some ways as a character

== Literary techniques ==
=== Form ===
The main story is told a-chronologically with a framing story told by a narrator from a point a million years in the future, interspersed with flashbacks and commentary about the outcomes of future events of the main storyline. As a gimmick, an asterisk is placed in front of a character's name if they will die before sunset.

=== Quotations ===
The novel contains a large number of quotations from other authors. They are related to the story itself and are functionally inserted through Mandarax, a fictional voice translator that is also able to provide quotations from literature and history. The following authors are quoted (in order of their appearance in the book): Anne Frank, Alfred Tennyson, Rudyard Kipling, John Masefield, William Cullen Bryant, Ambrose Bierce, Lord Byron, Noble Claggett, John Greenleaf Whittier, Benjamin Franklin, John Heywood, Cesare Bonesana Beccaria, Bertolt Brecht, Saint John, Charles Dickens, Isaac Watts, William Shakespeare, Plato, Robert Browning, Jean de La Fontaine, François Rabelais, Patrick R. Chalmers, Michel de Montaigne, Joseph Conrad, George William Curtis, Samuel Butler, T. S. Eliot, A. E. Housman, Oscar Hammerstein II, Edgar Allan Poe, Charles E. Carryl, Samuel Johnson, Thomas Carlyle, Edward Lear, Henry David Thoreau, Sophocles, Robert Frost, and Charles Darwin.

== Adaptations ==
In 2009, Audible.com produced an audio version of Galapagos, narrated by Jonathan Davis, as part of its Modern Vanguard line of audiobooks.

In 2014, artists Tucker Marder and Christian Scheider adapted "Galapagos" into a live theatrical performance at the new Parrish Art Museum in Watermill, N.Y. Endorsed by the Kurt Vonnegut Estate, the multi-media production featured 26 performers including Bob Balaban; live orchestral underscoring composed and conducted by Forrest Gray featuring Max Feldschuh on vibraphone and Ken Sacks on mbira; animal costumes by Isla Hansen; a three-story scenic design by Shelby Jackson; experimental video projections by James Bayard; and choreography by Matt Davies.

In 2019, Canadian band The PepTides released a ten-song collection titled "Galápagos Vol.1", inspired by the themes and characters in Galápagos.

== See also ==
- Devolution – Notion that species can revert to primitive forms
- Dysgenics – Decrease in genetic traits deemed desirable
