= Kurt Vonnegut =

American author (1922–2007)

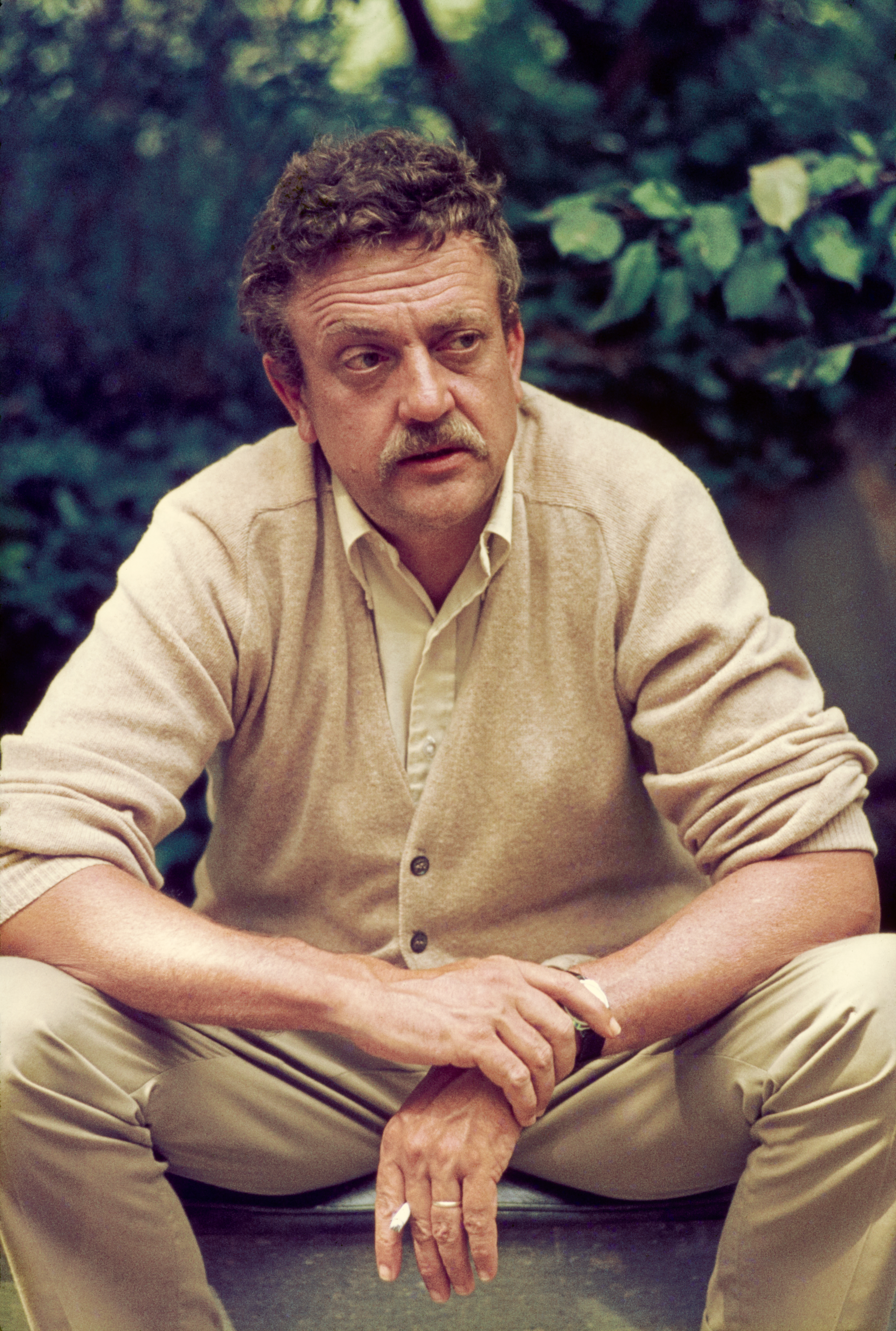
- Vonnegut in 1965
- Born: Kurt Vonnegut Jr. November 11, 1922; Indianapolis, Indiana, U.S.
- Died: April 11, 2007 (aged 84); New York City, U.S.
- Education: Cornell University; Carnegie Mellon University; University of Tennessee; University of Chicago (MA)
- Occupation: Author
- Spouses: Jane Marie Cox (m. 1945; div. 1971); Jill Krementz (m. 1979)
- Children: 7, (Note: 4 adopted) including Mark, Edith and Steve Adams
- Writing career
- Years active: 1951–2007
- Genre: Satire, dark humor, science fiction
- Notable works: Slaughterhouse-Five; Cat's Cradle
- Movement: Postmodernism

Kurt Vonnegut (/ˈvɒnəɡət/ VON-ə-gət; November 11, 1922 – April 11, 2007) was an American author known for his satirical and darkly humorous novels. His published work includes fourteen novels, three short-story collections, five plays, and five nonfiction works over fifty years; further works have been published since his death.

Born and raised in Indianapolis, Vonnegut attended Cornell University, but withdrew in January 1943 and enlisted in the U.S. Army. As part of his training, he studied mechanical engineering at the Carnegie Institute of Technology and the University of Tennessee. He was then deployed to Europe to fight in World War II and was captured by the Germans during the Battle of the Bulge. He was interned in Dresden, where he survived the Allied bombing of the city in a meat locker of the slaughterhouse where he was imprisoned. After the war, he married Jane Marie Cox. He and his wife both attended the University of Chicago while he worked as a night reporter for the City News Bureau.

Vonnegut published his first novel, Player Piano, in 1952. It received favorable reviews yet sold poorly. In the nearly 20 years that followed, several well-regarded novels were published, including The Sirens of Titan (1959) and Cat's Cradle (1963), both of which were nominated for the Hugo Award for best science fiction novel of the year. His short-story collection, Welcome to the Monkey House, was published in 1968.

Vonnegut's breakthrough was his commercially and critically successful sixth novel, Slaughterhouse-Five (1969). Its anti-war sentiment resonated with its readers amid the Vietnam War, and its reviews were generally positive. It rose to the top of The New York Times Best Seller list and made Vonnegut famous. Later in his career, Vonnegut published autobiographical essays and short-story collections such as Fates Worse Than Death (1991) and A Man Without a Country (2005). He has been hailed for his darkly humorous commentary on American society. His son Mark published a compilation of his work, Armageddon in Retrospect, in 2008. In 2017, Seven Stories Press published Complete Stories, a collection of Vonnegut's short fiction.

== Biography ==
=== Family and early life ===
Vonnegut was born in Indianapolis, on November 11, 1922, the youngest of three children of Kurt Vonnegut Sr. and his wife Edith (née Lieber). His older siblings were Bernard and Alice. He descended from a long line of German Americans; his paternal great-grandfather, Clemens Vonnegut, settled in Indianapolis and founded the Vonnegut Hardware Company. His father and grandfather Bernard were architects; the architecture firm under Kurt Sr. designed such buildings as Das Deutsche Haus (now called "The Athenæum"), the Indiana headquarters of the Bell Telephone Company, and the Fletcher Trust Building. Vonnegut's mother was born into Indianapolis's Gilded Age high society, as her family, the Liebers, were among the wealthiest in the city based on a fortune derived from a successful brewery.

Both of Vonnegut's parents were fluent speakers of German, but pervasive anti-German sentiment during and after World War I caused them to abandon German culture. Many German Americans were told at the time that this was a precondition for American patriotism; thus, his parents did not teach Vonnegut to speak German or introduce him to German literature, cuisine, or traditions, leaving him feeling "ignorant and rootless."

Vonnegut credited Ida Young, his family's African-American cook and housekeeper during the first decade of his life, for raising him and giving him values. He later said, "she gave me decent moral instruction and was exceedingly nice to me," and "was as great an influence on me as anybody." He described her as "humane and wise" and added that "the compassionate, forgiving aspects of [his] beliefs" came from her.

The financial security and social prosperity that the Vonneguts had once enjoyed were destroyed in a matter of years. The Liebers' brewery closed down in 1921 after the advent of Prohibition. When the Great Depression hit, few people could afford to build, causing clients at Kurt Sr.'s architectural firm to become scarce. Vonnegut's brother and sister had finished their primary and secondary educations in private schools, but Vonnegut was placed in a public school called Public School No. 43 (now the James Whitcomb Riley School). He was bothered by the Great Depression, (Note: In fact, Vonnegut often described himself as a "child of the Great Depression." He also stated the Depression and its effects incited pessimism about the validity of the American Dream.) and both his parents were affected deeply by their economic misfortune. His father withdrew from normal life and became what Vonnegut called a "dreamy artist." His mother became depressed, withdrawn, bitter, and abusive. She labored to regain the family's wealth and status, and Vonnegut said that she expressed hatred for her husband that was "as corrosive as hydrochloric acid." She often tried in vain to sell short stories she had written to Collier's, The Saturday Evening Post, and other magazines.

=== High school and Cornell University ===
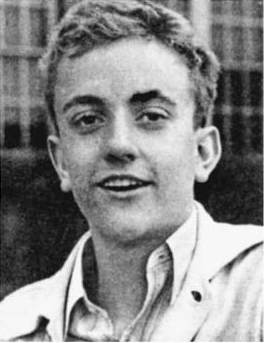
Vonnegut as a teenager, from the Shortridge High School 1940 yearbook

Vonnegut enrolled at Shortridge High School in Indianapolis in 1936. While there, he played clarinet in the school band and became a co-editor (along with Madelyn Pugh) of the Tuesday edition of the school newspaper, The Shortridge Echo. Vonnegut said that his tenure with the Echo allowed him to write for a large audience—his fellow students—rather than for a teacher, an experience, he said, which was "fun and easy." "It just turned out that I could write better than a lot of other people," Vonnegut observed. "Each person has something he can do easily and can't imagine why everybody else has so much trouble doing it."

After graduating from Shortridge in 1940, Vonnegut enrolled at Cornell University in Ithaca, New York. He wanted to study the humanities and had aspirations of becoming an architect like his father, but his father (Note: Kurt Sr. was embittered by his own lack of work as an architect during the Great Depression and feared a similar fate for his son. He dismissed his son's desired areas of study as "junk jewellery" and persuaded his son against following in his footsteps.) and brother Bernard, an atmospheric scientist, urged him to study a "useful" discipline. As a result, Vonnegut majored in biochemistry, but he had little proficiency in the area and was indifferent towards his studies. As his father had been a member of the Delta Upsilon fraternity at MIT, Vonnegut was entitled to join and did so. He overcame stiff competition for a place at the university's independent newspaper, The Cornell Daily Sun, first serving as a staff writer, then as an editor. By the end of his first year, he was writing a column titled "Innocents Abroad," which reused jokes from other publications. He later penned a piece titled "Well All Right" focusing on pacifism, a cause he strongly supported, arguing against US intervention in World War II.

=== World War II ===
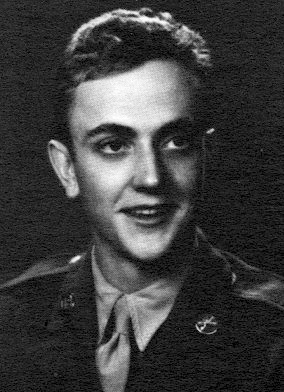
Vonnegut in army uniform during World War II

The attack on Pearl Harbor brought the United States into World War II. Vonnegut was a member of Cornell's Reserve Officers' Training Corps unit, but poor grades and a satirical article in Cornell's newspaper cost him his place there. He was placed on academic probation in May 1942 and dropped out the following January. No longer eligible for a deferment as a member of ROTC, he faced likely conscription into the U.S. Army. Instead of waiting to be drafted, he enlisted in the Army and in March 1943 reported to Fort Bragg, North Carolina, for basic training. Vonnegut was trained to fire and maintain howitzers and later received instruction in mechanical engineering at the Carnegie Institute of Technology and the University of Tennessee as part of the Army Specialized Training Program (ASTP).

In early 1944, the ASTP was canceled due to the Army's need for soldiers to support the D-Day invasion, and Vonnegut was ordered to an infantry battalion at Camp Atterbury, south of Indianapolis in Edinburgh, Indiana, where he trained as a scout. He lived so close to his home that he was "able to sleep in [his] own bedroom and use the family car on weekends".

On May 14, 1944, Vonnegut returned home on leave for Mother's Day weekend to discover that his mother had killed herself the previous night by overdosing on sleeping pills. Possible factors that contributed to Edith Vonnegut's suicide include the family's loss of wealth and status, Vonnegut's forthcoming deployment overseas, and her own lack of success as a writer. She was inebriated at the time and under the influence of prescription drugs.

Three months after his mother's suicide, Vonnegut was sent to Europe as an intelligence scout with the 106th Infantry Division. In December 1944, he fought in the Battle of the Bulge, one of the last German offensives of the war. On December 22, Vonnegut was captured along with about 50 other American soldiers. They were transported by boxcar to a prison camp south of Dresden, in the German province of Saxony. During the journey, the Royal Air Force mistakenly attacked the trains carrying Vonnegut and his fellow prisoners of war, killing about 150 of them. Vonnegut said Dresden was the "first fancy city [he had] ever seen"; he lived in a slaughterhouse and worked in a factory that made malt syrup for pregnant women. He recalled the air raid sirens going off whenever another city was being bombed. The Germans did not expect Dresden to be bombed, however. According to Vonnegut, "There were very few air-raid shelters in town and no war industries, just cigarette factories, hospitals, clarinet factories."

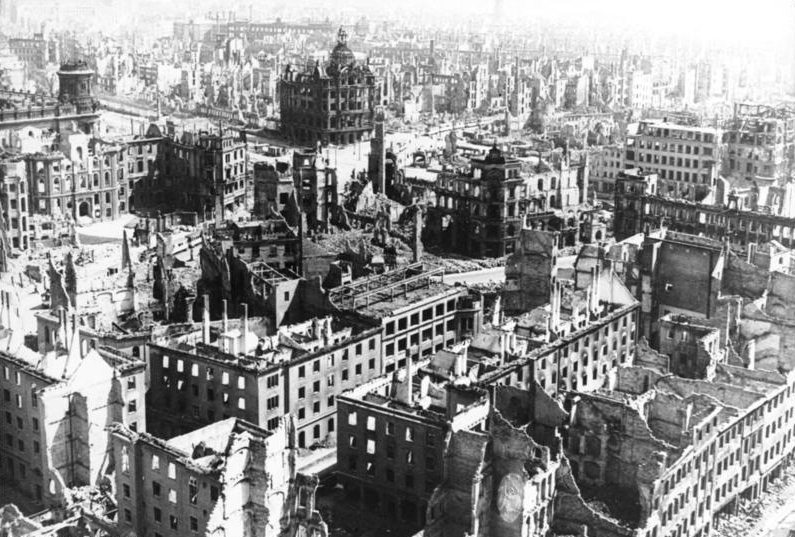
Dresden in 1945. More than 90% of the city's centre was destroyed.

On February 13, 1945, Dresden became the target of British and American air forces. In the hours and days that followed, the Allies engaged in sustained firebombing of the city. The offensive subsided on February 15, with about 25,000 civilians killed in the bombing. Vonnegut marveled at the level of both the destruction in Dresden and the secrecy that attended it. He had survived by taking refuge in a meat locker three stories underground. "It was cool there, with cadavers hanging all around," Vonnegut said. "When we came up the city was gone ... They burnt the whole damn town down." Vonnegut and other American prisoners were put to work immediately after the bombing, excavating bodies from the rubble. He described the activity as a "terribly elaborate Easter-egg hunt."

When U.S. General George S. Patton's 3rd Army captured Leipzig, some 70 miles (110 km) away, the American POWs were evacuated on foot to the border of Saxony and Czechoslovakia. After the captives were abandoned by their guards, Vonnegut reached a prisoner-of-war repatriation camp in Le Havre, France, in May 1945, with the assistance of the Soviet Army, which had liberated that part of Germany. Sent back to the United States, he was stationed at Fort Riley, Kansas, typing discharge papers for other soldiers. Soon after, he was awarded a Purple Heart, about which he remarked: "I myself was awarded my country's second-lowest decoration, a Purple Heart for frost-bite." He was discharged from the U.S. Army and returned to Indianapolis.

=== Marriage, University of Chicago, and early employment ===
After he returned to the United States, 22-year-old Vonnegut married Jane Marie Cox, his high-school girlfriend and classmate since kindergarten, on September 1, 1945. The pair moved to Chicago; there, Vonnegut enrolled in the University of Chicago on the G.I. Bill, as an anthropology student in an unusual five-year joint undergraduate/graduate program that conferred a master's degree. He studied under anthropologist Robert Redfield, his "most famous professor." He also worked as a reporter for the City News Bureau of Chicago.

Jane, who had graduated Phi Beta Kappa from Swarthmore, accepted a scholarship from the university to study Russian literature as a graduate student. She dropped out of the program after becoming pregnant with the couple's first child, Mark (born May 1947), while Kurt also left the university without a degree (despite having completed his undergraduate education). Vonnegut failed to write a dissertation, as his ideas had all been rejected. One abandoned topic was about the Ghost Dance and Cubist movements. A later topic, rejected "unanimously," had to do with the shapes of stories. Vonnegut received his graduate degree in anthropology 25 years after he left, when the university accepted his novel Cat's Cradle in lieu of his master's thesis.

Shortly thereafter, General Electric (GE) hired Vonnegut as a technical writer, then publicist, for the company's Schenectady, New York, News Bureau, a publicity department that operated like a newsroom. His brother Bernard had worked at GE since 1945, focusing mainly on a silver-iodide-based cloud seeding project that quickly became a joint GE–U.S. Army Signal Corps program, Project Cirrus. In The Brothers Vonnegut, Ginger Strand draws connections between many real events at General Electric, including Bernard's work, and Vonnegut's early stories, which were regularly being rejected everywhere he sent them. Throughout this period, Jane Vonnegut encouraged him, editing his stories, strategizing about submissions and buoying his spirits.

In 1949, Kurt and Jane had a daughter named Edith. Still working for GE, Vonnegut had his first piece, titled "Report on the Barnhouse Effect," published in the February 11, 1950, issue of Collier's, for which he received $750. The story concerned a scientist who fears that his invention will be used as a weapon, much as Bernard was fearing at the time about his cloudseeding work. Vonnegut wrote another story, after being coached by the fiction editor at Collier's, Knox Burger, and again sold it to the magazine, this time for $950. While Burger supported Vonnegut's writing, he was shocked when Vonnegut quit GE as of January 1, 1951, later stating: "I never said he should give up his job and devote himself to fiction. I don't trust the freelancer's life, it's tough." Nevertheless, in early 1951 Vonnegut moved with his family to Cape Cod, Massachusetts, to write full time, leaving GE behind. He initially moved to Osterville, but he ended up purchasing a home in Barnstable.

=== First novel ===
In 1952, Vonnegut's first novel, Player Piano, was published by Scribner's. The novel has a post-World War III setting, in which factory workers have been replaced by machines. Player Piano draws upon Vonnegut's experience as an employee at GE. The novel is set at a General Electric-like company and includes many scenes based on things Vonnegut saw there. He satirizes the drive to climb the corporate ladder, one that in Player Piano is rapidly disappearing as automation increases, putting even executives out of work. His central character, Paul Proteus, has an ambitious wife, a backstabbing assistant, and a feeling of empathy for the poor. Sent by his boss, Kroner, as a double agent among the poor (who have all the material goods they want, but little sense of purpose), he leads them in a machine-smashing, museum-burning revolution. Player Piano expresses Vonnegut's opposition to McCarthyism, something made clear when the Ghost Shirts, the revolutionary organization Paul penetrates and eventually leads, is referred to by one character as "fellow travelers."

In Player Piano, Vonnegut originates many of the techniques he would use in his later works. The comic, heavy-drinking Shah of Bratpuhr, an outsider to this dystopian corporate United States, is able to ask many questions that an insider would not think to ask, or would cause offense by doing so. For example, when taken to see the artificially intelligent supercomputer EPICAC, the Shah asks it "what are people for?" and receives no answer. Speaking for Vonnegut, he dismisses it as a "false god." This type of alien visitor would recur throughout Vonnegut's later novels.

The New York Times writer and critic Granville Hicks gave Player Piano a positive review, favorably comparing it to Aldous Huxley's Brave New World. Hicks called Vonnegut a "sharp-eyed satirist." None of the reviewers considered the novel particularly important. Several editions were printed—one by Bantam with the title Utopia 14, and another by the Doubleday Science Fiction Book Club—whereby Vonnegut gained the reputation as a writer of science fiction, a genre held in disdain by writers at that time. He defended the genre and deplored a perceived sentiment that "no one can simultaneously be a respectable writer and understand how a refrigerator works."

=== Struggling writer ===
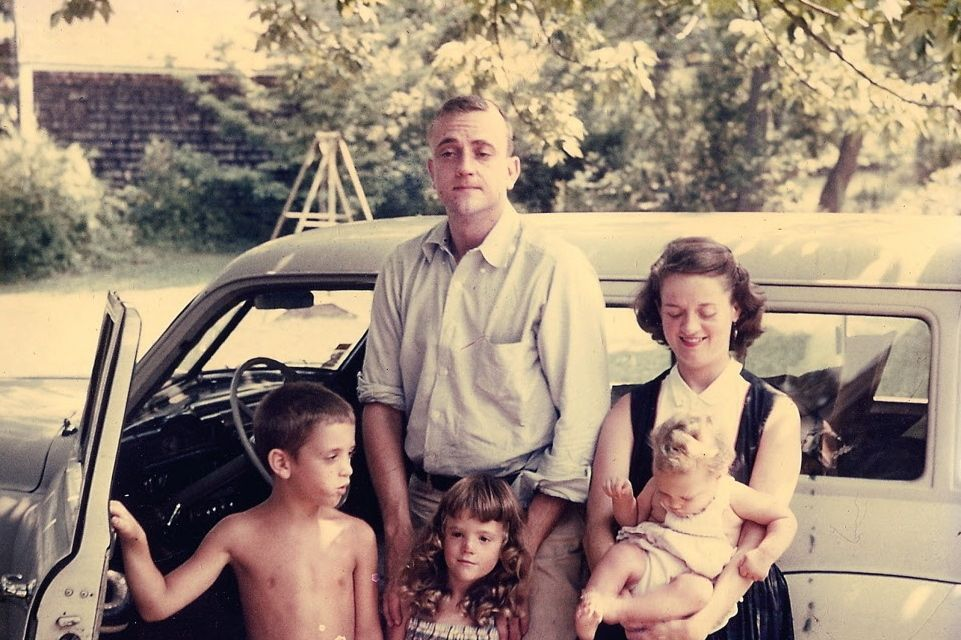
Vonnegut with his wife Jane and children (from left to right): Mark, Edith and Nanette, in 1955

After Player Piano, Vonnegut continued to sell short stories to various magazines. Contracted to produce a second novel (which eventually became Cat's Cradle), he struggled to complete it, and the work languished for years. In 1954, the couple had a third child, Nanette. With a growing family and no financially successful novels yet, Vonnegut's short stories helped to sustain the family, though he frequently needed to find additional sources of income. In 1957, he and a partner opened a Saab automobile dealership on Cape Cod, but it went bankrupt by the end of the year. He designed a World War II–themed board game called "GHQ" (General Headquarters), but publishers did not buy it.

In 1958, his sister, Alice, died of cancer two days after her husband, James Carmalt Adams, was killed in a train accident. The Vonneguts took in three of the Adamses' young sons—James, Steven, and Kurt, aged 14, 11, and 9, respectively. A fourth Adams son, Peter, age 2, also stayed with the Vonneguts for about a year before being given to the care of a paternal relative in Georgia.

Grappling with family challenges, Vonnegut continued to write, publishing novels vastly dissimilar in terms of plot.

The Sirens of Titan (1959) features a Martian invasion of Earth as experienced by a bored billionaire, Malachi Constant. He meets Winston Niles Rumfoord, an aristocratic space traveler, who is virtually omniscient but stuck in a time warp that causes him to appear on Earth only every 59 days. The billionaire learns that his actions and the events of all of history are determined by a race of robotic aliens from the planet Tralfamadore, who need a replacement part that can only be produced by an advanced civilization in order to repair their spaceship and return home. Human history has been manipulated to produce it. Some human structures, such as the Kremlin, are coded signals from the aliens to their ship as to how long it may expect to wait for the repair to take place. Reviewers were uncertain what to think of the book, with one comparing it to Offenbach's opera The Tales of Hoffmann.

Rumfoord, who is based on Franklin D. Roosevelt, physically resembles the former president. Rumfoord is described this way: he "put a cigarette in a long, bone cigarette holder, lighted it. He thrust out his jaw. The cigarette holder pointed straight up." William Rodney Allen, in his guide to Vonnegut's works, stated that Rumfoord foreshadowed the fictional political figures who would play major roles in God Bless You, Mr. Rosewater and Jailbird.

Mother Night, published in 1961, received little attention at the time of its publication. Howard W. Campbell Jr., Vonnegut's protagonist, is an American who is raised in Germany from age 11 and joins the Nazi Party during the war as a double agent for the US Office of Strategic Services, rising to the regime's highest ranks as a radio propagandist. After the war, the spy agency refuses to clear his name, and he is eventually imprisoned by the Israelis in the same cell block as Adolf Eichmann. Vonnegut wrote in a foreword to a later edition, "We are what we pretend to be, so we must be careful about what we pretend to be." Literary critic Lawrence Berkove considered the novel, like Mark Twain's Adventures of Huckleberry Finn, to illustrate the tendency for "impersonators to get carried away by their impersonations, to become what they impersonate and therefore to live in a world of illusion."

Also published in 1961 was Vonnegut's short story "Harrison Bergeron," set in a dystopic future where all are equal, even if that means disfiguring beautiful people and forcing the strong or intelligent to wear devices that negate their advantages. Fourteen-year-old Harrison is a genius and athlete forced to wear record-level "handicaps" and imprisoned for attempting to overthrow the government. He escapes to a television studio, tears away his handicaps, and frees a ballerina from her lead weights. As they dance, they are killed by the Handicapper General, Diana Moon Glampers. Vonnegut, in a later letter, suggested that "Harrison Bergeron" might have sprung from his envy and self-pity as a high-school misfit. In his 1976 biography of Vonnegut, Stanley Schatt suggested that the short story shows that "in any leveling process, what really is lost, according to Vonnegut, is beauty, grace, and wisdom." Darryl Hattenhauer, in his 1998 journal article on "Harrison Bergeron," theorized that the story was a satire on American Cold War understandings of communism and socialism.

With Cat's Cradle (1963), Allen wrote, "Vonnegut hit full stride for the first time." The narrator, John, intends to write of Dr. Felix Hoenikker, one of the fictional fathers of the atomic bomb, seeking to cover the scientist's human side. Hoenikker, in addition to the bomb, has developed another threat to mankind, "ice-nine," which is solid water stable at room temperature but more dense than liquid water. If a particle of ice-nine is dropped in water, all of the surrounding water becomes ice-nine. Felix Hoenikker is based on Bernard Vonnegut's boss at the GE Research Lab, Irving Langmuir, and the way ice-nine is described in the novel is reminiscent of how Bernard Vonnegut explained his own invention, silver iodide cloudseeding, to Kurt. Much of the second half of the book is spent on the fictional Caribbean island of San Lorenzo, where John explores a religion called Bokononism, whose holy books (excerpts from which are quoted) give the novel the moral core science does not supply. After the oceans are converted to ice-nine, wiping out most of humankind, John wanders the frozen surface, seeking to save himself and to make sure that his story survives.

Vonnegut based the title character of God Bless You, Mr. Rosewater (1964) on an accountant he knew in Cape Cod who specialized in clients in trouble he often had to comfort. Eliot Rosewater, the wealthy son of a Republican senator, seeks to atone for his wartime killing of noncombatant firefighters by serving in a volunteer fire department and giving away money to those in trouble or need. Stress from a battle for control of his charitable foundation pushes him over the edge, and he is placed in a mental hospital. He recovers and ends the financial battle by declaring the children of his county to be his heirs. Allen deemed God Bless You, Mr. Rosewater more "a cry from the heart than a novel under its author's full intellectual control," that reflected family and emotional stresses Vonnegut was going through at the time.

In the mid-1960s, Vonnegut contemplated abandoning his writing career. In 1999, he wrote in The New York Times, "I had gone broke, was out of print and had a lot of kids..." But then, on the recommendation of an admirer, he received a surprise offer of a teaching job at the Iowa Writers' Workshop, employment that he likened to the rescue of a drowning man.

=== Slaughterhouse-Five ===
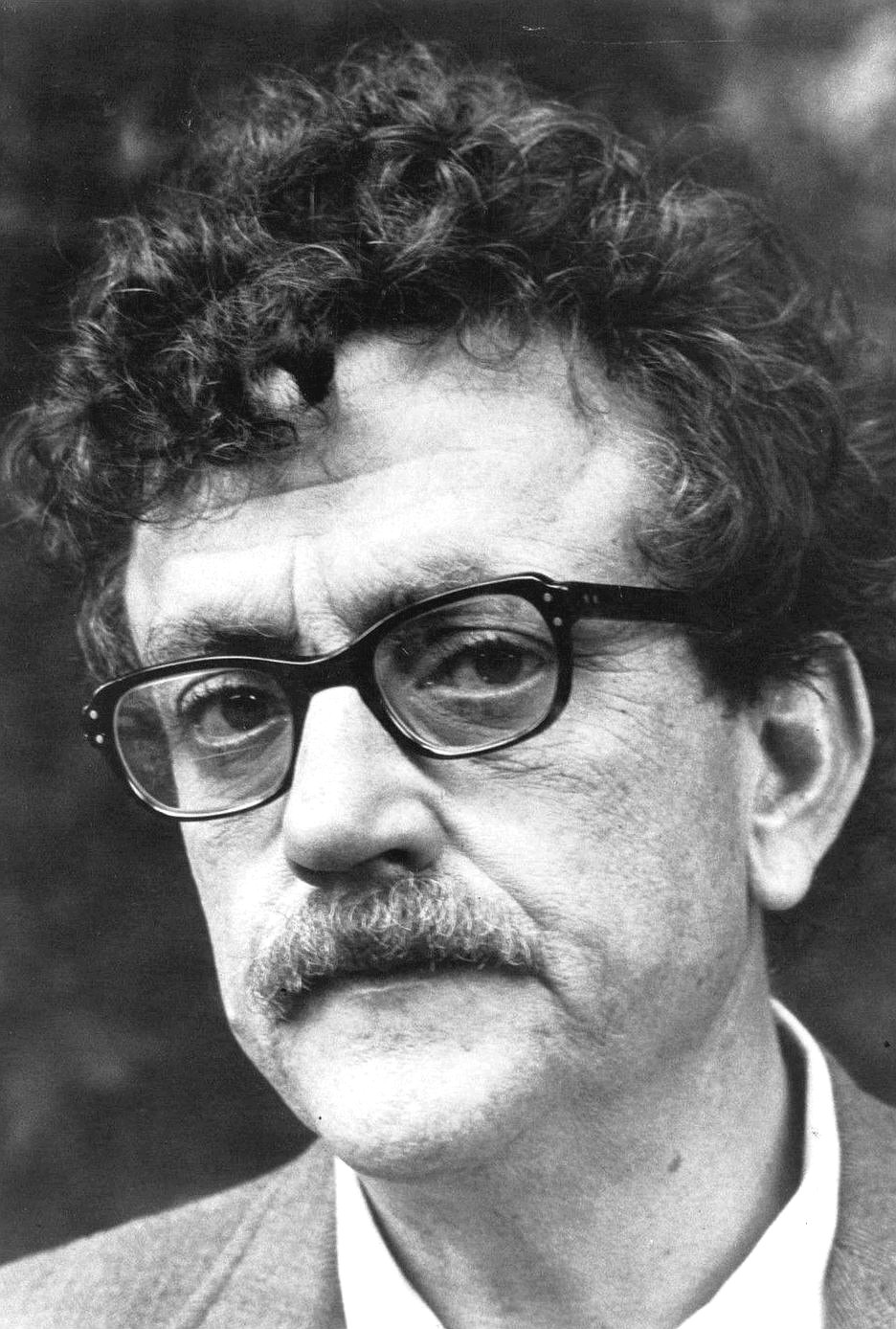
Vonnegut in 1972

After spending almost two years at the writer's workshop at the University of Iowa, teaching one course each term, Vonnegut was awarded a Guggenheim Fellowship for research in Germany. By the time he won it, in March 1967, he was becoming a well-known writer. He used the funds to travel in Eastern Europe, including to Dresden, where he found many prominent buildings still in ruins.

Vonnegut had been writing about his war experiences at Dresden ever since he returned from the war, but was unable to write anything that was acceptable to himself or his publishers; chapter one of Slaughterhouse-Five tells of his difficulties. Released in 1969, the novel rocketed Vonnegut to fame. It tells of the life of Billy Pilgrim, who like Vonnegut was born in 1922 and survives the firebombing of Dresden. The story is told in a non-linear fashion, with many of its climactic moments—Billy's death in 1976, his kidnapping by aliens from the planet Tralfamadore nine years earlier, and the execution of Billy's friend Edgar Derby in the ashes of Dresden for stealing a teapot—disclosed in the novel's first pages.

Slaughterhouse-Five received generally positive reviews, with Michael Crichton writing in The New Republic:

he writes about the most excruciatingly painful things. His novels have attacked our deepest fears of automation and the bomb, our deepest political guilts, our fiercest hatreds and loves. No one else writes books on these subjects; they are inaccessible to normal novelists.

The book went immediately to the top of The New York Times Best Seller list. Vonnegut's earlier works had appealed strongly to many college students, and the antiwar message of Slaughterhouse-Five resonated with a generation marked by the Vietnam War. He later stated that the loss of confidence in government that Vietnam caused finally allowed an honest conversation regarding events like Dresden.

In 1970, Vonnegut was also a correspondent in Biafra during the Nigerian Civil War.

=== Later life ===
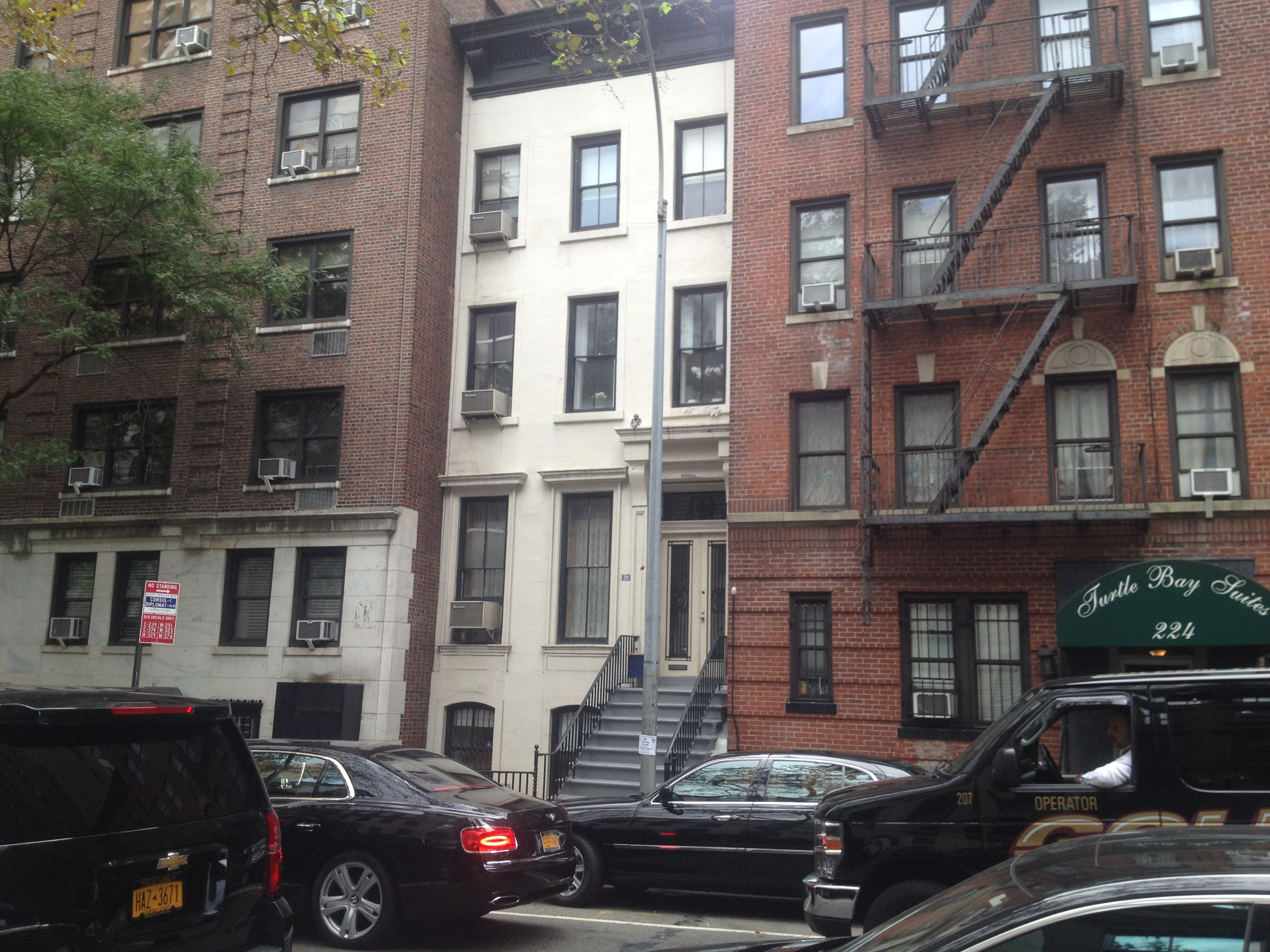
New York, 228 East 48th Street (center), Kurt Vonnegut's house from 1973 to 2007

After Slaughterhouse-Five was published, Vonnegut embraced the fame and financial security that attended its release. He was hailed as a hero of the burgeoning anti-war movement in the United States, was invited to speak at numerous rallies, and gave college commencement addresses around the country. In addition to briefly teaching at Harvard University as a lecturer in creative writing in 1970, Vonnegut taught at the City College of New York as a distinguished professor during the 1973–1974 academic year. He was later elected vice president of the National Institute of Arts and Letters and given honorary degrees by, among others, Indiana University and Bennington College. Vonnegut also wrote a play called Happy Birthday, Wanda June, which opened on October 7, 1970, at New York's Theatre de Lys. Receiving mixed reviews, it closed on March 14, 1971. In 1972, Universal Pictures adapted Slaughterhouse-Five into a film, which the author said was "flawless."

Requiem (ending)

When the last living thing
has died on account of us,
how poetical it would be
if Earth could say,
in a voice floating up
perhaps
from the floor
of the Grand Canyon,
"It is done."
People did not like it here.

— Kurt Vonnegut,
A Man Without a Country, 2005

Vonnegut's difficulties in his personal life thereafter materialized in numerous ways, including the painfully slow progress made on his next novel, the darkly comical Breakfast of Champions. In 1971, he stopped writing the novel altogether. When it was finally released in 1973, it was panned critically. In Thomas S. Hischak's book American Literature on Stage and Screen, Breakfast of Champions was called "funny and outlandish," but reviewers noted that it "lacks substance and seems to be an exercise in literary playfulness." Vonnegut's 1976 novel Slapstick, which meditates on the relationship between him and his sister (Alice), met a similar fate. In The New York Times's review of Slapstick, Christopher Lehmann-Haupt said that Vonnegut "seems to be putting less effort into [storytelling] than ever before" and that "it still seems as if he has given up storytelling after all." At times, Vonnegut was disgruntled by the personal nature of his detractors' complaints.

In subsequent years, his popularity resurged as he published several satirical books, including Jailbird (1979), Deadeye Dick (1982), Galápagos (1985), Bluebeard (1987), and Hocus Pocus (1990). Although he remained a prolific writer in the 1980s, Vonnegut struggled with depression and attempted suicide in 1984. Two years later, Vonnegut was seen by a younger generation when he played himself in Rodney Dangerfield's film Back to School. The last of Vonnegut's fourteen novels, Timequake (1997), was, as University of Detroit history professor and Vonnegut biographer Gregory Sumner said, "a reflection of an aging man facing mortality and testimony to an embattled faith in the resilience of human awareness and agency." Vonnegut's final book, a collection of essays entitled A Man Without a Country (2005), became a bestseller.

== Personal life ==
Vonnegut married his first wife, Jane Marie Cox, in 1945. She later embraced Christianity, which was contrary to Vonnegut's atheistic beliefs. After five of their six children had left home, Vonnegut said that the two were forced to find "other sorts of seemingly important work to do". The couple battled over their differing beliefs until Vonnegut moved from their Cape Cod home to New York in 1971. Vonnegut called the disagreements "painful" and said that the resulting split was a "terrible, unavoidable accident that we were ill-equipped to understand". The couple divorced but remained friends until Jane's death in late 1986.

Beyond his failed marriage, Vonnegut was deeply affected when his son Mark suffered a mental breakdown in 1972, which exacerbated Vonnegut's chronic depression and led him to take Ritalin. When he stopped taking the drug in the mid-1970s, he began to see a psychologist weekly.

In 1979, Vonnegut married Jill Krementz, a photographer whom he met while she was working on a series about writers in the early 1970s. With Jill, he adopted a daughter, Lily, when the baby was three days old. They remained married until his death.

Despite troubles in his personal life, Vonnegut maintained an active social presence in New York, as well as close friendships with several literary figures, including fellow Indianapolis native Dan Wakefield, Knox Burger, Norman Mailer, and Sidney Offit, whom Vonnegut described as his "best friend." After Vonnegut's death, Offit edited the Library of America's collection of Vonnegut's novels and short stories and contributed the foreword to a posthumous collection of short stories, Look at the Birdie.

== Death and legacy ==
Vonnegut's sincerity, his willingness to scoff at received wisdom, is such that reading his work for the first time gives one the sense that everything else is rank hypocrisy. His opinion of human nature was low, and that low opinion applied to his heroes and his villains alike—he was endlessly disappointed in humanity and in himself, and he expressed that disappointment in a mixture of tar-black humor and deep despair. He could easily have become a crank, but he was too smart; he could have become a cynic, but there was something tender in his nature that he could never quite suppress; he could have become a bore, but even at his most despairing he had an endless willingness to entertain his readers: with drawings, jokes, sex, bizarre plot twists, science fiction, whatever it took.

— Lev Grossman, Time, 2007

In a 2006 Rolling Stone interview, Vonnegut sardonically stated that he would sue the Brown & Williamson tobacco company, the maker of the Pall Mall-branded cigarettes he had been smoking since he was around 12 or 14 years old, for false advertising: "And do you know why? Because I'm 83 years old. The lying bastards! On the package Brown & Williamson promised to kill me."

Vonnegut died in Manhattan on the night of April 11, 2007, as a result of brain injuries incurred several weeks prior in a fall at his brownstone home. His death was reported by his wife, Jill. He was 84 years old. At the time of his death he had written fourteen novels, three short-story collections, five plays, and five nonfiction books. A book composed of his unpublished pieces, Armageddon in Retrospect, was compiled and posthumously published by his son Mark in 2008.

When asked about the impact Vonnegut had on his work, author Josip Novakovich stated that he has "much to learn from Vonnegut—how to compress things and yet not compromise them, how to digress into history, quote from various historical accounts, and not stifle the narrative. The ease with which he writes is sheerly masterly, Mozartian." Los Angeles Times columnist Gregory Rodriguez said that the author will "rightly be remembered as a darkly humorous social critic and the premier novelist of the counterculture", and Dinitia Smith of The New York Times dubbed Vonnegut the "counterculture's novelist".

External videos
- Tour of the Kurt Vonnegut Memorial Library, December 17, 2010, C-SPAN
- Presentation by Charles Shields on And So It Goes – Kurt Vonnegut: A Life, December 17, 2011, C-SPAN

Vonnegut has inspired numerous posthumous tributes and works. In 2008, the Kurt Vonnegut Society was established, and in November 2010, the Kurt Vonnegut Museum and Library was opened in Vonnegut's hometown of Indianapolis. The Library of America published a compendium of Vonnegut's compositions between 1963 and 1973 the following April, and another compendium of his earlier works in 2012. Late 2011 saw the release of two Vonnegut biographies: Gregory Sumner's Unstuck in Time and Charles J. Shields's And So It Goes. Shields's biography of Vonnegut created some controversy. According to The Guardian, the book portrays Vonnegut as distant, cruel and nasty. "Cruel, nasty and scary are the adjectives commonly used to describe him by the friends, colleagues, and relatives Shields quotes", said The Daily Beast's Wendy Smith. "Towards the end he was very feeble, very depressed and almost morose", said Jerome Klinkowitz of the University of Northern Iowa, who has examined Vonnegut in depth.

Like Mark Twain, Mr. Vonnegut used humor to tackle the basic questions of human existence: Why are we in this world? Is there a presiding figure to make sense of all this, a god who in the end, despite making people suffer, wishes them well?

— Dinitia Smith, The New York Times, 2007

Vonnegut's works have evoked ire on several occasions. His most prominent novel, Slaughterhouse-Five, has been objected to or removed at various institutions in at least 18 instances. In the case of Island Trees School District v. Pico, the United States Supreme Court ruled that a school district's ban on Slaughterhouse-Five—which the board had called "anti-American, anti-Christian, anti-Semitic, and just plain filthy"—and eight other novels was unconstitutional. When a school board in Republic, Missouri, decided to withdraw Vonnegut's novel from its libraries, the Kurt Vonnegut Memorial Library offered a free copy to all the students of the district.

Tally, writing in 2013, suggests that Vonnegut has only recently become the subject of serious study rather than fan adulation, and much is yet to be written about him. "The time for scholars to say 'Here's why Vonnegut is worth reading' has definitively ended, thank goodness. We know he's worth reading. Now tell us things we don't know." Todd F. Davis notes that Vonnegut's work is kept alive by his loyal readers, who have "significant influence as they continue to purchase Vonnegut's work, passing it on to subsequent generations and keeping his entire canon in print—an impressive list of more than twenty books that [Dell Publishing] has continued to refurbish and hawk with new cover designs." Donald E. Morse notes that Vonnegut "is now firmly, if somewhat controversially, ensconced in the American and world literary canon as well as in high school, college and graduate curricula". Tally writes of Vonnegut's work:

Vonnegut's 14 novels, while each does its own thing, together are nevertheless experiments in the same overall project. Experimenting with the form of the American novel itself, Vonnegut engages in a broadly modernist attempt to apprehend and depict the fragmented, unstable, and distressing bizarreries of postmodern American experience ... That he does not actually succeed in representing the shifting multiplicities of that social experience is beside the point. What matters is the attempt, and the recognition that ... we must try to map this unstable and perilous terrain, even if we know in advance that our efforts are doomed.

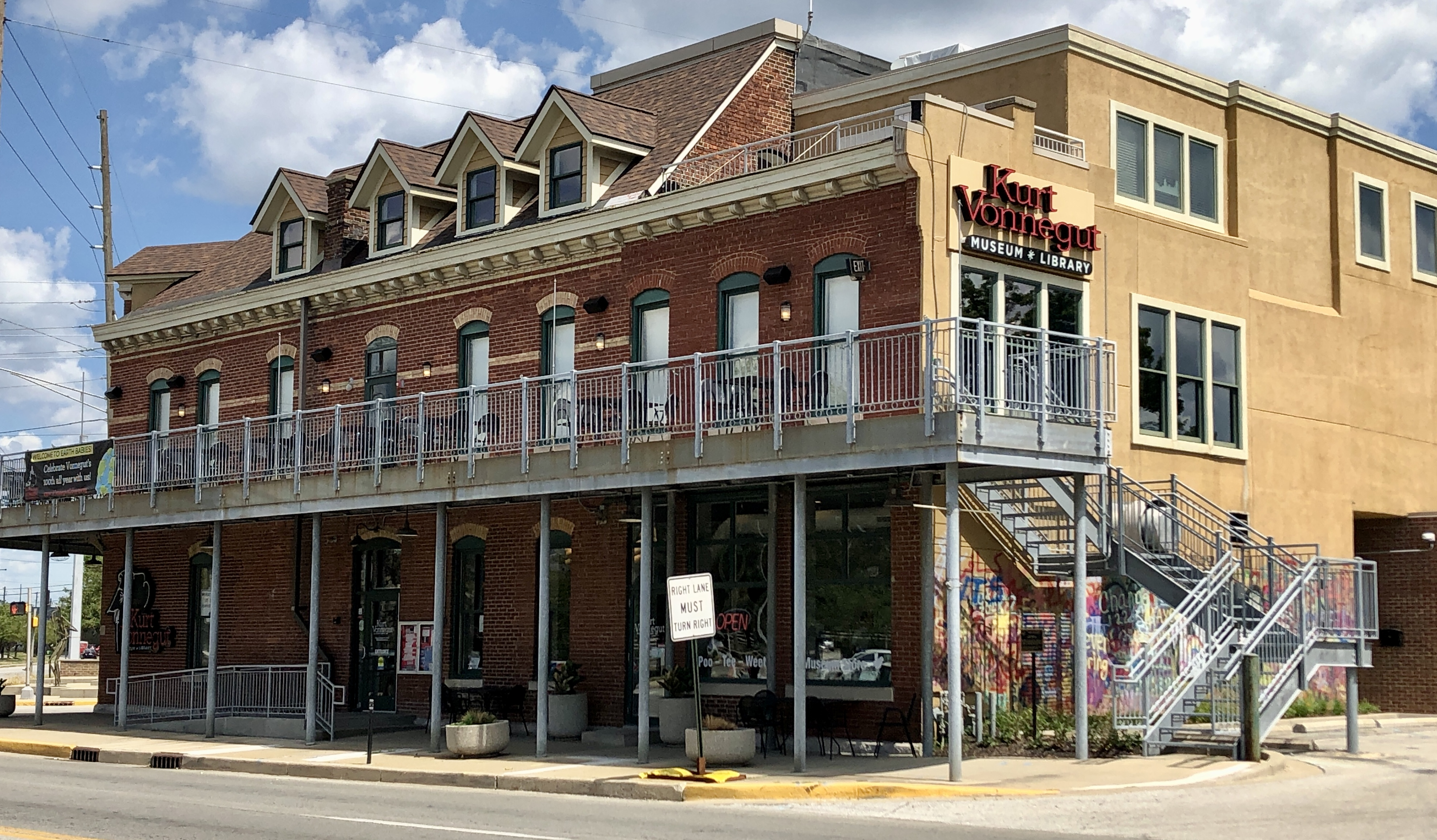
Kurt Vonnegut Museum and Library in Indianapolis in 2022

The Science Fiction and Fantasy Hall of Fame inducted Vonnegut posthumously in 2015. The asteroid 25399 Vonnegut is named in his honor. A crater on the planet Mercury has also been named in his honor. In 2021, the Kurt Vonnegut Museum and Library in Indianapolis was designated a Literary Landmark by the Literary Landmarks Association. In 1986, Vonnegut spoke at the dedication of the Bower-Suhrheinrich Library at the University of Evansville, where he was presented with an honorary Doctor of Letters.

== Views ==
The beliefs I have to defend are so soft and complicated, actually, and, when vivisected, turn into bowls of undifferentiated mush. I am a pacifist, I am an anarchist, I am a planetary citizen, and so on.

— Kurt Vonnegut

=== War ===
In the introduction to Slaughterhouse-Five, Vonnegut recounts meeting the film producer Harrison Starr at a party, who asked him whether his forthcoming book was an anti-war novel—"Yes, I guess", replied Vonnegut. Starr responded: "Why don't you write an anti-glacier novel?" In the novel, Vonnegut's character continues: "What he meant, of course, is that there would always be wars, that they were as easy to stop as glaciers. I believe that, too. And even if wars didn't keep coming like glaciers, there would still be plain old death." Vonnegut was a pacifist.

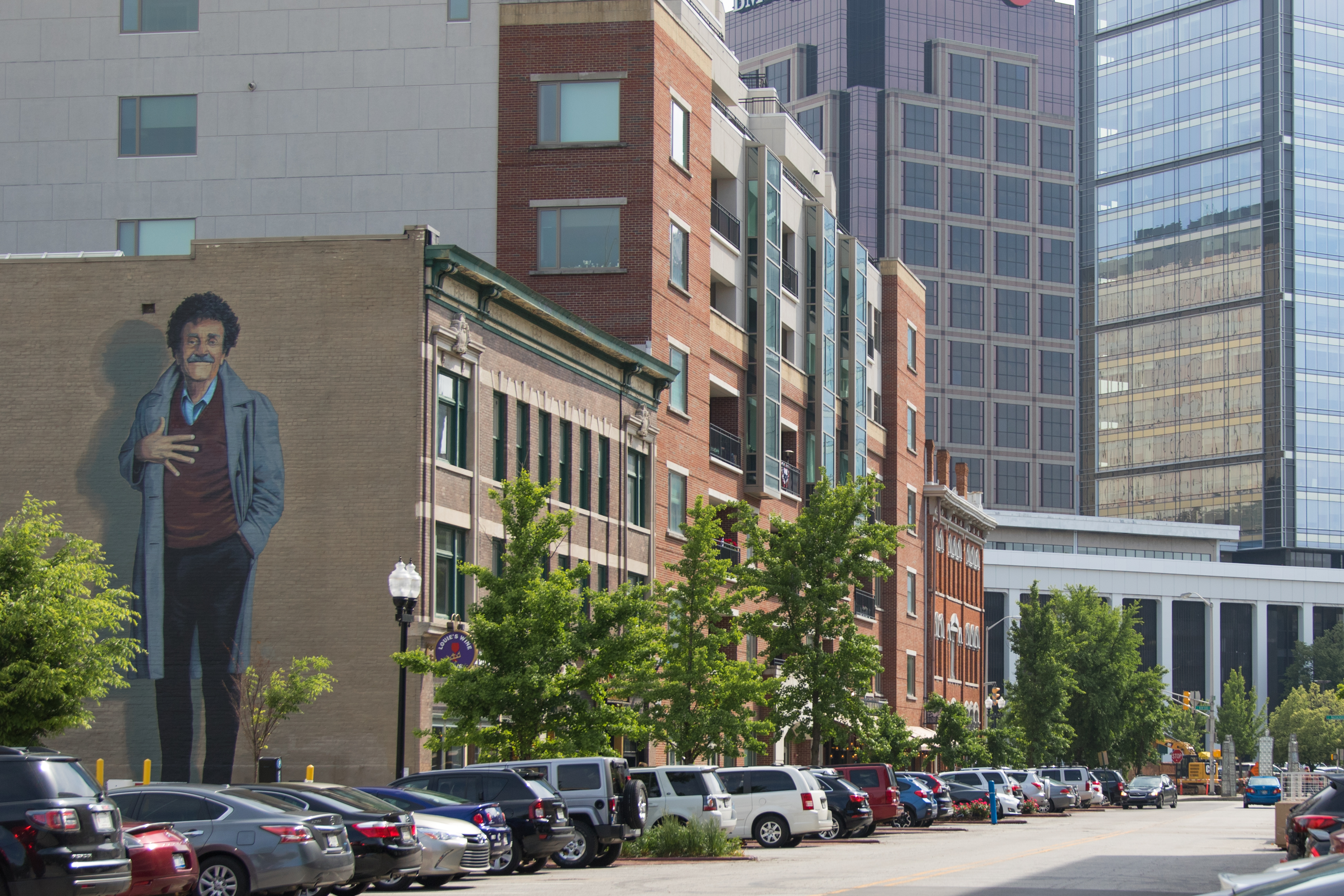
A large painting of Vonnegut on Massachusetts Avenue, Indianapolis, blocks away from the Kurt Vonnegut Museum and the Athenæum (Das Deutsche Haus), which was designed by his family's architecture firm

In 2011, NPR wrote, "Kurt Vonnegut's blend of anti-war sentiment and satire made him one of the most popular writers of the 1960s." Vonnegut stated in a 1987 interview, "My own feeling is that civilization ended in World War I, and we're still trying to recover from that," and that he wanted to write war-focused works without glamorizing war itself. Vonnegut had not intended to publish again, but his anger against the George W. Bush administration led him to write A Man Without a Country.

Slaughterhouse-Five is the Vonnegut novel best known for its antiwar themes, but the author expressed his beliefs in ways beyond the depiction of the destruction of Dresden. One character, Mary O'Hare, opines that "wars were partly encouraged by books and movies" starring "Frank Sinatra or John Wayne or some of those other glamorous, war-loving, dirty old men." Vonnegut made a number of comparisons in Slaughterhouse-Five between Dresden and the bombing of Hiroshima and wrote in Palm Sunday (1991), "I learned how vile that religion of mine could be when the atomic bomb was dropped on Hiroshima."

Nuclear war, or at least deployed nuclear arms, is mentioned in almost all of Vonnegut's novels. In Player Piano, the computer EPICAC is given control of the nuclear arsenal and is charged with deciding whether to use high-explosive or nuclear arms. In Cat's Cradle, John's original purpose in setting pen to paper was to write an account of what prominent Americans had been doing as Hiroshima was bombed.

=== Religion ===
Some of you may know that I am neither Christian nor Jewish nor Buddhist, nor a conventionally religious person of any sort. I am a humanist, which means, in part, that I have tried to behave decently without any expectation of rewards or punishments after I'm dead. ... I myself have written, "If it weren't for the message of mercy and pity in Jesus' Sermon on the Mount, I wouldn't want to be a human being. I would just as soon be a rattlesnake."

— Kurt Vonnegut, God Bless You, Dr. Kevorkian, 1999

Vonnegut was an atheist, a humanist and a freethinker, serving as the honorary president of the American Humanist Association. In an interview for Playboy, he stated that his forebears who came to the United States did not believe in God, and he learned his atheism from his parents. Vonnegut did not, however, disdain those who seek the comfort of religion, hailing church associations as a type of extended family. He occasionally attended a Unitarian church, but with little consistency. In his autobiographical work Palm Sunday, Vonnegut says that he is a "Christ-worshipping agnostic." During a speech to the Unitarian Universalist Association, he called himself a "Christ-loving atheist." However, he was keen to stress that he was not a Christian.

Vonnegut was an admirer of Jesus's Sermon on the Mount, particularly the Beatitudes, and incorporated it into his own doctrines. He also referred to it in many of his works. In his 1991 book Fates Worse than Death, Vonnegut suggests that during the Reagan administration, "anything that sounded like the Sermon on the Mount was socialistic or communistic, and therefore anti-American". In Palm Sunday, he wrote that "the Sermon on the Mount suggests a mercifulness that can never waver or fade." However, Vonnegut had a deep dislike for certain aspects of Christianity, often reminding his readers of the bloody history of the Crusades and other religion-inspired violence. He despised the televangelists of the late 20th century, feeling that their thinking was narrow-minded.

Religion features frequently in Vonnegut's work, both in his novels and elsewhere. He laced a number of his speeches with religion-focused rhetoric and was prone to using such expressions as "God forbid" and "thank God." He once wrote his own version of the Requiem Mass, which he then had translated into Latin and set to music. In God Bless You, Dr. Kevorkian, Vonnegut goes to heaven after he is euthanized by Dr. Jack Kevorkian. Once in heaven, he interviews 21 deceased celebrities, including Isaac Asimov, William Shakespeare, and Kilgore Trout—the last a fictional character from several of his novels. Vonnegut's works are filled with characters founding new faiths, and religion often serves as a major plot device, for example, in Player Piano, The Sirens of Titan and Cat's Cradle. In The Sirens of Titan, Rumfoord proclaims The Church of God the Utterly Indifferent. Slaughterhouse-Five sees Billy Pilgrim, lacking religion himself, nevertheless become a chaplain's assistant in the military and display a large crucifix on his bedroom wall. In Cat's Cradle, Vonnegut invented the religion of Bokononism.

=== Politics ===
Vonnegut's thoughts on politics were shaped in large part by Robert Redfield, an anthropologist at the University of Chicago, co-founder of the Committee on Social Thought, and one of Vonnegut's professors during his time at the university. In a commencement address, Vonnegut remarked that "Dr. Redfield's theory of the Folk Society ... has been the starting point for my politics, such as they are." Vonnegut did not particularly sympathize with liberalism or conservatism. Vonnegut also mused on the specious simplicity of American politics, saying facetiously: "If you want to take my guns away from me, and you're all for murdering fetuses, and love it when homosexuals marry each other ... you're a liberal. If you are against those perversions and for the rich, you're a conservative. What could be simpler?" Regarding political parties, Vonnegut said: "The two real political parties in America are the Winners and the Losers. The people don't acknowledge this. They claim membership in two imaginary parties, the Republicans and the Democrats, instead."

Vonnegut disdained more mainstream American political ideologies in favor of socialism, which he thought could provide a valuable substitute for what he saw as social Darwinism and a spirit of "survival of the fittest" in American society, believing that "socialism would be a good for the common man." Vonnegut often returned to a quote by socialist and four-time presidential candidate Eugene V. Debs: "As long as there is a lower class, I am in it. As long as there is a criminal element, I'm of it. As long as there is a soul in prison, I am not free." Vonnegut expressed disappointment that communism and socialism seemed to be unsavory topics to the average American and believed that they offered beneficial substitutes to contemporary social and economic systems.

=== Technology ===
In A Man Without a Country, Vonnegut quipped, "I have been called a Luddite. I welcome it. Do you know what a Luddite is? A person who hates newfangled contraptions." The negative effects of the progress of technology are a constant theme throughout Vonnegut's works, from Player Piano to his final essay collection, A Man Without a Country. Political theorist Patrick Deneen has identified this skepticism about technological progress as a theme of Vonnegut novels and stories, including Player Piano, "Harrison Bergeron," and "Tomorrow and Tomorrow and Tomorrow." Scholars who position Vonnegut as a critic of liberalism reference his pessimism toward technological progress. Vonnegut described Player Piano some years after its publication as "a novel about people and machines, and machines frequently got the best of it, as machines will." Loss of jobs due to machine innovation, and thus loss of meaning or purpose in life, is a key plot point in the novel. The "newfangled contraptions" Vonnegut hated included the television, which he critiqued often throughout his nonfiction and fiction. In Timequake, for example, Vonnegut tells the story of "Booboolings," human analogs who develop morally through their imaginative formation. However, one evil sister on the planet of the Booboolings learns from lunatics how to build televisions. He writes:

When the bad sister was a young woman, she and the nuts worked up designs for television cameras and transmitters and receivers. Then she got money from her very rich mom to manufacture these satanic devices, which made imaginations redundant. They were instantly popular because the shows were so attractive and no thinking was involved ... Generations of Booboolings grew up without imaginations ... Without imaginations, though, they couldn't do what their ancestors had done, which was read interesting, heartwarming stories in the faces of one another. So ... Booboolings became among the most merciless creatures in the local family of galaxies.

Against imagination-killing devices like televisions, and against electronic substitutes for embodied community, Vonnegut argued that "Electronic communities build nothing. You wind up with nothing. We are dancing animals. How beautiful it is to get up and go out and do something."

== Writing ==
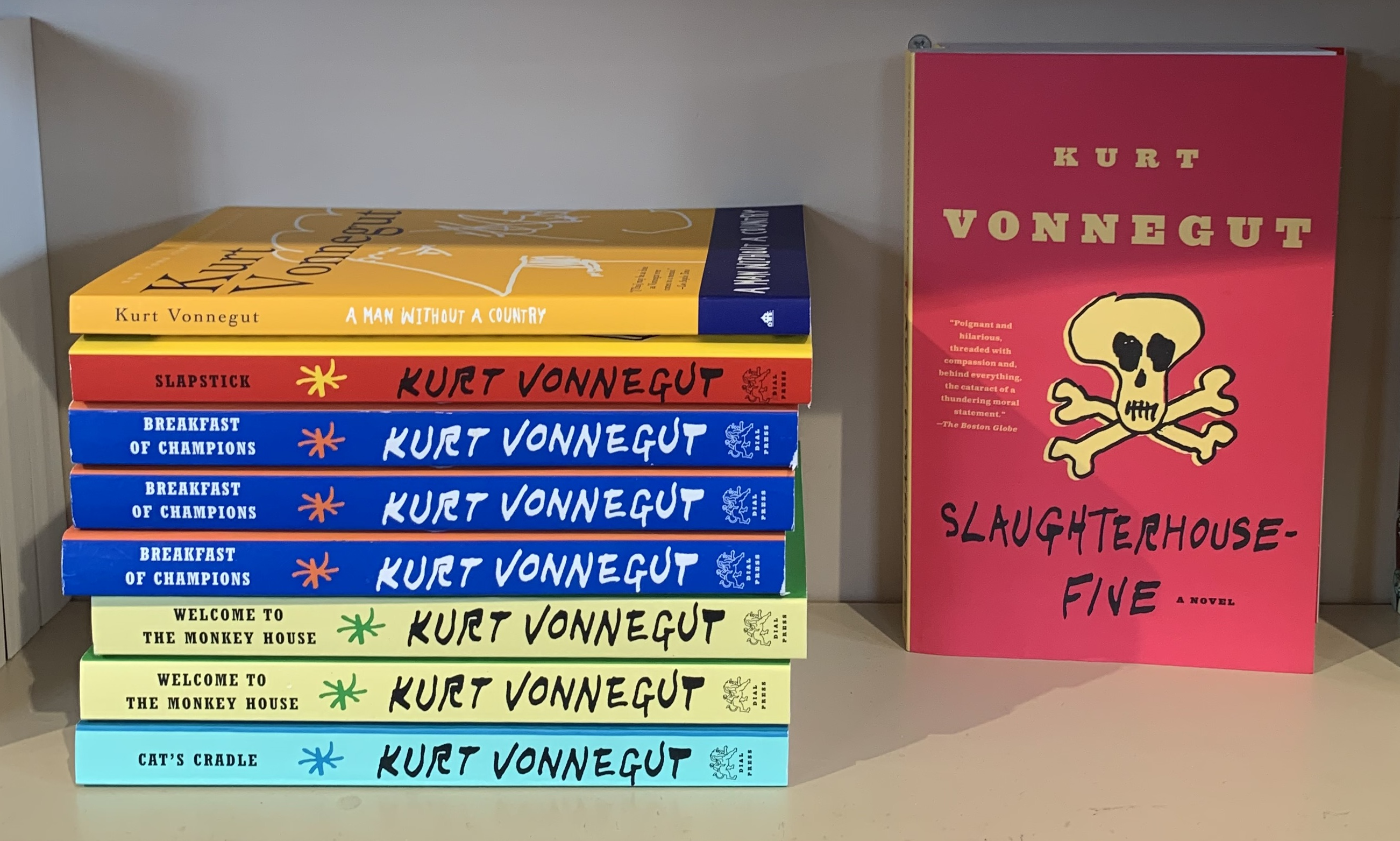
Kurt Vonnegut book display in New Orleans

=== Influences ===
Vonnegut's writing was inspired by an eclectic mix of sources. When he was younger, Vonnegut stated that he read works of pulp fiction, science fiction, fantasy, and action-adventure. He also read the classics, such as the plays of Aristophanes—like Vonnegut's works, humorous critiques of contemporary society. Vonnegut's life and work also share similarities with that of Mark Twain. Both shared pessimistic outlooks on humanity and a skeptical take on religion and, as Vonnegut put it, were both "associated with the enemy in a major war," as Twain briefly enlisted in the South's cause during the American Civil War, and Vonnegut's German name and ancestry connected him with the United States' enemy in both world wars. He also cited Ambrose Bierce as an influence, calling "An Occurrence at Owl Creek Bridge" the greatest American short story and deeming any who disagreed or had not read the story "twerps."

Vonnegut called George Orwell his favorite writer and admitted that he tried to emulate Orwell. "I like his concern for the poor, I like his socialism, I like his simplicity," Vonnegut said. Vonnegut also said that Orwell's Nineteen Eighty-Four and Brave New World by Aldous Huxley heavily influenced his debut novel, Player Piano, in 1952. The novel also included ideas from mathematician Norbert Wiener's book Cybernetics: Or Control and Communication in the Animal and the Machine. Vonnegut commented that Robert Louis Stevenson's stories were emblems of thoughtfully put together works that he tried to mimic in his own compositions. Vonnegut also hailed playwright and socialist George Bernard Shaw as "a hero of [his]" and an "enormous influence." Within his own family, Vonnegut stated that his mother, Edith, had the greatest influence on him. "[My] mother thought she might make a new fortune by writing for the slick magazines. She took short-story courses at night. She studied writers the way gamblers study horses."

Early on in his career, Vonnegut decided to model his style after that of Henry David Thoreau, who wrote as if from the perspective of a child, allowing Thoreau's works to be widely comprehensible. Using a youthful narrative voice allowed Vonnegut to deliver concepts in a modest and straightforward way. Other influences on Vonnegut include The War of the Worlds author H. G. Wells and satirist Jonathan Swift. Vonnegut credited American journalist and critic H. L. Mencken for inspiring him to become a journalist.

=== Style and technique ===
The book Pity the Reader: On Writing with Style by Kurt Vonnegut and his longtime friend and former student Suzanne McConnell, published posthumously by Rosetta Books and Seven Stories Press in 2019, delves into the style, humor, and methodologies Vonnegut employed, including his belief that one should "Write like a human being. Write like a writer."

I've heard the Vonnegut voice described as "manic depressive," and there's certainly something to this. It has an incredible amount of energy married to a very deep and dark sense of despair. It's frequently over-the-top, and scathingly satirical, but it never strays too far from pathos—from an immense sympathy for society's vulnerable, oppressed and powerless. But, then, it also contains a huge allotment of warmth. Most of the time, reading Kurt Vonnegut feels more like being spoken to by a very close friend. There's an inclusiveness to his writing that draws you in, and his narrative voice is seldom absent from the story for any length of time. Usually, it's right there in the foreground—direct, involving and extremely idiosyncratic.

— Gavin Extence, The Huffington Post, 2013

In his book Popular Contemporary Writers, Michael D. Sharp describes Vonnegut's linguistic style as straightforward, his sentences concise, his language simple, his paragraphs brief, and his ordinary tone conversational. Vonnegut uses this style to convey normally complex subject matter in a way that is intelligible to a large audience. He credited his time as a journalist for his ability and pointed to his work with the Chicago City News Bureau, which required him to convey stories in telephone conversations. Vonnegut's compositions include distinct references to his own life, notably in Slaughterhouse-Five and Slapstick.

Vonnegut believed that ideas and the convincing communication of those ideas to the reader were vital to literary art. He did not always sugarcoat his points; much of Player Piano leads to the moment when Paul, on trial and hooked to a lie detector, is asked to tell a falsehood. Paul says, "Every new piece of scientific knowledge is a good thing for humanity." Robert T. Tally Jr., in his volume on Vonnegut's novels, wrote, "Rather than tearing down and destroying the icons of twentieth-century, middle-class American life, Vonnegut gently reveals their basic flimsiness." Vonnegut did not simply propose utopian solutions to the ills of American society but showed how such schemes would not allow ordinary people to live lives free from want and anxiety. The large, artificial U.S. families in Slapstick soon serve as an excuse for tribalism. People give no help to those not part of their group; the extended family's place in the social hierarchy becomes vital.

In the introduction to their essay "Kurt Vonnegut and Humor", Tally and Peter C. Kunze suggest that Vonnegut was not a "black humorist," but a "frustrated idealist" who used "comic parables" to teach the reader absurd, bitter or hopeless truths, with his grim witticisms serving to make the reader laugh rather than cry. "Vonnegut makes sense through humor, which is, in the author's view, as valid a means of mapping this crazy world as any other strategies." Vonnegut resented being called a black humorist, feeling that, as with many literary labels, it allowed readers to disregard aspects of a writer's work that did not fit the label.

Vonnegut's works have been labeled science fiction, satire and postmodern. He resisted such labels, but his works do contain common tropes in those genres. In his books, Vonnegut imagines alien societies and civilizations, as is common in science fiction. He emphasizes or exaggerates absurdities and idiosyncrasies. Furthermore, Vonnegut makes fun of problems, as satire does. However, literary theorist Robert Scholes noted in Fabulation and Metafiction that Vonnegut "reject[s] the traditional satirist's faith in the efficacy of satire as a reforming instrument. [He has] a more subtle faith in the humanizing value of laughter."

Postmodernism entails a response to the theory that science will reveal truths. Postmodernists contend that truth is subjective rather than objective. Truth includes bias toward individual beliefs and outlooks on the world. Postmodernist writers use unreliable, first-person narration, and narrative fragmentation. One critic has argued that Vonnegut's most famous novel, Slaughterhouse-Five, features a metafictional, Janus-headed outlook and seeks to represent historical events while doubting the ability to represent history. Doubt is evident in the opening lines of the novel: "All this happened, more or less. The war parts, anyway, are pretty much true." The bombastic opening—"All this happened"—"reads like a declaration of complete mimesis," which is radically called into question in the rest of the quote and "[t]his creates an integrated perspective that seeks out extratextual themes [like war and trauma] while thematizing the novel's textuality and inherent constructedness at one and the same time." Although Vonnegut does use fragmentation and metafiction in some of his works, he more distinctly focuses on the peril of individuals who find subjective truths, mistake them for objective truths, and proceed to impose these truths on other people.

=== Themes ===
==== Economy ====
Vonnegut was a vocal critic of American society, and this was reflected in his writings. Several key social themes recur in Vonnegut's works, such as wealth, the lack of it, and its unequal distribution among a society. In The Sirens of Titan, the novel's protagonist, Malachi Constant, is exiled to Saturn's moon Titan as a result of his vast wealth, which has made him arrogant and wayward. In God Bless You, Mr. Rosewater, readers may find it difficult to determine whether the rich or the poor are in worse circumstances, as the lives of both groups' members are ruled by their wealth or their poverty. Further, in Hocus Pocus, the protagonist is named Eugene Debs Hartke, a homage to the famed socialist Eugene V. Debs and Vonnegut's socialist views.

In Kurt Vonnegut: A Critical Companion, Thomas F. Marvin states: "Vonnegut points out that, left unchecked, capitalism will erode the democratic foundations of the United States." Marvin suggests that Vonnegut's works demonstrate what happens when a "hereditary aristocracy" develops, where wealth is inherited along familial lines: the ability of poor Americans to overcome their situations is greatly or completely diminished. Vonnegut also often laments social Darwinism and a "survival of the fittest" view of society. He points out that social Darwinism leads to a society that condemns its poor for their own misfortune and fails to help them out of their poverty because "they deserve their fate".

==== Ethics in science ====
Science and the ethical obligations of scientists are also a common theme in Vonnegut's works. His first published story, "Report on the Barnhouse Effect," like many of his early stories, centered on a scientist concerned about the uses of his own invention. Player Piano and Cat's Cradle explore the effects on humans of scientific advances. In 1969, Vonnegut gave a speech to the American Association of Physics Teachers called "The Virtuous Physicist." Asked afterwards what a virtuous scientist was, Vonnegut replied, "one who declines to work on weapons."

==== Life ====
Vonnegut also confronts the idea of free will in a number of his pieces. In Slaughterhouse-Five and Timequake, the characters have no choice in what they do; in Breakfast of Champions, characters are very obviously stripped of their free will and even receive it as a gift; and in Cat's Cradle, Bokononism views free will as heretical.

The majority of Vonnegut's characters are estranged from their actual families and seek to build replacement or extended families. For example, the engineers in Player Piano called their manager's spouse "Mom". In Cat's Cradle, Vonnegut devises two separate methods for loneliness to be combated: A "karass", which is a group of individuals appointed by God to do his will, and a "granfalloon", defined by Marvin as a "meaningless association of people, such as a fraternal group or a nation". Similarly, in Slapstick, the US government codifies that all Americans are a part of large extended families.

Fear of losing one's purpose in life is a theme in Vonnegut's works. During the Great Depression, Vonnegut witnessed the devastation many people felt when they lost their jobs; and, while at General Electric, he witnessed machines being built to take the place of human labor. He confronts these things in his works through references to the growing use of automation and its effects on human society. This is most starkly represented in his first novel, Player Piano, where many Americans are left purposeless and unable to find work, as machines replace human workers. Loss of purpose is also depicted in Galápagos, where a florist rages at her spouse for creating a robot able to do her job, and in Timequake, where an architect kills himself when replaced by computer software.

Suicide by fire is another common theme in Vonnegut's works; the author often returns to the theory that "many people are not fond of life". He uses this as an explanation for why humans have so severely damaged their environment and made devices such as nuclear weapons that can make their creators extinct. In Deadeye Dick, Vonnegut features the neutron bomb, which is designed to kill people but leave buildings and structures untouched. He also uses this theme to demonstrate the recklessness of those who put powerful, apocalypse-inducing devices at the disposal of politicians.

"What is the point of life?" is a question Vonnegut often pondered in his works. When one of his characters, Kilgore Trout, finds the question "What is the purpose of life?" written in a bathroom, his response is, "To be the eyes and ears and conscience of the Creator of the Universe, you fool." Marvin finds Trout's theory curious, given that Vonnegut was an atheist and thus for him, there is no Creator to report back to, and comments that, "[as] Trout chronicles one meaningless life after another, readers are left to wonder how a compassionate creator could stand by and do nothing while such reports come in". In the epigraph to Bluebeard, Vonnegut quotes his son Mark and gives an answer to what he believes is the meaning of life: "We are here to help each other get through this thing, whatever it is."

==== Tralfamadore ====
A fictional planet called Tralfamadore is a recurring motif in Vonnegut's works. A planet by that name is referenced in The Sirens of Titan; God Bless You, Mr. Rosewater; Slaughterhouse-Five; Hocus Pocus; and Timequake. It is variously depicted as being located outside the Milky Way galaxy or being fictional within the fiction itself; in Slaughterhouse-Five, it is implied to be imaginary as a result of the protagonist losing his grip on reality. A recurring characteristic of the inhabitants of Tralfamadore is their low esteem of humanity. According to Julia A. Whitehead, Vonnegut used the concept of an imagined planet inhabited by beings more enlightened than humans as an outlet for escapism. By contrast, Lawrence R. Boer rejects the notion that the pessimism and fatalism of the Tralfamadorians in Slaughterhouse-Five reflect the views of the author, and Brian Stableford characterizes the different Tralfamadorian races in that book and The Sirens of Titan as "tiny-minded smartasses."

=== Awards and nominations ===
Award	Year	Category	Book	Result	Ref.
International Fantasy Award	1953	-	Player Piano	Nominated	-
Writers Guild of America Award	1960	Television script	"Auf Wiedersehen"	Won	-
Hugo Award	1960	Best Novel	The Sirens of Titan	Nominated	
Hugo Award	1964	Best Novel	Cat's Cradle	Nominated	
Nebula Award	1970	Best Novel	Slaughterhouse-Five	Nominated	
Hugo Award	1970	Best Novel	Slaughterhouse-Five	Nominated	
Drama Desk Award	1971	Outstanding New Play	Happy Birthday, Wanda June	Won	-
Seiun Award	1973	Foreign Novel	The Sirens of Titan	Won	-
Hugo Award for Best Dramatic Presentation	1973	Best Dramatic Presentation	Slaughterhouse-Five	Won	-
John W. Campbell Award	1986	Best Science Fiction Novel	Galápagos	Nominated	
Humanist of the Year	1992	-	-	Won	
Audie Award	2009	Short Stories/Collections	Armageddon in Retrospect	Won	-
Science Fiction and Fantasy Hall of Fame	2015	-	-	Inducted	-

== Works ==
Unless otherwise cited, items in this list are taken from Thomas F. Marvin's 2002 book Kurt Vonnegut: A Critical Companion, and the date in parentheses is the date the work was published:

=== Novels ===
- Player Piano (1952)
- The Sirens of Titan (1959)
- Mother Night (1962)
- Cat's Cradle (1963)
- God Bless You, Mr. Rosewater (1965), illustrated by Wayne Anderson in 1972
- Slaughterhouse-Five (1969)
- Breakfast of Champions (1973)
- Slapstick (1976)
- Jailbird (1979)
- Deadeye Dick (1982)
- Galápagos (1985)
- Bluebeard (1987)
- Hocus Pocus (1990)
- Timequake (1997)

=== Short fiction collections ===
- Canary in a Cat House (1961)
- Welcome to the Monkey House (1968)
- Bagombo Snuff Box (1997)
- God Bless You, Dr. Kevorkian (1999)
- Armageddon in Retrospect (2008) – short stories and essays
- Look at the Birdie (2009)
- While Mortals Sleep (2011)
- We Are What We Pretend to Be (2012)
- Sucker's Portfolio (2013)
- Complete Stories (2017)

=== Plays ===
- The First Christmas Morning (1962)
- Fortitude (1968)
- Happy Birthday, Wanda June (1970)
- Between Time and Timbuktu (1972)
- Stones, Time and Elements (A Humanist Requiem) (1987)
- Make Up Your Mind (1993)
- L'Histoire du Soldat (1997)

=== Nonfiction ===
- Wampeters, Foma and Granfalloons (1974)
- Palm Sunday (1981)
- Nothing Is Lost Save Honor: Two Essays (1984)
- Fates Worse Than Death (1991)
- A Man Without a Country (2005)
- Kurt Vonnegut: The Cornell Sun Years 1941–1943 (2012)
- If This Isn't Nice, What Is?: Advice to the Young (2013)
- Vonnegut by the Dozen (2013)
- Kurt Vonnegut: Letters (2014)
- Pity the Reader: On Writing With Style (2019) with Suzanne McConnell
- Love, Kurt: The Vonnegut Love Letters, 1941–1945 (2020) Editor Edith Vonnegut

=== Interviews ===
- Conversations with Kurt Vonnegut (1988) with William Rodney Allen
- Like Shaking Hands with God: A Conversation About Writing (1999) with Lee Stringer
- Kurt Vonnegut: The Last Interview: And Other Conversations (2011)

=== Children's books ===
- Sun Moon Star (1980)

=== Art ===
- Kurt Vonnegut Drawings (2014)

== See also ==
- List of peace activists

== General and cited sources ==
- Allen, William R. "A Brief Biography of Kurt Vonnegut". Kurt Vonnegut Memorial Library. Archived from the original on January 18, 2015.
- Allen, William R. (1991). Understanding Kurt Vonnegut. University of South Carolina Press. ISBN 978-0-87249-722-1.
- Banach, Je (April 11, 2013). "Laughing in the Face of Death: A Vonnegut Roundtable". The Paris Review.
- Barsamian, David (2004). Louder Than Bombs: Interviews from the Progressive Magazine. South End Press. ISBN 978-0-89608-725-5.
- Blount, Roy Jr. (May 4, 2008). "So It Goes". Sunday Book Review. The New York Times.
- Boomhower, Ray E. (1999). "Slaughterhouse-Five: Kurt Vonnegut Jr". Traces of Indiana and Midwestern History. 11 (2): 42–47. ISSN 1040-788X.
- "Obituary of Kurt Vonnegut: Guru of the counterculture whose science fiction novel Slaughterhouse-Five, inspired by his survival of the Dresden bombings, became an anti-war classic". The Daily Telegraph. May 13, 2007. p. 25.
- Dalton, Corey M. (October 24, 2011). "Treasures of the Kurt Vonnegut Memorial Library". The Saturday Evening Post. Archived from the original on December 9, 2014.
- Davis, Todd F. (2006). Kurt Vonnegut's Crusade. State University of New York Press. ISBN 978-0-7914-6675-9.
- Extence, Gavin (June 25, 2013). "Most of What I Know about Writing, I Learned from Kurt Vonnegut". The Huffington Post.
- Farrell, Susan E. (2009). Critical Companion to Kurt Vonnegut: A Literary Reference to His Life and Work. Infobase Publishing. ISBN 978-1-4381-0023-4.
- Freese, Peter (2013). "'Instructions for use': the opening chapter of Slaughterhouse-Five and the reader of historiographical metafictions". In Tally, Robert T. Jr. (ed.). Kurt Vonnegut. Critical Insights. Salem Press. pp. 95–117. ISBN 978-1-4298-3848-1.
- Gannon, Matthew; Taylor, Wilson (September 4, 2013). "The working class needs its next Kurt Vonnegut". Jacobin. Salon.com. Archived from the original on September 5, 2013.
- Grossman, Lev (April 12, 2007). "Kurt Vonnegut, 1922–2007". Time. Archived from the original on June 17, 2024.
- Harris, Paul (December 3, 2011). "Kurt Vonnegut's dark, sad, cruel side is laid bare". The Guardian.
- Hattenhauer, Darryl (1998). "The Politics of Kurt Vonnegut's 'Harrison Bergeron'". Studies in Short Fiction. 35 (4): 387–392. ISSN 0039-3789.
- Hayman, David; Michaelis, David; et al. (1977). "Kurt Vonnegut, The Art of Fiction No. 64". The Paris Review. 69: 55–103. Archived from the original on February 5, 2015.
- Hischak, Thomas S. (2012). American Literature on Stage and Screen: 525 Works and Their Adaptations. McFarland & Company. ISBN 978-0-7864-9279-4.
- Jensen, Mikkel (2016). "Janus-Headed Postmodernism: The Opening Lines of Slaughterhouse-Five". The Explicator. 74 (1): 8–11. doi:10.1080/00144940.2015.1133546. ISSN 1939-926X. S2CID 162509316.
- Kohn, Martin (March 28, 2001). "God Bless You Dr. Kevorkian listing". New York University School of Medicine. Archived from the original on September 24, 2021.
- Kunze, Peter C.; Tally, Robert T. Jr. (2012). "Vonnegut's sense of humor". Studies in American Humor. 3 (26): 7–11. doi:10.5325/studamerhumor.26.2012.0007 (inactive October 10, 2025). ISSN 0095-280X. S2CID 246645063.
- Leeds, Marc (1995). The Vonnegut Encyclopedia. Greenwood Press. ISBN 978-0-313-29230-9.
- Lehmann-Haupt, Christopher (September 24, 1976). "Books of The Times". The New York Times.
- Lowery, George (April 12, 2007). "Kurt Vonnegut Jr., novelist, counterculture icon and Cornellian, dies at 84". Cornell Chronicle. Archived from the original on November 8, 2014.
- Marvin, Thomas F. (2002). Kurt Vonnegut: A Critical Companion. Greenwood Publishing Group. ISBN 978-0-313-29230-9.
- Morais, Betsy (August 12, 2011). "The Neverending Campaign to Ban 'Slaughterhouse Five'". The Atlantic.
- Morse, Donald E. (2013). "The curious reception of Kurt Vonnegut". In Tally, Robert T. Jr. (ed.). Kurt Vonnegut. Critical Insights. Salem Press. pp. 42–59. ISBN 978-1-4298-3848-1.
- Morse, Donald E. (2003). The Novels of Kurt Vonnegut: Imagining Being an American. Greenwood Publishing Group. ISBN 978-0-313-29230-9.
- Niose, David A. (July 1, 2007). "Kurt Vonnegut saw humanism as a way to build a better world". The Humanist. Archived from the original on September 24, 2015 – via HighBeam Research.
- Noble, David (2017). "Forces of Production: A Social History of Industrial Automation". New York: Routledge. ISBN 978-1-138-52364-7. OCLC 1015814093.
- Rodriguez, Gregory (April 16, 2007). "The kindness of Kurt Vonnegut". Los Angeles Times.
- Sharp, Michael D. (2006). Popular Contemporary Writers. Vol. 10. Marshall Cavendish Reference. ISBN 978-0-7614-7601-6.
- Shields, Charles J. (2011). And So It Goes: Kurt Vonnegut, a Life. Henry Holt and Company. ISBN 978-0-8050-8693-5.
- Smith, Dinitia (April 13, 2007). "Kurt Vonnegut, Counterculture's Novelist, Dies". The New York Times.
- Strand, Ginger (2015). The Brothers Vonnegut: Science and Fiction in the House of Magic. Farrar, Straus and Giroux. ISBN 978-0-374-11701-6.
- Sumner, Gregory (2014). "Vonnegut, Kurt Jr". American National Biography Online.
- Tally, Robert T. Jr. (2011). Kurt Vonnegut and the American Novel: A Postmodern Iconography. Continuum Books. ISBN 978-1-4411-6445-2.
- Tally, Robert T. Jr. (2013). "On Kurt Vonnegut". In Tally, Robert T. Jr. (ed.). Kurt Vonnegut. Critical Insights. Salem Press. pp. 3–17. ISBN 978-1-4298-3848-1.
- Thomas, Peter L. (2006). Reading, Learning, Teaching Kurt Vonnegut. Peter Lang. ISBN 978-0-8204-6337-7.
- "Up to 25,000 died in Dresden's WWII bombing – report". BBC. March 18, 2010.
- Vitale, Tom (May 31, 2011). "Kurt Vonnegut: Still Speaking To The War Weary". NPR.
- Vonnegut, Kurt (January 21, 2006). "A Man Without A Country, "Custodians of chaos"". The Guardian.
- Vonnegut, Kurt (1999). God Bless You, Dr. Kevorkian. Seven Stories Press. ISBN 978-1-58322-020-7.
- Vonnegut, Kurt (June 28, 2008). "Kurt Vonnegut on His Time as a POW". Newsweek. Archived from the original on March 1, 2015.
- Vonnegut, Kurt (1982). Palm Sunday: An Autobiographical Collage. Dell Publishing. ISBN 978-0-440-57163-6.
- Vonnegut, Kurt (2009). Palm Sunday: An Autobiographical Collage. Random House Publishing. ISBN 978-0-307-56806-9.
- Vonnegut, Kurt (2006). Wampeters, Foma & Granfalloons. Dial Press. ISBN 978-0-385-33381-8.
- Wolff, Gregory (October 25, 1987). "A Wildly Improbable Gang of Nine". The New York Times.
- Zinn, Howard; Arnove, Anthony (2009). Voices of A People's History of the United States. Seven Stories Press. ISBN 978-1-58322-916-3.
