= A Man Without a Country =

2005 essay collection by Kurt Vonnegut

A Man Without a Country A Memoir of Life in George W. Bush's America
- First edition
- Author: Kurt Vonnegut
- Language: English
- Publisher: Seven Stories Press
- Publication date: September 15, 2005
- Publication place: United States
- Media type: Print
- ISBN: 1-58322-713-X
- OCLC: 60515164
- Dewey Decimal: 813/.54 B 22
- LC Class: PS3572.O5 Z473 2005

A Man Without a Country (subtitle: A Memoir of Life in George W. Bush's America) is an essay collection published in 2005 by the author Kurt Vonnegut. The essays deal with topics ranging from the importance of humor, to problems with modern technology, to Vonnegut's opinions on the differences between men and women. Many of the essays explicate Vonnegut's views about politics and the issues in modern American society, often from a humanistic perspective.

A Man Without a Country was a New York Times Bestseller and a Booksense Notable Book. In January 2007, Vonnegut indicated that he intended this to be his final work – a statement proved correct, with his death in April 2007. All of Vonnegut's later works were published posthumously and consisted almost entirely of previously unpublished material.

== Publication information ==
- Published by Bloomsbury in the UK, ISBN 0-7475-8406-0
