= The Sirens of Titan =

1959 novel by Kurt Vonnegut Jr.

- First edition cover
- Author: Kurt Vonnegut Jr.
- Language: English
- Genre: Science fiction, black comedy
- Publisher: Delacorte (hardcover), Dell (paperback)
- Publication date: 1959
- Publication place: United States
- Media type: Print (hardback & paperback)
- Pages: 319 (first edition)
- ISBN: 0340028769 (1967, Hodder & Stoughton)
- OCLC: 373570
- Dewey Decimal: 813/.54 22
- LC Class: PS3572.O5 S57 2006

The Sirens of Titan is a comic science fiction novel by Kurt Vonnegut Jr., first published in 1959. His second novel, it involves issues of free will, omniscience, and the overall purpose of human history, with much of the story revolving around a Martian invasion of Earth.

== Plot ==
This novel begins with an omniscient comment: "Everyone now knows how to find the meaning of life within himself. But mankind wasn't always so lucky."

Malachi Constant is the richest man in a future North America. He possesses extraordinary luck that he attributes to divine favor which he has used to build upon his father's fortune. He becomes the centerpoint of a journey that takes him from Earth to Mars in preparation for an interplanetary war, to Mercury with another Martian survivor of that war, back to Earth to be pilloried as a sign of Man's displeasure with his arrogance, and finally to Titan where he again meets the man ostensibly responsible for the turn of events that have befallen him, Winston Niles Rumfoord.

Rumfoord comes from a wealthy New England background. His private fortune was large enough to fund the construction of a personal spacecraft, and he became a space explorer. Traveling between Earth and Mars, his ship—carrying Rumfoord and his dog, Kazak—entered a phenomenon known as a chrono-synclastic infundibulum, which is defined in the novel as "those places ... where all the different kinds of truths fit together". When they enter the infundibulum, Rumfoord and Kazak become "wave phenomena", somewhat akin to the probability waves encountered in quantum mechanics. They exist along a spiral stretching from the Sun to the star Betelgeuse. When a planet, such as the Earth, intersects their spiral, Rumfoord and Kazak materialize, temporarily, on that planet.

When he entered the chrono-synclastic infundibulum, Rumfoord became aware of the past and future. Throughout the novel, he predicts events; unless he is deliberately lying, the predictions come true. It is in this state that Rumfoord established the "Church of God the Utterly Indifferent" on Earth to unite the planet after a Martian invasion. It is also in this state that Rumfoord, materializing on different planets, instigated the Martian invasion, which was designed to fail spectacularly. On Titan, the only place where he can exist permanently as a solid human being, Rumfoord befriends a traveller from Tralfamadore (a world that also figures in Vonnegut's novel Slaughterhouse-Five, among others) who needs a small metal component to repair his damaged spaceship.

Salo, the Tralfamadorian explorer, is a robot built millennia earlier to carry a message to a distant galaxy. His spacecraft is powered by the Universal Will to Become or UWTB, the "prime mover" which makes matter and organization wish to appear out of nothingness. (UWTB, Vonnegut informs the reader, was responsible for the Universe in the first place and is the greatest imaginable power source). A small component on Salo's spacecraft breaks and strands him here in the Solar System for over 200 millennia. He requests help from Tralfamadore, and his fellow Tralfamadorians respond by manipulating human history so that primitive humans evolve and create a civilization in order to produce the replacement part. Rumfoord's encounter with the chrono-synclastic infundibulum, the following war with Mars and Constant's exile to Titan were manipulated via the Tralfamadorians' control of the UWTB. Stonehenge, the Great Wall of China and the Kremlin are all messages in the Tralfamadorian geometrical language, informing Salo of their progress.

As it turns out, the replacement part is a small metal strip, brought to Salo by Constant and his son Chrono (born of Rumfoord's ex-wife). A sunspot disrupts Rumfoord's spiral, sending him and Kazak separately into the vastness of space. An argument between Rumfoord and Salo moments before concerning the contents of Salo's message, left unresolved because of Rumfoord's disappearance, leads the distraught Salo to disassemble himself, thereby stranding the humans on Titan. It is revealed that the message was a single dot, meaning "Greetings" in Tralfamadorian. Chrono chooses to live among the Titanian birds; after thirty-two years, his mother dies and Constant manages to reassemble Salo. Using the part delivered so many years previously by Chrono, Constant repairs the Tralfamadorian saucer. Salo wishes to place the aging Constant at a shuffleboard court, but Constant insists on being dropped off in Indianapolis, where he dies of exposure in the wintertime while awaiting an overdue city bus. As he passes away, he experiences a pleasant hallucination secretly implanted in his mind by a compassionate Salo.

== Major themes ==
The Sirens of Titan largely deals with questions of free will, with multiple characters being stripped of it and the revelation that humanity had been secretly manipulated for millennia for an inane purpose, playing major roles in the story. Free will and the lack thereof became major themes in Vonnegut's later novels, especially Slaughterhouse-Five (1969) and Breakfast of Champions (1972). More broadly speaking, lack of agency has been a hallmark of Vonnegut's novels, with the protagonists struggling against forces they can never overcome and often can't comprehend. None of the characters in The Sirens of Titan have chosen to be in their position, but are driven by forces and wills beside their own, and can do no more than try to make the best of it. At the end of the book Constant concludes, "A purpose of human life, no matter who is controlling it, is to love whoever is around to be loved."

== Style ==
The novel is simple in syntax and sentence structure, part of Vonnegut's signature style. Likewise, irony, sentimentality, black humor, and didacticism are prevalent throughout the novel.

== Background ==
According to The Harvard Crimson, Vonnegut "put together the whole of The Sirens of Titan ... in one night ... [H]e was at a party where someone told him he ought to write another novel. So they went into the next room where he just verbally pieced together this book from the things that were around in his mind."

== Reception ==
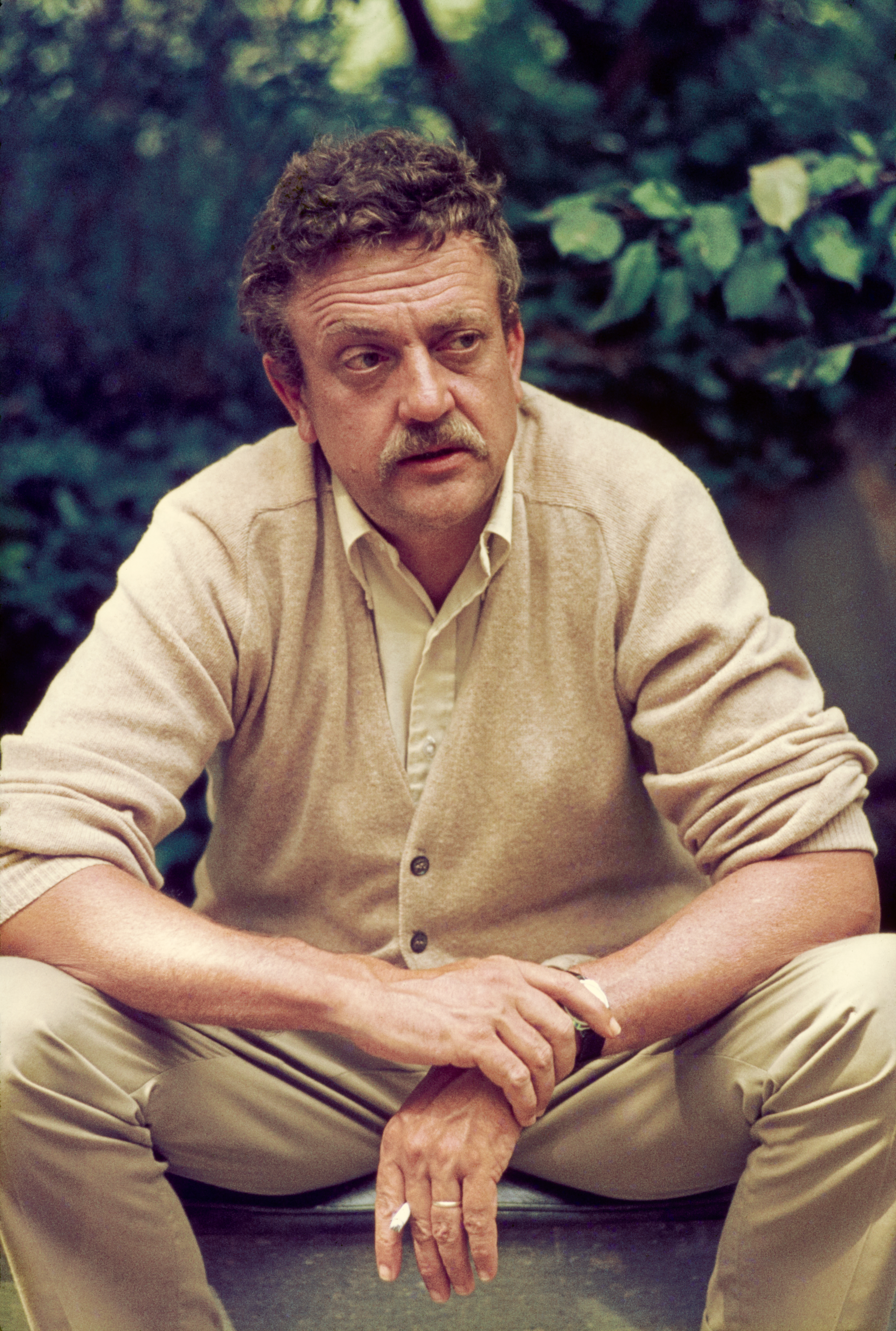
A 1965 photograph of Vonnegut by Bernard Gotfryd

Floyd C. Gale of Galaxy Science Fiction in 1961 rated The Sirens of Titan 4.5 stars out of five, stating that "The plot is tangled, intricate and tortuous" but "the book, though exasperating, is a joy of inventiveness". It was a finalist for the 1960 Hugo Award for Best Novel.

William Deresiewicz, in a 2012 retrospective published after a second Library of America collection of Vonnegut's work was released, wrote:

Artistically, though, [Player Piano] is apprentice work—clunky, clumsy, overstuffed. Turn the page to The Sirens of Titan (1959), however, and it's all there, all at once. Kurt Vonnegut has become Kurt Vonnegut. The spareness hits you first. The first page contains fourteen paragraphs, none of them longer than two sentences, some of them as short as five words. It's like he's placing pieces on a game board—so, and so, and so. The story moves from one intensely spotlit moment to the next, one idea to the next, without delay or filler. The prose is equally efficient, with a scalding syncopated wit: "'I told her that you and she were to be married on Mars.' He shrugged. 'Not married exactly—' he said, 'but bred by the Martians—like farm animals.'"

== Publishing history ==
In 2000 or early 2001, RosettaBooks, an independent e-book publisher, contracted with Vonnegut to publish e-book editions of several of his novels, including The Sirens of Titan. Random House sued RosettaBooks in February 2001, claiming (with respect to Vonnegut) that the contracts he signed with (predecessor-in-interest) Dell in 1967 and 1970 granted Random House e-book publishing rights as well. In July 2001, Judge Sidney H. Stein denied Random House's request for an injunction; in December 2002, Random House and Rosetta Books settled out-of-court, with RosettaBooks retaining the publishing rights that Random House had challenged.

In 2009, Audible.com produced an audio version of The Sirens of Titan, narrated by Jay Snyder, as part of its Modern Vanguard line of audiobooks.

== Adaptations ==
In the 1970s, the Organic Theatre Company presented Sirens, a stage adaptation of The Sirens of Titan, designed by James Maronek and directed by Stuart Gordon, the company's founder; it used "a simple set, a few pieces of furniture and a white backdrop curtain as a space-time warp". It was staged in October 1977 at the University of California, San Diego.

Gordon's adaptation was produced again 40 years later in 2017 at Los Angeles' Sacred Fools Theater Company, this time directed by film and theater director Ben Rock, with the adaptation newly updated by Gordon. Also, in the early 1970s, Central Michigan University (Mt. Pleasant, MI) staged a production of The Sirens of Titan under the direction of Professor Elbert Bowen, featuring Terry O'Quinn in the role of Malachi Constant.

Vonnegut sold the film rights to Sirens of Titan to Jerry Garcia, guitarist and vocalist for rock band The Grateful Dead. Garcia began working with Tom Davis in early December 1983 and finished their first draft in January 1985. Garcia commented on the book and the screenplay in a November 1987 interview:

There's really three basic characters that are having things happen to them. Three main characters. [Malachi,] Rumfoord, and Bee. It's like a triangle, a complex, convoluted love story. And it's really that simple... So our task has been to take the essential dramatic relationships, make it playable for actors, so that it's free from the Big Picture emphasis of the book. There's also some extremely lovely, touching moments in the book. It's one of the few Vonnegut books that's really sweet, in parts of it, and it has some really lovely stuff in it. It's the range of it that gets me off.

Garcia died in 1995 before bringing the film to the screen. After waiting a "respectable period of time", Robert B. Weide, who had written and produced the 1996 film adaptation of Mother Night and had been working on a Vonnegut documentary for years (it would after long last be released in 2021), asked the author about the status of the rights. Vonnegut bought back the rights from Garcia's estate and gave them to Weide on a "verbal handshake", where they remained for years while he attempted to write and find backers for his adaptation. By 2006, Weide reluctantly announced that he had lost the rights. In April 2007, it was announced that screenwriter James V. Hart wrote an adaptation, which Vonnegut approved before he died.

On July 19, 2017, it was announced that the novel would be adapted as a TV series and would be directed by Dan Harmon, who will be collaborating with Evan Katz on the project.

== Influence ==
In a 1979 interview released in 2007, Douglas Adams discussed Vonnegut as an influence on The Hitchhiker's Guide to the Galaxy:

Sirens of Titan is just one of those books – you read it through the first time and you think it's very loosely, casually written. You think the fact that everything suddenly makes such good sense at the end is almost accidental. And then you read it a few more times, simultaneously finding out more about writing yourself, and you realize what an absolute tour de force it was, making something as beautifully honed as that appear so casual.
