= Knox Burger =

Knox Breckenridge Burger (November 1, 1922 – January 4, 2010) was an editor, writer, and literary agent. He published Kurt Vonnegut's first short story and with his wife he founded Knox Burger & Associates, a literary agency.

== Early life ==
Burger was born in New York City and lived in early life in Westchester County. Carl Burger, his father, was an illustrator.

While serving in World War II, Burger contributed to Yank, the Army weekly 1943–1944. In a B-29 bomb squadron in the Marianas, Burger covered a number of missions over Japan, and was transferred to the Yank Saipan bureau late summer 1945 just before the Japanese surrender. Burger moved north to Tokyo, where he was, for a few months, the editor of the Far East edition of Yank, and wrote numerous stories about the occupation.

Burger, like his father, the author and illustrator Carl Burger, graduated from Cornell University.

== Career ==
After the war, Burger worked as the fiction editor of Collier's from 1948 to 1951, where in 1950 he accepted Kurt Vonnegut's first published short story, “Report on the Barnhouse Effect”. He then moved on to editing for Dell from 1951 to 1960 and Fawcett Publications in 1960, joining the latter's Gold Medal line, where he worked on the release of John D. MacDonald's first three Travis McGee novels. In 1970, in partnership with his wife Kitty Sprague he founded Knox Burger and Associates, a literary agency which in 2000 merged with the Harold Ober agency.

Burger worked with writers including Andrew Bergman, Max Allan Collins, John Wyndham, Kurt Vonnegut, John D. MacDonald, John Steinbeck, Ray Bradbury, Lawrence Block, Jack Finney, Horace McCoy, Walter Tevis, MacKinlay Kantor, Morris West, Donald McCaig, Donald Westlake, William Caunitz, Martin Cruz Smith, and Louis L'Amour. In 1980 he sold Cruz Smith's "Gorky Park" to Random House for $1 million.

In 2000, Knox Burger donated his archive to the Fales Library of New York University.
