= Timequake =

1997 semi-autobiographical work by Kurt Vonnegut, Jr.

- Cover of first edition (hardcover)
- Author: Kurt Vonnegut
- Language: English
- Genre: Semi-autobiographical novel; Fiction
- Publisher: Putnam Publishing Group
- Publication date: September 22, 1997
- Publication place: United States
- Media type: Print (Hardcover & Paperback)
- Pages: 219
- ISBN: 0-399-13737-8
- OCLC: 36824733
- Dewey Decimal: 813/.54 21
- LC Class: PS3572.O5 T56 1997

Timequake is a 1997 semi-autobiographical work by Kurt Vonnegut. Marketed as a novel, the book was described as a "stew" by Vonnegut, in which he summarizes a novel he had been struggling with for a number of years.

== Plot summary ==
Vonnegut uses the premise of a timequake (or repetition of actions) in which there is no free will. The idea of determinism is explored—as it is in many of his previous works—to assert that people really have no free will. Kilgore Trout serves again as the main character, who the author declares as having died in 2001, at the fictitious Xanadu retreat in Rhode Island. Vonnegut explains in the beginning of the book that he was not satisfied with the original version of Timequake he wrote (or Timequake One). Taking parts of Timequake One and combining it with personal thoughts and anecdotes produced the finished product, so-called Timequake Two. Many of the anecdotes deal with Vonnegut's family, the death of loved ones, and people's last words.

The plot, while centered on Trout, is also a sort of ramble in which Vonnegut relays tangents to the plot and comes back dozens of pages later: the timequake has thrust citizens of the year 2001 back in time to 1991 to repeat every action they undertook during that time.

Most of the small stories in the book expound on the depression and sadness wrought by watching oneself make bad choices: people watch their parents die again, drive drunk or cause accidents that severely injure others. At the end of the timequake, when people resume control, they are depressed and gripped by ennui. Kilgore Trout is the only one not affected by the apathy, and thus helps revive others by telling them, "You were sick, but now you're well, and there's work to do."

In the conclusion of this book, a fictionalized Vonnegut (who has inserted himself into the text, something he also did in Breakfast of Champions and, to a lesser degree, in Slaughterhouse-Five) meets other authors for a celebration of Trout. The celebration, described as a "clambake," is heavily foreshadowed throughout the novel's previous chapters.

== Style ==
The novel is divided into 63 chapters, seemingly arbitrarily. A new chapter rarely offers any sort of "break" with a previous one; in most cases a thought which was being discussed at the conclusion of the previous chapter continues uninterrupted in the next; chapter breaks are thus used no differently from paragraph breaks. Timequake, like many Vonnegut works, features a large number of double-spaced paragraph breaks and triple asterisks within each chapter, creating a constant sense of the author pausing between paragraphs.

Though his tone is largely cynical throughout Timequake, Vonnegut frequently makes use of various light-hearted sayings, such as "Hold on to your hats!" or "Get a load of this!" when segueing between ideas. Several phrases are likewise continually repeated, such as "ting-a-ling" and "he's up in heaven now."
