= Kurt Vonnegut bibliography =

- Novels↙: 14
- Articles↙: 81
- Stories↙: 123
- Collections↙: 16
- Poems↙: 1
- Plays↙: 7
- Interviews↙: 2
- Other works↙: 3

The bibliography of Kurt Vonnegut (1922–2007) includes essays, books and fiction, as well as film and television adaptations of works written by the Indianapolis-born author. Vonnegut began his literary career with science fiction short stories and novels, but abandoned the genre to focus on political writings and painting in his later life.

== Novels ==
Title	Date	Notes
Player Piano	August 1952	Published as Utopia 14 in 1954, published again as Player Piano in 1966
The Sirens of Titan	October 31, 1959	Nominated for a Hugo Award
Mother Night	1961	Adapted as a film in 1996
Cat's Cradle	April 1963	Nominated for a Hugo Award
God Bless You, Mr. Rosewater, or Pearls Before Swine, illustrated by Wayne Anderson in 1972	January 1965	Later adapted as a musical with book and lyrics by Howard Ashman and music by Alan Menken; additional lyrics by Dennis Green
Slaughterhouse-Five, or The Children's Crusade: A Duty-Dance with Death	March 1969	Nominated for Nebula and Hugo Awards, adapted as a film in 1972, adapted as a graphic novel in 2020
Breakfast of Champions, or Goodbye Blue Monday	July 1973	Adapted as a film in 1999
Slapstick, or Lonesome No More!	October 1976	Adapted as a film in 1984
Jailbird	September 1979	
Deadeye Dick	October 1982	
Galápagos	October 1985	
Bluebeard, the Autobiography of Rabo Karabekian (1916–1988)	October 1987	
Hocus Pocus	September 1990	
Timequake	September 22, 1997	

== Collections ==
Title	Date	Notes
Canary in a Cat House	September 1961	Short stories
Welcome to the Monkey House	August 1968	Short stories; contains all but one story from Canary in a Cathouse
Wampeters, Foma and Granfalloons (Opinions)	1974	Essays and assorted works
Palm Sunday: An Autobiographical Collage	1981	Short stories, essays, and assorted works
Nothing Is Lost Save Honor: Two Essays	December 1984	Limited edition of two essays
Fates Worse Than Death: An Autobiographical Collage	September 5, 1991	Essays and assorted works
Bagombo Snuff Box: Uncollected Short Fiction	August 1999	Short stories
God Bless You, Dr. Kevorkian	October 1999	Fictional interviews originally presented as radio monologues
A Man Without a Country	September 15, 2005	Essays
Armageddon in Retrospect and Other New and Unpublished Writings on War and Peace	April 1, 2008	Short stories and essays
Look at the Birdie: Unpublished Short Fiction	October 20, 2009	Short stories
While Mortals Sleep: Unpublished Short Fiction	January 25, 2011	Short stories
Kurt Vonnegut: The Cornell Sun Years 1941–1943	April 23, 2012	Collection of his writings as editor of his college newspaper; available as Amazon eBook
We Are What We Pretend to Be: The First and Last Works	October 9, 2012	Collection of two previously unpublished novellas
Sucker's Portfolio: A Collection of Previously Unpublished Writing	March 12, 2013	A collection of previously unpublished works
If This Isn't Nice, What Is?: Advice to the Young	April 30, 2013	Commencement speeches

== Plays ==
Title	Date	Notes
Penelope	1960	Later revised as Happy Birthday, Wanda June and reprinted in 1970. Adapted as a film in 1971
The Very First Christmas Morning	December 14, 1962	Published in Better Homes and Gardens
Fortitude	September 1968	One act, published in Playboy; collected in Human-Machines: An Anthology of Stories About Cyborgs, New York: Vintage, 1975. Adapted in episode five of the television series Kurt Vonnegut's Monkey House
Happy Birthday, Wanda June	1971	
Requiem	1987	With music by Edgar David Grana
Make Up Your Mind	1993	
Miss Temptation	1993	Adapted by David Cooperman
L'Histoire du Soldat	1993	A reworked libretto that Vonnegut made into a tale about World War II Private Eddie Slovik, the first soldier in the United States military to be executed for desertion since the Civil War.

== Short stories ==
Title	Date	Notes
"2 B R 0 2 B"	January 1962	Published in Worlds of If, collected in Bagombo Snuff Box
"$10,000 a Year, Easy"	January 25, 2011	Published in While Mortals Sleep
"Adam"	April 1954	Published in Cosmopolitan, collected in Welcome to the Monkey House
"All the King's Horses"	February 10, 1951	Published in Collier's Weekly, collected in Canary in a Cat House and Welcome to the Monkey House, adapted in episode three of the television series Kurt Vonnegut's Monkey House
"Ambitious Sophomore"	May 1, 1954	Published in The Saturday Evening Post, collected in Bagombo Snuff Box
"And on Your Left"	September 26, 2017	Published in Complete Stories
"Any Reasonable Offer"	January 19, 1952	Published in Collier's Weekly, collected in Bagombo Snuff Box
"Armageddon in Retrospect"	April 1, 2008	Published in Armageddon in Retrospect
"Atrocity Story"	September 26, 2017	Published in Complete Stories
"Bagombo Snuff Box"	October 1954	Published in Cosmopolitan, collected in Bagombo Snuff Box
"Basic Training"	March 22, 2012	Published as a Kindle Single by Rosetta Books, originally written in the 1940s and submitted to McCalls and The Saturday Evening Post
"The Big Space Fuck"	May 1972	Published in Again, Dangerous Visions, collected in Palm Sunday
"The Big Trip Up Yonder"	January 1954	Published in Galaxy Science Fiction, collected in Canary in a Cat House and Welcome to the Monkey House with the title "Tomorrow and Tomorrow and Tomorrow"
"Bomar"	January 25, 2011	Published in While Mortals Sleep
"The Boy Who Hated Girls"	March 31, 1956	Published in The Saturday Evening Post, collected in Bagombo Snuff Box
"Brighten Up"	April 1, 2008	Published in Armageddon in Retrospect
"City"	September 26, 2017	Published in Complete Stories
"The Commandant's Desk"	April 1, 2008	Published in Armageddon in Retrospect
"Confido"	October 20, 2009	Published in Look at the Birdie
"The Cruise of Jolly Roger"	April 1953	Published in Cape Cod Compass, collected in Bagombo Snuff Box
"Custom-Made Bride"	March 27, 1954	Published in The Saturday Evening Post, collected in Bagombo Snuff Box
"D.P."	August 1953	Published in Ladies Home Journal, collected in Canary in a Cat House and Welcome to the Monkey House, adapted as the television film Displaced Person
"Deer in the Works"	April 1955	Published in Esquire, collected in Canary in a Cat House and Welcome to the Monkey House
"The Drone King"	September 26, 2017	Published in Complete Stories
"Ed Luby's Key Club"	October 20, 2009	Published in Look at the Birdie
"EPICAC"	November 25, 1950	Published in Collier's Magazine, revised and collected in Welcome to the Monkey House, adapted in episode four of the television series Kurt Vonnegut's Monkey House
"The Epizootic"	January 25, 2011	Published in While Mortals Sleep
"The Euphio Question"	May 12, 1951	Published in Collier's Weekly, collected in Canary in a Cat House and Welcome to the Monkey House, adapted in episode two of the television series Kurt Vonnegut's Monkey House
"F U B A R"	October 20, 2009	Published in Look at the Birdie
"Find Me a Dream"	February 1961	Published in Cosmopolitan, collected in Bagombo Snuff Box
"The Foster Portfolio"	September 8, 1951	Published in Collier's Magazine, collected in Canary in a Cat House and Welcome to the Monkey House, adapted in episode seven of the television series Kurt Vonnegut's Monkey House
"Girl Pool"	January 25, 2011	Published in While Mortals Sleep
"Go Back to Your Precious Wife and Son"	July 1962	Published in Ladies Home Journal, collected in Welcome to the Monkey House
"The Good Explainer"	October 20, 2009	Published in Look at the Birdie
"Great Day"	April 1, 2008	Published in Armageddon in Retrospect
"Guns Before Butter"	April 1, 2008	Published in Armageddon in Retrospect
"The Guardian of the Person"	January 25, 2011	Published in While Mortals Sleep
"Hal Irwin's Magic Lamp"	June 1957	Collected in Canary in a Cat House, revised and published again in Bagombo Snuff Box
"Hall of Mirrors"	October 20, 2009	Published in Look at the Birdie
"Happy Birthday, 1951"	April 1, 2008	Published in Armageddon in Retrospect
"Harrison Bergeron"	October 5, 1961	Published in The Magazine of Fantasy and Science Fiction, collected in Welcome to the Monkey House, adapted as a television film in 1995; a short film in 2006; and a second short film entitled 2081 in 2009
"Hello, Red"	October 20, 2009	Published in Look at the Birdie
"Hole Beautiful: Prospectus for a Magazine of Shelteredness"	January 1962	Published in Monocle, with Karla Kuskin
"The Honor of a Newsboy"	October 20, 2009	Published in Look at the Birdie
"The Humbugs"	January 25, 2011	Published in While Mortals Sleep
"Hundred-Dollar Kisses"	January 25, 2011	Published in While Mortals Sleep
"The Hyannis Port Story"	1968	Collected in Welcome to the Monkey House, originally intended for publication in The Saturday Evening Post in 1963, but canceled after the John F. Kennedy assassination
"Jenny"	January 25, 2011	Published in While Mortals Sleep
"Just You and Me, Sammy"	April 1, 2008	Published in Armageddon in Retrospect
"The Kid Nobody Could Handle"	September 24, 1955	Published in The Saturday Evening Post, collected in Welcome to the Monkey House
"King and Queen of the Universe"	October 20, 2009	Published in Look at the Birdie
"The Lie"	February 24, 1962	Published in The Saturday Evening Post, collected in Welcome to the Monkey House
"Little Drops of Water"	June 2009	"Little drops of water". Harper's Magazine. Vol. 318, no. 1909. June 2009. p. 64. Reprinted in Look at the Birdie.
"Long Walk to Forever"	August 1960	Published in Ladies Home Journal, collected in Welcome to the Monkey House
"Look at the Birdie"	October 20, 2009	Published in Look at the Birdie
"Lovers Anonymous"	October 1963	Published in Redbook, collected in Bagombo Snuff Box
"The Man Without No Kiddleys"	January 25, 2011	Published in While Mortals Sleep
"The Manned Missiles"	July 1958	Published in Cosmopolitan, collected in Canary in a Cat House and Welcome to the Monkey House
"Merlin"	1997	Serialized on bottles of Denver Public Libation Ale, made by Wynkoop Brewing Company
"Miss Temptation"	April 21, 1956	Published in The Saturday Evening Post, collected in Welcome to the Monkey House
"Mnemonics"	April 28, 1951	Published in Collier's Weekly, collected in Bagombo Snuff Box
"Money Talks"	January 25, 2011	Published in While Mortals Sleep
"More Stately Mansions"	December 22, 1951	Published in Collier's Weekly, collected in Canary in a Cat House and Welcome to the Monkey House, adapted in episode six of the television series Kurt Vonnegut's Monkey House
"Mr. Z"	January 25, 2011	Published in While Mortals Sleep
"My Name Is Everyone"	December 16, 1961	Published in The Saturday Evening Post, collected in Welcome to the Monkey House as "Who Am I This Time?", adapted as a film in 1983 and a radio drama in 2008
"Next Door"	April 1955	Published in Cosmopolitan, adapted in 1975 for a short film titled Next Door, and, in 1991, adapted in the first episode of the television series Kurt Vonnegut's Monkey House
"The Nice Little People"	October 20, 2009	Published in Look at the Birdie
"A Night for Love"	November 23, 1957	Published in The Saturday Evening Post, collected in Bagombo Snuff Box
"The No-Talent Kid"	October 25, 1952	Published in The Saturday Evening Post, collected in Bagombo Snuff Box
"Out, Brief Candle"	January 25, 2011	Published in While Mortals Sleep
"The Package"	July 26, 1952	Published in Collier's Weekly, collected in Bagombo Snuff Box
"The Petrified Ants"	October 20, 2009	Published in Look at the Birdie
"Poor Little Rich Town"	October 25, 1952	Published in Collier's Weekly, collected in Bagombo Snuff Box
"The Powder-Blue Dragon"	November 1954	Published in Cosmopolitan, revised and collected in Bagombo Snuff Box
"A Present for Big Nick"	December 1954	Published in Argosy, collected in Bagombo Snuff Box with the title "A Present for Big Saint Nick"
"Report on the Barnhouse Effect"	February 11, 1950	Published in Collier's Weekly, collected in Canary in a Cat House and Welcome to the Monkey House
"Requiem for Zeitgeist"	September 26, 2017	Published in Complete Stories
"Runaways"	April 15, 1961	Published in The Saturday Evening Post, collected in Bagombo Snuff Box
"Ruth"	January 25, 2011	Published in While Mortals Sleep
"Shout About It from the Housetops"	October 20, 2009	Published in Look at the Birdie
"Sinbad"	July 18, 2016	Published individually as an audiobook
"A Song for Selma"	October 20, 2009	Published in Look at the Birdie
"Souvenir"	December 1952	Published in Argosy, collected in Bagombo Snuff Box
"Spoils"	April 1, 2008	Published in Armageddon in Retrospect
"Tango"	January 25, 2011	Published in While Mortals Sleep
"Thanasphere"	September 2, 1950	Published in Collier's Weekly, collected in Bagombo Snuff Box
"This Son of Mine..."	August 18, 1956	Published in The Saturday Evening Post, collected in Bagombo Snuff Box
"Tom Edison's Shaggy Dog"	March 14, 1953	Collected in Canary in a Cat House and Welcome to the Monkey House
"The Unicorn Trap"	April 1, 2008	Published in Armageddon in Retrospect
"Unknown Soldier"	April 1, 2008	Published in Armageddon in Retrospect
"Unpaid Consultant"	March 1955	Published in Cosmopolitan, collected in Bagombo Snuff Box
"Unready to Wear"	April 1953	Published in Galaxy Science Fiction, collected in Canary in a Cat House and Welcome to the Monkey House
"Wailing Shall Be in All Streets"	April 1, 2008	Published in Armageddon in Retrospect
"Welcome to the Monkey House"	January 1968	Published in Playboy, collected in Welcome to the Monkey House
"While Mortals Sleep"	January 25, 2011	Published in While Mortals Sleep
"With His Hand on the Throttle"	January 25, 2011	Published in While Mortals Sleep

== Articles ==
Title	Date	Notes
About This Play	1975	Introduction to Happy Birthday, Wanda June
Address to P.E.N. Conference in Stockholm, 1973	1973	Published in Wampeters, Foma and Granfalloons
"As a Kid I Was the Youngest"		Published in Man Without a Country
"America: Right and Wrong"	September 12, 1992	Published in The Montreal Gazette
"American Christmas Card 2004"	December 23, 2004	Published in In These Times
"Der Arme Dolmetscher" (English: "The Poor Interpreters")	July 1955	Published in The Atlantic Monthly, collected in Bagombo Snuff Box
Author's Note to Bluebeard	October 1987	
Author's Note to Man Without a Country	September 22, 2005	
"Avoiding the Big Bang"	June 13, 1982	Published in The New York Times
"Bernard Vonnegut: The Rainmaker"	January 4, 1998	Obituary for his brother, published in The New York Times
"The Best of Bob and Ray"		Book introduction published in Palm Sunday
"Biafra: A People Betrayed"	1970	Published in Wampeters, Foma and Granfalloons
"Brief Encounters on the Island Waterway"	1966	Published in Wampeters, Foma and Granfalloons
"...But Words Can Never Hurt Me"	1973	Address at Rededication of Whaton College Library, 1973 published in Wampeters, Foma and Granfalloons
"Can Great Books Make Good Movies? 7 Writers Just Say No!"	1987	Published in American Film
"The Chemistry Professor"		Treatment for a musical comedy based on Strange Case of Dr Jekyll and Mr Hyde, published in Palm Sunday
"Coda to My Career as a Writer for Periodicals"	August 1999	Published in Bagombo Snuff Box
"Cold Turkey"	May 10, 2004	Published in In These Times
"Dear Felix"		Letter published in Palm Sunday
"Dear Mr. McCarthy"		Letter published in Palm Sunday, book excerpt published in The New York Times on February 7, 1982 as "Books into Ashes"
"Dear Mr. Vonnegut"	February 28, 2003	Published in In These Times
"Dear Mr. Vonnegut"	March 24, 2003	Published in In These Times
"Dear Mr. Vonnegut"	April 14, 2003	Published in In These Times
"Do Unto Others"		Published in Man Without a Country
"Do You Know What a Humanist Is?"		Published in Man Without a Country
"Do You Know What a Twerp Is?"		Published in Man Without a Country
"Don't Take It Too Seriously"	March 20, 1966	Review of Prize Stories 1966: The O. Henry Awards, edited by Richard Poirier and William Abrahams, published in The New York Times Book Review
"A Dream of the Future (Not Excluding Lobsters)"	August 1985	Published in Esquire
"Dresden Revisited"		Introduction to an edition of Slaughterhouse-Five, published in Palm Sunday
"The End Is Near"	October 29, 2004	Published in In These Times
"Everything Goes Like Clockwork"	June 13, 1965	Review of Once a Greek... by Friedrich Dürrenmatt, published in The New York Times Book Review
"Excelsior! We're Going to the Moon! Excelsior!"	1969	Published in Wampeters, Foma and Granfalloons
"The Fall of a Climber"	September 25, 1966	Review of Any God Will Do by Richard Condon, published in The New York Times Book Review
"False Advertising"	March 24, 2004	Published in In These Times
"Fates Worse Than Death"	December 1984	Lecture at St. John the Divine, New York City, May 23, 1982, published in Nothing Is Lost Save Honor
"Fear and Loathing in Morristown, NJ"		Speech published in Palm Sunday
Foreword to A Saucer of Loneliness	October 10, 2000	Published in A Saucer of Loneliness, Volume VII: The Complete Stories of Theodore Sturgeon
Foreword to At Millennium's End: New Essays on the Work of Kurt Vonnegut	April 2001	
Foreword to Player Piano	1952	
Foreword to The Vonnegut Encyclopedia: An Authorized Compendium	1996	
"God's Law"		Speech published in Palm Sunday
"Good Missiles, Good Manners, Good Night"	1969	Published in Wampeters, Foma and Granfalloons
"Have I Got a Car for You!"	November 24, 2004	Published in In These Times
"He Leadeth Us from Porn: God Bless You, Edwin Meese"	1986	Published in The Nation
"Hello, Star Vega"	1965	Published in Wampeters, Foma and Granfalloons
"Here Is a Lesson in Creative Writing"		Published in Man Without a Country
"How Jokes Work"		Commencement address published in Palm Sunday
"How to Write with Style"		Essay published in Palm Sunday
"Headshrinker's Hoyle on Games We Play"	June 11, 1965	Review of Games People Play by Eric Berne, published in Life
"I Am Embarrassed"		Speech published in Palm Sunday
"I Have Been Called a Luddite"		Published in Man Without a Country
"I Love You, Madame Librarian"	August 6, 2004	Published in In These Times
"I Turned Eighty-Two on November 11"		Published in Man Without a Country
"I Used to Be the Owner and Manager of an Automobile Dealership"		Published in Man Without a Country
"I'm Going to Tell You Some News"		Published in Man Without a Country
"In a Manner That Must Shame God Himself"	1972	Published in Wampeters, Foma and Granfalloons
"Infarcted! Tabescent!"	June 27, 1965	Review of The Kandy-Kolored Tangerine-Flake Streamline Baby by Tom Wolfe, published in The New York Times Book Review
Introduction to Bagombo Snuff Box	August 1999	
Introduction to Palm Sunday	1981	
Introduction to The Demolished Man by Alfred Bester	1986	Edition published by The Easton Press
Introduction to The Sirens of Titan	1990	Edition published by The Easton Press
"Invite Rita Rait to America!"	1973	Published in Wampeters, Foma and Granfalloons
"James T. Farrell"		Funerary speech published in Palm Sunday
"Jonathan Swift"		Rejected introduction to an edition of Swift's Gulliver's Travels, published in Palm Sunday
"Knowing What's Nice"	November 6, 2003	Published in In These Times
Kurt Vonnegut at Clowes Hall, Indianapolis, April 27, 2007	April 27, 2007	Speech, published in Armageddon in Retrospect
"Last Words for a Century"	January 1999	Published in Playboy
"The Latest Word"	October 30, 1966	Review of The Random House Dictionary, published in The New York Times Book Review, collected in Wampeters, Foma and Granfaloons as "New Dictionary"
"Lavina Lyon"		Funerary speech published in Palm Sunday
Letter	November 1975	Letter published in Science Fiction Review
Letter from Kurt Vonnegut, Jr., to Walter Miller, 1951	1951	Letter published in Look at the Birdie
Letter from PFC Kurt Vonnegut, Jr., to His Family, May 29, 1945	May 29, 1945	Published in Armageddon in Retrospect
Letter to Ute Helena Bertram von Nimcz	first version 1989, revised version 2009	Letter published in Die Rolle des Religiösen in den Romanen von Kurt Vonnegut (English: The Role of Religion in the Novels of Kurt Vonnegut, ISBN 3-89406-106-5 / ISBN 978-3-00-027565-4) by Helena Bertram Countess von Nimcz zu Caldaha M.A.
Letter: Vonnegut on Trout	April 1975	Published in The Magazine of Fantasy and Science Fiction
"Louis-Ferdinand Céline"		Introduction to a paperback compilation of Céline's final three novels, published in Palm Sunday
"Mark Twain"		Speech published in Palm Sunday
"Money Talks to the New Man"	October 2, 1966	Review of The Boss by Goffredo Parise, published in The New York Times Book Review
"The Mysterious Madame Blavatsky"	1970	Published in Wampeters, Foma and Granfalloons
"The Noodle Factory"		Speech published in Palm Sunday
"Now Then, I Have Some Good News"		Published in Man Without a Country
"Okay, Now Let's Have Some Fun"		Published in Man Without a Country
"Old Fashioned Gadgets"	November 30, 1998	Published in Forbes
"One Hell of a Country"	February 21, 1992	Published in The Guardian
"Oversexed in Indianapolis"	1970	Published in Wampeters, Foma and Granfalloons
"Palm Sunday"		Sermon published in Palm Sunday
"Physicist, Purge Thyself"	1969	Address to the American Physical Society, published in Wampeters, Foma and Granfalloons
Playboy interview		Published in Wampeters, Foma and Granfalloons
"A Political Disease"	1973	Published in Wampeters, Foma and Granfalloons
Preface to Dead-Eye Dick	October 1982	
Preface to Fates Worse Than Death	September 5, 1991	
Preface to Wampeters, Foma and Granfalloons	1974	
Preface to Welcome to the Monkey House	August 1968	
Prologue to Jailbird	September 1979	
Prologue to Timequake	September 22, 1997	
"Reflections on My Own Death"	1971	Published in Wampeters, Foma and Granfalloons
"Requiem"		Published in Man Without a Country
"Requiem: The Hocus Pocus Laundromat"	1986	Published in North American Review
"Requiem for a Dreamer"	October 5, 2004	Published in In These Times
"The Rocky Graziano of American Letters"		Speech published in Palm Sunday
"A Sappy Woman from Ypsilanti"		Published in Man Without a Country
"Science Fiction"	September 5, 1965	Published in The New York Times Book Review, collected in Wampeters, Foma and Granfalloons
"Second Thoughts on Teacher's Scrapbook"	September 3, 1965	Review of Up the Down Staircase by Bel Kaufman, published in Life
Self-interview		Published in The Paris Review, collected in Palm Sunday
Something Happened by Joseph Heller		Book review published in Palm Sunday
"State of the Asylum"	February 5, 2004	Published in In These Times
"Strange Weather Lately"	May 9, 2003	Published in In These Times
"Susan Sontag and Arthur Miller"	March 3, 2005	Published in In These Times
"Teaching the Unteachable"	1967	Published in Wampeters, Foma and Granfalloons
"There's a Maniac on the Loose Out There"	1969	Published in Wampeters, Foma and Granfalloons
"Thinking Unthinkable, Speaking Unspeakable"	1973	Published in Wampeters, Foma and Granfalloons
"Thoughts of a Free Thinker"		Commencement address published in Palm Sunday
"Torture and Blubber"	1971	Published in Wampeters, Foma and Granfalloons
"Un-American Nonsense"		Essay published in Palm Sunday
"The Unsaid Says Much"	September 12, 1965	Review of Absent Without Leave by Heinrich Böll, published in The New York Times Book Review
"Up Is Better Than Down"	1970	Address to the Graduating Class at Bennington College, 1970 published in Wampeters, Foma and Granfalloons
"What I Like About Cornell"		Speech published in Palm Sunday
"What Women Really Want Is..."	1972	Address to the National Institute of Arts and Letters, 1971 published in Wampeters, Foma and Granfalloons
"When I Lost My Innocence"		Essay published in Palm Sunday
"Who in America Is Truly Happy?"		Essay published in Palm Sunday
"Why My Dog Is Not a Humanist"	1992	Published in The Humanist
"Why They Read Hesse"	1970	Published in Wampeters, Foma and Granfalloons
"Why We Need Libraries"	1994	Published in Utne Reader
"William Ellery Channing"		Speech published in Palm Sunday
"The Work to Be Done"	May 28, 1998	Published in Rolling Stone
"The Worst Addiction of Them All"	1984	Published in Nothing Is Lost Save Honor
"Yes, We Have No Nirvanas"	1968	Published in Wampeters, Foma and Granfalloons
"You've Never Been to Barnstable?"	October 1964	Published in Venture-Traveler's World, collected in Welcome to the Monkey House with the title "Where I Live"
"Your Guess Is as Good as Mine"	December 12, 2005	Published in In These Times

== Interviews ==
Title	Date	Notes
Like Shaking Hands with God: A Conversation About Writing	1999	A conversation between Kurt Vonnegut and Lee Stringer, moderated by Ross Klavan
"Kurt Vonnegut Vs. the !&#*!@"	January 27, 2003	Interview with Joel Bleifuss published in In These Times

== Other works ==
Title	Date	Notes
"Carols for Christmas 1969: Tonight If I Will Let Me"	December 21, 1969	Poem published in The New York Times Magazine
Between Time and Timbuktu or, Prometheus-5: A Space Fantasy	October 1972	Written for the National Educational Television Network and based on materials by Kurt Vonnegut, Jr.
Sun Moon Star	September 1980	Children's book illustrated by Ivan Chermayeff
Pity the Reader: On Writing with Style	November 5, 2019	A guide to writing, a posthumous collaboration written and edited by Suzanne McConnell

== Library of America Collection ==
Title	Date	Notes
Novels & Stories 1950–1962	April 26, 2012	Player Piano - The Sirens of Titan - Mother Night - Stories (Report on the Barnhouse Effect - EPICAC - Unready to Wear - Tomorrow and Tomorrow and Tomorrow - Harrison Bergeron - 2BR02B) - Appendix (Science Fiction - Introduction to "Bagombo Snuff Box"), ed. Sidney Offit
Novels & Stories 1963–1973	June 2, 2011	Cat's Cradle - God Bless You, Mr. Rosewater - Slaughterhouse-Five - Breakfast of Champions - Stories (Welcome to the Monkey House - Fortitude - The Big Space Fuck) - Appendix (Address to the American Physical Society, New York City, February 5, 1969 - Letter from PFC Kurt Vonnegut, Jr., to his family, May 29, 1945 - Wailing Shall Be in All Streets - A Special Message to readers of the Franklin Library's limited edition of "Slaughterhouse-Five" - Preface to the twenty-fifth-anniversary edition of "Slaughterhouse-Five"), ed. Sidney Offit
Novels 1976-1985	May 1, 2014	Slapstick - Jailbird - Deadeye Dick - Galápagos - Appendix (A Special Message to readers of the Franklin Library's signed first edition of "Slapstick" - Address to the American Psychiatric Association, Philadelphia, October 5, 1988 - A Special Message to readers of the Franklin Library's signed first edition of "Jailbird" - Four excerpts from "Fates Worse Than Death: An Autobiographical Collage of 1980s" - Lecture at the Cathedral of St. John the Divine, New York, May 23, 1982 - A Special Message to readers of the Franklin Library's signed first edition of "Galápagos"), ed. Sidney Offit
Novels 1987-1997	January 19, 2016	Bluebeard - Hocus Pocus - Timequake - Appendix (A Special Message to readers of the Franklin Library's signed first edition of "Bluebeard" - Four essays on artists - Origami Express: Author's note on the illustrations for "A Man Without a Country," by Kurt Vonnegut - A Special Message to readers of the Franklin Library's signed first edition of "Hocus Pocus" - The Last Tasmanian - Talk prepared for delivery at Clowes Memorial Hall, Butler University, Indianapolis, April 27, 2007), ed. Sidney Offit

== Film and television adaptations ==
Title	Date	Notes
Happy Birthday, Wanda June	1971	Feature film for which Vonnegut also wrote the screenplay
Slaughterhouse-Five	1972	Feature film
Between Time and Timbuktu	1972	Film adaptation for which Vonnegut served as advisor and contributor
Next Door	1975	Feature film
Who Am I This Time?	1982	Episode of PBS' American Playhouse series
Slapstick of Another Kind	1984	Feature film
Displaced Person	1985	Episode of the American anthology television series American Playhouse
Kurt Vonnegut's Monkey House	1991-1993	Canadian television anthology series. Vonnegut hosted the series himself
Harrison Bergeron	1995	Television movie
Mother Night	1995	Feature film
Breakfast of Champions	1999	Feature film
2081	2009	Short film based on Vonnegut's short story Harrison Bergeron
2BR02B: To Be or Naught to Be	2016	Short film
