= Complete Stories (Vonnegut) =

2017 collection of Kurt Vonnegut's short stories

- Editors: Jerome Klinkowitz, Dan Wakefield
- Author: Kurt Vonnegut
- Cover artist: Stewart Cauley Design
- Language: English
- Genre: Short fiction
- Publisher: Seven Stories Press
- Publication date: September 26, 2017
- Publication place: United States
- Media type: Print, E-book
- Pages: 1024
- ISBN: 9781609808082

Complete Stories is a 2017 collection of most of Kurt Vonnegut's previously published short stories, and several that were previously unpublished. The collection is introduced with a foreword by Dave Eggers, and is edited by Jerome Klinkowitz and Dan Wakefield.

This collection features 98 short stories:

- all from Bagombo Snuff Box (23), Look at the Birdie (14), and While Mortals Sleep (16)
- 23/25 from Welcome to the Monkey House (except "Where I Live" and "New Dictionary", both of which are non-fiction pieces rather than stories)
- 10/11 from Armageddon in Retrospect (except "Wailing Shall Be in All Streets", a non-fiction essay)
- 6/8 from Sucker's Portfolio (except "The Last Tasmanian" and "Robotville and Mr. Caslow", one of which is an unfinished story fragment, the other a non-fiction piece)
- 1 from Palm Sunday (only "The Big Space Fuck")
- 5 never-before-published stories ("Atrocity Story," "City," "The Drone King," "Requiem for Zeitgeist," and "And on Your Left")

== Contents ==
=== Part 1: War ===
- All the King's Horses (Collier's Magazine, February 10, 1951; also in a collection Welcome to the Monkey House, 1968)
- D.P. (Ladies Home Journal, August 1953; also in a collection Welcome to the Monkey House, 1968)
- The Manned Missiles (Cosmopolitan, July 1958; also in a collection Welcome to the Monkey House, 1968)
- Thanasphere (Collier's Magazine, September 2, 1950; also in a collection Bagombo Snuff Box, 1999)
- Souvenir (Argosy Magazine, December 1952; also in a collection Bagombo Snuff Box, 1999)
- The Cruise of the Jolly Roger (Cape Cod Compass, April 1953; also in a collection Bagombo Snuff Box, 1999)
- Der Arme Dolmetscher (The Atlantic Monthly, July 1955; also in a collection Bagombo Snuff Box, 1999)
- Bagombo Snuff Box (Cosmopolitan Magazine, October 1954; also in a collection Bagombo Snuff Box, 1999)
- Great Day (Armageddon in Retrospect, 2008)
- Guns Before Butter (Armageddon in Retrospect, 2008)
- Happy Birthday 1951 (Armageddon in Retrospect, 2008)
- Brighten Up (Armageddon in Retrospect, 2008)
- The Unicorn Trap (Armageddon in Retrospect, 2008)
- Spoils (Armageddon in Retrospect, 2008)
- Just You and Me, Sammy (Armageddon in Retrospect, 2008)
- The Commandant's Desk (Armageddon in Retrospect, 2008)
- Armageddon in Retrospect (Armageddon in Retrospect, 2008)
- The Petrified Ants (Look at the Birdie, 2009)
- Atrocity Story (never-before-published)

=== Part 2: Women ===
- Miss Temptation (The Saturday Evening Post, April 21, 1956; also in a collection Welcome to the Monkey House, 1968)
- Little Drops of Water (Look at the Birdie, 2009)
- Jenny (While Mortals Sleep, 2011)
- The Epizootic (While Mortals Sleep, 2011)
- Hundred-Dollar Kisses (While Mortals Sleep, 2011)
- Ruth (While Mortals Sleep, 2011)
- Out, Brief Candle (While Mortals Sleep, 2011)
- Mr. Z (While Mortals Sleep, 2011)
- With His Hand on the Throttle (While Mortals Sleep, 2011)
- Eden by the River (Sucker's Portfolio, 2013)
- Lovers Anonymous (Redbook Magazine, October 1963; also in a collection Bagombo Snuff Box, 1999)

=== Part 3: Science ===
- Next Door (Cosmopolitan Magazine, April 1955; also in a collection Welcome to the Monkey House, 1968)
- Report on the Barnhouse Effect (Collier's Magazine, February 11, 1950; also in a collection Welcome to the Monkey House, 1968)
- The Euphio Question (Collier's Magazine, May 12, 1951; also in a collection Welcome to the Monkey House, 1968)
- Unready to Wear (Galaxy Science Fiction Magazine, April 1953; also in a collection Welcome to the Monkey House, 1968)
- EPICAC (Collier's Magazine, November 26, 1950; also in a collection Welcome to the Monkey House, 1968)
- Mnemonics (Collier's Magazine, April 28, 1951; also in a collection Bagombo Snuff Box, 1999)
- Confido (Look at the Birdie, 2009)
- Hall of Mirrors (Look at the Birdie, 2009)
- The Nice Little People (Look at the Birdie, 2009)
- Look at the Birdie (Look at the Birdie, 2009)
- Between Time and Timbuktu (Sucker's Portfolio, 2013)

=== Part 4: Romance ===
- Who Am I This Time? (The Saturday Evening Post, December 16, 1961; also in a collection Welcome to the Monkey House, 1968)
- Long Walk to Forever (Ladies Home Journal, August 1960; also in a collection Welcome to the Monkey House, 1968)
- A Night for Love (The Saturday Evening Post, November 23, 1957; also in a collection Bagombo Snuff Box, 1999)
- Find Me a Dream (Cosmopolitan Magazine, February 1961; also in a collection Bagombo Snuff Box, 1999)
- FUBAR (Look at the Birdie, 2009)
- Girl Pool (While Mortals Sleep, 2011)
- Rome (Sucker's Portfolio, 2013)
- Miss Snow, You're Fired (Sucker's Portfolio, 2013)
- Paris, France (Sucker's Portfolio, 2013)
- City (never-before-published)

=== Part 5: Work Ethic versus Fame and Fortune ===
- More Stately Mansions (Collier's Magazine, December 22, 1951; also in a collection Welcome to the Monkey House, 1968)
- The Hyannis Port Story (Welcome to the Monkey House, 1968)
- Go Back to Your Precious Wife and Son (Ladies Home Journal, July 1962; also in a collection Welcome to the Monkey House, 1968)
- The Lie (The Saturday Evening Post, February 24, 1962; also in a collection Welcome to the Monkey House, 1968)
- Deer in the Works (Esquire Magazine, April 1955; also in a collection Welcome to the Monkey House, 1968)
- Any Reasonable Offer (Collier's Magazine, January 19, 1952; also in a collection Bagombo Snuff Box, 1999)
- The Package (Collier's Magazine, July 26, 1952; also in a collection Bagombo Snuff Box, 1999)
- Poor Little Rich Town (Collier's Magazine, October 25, 1952; also in a collection Bagombo Snuff Box, 1999)
- A Present for Big Saint Nick (Argosy Magazine, December 1954; also in a collection Bagombo Snuff Box, 1999)
- This Son of Mine (The Saturday Evening Post, August 18, 1956; also in a collection Bagombo Snuff Box, 1999)
- Hal Irwin's Magic Lamp (Cosmopolitan Magazine, June 1957; also in a collection Bagombo Snuff Box, 1999)
- Shout About It from the Housetops (Look at the Birdie, 2009)
- Ed Luby's Key Club (Look at the Birdie, 2009)
- King and Queen of the Universe (Look at the Birdie, 2009)
- $10,000 a Year, Easy (While Mortals Sleep, 2011)
- Money Talks (While Mortals Sleep, 2011)
- While Mortals Sleep (While Mortals Sleep, 2011)
- Tango (While Mortals Sleep, 2011)
- The Humbugs (While Mortals Sleep, 2011)

=== Part 6: Behavior ===
- The Foster Portfolio (Collier's Magazine, September 8, 1951; also in a collection Welcome to the Monkey House, 1968)
- Custom-made Bride (The Saturday Evening Post, March 27, 1954; also in a collection Bagombo Snuff Box, 1999)
- Unpaid Consultant (Cosmopolitan Magazine, March 1955; also in a collection Bagombo Snuff Box, 1999)
- Sucker's Portfolio (Sucker's Portfolio, 2013)
- The Drone King (never-before-published)
- Hello, Red (Look at the Birdie, 2009)
- The Honor of a Newsboy (Look at the Birdie, 2009)
- Tom Edison's Shaggy Dog (Collier's Magazine, March 14, 1953; also in a collection Welcome to the Monkey House, 1968)
- The Man Without No Kiddleys (While Mortals Sleep, 2011)
- The Powder-Blue Dragon (Cosmopolitan Magazine, November 1954; also in a collection Bagombo Snuff Box, 1999)
- Runaways (The Saturday Evening Post, April 15, 1961; also in a collection Bagombo Snuff Box, 1999)
- The Good Explainer (Look at the Birdie, 2009)
- Guardian of the Person (While Mortals Sleep, 2011)
- Bomar (While Mortals Sleep, 2011)
- Requiem for Zeitgeist (never-before-published)
- And on Your Left (never-before-published)

=== Part 7: The Band Director ===
- The Kid Nobody Could Handle (The Saturday Evening Post, September 24, 1955; also in a collection Welcome to the Monkey House, 1968)
- The No-Talent Kid (The Saturday Evening Post, October 25, 1952; also in a collection Bagombo Snuff Box, 1999)
- Ambitious Sophomore (The Saturday Evening Post, May 1954; also in a collection Bagombo Snuff Box, 1999)
- The Boy Who Hated Girls (The Saturday Evening Post, March 31, 1956; also in a collection Bagombo Snuff Box, 1999)
- A Song for Selma (Look at the Birdie, 2009)

=== Part 8: Futuristic ===
- Harrison Bergeron (The Magazine of Fantasy and Science Fiction, October 1961; also in a collection Welcome to the Monkey House, 1968)
- Welcome to the Monkey House (Playboy Magazine, January 1968; also in a collection Welcome to the Monkey House, 1968)
- Adam (Cosmopolitan Magazine, April 1954; also in a collection Welcome to the Monkey House, 1968)
- Tomorrow and Tomorrow and Tomorrow (Galaxy Science Fiction Magazine, January 1954; also in a collection Welcome to the Monkey House, 1968)
- The Big Space Fuck (Again, Dangerous Visions, 1972; also collected in Palm Sunday, 1981)
- 2 B R 0 2 B (Worlds of If Magazine, January 1962; also in a collection Bagombo Snuff Box, 1999)
- Unknown Soldier (Armageddon in Retrospect, 2008)
