= Monkey House =

Monkey House may refer to

- a monkey house, a.k.a. primatarium
  - Monkey House, Bronx Zoo
  - Monkey House, Lahore Zoo
  - Monkey House, Edinburgh Zoo
- Monkey House (band)
- Monkey House (TV series)

== See also ==
- Welcome to the Monkey House
- Welcome to the Monkey House (short story)
