= Palm Sunday (book) =

1981 collection of previously unpublished works by Kurt Vonnegut Jr.

Palm Sunday: An Autobiographical Collage
- First edition cover
- Author: Kurt Vonnegut
- Language: English
- Publisher: Delacorte Press
- Publication date: March 1, 1981
- Publication place: United States
- Media type: Print (Hardcover, Paperback)
- Pages: 330
- ISBN: 0-440-06593-3
- OCLC: 727804010

Palm Sunday: An Autobiographical Collage is a 1981 collection of short stories, speeches, essays, letters, and other previously unpublished works by Kurt Vonnegut. The collection provides insight into Vonnegut's thoughts on various subjects, including writing, war, and his own literary career. The book is known for its eclectic mix of genres and personal reflections.

== Overview ==
Palm Sunday is a self-described "autobiographical collage" that showcases Vonnegut's versatility as a writer. It contains a mix of fiction and non-fiction, including short stories, speeches, essays, letters, and a sermon. The collection is notable for its exploration of themes such as free thought, war, and the role of the writer in society. Vonnegut also reflects on his own works and grades them based on his personal assessment.

== Contents ==
The collection includes the following pieces, written by Vonnegut unless otherwise noted:

- "Dear Mr. McCarthy" (letter)
- "Un-American Nonsense" (essay)
- "God's Law" (speech)
- "Dear Felix" (letter)
- "An Account of the Ancestry of Kurt Vonnegut, Jr, by an Ancient Friend of His Family" (formal essay by John G. Raunch)
- "What I Liked About Cornell" (speech)
- "When I Lost My Innocence" (essay)
- "I Am Embarrassed" (speech)
- "How to Write with Style" (essay)
- Self-interview from The Paris Review
- "Who in America is Truly Happy?" (essay)
- "Something Happened" (review of Joseph Heller's novel Something Happened)
- "The Rocky Graziano of American Letters" (speech)
- "The Best of Bob and Ray" (introduction to a book by Bob Elliott and Ray Goulding)
- "James T. Farrell" (funeral speech)
- "Lavina Lyon" (funeral speech)
- "The Class of '57" (song lyrics by Don and Harold Reid of the Statler Brothers)
- "The Noodle Factory" (speech)
- "Mark Twain" (speech)
- "How Jokes Work" (commencement address)
- "Do Not Mourn!" (funeral speech by Clemens Vonnegut, written for his own funeral)
- "Thoughts of a Free Thinker" (commencement address)
- "William Ellery Channing" (speech)
- "The Big Space Fuck" (short story, originally published in Again, Dangerous Visions)
- "Fear and Loathing in Morristown, N.J." (speech)
- "Dear Mr. X" (letter by Nanette Vonnegut)
- "Jonathan Swift" (rejected introduction to a new edition of Gulliver's Travels)
- "The Chemistry Professor" (treatment for a musical comedy based on Dr Jekyll and Mr Hyde)
- "Louis-Ferdinand Céline" (introduction to paperback editions of Céline's last three novels)
- "Dresden Revisited" (introduction to a new edition of Slaughterhouse-Five)
- "Flowers on the Wall" (song lyrics by Lew DeWitt of the Statler Brothers)
- "Palm Sunday" (sermon)

== Grades ==
In Chapter 18, titled "The Sexual Revolution," Vonnegut grades his own works, emphasizing that the grades are a personal comparison rather than a placement in literary history. The grades are as follows:

- Player Piano: B
- The Sirens of Titan: A
- Mother Night: A
- Cat's Cradle: A+
- God Bless You, Mr. Rosewater: A
- Slaughterhouse-Five: A+
- Welcome to the Monkey House: B−
- Happy Birthday, Wanda June: D
- Breakfast of Champions: C
- Wampeters, Foma and Granfalloons: C
- Slapstick: D
- Jailbird: A
- Palm Sunday: C

== Reception ==
Palm Sunday was well-received for its candid and varied content, offering readers a unique insight into Vonnegut's mind and his views on literature, society, and his personal experiences. The collection has been praised for its humor, wit, and the seamless blending of different literary forms.

== See also ==
- Kurt Vonnegut bibliography
