= Ilium (Kurt Vonnegut) =

Fictional town in Kurt Vonnegut novels and stories

Ilium is a fictional town in eastern New York state, used as a setting for many of Kurt Vonnegut's novels and stories, including Player Piano, Cat's Cradle, Slaughterhouse-Five, and the stories "Deer in the Works", "Poor Little Rich Town", and "Ed Luby's Key Club". The town is dominated by its major industry leader, the Ilium Works, which produces scientific marvels to assist, or possibly harm, human life. The Ilium Works is Vonnegut's symbol for the "impersonal corporate giant" with the power to alter humankind's destiny. The town has been compared to Zenith, the fictional setting in Sinclair Lewis's 1922 novel Babbitt.

In one sense, the name may refer to Troy, New York, because "Ilium" was the name the Romans gave to ancient Troy, although Troy is mentioned as a separate city in Player Piano. This name could also provide irony, for Ilium is such an ancient name for such a satirical and shallow city.

In many other respects, Ilium closely resembles Schenectady, New York, with the fictional Iroquois River standing in for the real Mohawk River, which flows west–east through Schenectady. The Ilium Works is in roughly the same geographic location as the General Electric (GE) plant in Schenectady, where Vonnegut worked as a public relations writer. In Galápagos (1985), GEFFCo is cited as Ilium's principal industry—GE having once been a principal employer in Schenectady. The city of Ilium is distinct from Schenectady in Player Piano (1952), Cat's Cradle (1963), and Slaughterhouse-Five (1969). In those novels, characters refer to Schenectady as a separate place.

It also could be a reference to Ilion, New York, because of the similar spelling and that Ilium may have been the intended name for the town of Ilion.

Cohoes, longtime residence of Vonnegut's character Kilgore Trout, is in the vicinity of Ilium, and of the real towns that inspired it. For example, Cohoes is located immediately west of Troy.

In Galápagos, Mary Hepburn was a high school teacher in Ilium and her husband Roy worked at GEFFCo. In Cat's Cradle, Ilium is the former home of Dr. Felix Hoenikker—one of the fathers of the atomic bomb—thus, it is the town that Jonah visits to interview Dr. Asa Breed, Hoenikker's former supervisor. In Player Piano, it is where most of the action takes place. In Slaughterhouse-Five, it is also the home town of the book's primary protagonist, Billy Pilgrim.
