= Complete Stories =

(The) Complete (Short) Stories may refer to:

- The Complete Stories (Asimov), by Isaac Asimov
- The Complete Short Stories of J. G. Ballard (in two volumes)
- The Complete Short Stories of Ernest Hemingway
- The Complete Stories of Franz Kafka
- The Complete Stories (O'Connor), by Flannery O'Connor
- Dorothy Parker - Complete Stories
- Complete Stories (Vonnegut), by Kurt Vonnegut
- Complete Stories (magazine), a 1930s pulp magazine which published authors such as Robert E. Howard
