= EPICAC =

Epicac or EPICAC may refer to:

- EPICAC (short story), by Kurt Vonnegut
- Syrup of ipecac, emetic substance often used to induce vomiting
