= Canary in a Cat House =

Collection of 12 short stories by Kurt Vonnegut

- First edition cover
- Author: Kurt Vonnegut
- Language: English
- Publisher: Gold Medal Books
- Publication date: 1961
- Publication place: US
- Media type: Print (paperback)
- Pages: 160
- OCLC: 552595

Canary in a Cat House is a collection of twelve short stories by American writer Kurt Vonnegut, published in 1961. Eleven of the twelve appear in the later collection Welcome to the Monkey House, with "Hal Irwin's Magic Lamp" being omitted. In a later collection of short stories, Bagombo Snuff Box, there is a story with the same title; however, it is a different version.

== Contents ==
1. "Report on the Barnhouse Effect" (Collier's, February 11, 1950)
2. "All The King's Horses" (Collier's, February 10, 1951)
3. "D.P."
4. "The Manned Missiles"
5. "The Euphio Question" (Collier's, May 12, 1951)
6. "More Stately Mansions"
7. "The Foster Portfolio"
8. "Deer in the Works"
9. "Hal Irwin's Magic Lamp"
10. "Tom Edison's Shaggy Dog"
11. "Unready to Wear" (Galaxy Science Fiction, April 1953)
12. "Tomorrow and Tomorrow and Tomorrow" (1953)
