= While Mortals Sleep =

While Mortals Sleep may refer to:

- While Mortals Sleep (short story collection), a book by Kurt Vonnegut
- While Mortals Sleep (album), an album by Kate Rusby
