= Fiction writing =

Writing of invented stories

Fiction writing is the composition of non-factual prose texts. Fictional writing often is produced as a story meant to entertain or convey an author's point of view. The result of this may be a short story, novel, novella, screenplay, or drama, which are all types (though not the only types) of fictional writing styles. Different types of authors practice fictional writing, including novelists, playwrights, short story writers, radio dramatists and screenwriters.

== Categories of prose fiction ==
=== Genre fiction ===
A genre is the subject matter or category that writers use. For instance, science fiction, fantasy and mystery fiction are genres. Genre fiction also known as popular fiction, is plot-driven fictional works written with the intent of fitting into a specific literary genre, to appeal to readers and fans already familiar with that genre.

Genre fiction is storytelling driven by plot, as opposed to literary fiction, which focuses more on theme and character. Genre fiction, or popular fiction, is written to appeal to a large audience and it sells more primarily because it is more commercialized. An example is the Twilight series by Stephenie Meyer which may sell more than Herman Melville's Moby-Dick, because the Twilight novels deal with elements of pop culture—romance and vampires.

=== Literary fiction ===
Literary fiction is fictional works that hold literary merit. They are works that offer social commentary, or political criticism, or focus on an aspect of the human condition.

Literary fiction is usually contrasted with, popular, commercial, or genre fiction. Some have described the difference between them in terms of analyzing reality (literary) rather than escaping reality (popular). The contrast between these two categories of fiction is controversial among some critics and scholars.

== Elements of fiction ==
=== Character ===
Characterization is one of the five elements of fiction, along with plot, setting, theme, and writing style. A character is a participant in the story, and is usually a person, but may be any persona, identity, or entity whose existence originates from a fictional work or performance.

Characters may be of several types:

- Point-of-view character: the character by whom the story is viewed. The point-of-view character may or may not also be the main character in the story.
- Protagonist: the main character of a story
- Antagonist: the character who stands in opposition to the protagonist
- Minor character: a character that interacts with the protagonist. They help the story move along.
- Foil character: a (usually minor) character who has traits opposed to those of the main character.

According to Robert McKee, "True character is revealed in the choices a human being makes under pressure—the greater the pressure, the deeper the revelation, the truer the choice to the character's essential nature."

=== Plot ===
The plot, or storyline, is the rendering and ordering of the events and actions of a story. Starting with the initiating event, then the rising action, conflict, climax, falling action, and possibly ending with a resolution.

Plot consists of action and reaction, also referred to as stimulus and response, and has a beginning, a middle, and an ending.

The climax of the novel consists of a single action-packed sentence in which the conflict (problem) of the novel is resolved. This sentence comes towards the end of the novel. The main part of the action should come before the climax.

Plot also has a mid-level structure: scene and sequel. A scene is a unit of drama—where the action occurs. Then, after a transition of some sort, comes the sequel—an emotional reaction and regrouping, an aftermath.

=== Setting ===
Setting is the locale and time of a story. The setting is often a real place but may be a fictitious city or country within our own world; a different planet; or an alternate universe, which may or may not have similarities with our own universe. Sometimes setting is referred to as milieu, to include a context (such as society) beyond the immediate surroundings of the story. It is basically where and when the story takes place.

=== Theme ===
Theme is what the author is trying to tell the reader. For example, the belief in the ultimate good in people, or that things are not always what they seem. This is often referred to as the "moral of the story." Some fiction contains advanced themes like morality, or the value of life, whereas other stories have no theme, or a very shallow one.

=== Style ===
Style includes the multitude of choices fiction writers make, consciously or not, in the process of writing a story. It encompasses not only the big-picture, strategic choices such as point of view and choice of narrator, but also tactical choices of grammar, punctuation, word usage, sentence and paragraph length and structure, tone, the use of imagery, chapter selection, titles, etc. In the process of creating a story, these choices meld to become the writer's voice, their own unique style.

==== Narrator ====
The narrator is the storyteller. The main character in the book can also be the narrator.

==== Point of view ====
Point of view is the perspective (or type of personal or non-personal "lens") through which a story is communicated. Narrative point of view or narrative perspective describes the position of the narrator, that is, the character of the storyteller, in relation to the story being told.

==== Tone ====
The tone of a literary work expresses the writer's attitude toward or feelings about the subject matter and audience.

==== Suspension of disbelief ====
Suspension of disbelief is the reader's temporary acceptance of story elements as believable, regardless of how implausible they may seem in real life.

== Authors' views on writing ==
Ernest Hemingway wrote "Prose is architecture, not interior decoration."

Stephen King, in his non-fiction, part autobiographical, part self-help writing memoir, On Writing: A Memoir of the Craft, he gives readers advice on honing their craft: "Description begins in the writer's imagination, but should finish in the reader's."

Kurt Vonnegut the author of praised novels Cat's Cradle, Slaughterhouse-Five, and Breakfast of Champions, has given his readers, from his short story collection, Bagombo Snuff Box, eight rules on how to write a successful story. The list can be found in the introduction of the collection.

"Now lend me your ears. Here is Creative Writing 101:

1. Use the time of a total stranger in such a way that he or she will not feel the time was wasted.
2. Give the reader at least one character he or she can root for.
3. Every character should want something, even if it is only a glass of water.
4. Every sentence must do one of two things—reveal character or advance the action.
5. Start as close to the end as possible.
6. Be a sadist. No matter how sweet and innocent your leading characters, make awful things happen to them—in order that the reader may see what they are made of.
7. Write to please just one person. If you open a window and make love to the world, so to speak, your story will get pneumonia.
8. Give your readers as much information as possible as soon as possible. To heck with suspense. Readers should have such complete understanding of what is going on, where and why, that they could finish the story themselves, should cockroaches eat the last few pages."

== See also ==
- Creative writing
- Fan fiction
- Fiction
- Figure of speech
- Foreshadowing
- List of writers' conferences
- Literary criticism
- Literary festival
- Literary fiction
- Literary technique
- Literature
- Novelist
- A Reader's Manifesto
- Show, don't tell
- Writer
- Writer's block
- Writing style

== Bibliography ==
- Vonnegut, Kurt (1999). Bagombo Snuff Box. G. Putnam's Sons. pp. 9–10, –154. ISBN 0-399-14505-2.
- King, Stephen (2000). On Writing: A Memoir of the Craft. Scribner. pp. 153–, –154. ISBN 0-684-85352-3.
- Abbott, Jillian (Sep, 2005). "How to keep tabs on your novel's progress". The Writer, p. 39.
- Frey, James N. (1987). How to Write a Damn Good Novel. New York: St. Martin's Press. p. 164. ISBN 0-312-01044-3.
- Tom, Monteleone (2004). The Complete Idiot's Guide to Writing a Novel. Scribner. p. 51. ISBN 1-59257-172-7.
- Leder, Meg, ed. (2002). The Complete Handbook of Novel Writing. Writer's Digest Books. p. 324. ISBN 1-58297-160-9.
- Lou Willett, Stanek (1994). So You Want to Write a Novel. Avon Books. p. 15. ISBN 0-380-77688-X.
