= Wampeters, Foma and Granfalloons =

1974 collection of essays by Kurt Vonnegut

- First edition
- Author: Kurt Vonnegut
- Language: English
- Publisher: Delacorte Press
- Publication date: 1974
- Publication place: United States
- Media type: Print (Paperback)
- Pages: 324
- ISBN: 978-0-385-33381-8

Wampeters, Foma & Granfalloons (Opinions) is a collection of essays, reviews, short travel accounts, and human interest stories written by Kurt Vonnegut from c. 1966–1974.

== On the title ==
Vonnegut explains the title in the introduction:

Dear Reader: The title of this book is composed of three words from my novel Cat's Cradle. A "wampeter" is an object around which the lives of many otherwise unrelated people may revolve. The Holy Grail would be a case in point. "Foma" are harmless untruths, intended to comfort simple souls. An example: "Prosperity is just around the corner." A "granfalloon" is a proud and meaningless association of human beings. Taken together, the words form as good an umbrella as any for this collection of some of the reviews and essays I've written, a few of the speeches I made.

== Contents ==
- "Science Fiction" - Vonnegut's reflections on writing science fiction.
- "Brief Encounters on the Inland Waterway" (1966) - This recounts a journey from Massachusetts to Florida on the Kennedy yacht crewing for their captain, Frank Wirtanen (whose name had been borrowed for the character of an American intelligence officer in Mother Night).
- "Hello, Star Vega" - about the book Intelligent Life In The Universe by I.S. Shklovskii and Carl Sagan.
- "Teaching the Unteachable"
- "Yes, We Have No Nirvanas" - an essay about the rise of the Maharishi Mahesh Yogi in American culture.
- "Fortitude" - The only work of fiction in the book.
- "There's a Maniac Loose Out There" - An essay for Life Magazine about convicted serial killer Tony Costa.
- "Excelsior! We're Going to the Moon! Excelsior!"
- "Address to the American Physical Society"
- "Good Missiles, Good Manners, Good Night"
- "Why They Read Hesse" - as in Hermann Hesse.
- "Oversexed in Indianapolis" - Vonnegut's appraisal of Dan Wakefield's Going All the Way.
- "The Mysterious Madame Blavatsky"
- "Biafra: A People Betrayed" - Vonnegut writes about his experiences in Biafra shortly before the country fell to Nigerian forces.
- "Address to Graduating Class at Bennington College, 1970"
- "Torture and Blubber"
- "Address to the National Institute of Arts and Letters, 1971"
- "Reflections on My Own Death"
- "In a Manner that Must Shame God Himself" - Comments on the nature of the U.S.'s two-party system (and the problems these divisions create).
- "Thinking Unthinkable, Speaking Unspeakable"
- "Address at Rededication of Wheaton College Library, 1973"
- "Invite Rita Rait to America!"
- "Address to P.E.N. Conference in Stockholm, 1973"
- "A Political Disease"
- "Playboy Interview"

== Vonnegut's style ==
A characteristic of this short nonfiction is that Vonnegut frequently includes himself directly, as he starts to do in his novels from the 1960s. He may write reportage, but he is open about who is reporting and how he feels about what he is reporting. One of the most interesting aspects of this material for the reader is the emergent relationship between observer-writer and subject. By revealing his attitudes to the subject he reveals much of himself. Vonnegut's association with the short story was far from over, however, and he later prepared and introduced a new collection, Welcome to the Monkey House (1968), which included eleven of the twelve stories from Canary in a Cathouse and fourteen others.
