= Tomorrow, the Stars =

- Cover of first edition (hardcover)
- Editor: Robert A. Heinlein
- Illustrator: Richard M. Powers
- Language: English
- Genre: Science fiction
- Publisher: Doubleday Books
- Publication date: 1952
- Publication place: United States
- Media type: Print (hardback & paperback)
- Pages: 249
- OCLC: 1240835

Tomorrow, the Stars is an anthology of speculative fiction short stories, presented as edited by American author Robert A. Heinlein and published in 1952.

Heinlein wrote a six-page introduction in which he discussed the nature of science fiction, speculative fiction, escapist stories, and literature. None of the stories had previously been anthologized.

According to science fiction historian Bud Webster, Heinlein's introduction and name on the book were his sole contributions; the actual selection of the stories, and the work involved in arranging for their publication, was done by Frederik Pohl and Judith Merril. This is confirmed by Virginia Heinlein in Grumbles from the Grave (without mentioning Pohl or Merril) and by Pohl in chapter 6 of his autobiography, The Way the Future Was. However, the correspondence between Heinlein and Merril, now housed in Library and Archives Canada, shows that while Heinlein claimed to be uninvolved in the editing, he certainly had some input into the structure and contents of the book:

I am the lowest form of literary prostitute, swindling the public into thinking that I have done a piece of editing which I aint done and aint going to do ... On the issue of whether or not the volume should have a theme: I don’t give a hoot about a theme; I’d like to see stories picked for highest possible entertainment value. I can’t think of any other real excuse for putting out another S-F anthology ... I'll be of more help, I hope, a month from now when I can get at my files of magazines and books.

== The Stories ==
- "I'm Scared" by Jack Finney, 1951
- "The Silly Season" by Cyril M. Kornbluth, 1950
- "The Report on the Barnhouse Effect" by Kurt Vonnegut, 1950
- "The Tourist Trade" by Bob Tucker, 1950
- "The Rainmaker" by John Reese, 1949
- "Absalom" by Henry Kuttner, 1946
- "The Monster" by Lester del Rey, 1951
- "Jay Score" by Eric Frank Russell, 1941
- "Betelgeuse Bridge" by William Tenn, 1950 Available online
- "Survival Ship" by Judith Merril, 1950
- "Keyhole" by Murray Leinster, 1951
- "Misbegotten Missionary" by Isaac Asimov, 1950
- "The Sack" by William Morrison, 1950
- "Poor Superman" by Fritz Leiber, 1951

== Editions ==
It was published in 1952 in hardcover by Doubleday and Company, Inc., published 1953 in paperback. The Library of Congress Control Number of the hardcover was 52-5218.

== Reception ==
P. Schuyler Miller found the stories to be "all smoothly professional, all enjoyable, some of them mind-tickling." Damon Knight judged that of the fourteen stories in the volume, "ten are A's, four B's; there are no stinkers at all", and asserted that each of the ten excellent stories "is a pretty good approximation of the last word on its subject."

== Sources ==
- Anthopology 101: They Blinded Us... With Science!, column by Bud Webster in the Spring, 2006, issue of The Bulletin of the Science Fiction and Fantasy Writers of America, and also *Anthopology 101: The Deans' List(s), in the December, 2004, issue of Science Fiction Chronicle.
