= Welcome to the Monkey House (short story) =

- Short story by Kurt Vonnegut Jr.
- Country: United States
- Language: English
- Genre: Science fiction

Publication
- Published in: Playboy
- Publication date: January 1968

"Welcome to the Monkey House" is a short story by Kurt Vonnegut originally published in Playboy (January 1968). It is also part of the collection of the same name. It is alluded to in God Bless You, Mr. Rosewater as one of Kilgore Trout's stories.

== Plot summary ==
In the not-so-distant future, the population of Earth has risen to 17 billion. To reduce overcrowding, the world government requires all citizens to take thrice-daily doses of a drug that numbs them from the waist down (thus depriving them of any pleasure from sexual intercourse), and also maintains a network of "Ethical Suicide" Parlors in which virginal female hostesses assist clients in ending their lives. A clandestine resistance group called the "nothingheads" has formed, whose members refuse to take the mandatory drugs.

One member of the group, a criminal named Billy the Poet, is known to have deflowered several Ethical Suicide Parlor hostesses. He is at large and making his way to Cape Cod, targeting the parlor in Hyannis. Despite the authorities' attempts to catch him, Billy reaches the parlor and abducts hostess Nancy McLuhan at gunpoint, telling her that the numbing drugs were developed by a pharmacist who was disgusted by the sight of a monkey masturbating at the local zoo. Billy is assisted by a gang of fellow nothingheads, including some of his past victims, and he rapes Nancy after her latest dose wears off. Afterward, he explains to her that the solution to the overpopulation problem lies not in encouraging suicide and taking all the pleasure out of sex, but rather in the use of birth control pills. He lets her go and leaves her a bottle of the pills, with a label reading "Welcome to the Monkey House."

== Main characters ==
Nancy McLuhan:

Nancy McLuhan is a hostess working at the Federal Ethical Suicide Parlor of Hyannis. She unites all the skills and virtues a suicide hostess has to fulfill: She is a virgin and convinced of the correctness of the laws of the government. She is an expert in judo and karate and holds advanced degrees in psychology and nursing. Furthermore, she is plump, rosy and six feet tall and wears the typical hostess's uniform, which includes heavy makeup, purple stockings and black boots. She looks 22 years old although she is already 63. This is because of the anti-aging shots people get twice a year. Nancy has adopted the conventions the government has established for society, but there is still a side of her that recognizes that this way of living is not quite right. When Billy the Poet's helpers make her drink a truth serum and ask her what it feels like to be a virgin at 63, she answers, "Pointless." Vonnegut biographer Peter J. Reed suggests that "being an overgrown Barbie doll administering ethical suicide might well seem pointless. But the passage implies that her still being a virgin causes her to feel pointless, purpose evidently residing in her being a wife and mother."

Billy the Poet:

Billy the Poet is a so-called nothinghead who refuses to take the ethical birth control pills and tries to seduce Ethical Suicide Parlor hostesses. He does so for his own ideology. He agrees with the world government that overpopulation is a threat to the stability of the world, but he thinks that human instincts such as sexuality must not be suppressed. He therefore gives the hostesses birth control pills that prevent reproduction but do not interfere with sexuality. Billy is not a strong alpha-male hero. He is not physically attractive and does not seek power. He intends to bring an innocent pleasure back into the world and tries to express his tenderness by leaving Nancy a book of poetry containing Elizabeth Barrett Browning's "How do I love thee? Let me count the ways," which was the poem his grandfather read to his grandmother on their wedding night. He does not see his actions as real violations toward the hostesses. He explains to Nancy that what she went through with him was pretty much the same thing a lot of brides experienced a hundred years ago on their wedding night. He claims that many hostesses have afterwards become sexual enthusiasts. He wants all the people in the world to have this opportunity. His mission is quite successful; when he brings Nancy to the Kennedy Compound, there is already a group of his supporters waiting for them: members of his nothinghead underground culture.

J. Edgar Nation:

The title of the story, which is also the inscription on the label of the birth control pills Billy offers, refers to the history of the government's numbing pills. The druggist J. Edgar Nation had taken his family to the zoo on Easter Sunday. When they passed by the monkey house, a monkey was playing with his genitals. Believing that this behavior destroyed the spirit of Easter, Nation decided to invent the numbing pills for animals. Later on, when people stayed young and attractive in the long term because of the invention of the anti-aging shots, the pills were also imposed on humans. J. Edgar Nation's name is a mixture made up by Vonnegut that derives from J. Edgar Hoover and Carrie Nation. Hoover, who was the F.B.I. director at the time the story was written, "was vigorous in his moral judgments," and Nation fought alcohol. Her message is also present in the story, as Nancy is convinced that alcohol, or more precisely gin, is the worst drug of all.

== Motifs and criticism ==
=== Sexuality and depiction of rape ===
The story was originally published in Playboy in January 1968, and some of the aspects discussed seem to be written right for this very readership. Written at the peak of the sexual revolution during the late 1960s, the story was highly topical at that time. It was also that year when Pope Paul VI published an encyclical detailing the new official Catholic position against birth control pills and artificial contraception.

The story depicts what has been described as a "corrective rape"—the character of Billy the Poet rapes women "to liberate them from frigidity", an act he claims these women later come to understand and appreciate. He rapes McLuhan at gunpoint, with eight accomplices holding her down, saying "I have spent this night and many others like it, attempting to restore a certain amount of innocent pleasure to the world, which is poorer in pleasure than it needs to be." Vonnegut appears to empathize with this view, while not recognizing the rape for what it is, to the dismay of fans of his work. The story has been described as celebrating a number of myths with regard to rape: that women who dress provocatively deserve to be raped, that women secretly want to be raped, and that "stuck-up" women should be humbled through rape.

=== Egalitarianism ===
In the case of "Welcome to the Monkey House," this fake moralism is imposed by a world government. Vonnegut often discussed the dangers of egalitarianism, but not to the extent that one single system forms and controls all the people in the world. Everything has been made equal; from the fact that all Suicide Parlors have purple roofs and the ever-adjacent Howard Johnson's diners orange ones, to the egalitarian television programs, people's young looks and the fact that no one has sex. Equality endangers individuality; Vonnegut has "consistently decried the self-righteousness that imposes controls on the individual human rights of others." His arguments are even more harshly presented in another short story of his, "Harrison Bergeron" (1965), in which Americans are controlled by a government that wants to equalize people physically and mentally by handicapping them.

=== Overpopulation ===
Another problem Vonnegut discusses in "Welcome to the Monkey House" is the overpopulation of the world. In the story, 17 billion human beings live on planet earth. They sit at home watching television programs which are controlled by the government. These programs aim to enforce the government's power by showing advertisements and shows which propagate the laws and rulers and also the principles of Ethical Suicide. Almost all the work is done by machines. This leads to the fact that most of the people are unemployed. Even in the restaurant (Howard Johnson's) which is next to all Suicide Parlors, all the work is done by a machine. To make people feel more comfortable eating there, since some found the silence resulting from the lack of a human staff to be intimidating, a record produces regular restaurant noise. Furthermore, most species of animals and plants in the world are extinct, such as bees, birds and mosquitoes, because they had to step back from growing mankind. The measures the government develops to prevent further growth of population are drastic: the rulers encourage ethical suicide and prevent reproduction by numbing the lower part of people's bodies. Vonnegut mentions overpopulation not only in "Welcome to the Monkey House" but also in another story from the same collection, "The Big Trip Up Yonder/Tomorrow and Tomorrow and Tomorrow" (1954), in which he describes how in the Year 2158, six generations of a family live together in just one small apartment. Some of these ideas are also present in Vonnegut's story 2 B R 0 2 B. He wants to draw his readers' attention to the threat of overpopulation in order to avoid the scenarios that are described in his stories.

== Style ==
Reading the story, it can be recognized the extent to which Vonnegut was influenced by his early work as a journalist. His sentences are rather short and easy to read, in order to reach and be understood by as many people as possible. The dystopian, science fictional setting underlines his social and political critique. Vonnegut gives a futuristic preview of what could become of the world if people will not change. Despite the rather drastic plot, Vonnegut still intends the story to be funny. There are a lot of humorous elements to be found: J. Edgar Nation and his being offended by a masturbating monkey; the "president of the world"; Ma Kennedy, who has a "THIMK" sign in her office; people who take birth control pills having blue urine; or the Kennedy Compound as a museum. The entertaining, ironic hints draw more attention to the fine details of the story. Vonnegut uses humor, at times very black humor, to communicate his serious message.

== Publication history ==
- First published in January 1968 in Playboy magazine.
- Published in August 1968 in the collection Welcome to the Monkey House by Delacorte Press.
- Re-released on September 8, 1998 in the re-publication of Welcome to the Monkey House by Dial Press.

== Adaptations ==
- One of the segments of the 1972 TV movie Between Time and Timbuktu, which presented elements from various works by Vonnegut, was inspired by "Welcome to the Monkey House".
- Showtime presented Kurt Vonnegut's Monkey House in 1991, an anthology series that uses this title for the program but does not feature an episode based on this story.

== See also ==
- Sexual revolution
- Suicide booth
- Euthanasia
- One-child policy
