= Granfalloon =

Concept in Kurt Vonnegut's Bokononism

A granfalloon, in the fictional religion of Bokononism (created by Kurt Vonnegut in his 1963 novel Cat's Cradle), is defined as a "false karass". That is, it is a group of people who affect a shared identity or purpose, but whose mutual association is meaningless.

As quoted in And So It Goes: Kurt Vonnegut: A Life (2011) by Charles J. Shields, Vonnegut writes in his introduction to his book Wampeters, Foma and Granfalloons (1974) that a "granfalloon is a proud and meaningless collection of human beings"; Shields also comments that in the same book, Vonnegut later cites the demonym of 'Hoosiers' as "one of [Vonnegut's] favorite examples" of what the term embodies. Another example of a granfalloon given in Cat's Cradle is 'alumni of Cornell University'. Kurt Vonnegut himself was born in Indiana and attended Cornell University, making him a member of both of these particular granfalloons.

== Examples ==
The most commonly purported granfalloons are associations and societies based on a shared but ultimately fabricated premise. Examples from Cat's Cradle include: "the Communist Party, the Daughters of the American Revolution, the General Electric Company—and any nation, anytime, anywhere." A more general and oft-cited quote defines a granfalloon as "a proud and meaningless association of human beings". Other examples of granfalloons cited in the novel include Hoosiers and Cornellians (those who attended Cornell University)—both of which include the fictional narrator and Vonnegut himself.

If you wish to examine a granfalloon, just remove the skin of a toy balloon. — Bokonon

"My God," she said, "are you a Hoosier?"
I admitted I was.
"I'm a Hoosier, too," she crowed. "Nobody has to be ashamed of being a Hoosier."
"I'm not," I said. "I never knew anybody who was."
– Kurt Vonnegut, Cat's Cradle

"His gaze lit on Newt again. "You go to college?"
"Cornell," said Newt.
"Cornell!" cried Crosby gladly. "My God, I went to Cornell."
"So did he." Newt nodded at me.
"Three Cornellians – all in the same plane!" said Crosby, and we had another granfalloon festival on our hands.
– Kurt Vonnegut, Cat's Cradle

They had found a can of white paint, and on the front doors of the cab Frank had painted white stars, and on the roof he had painted the letters of a granfalloon: U.S.A.
– Kurt Vonnegut, Cat's Cradle

== Granfalloon technique ==
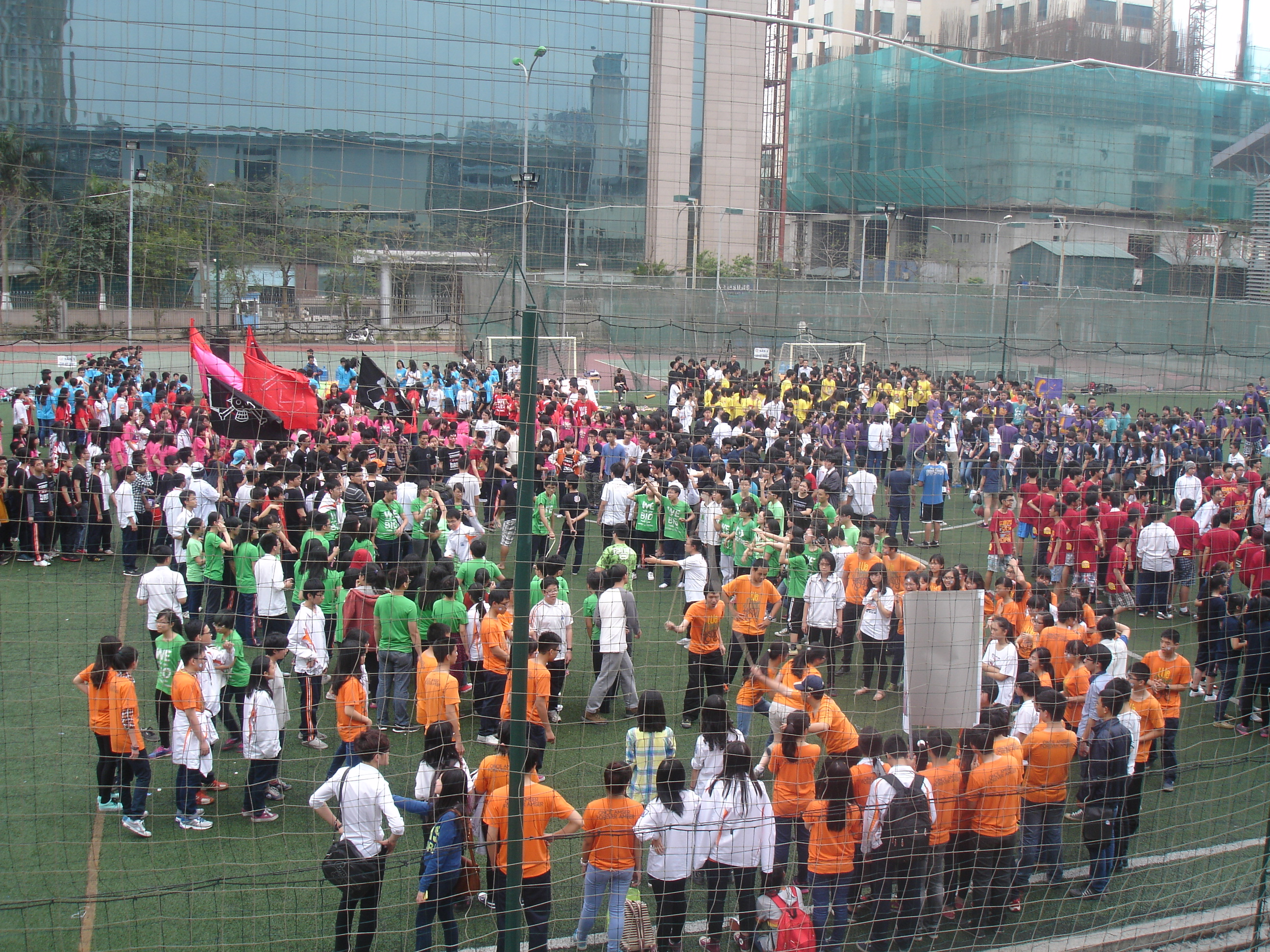
For a sport festival, participants are randomly split into color groups.

The granfalloon technique is a method of persuasion in which individuals are encouraged to identify with a particular granfalloon or social group. The pressure to identify with a group is meant as a method of securing the individual's loyalty and commitment through adoption of the group's symbols, rituals, and beliefs.

In social psychology, the concept stems from research by the Polish social psychologist Henri Tajfel, whose findings have come to be known as the minimal group paradigm. In his research, Tajfel found that strangers would form groups on the basis of completely inconsequential criteria.

In one study, Tajfel subjects were asked to watch a coin toss. They were then designated to a particular group based on whether the coin landed on heads or tails. The subjects placed in groups based on such meaningless associations between them have consistently been found to "act as if those sharing the meaningless labels were kin or close friends."

Researchers since Tajfel have made strides into unraveling the mystery behind this phenomenon. Today it is broken down into two basic psychological processes, one cognitive and one motivational.

First, knowing that one is a part of this group is used to make sense of the world. When one associates with a particular group, those in the group focus on the similarities between the members. However, for people not in the group, or "outsiders", differences are focused upon and often exaggerated. A problem with the granfalloon is that it often leads to in-group, out-group bias.

Second, social groups provide a source of self-esteem and pride, a form of reverse Groucho Marxism as in his famous remark "I don't care to belong to any club that would have me as a member."

The imagined communities of Benedict Anderson form a similar concept. Therapist Grant Devilly considers that granfalloons are one explanation for how pseudoscientific topics are promoted.

== See also ==
- Granfalloon (fanzine)
- Tribalism
