= Displaced Person (American Playhouse) =

1985 American Playhouse episode

"Displaced Person" is a 1985 Emmy Award-winning episode of American anthology television series American Playhouse, based on a short story by Kurt Vonnegut. It was directed by Alan Bridges and adapted by Fred Barron from a story in the Welcome to the Monkey House collection. The title of the story in that collection was D.P.

As in many other Vonnegut works, the story is framed by World War II. In it a black German orphan looking for his father finds instead a black U.S. service member (played by Stan Shaw). The show won an Emmy for "Outstanding Children's program" for its producers, including Barry Levinson.
