= Like Shaking Hands with God =

Book by Kurt Vonnegut

Like Shaking Hands with God: A Conversation about Writing
- Author: Kurt Vonnegut, Lee Stringer
- Publication date: 1999

Like Shaking Hands with God: A Conversation about Writing is a book which consists of two conversations between Kurt Vonnegut and Lee Stringer with Ross Klavan as moderator and containing a foreword by Daniel Simon. It was published in 1999. The first conversation occurred on October 1, 1998, at a book store on Union Square in Manhattan, and the second occurred the following evening at a cafe.

Like Shaking Hands With God was meant to be a conversation about writing but turned into much more. As The Hartford Advocate said, it is "...a book that is more about being than writing." In Like Shaking Hands With God the authors touch on the subject of writing, how to write, how a writer should view their audience and what the ultimate goal of writing should be.
