= Fortitude (play) =

1968 play by Kurt Vonnegut

Fortitude is a short science fiction play by Kurt Vonnegut, first published in Playboy in September 1968. Inspired by Mary Shelley's Frankenstein (1818), it concerns Sylvia Lovejoy, a woman whose head is kept alive by machines controlled by her physician, Dr. Norbert Frankenstein. The play addresses cyborg rights and the ethics of prolonging life. It was collected in Wampeters, Foma and Granfalloons (1974) and later adapted for the television series Kurt Vonnegut's Monkey House.

== Publication history ==
In the preface to Wampeters, Foma and Granfalloons, Vonnegut described Fortitude as a screenplay for a short science fiction film that had not been produced. He identified it as the collection's only work of fiction. Following its September 1968 publication in Playboy, the play was reprinted in the 1974 collection.

It subsequently appeared in Human-Machines: An Anthology of Stories About Cyborgs (1975), edited by Thomas N. Scortia and George Zebrowski, and The Ultimate Frankenstein (1991), edited by Byron Preiss. In 2011, it was included in the Library of America volume Novels & Stories 1963–1973, edited by Sidney Offit.

== Synopsis ==
Dr. Elbert Little visits the laboratory of Dr. Norbert Frankenstein and his assistant, Dr. Tom Swift. Their patient, Sylvia Lovejoy, survives as a head on a tripod, connected to machinery that replaces her bodily organs. Frankenstein demonstrates that the equipment also allows him to alter her moods.

Sylvia has written to Little asking him to bring her cyanide. Her beautician and confidante, Gloria, urges Frankenstein to let her die. Frankenstein knows of Sylvia's request because he reads her outgoing letters, and he explains that her mechanical arms have been designed to prevent her from harming herself.

Gloria returns to Sylvia's room and leaves a pistol in her knitting bag. Sylvia finds the weapon but cannot turn it on herself. When Frankenstein tells her that the machinery can sustain two people, she shoots him. Little and Swift preserve Frankenstein's head, which is placed on a second tripod beside Sylvia.

== Themes ==
The play revisits Shelley's concern with a creator's obligations toward a creation. An Indiana Humanities discussion contrasted Victor Frankenstein's abandonment of his creature with Norbert Frankenstein's refusal to let Sylvia die. In Frankenstein 200 (2018), Rebecca Baumann interprets the play's depiction of male power and control as subversive in the context of its original publication in Playboy.

The name Norbert Frankenstein combines Shelley's Victor Frankenstein with Norbert Wiener, a founder of cybernetics. His assistant's name refers to the Tom Swift books, which celebrate scientific and technological progress.

== Television adaptation ==
Fortitude was adapted as an episode of Kurt Vonnegut's Monkey House, broadcast in December 1992. The Showtime adaptation starred Frank Langella, who won the award for actor in a dramatic series at the 1993 CableACE Awards. The episode also won the award for writing a dramatic series.
