= Lee Stringer =

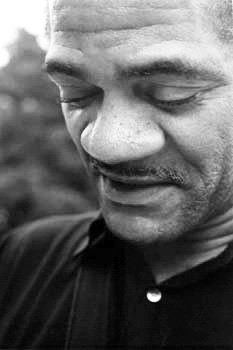
Stringer, in New Orleans, Louisiana, in June 2004

Lee Stringer is an American writer who lived unhoused with a substance use disorder in New York City from the early 1980s until the mid-1990s. He is a former editor and columnist of Street News. His essays and articles have appeared in a variety of publications, including The Nation, The New York Times, and Newsday. He currently lives in Mamaroneck, New York. He is the author of Sleepaway School and Grand Central Winter: Stories from the Street. Stringer also took part in a discussion on writing with Kurt Vonnegut for a book entitled Like Shaking Hands With God. Stringer was a winner of the Doe Fund 2nd Annual Murray Kempton Award in 1998, and Grand Central Winter: Stories from the Street was a New York Times Book Review Notable Book that same year. Grand Central Winter: Stories from the Street was also nominated for a Quality Paperback Book Club New Voices Award.

He discovered his talent when he was searching for an instrument with which to push the filters in his crack stem from one end to the other, so that he could smoke the remaining resin. What he found was a pencil, which he subsequently also used to write a short story called "No Place to Call Home", which he then sent to Street News. Eventually writing won out over drugs as a passion; Stringer checked himself into a Project Renewal, Inc. homeless shelter and treatment center, and with their help was able to kick his addiction.

His first published book chronicling his years on the street, Grand Central Winter: Stories From the Street, (Seven Stories Press, 1997) made the top ten recommended book lists of both USA Today and the New York Times, went on to publication in 18 languages and won a Washington Irving Award, and a Murray Kenton Award. He received the Lannan Foundation residency fellowship in 2005.

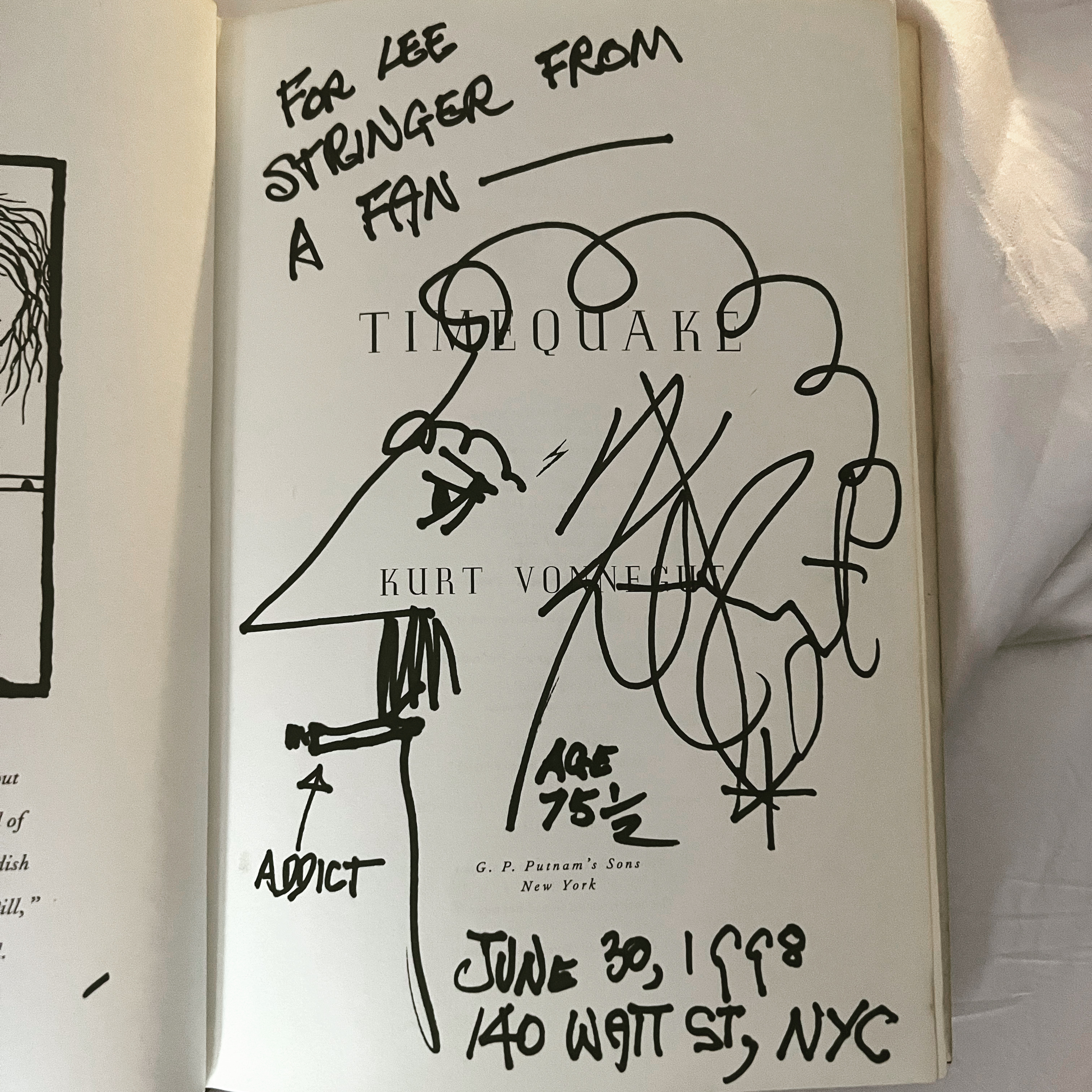
Personalized inscription of Timequake from Kurt Vonnegut to Lee Stringer around the time of their collaboration.

== Books ==
- Lee Stringer (1998). Grand Central Winter. Seven Stories Press. ISBN 1-888363-57-6
- Lee Stringer, Kurt Vonnegut (2000). Like Shaking Hands With God. Seven Stories Press. ISBN 1-58322-002-X
- Lee Stringer (2004). Sleepaway School. Seven Stories Press. ISBN 1-58322-478-5
- Lee Stringer (2010). Grand Central Winter: Expanded Second Edition. Seven Stories Press. ISBN 1-58322-918-3
