= Miss Temptation =

- Short story by Kurt Vonnegut
- Country: United States
- Language: English
- Genre: Short story

Publication
- Published in: The Saturday Evening Post, (1st edition); Welcome to the Monkey House
- Publication type: Newspaper (1st edition)
- Media type: Print
- Publication date: 1956

"Miss Temptation" is a short story written by Kurt Vonnegut, published in The Saturday Evening Post in 1956. The story was collected in Vonnegut's 1968 anthology Welcome to the Monkey House and was reprinted online by The Saturday Evening Post in 2011.

== Plot summary ==
Miss Temptation's real name is Susanna, and she lives in a small room above a fire house, in a little town with a theater, in which she hopes to make her acting debut. Susanna is beautiful, exciting, and every man's dream; she wears hoop earrings and is perpetually barefoot. To those who gather in the country store to see her make her daily "entrance," she brings a rainbow to a dreary world. However, to Norman Fuller, a shy and lonely young man, her beauty is too much to bear. In an angry outburst at her, precipitated by years of rejection and hurt feelings from the female sex, he takes out his frustration against all pretty young women.

However, neither Fuller nor anyone else had realized just how fragile and vulnerable Susanna really is. She is alone in a new town, and no man her age will even go out of their way to be nice to her. Emotionally shattered by Fuller's outburst, Susanna decides to move out of her apartment — but on the day she is to leave, Fuller arrives at her door. After an emotionally draining conversation, Susanna forgives Fuller for his hurtful words, and the two walk down main street and welcome Susanna back to the "human race."
