= While Mortals Sleep (short story collection) =

2011 collection of short stories by Kurt Vonnegut

- First edition
- Author: Kurt Vonnegut
- Cover artist: Kurt Vonnegut
- Language: English
- Publisher: Delacorte Press
- Publication date: January 25, 2011
- Publication place: United States
- Pages: 272
- ISBN: 978-0-385-34373-2

While Mortals Sleep is a collection of fifteen previously unpublished short stories by Kurt Vonnegut, and one that was previously published, released on January 25, 2011. It is the third posthumously published Kurt Vonnegut book, the first being Armageddon in Retrospect, the second being Look at the Birdie. The book begins with a foreword by Dave Eggers. Illustrations by Vonnegut himself appear throughout.

== Contents ==
1. "Jenny"
2. "The Epizootic"
3. "Hundred-Dollar Kisses"
4. "Guardian of the Person"
5. "With His Hand on the Throttle"
6. "Girl Pool"
7. "Ruth"
8. "While Mortals Sleep" (previously published in 1952 as "Christmas Contest")
9. "Out, Brief Candle"
10. "Tango"
11. "Bomar"
12. "The Man Without No Kiddleys"
13. "Mr. Z"
14. "$10,000 a Year, Easy"
15. "Money Talks"
16. "The Humbugs"
