= Who Am I This Time? =

- Short story by Kurt Vonnegut
- Original title: "My Name Is Everyone"
- Country: United States
- Language: English

Publication
- Published in: The Saturday Evening Post (1st edition); Welcome to the Monkey House
- Publication type: Magazine (1st edition)
- Media type: Print
- Publication date: 1961

"Who Am I This Time?" is a short story written by Kurt Vonnegut, published in The Saturday Evening Post in 1961 as "My Name Is Everyone". The story was collected in Vonnegut's anthology Welcome to the Monkey House, published in 1968.

== Synopsis ==
The story centers on a character named Harry Nash, who is an extremely shy and characterless small-town man. However, whenever he takes a part in the local amateur theater production, he personifies the character to an overwhelming extent. Helene Shaw, a recent addition to the town and participant in the local play currently in production, falls in love—not with Nash, but with his character in the play.

== Main characters ==
Harry Nash is a clerk at Miller's Hardware Store who acts in local amateur productions at the North Crawford Mask and Wig Club. He's known for his ability to completely personify a role, whatever it calls for. Before the story's timeline, his roles included Captain Queeg in The Caine Mutiny Court Martial, Abe Lincoln in Abe Lincoln in Illinois, the young architect in The Moon is Blue, Henry VIII in Anne of the Thousand Days and Doc in Come Back, Little Sheba. He's also known for his intense shyness when he's out of character or without a script in front of him. When approached with a new role, he asks "Who am I this time?". In the story, he plays Marlon Brando's role in A Streetcar Named Desire. It's in this context that he meets Helene, who plays his wife on stage. He ultimately marries Helene.

Helene Shaw works for a phone company and travels the country teaching local girls how to take care of the company's new billing machine. The director notices her beauty and persuades her to audition for a part in A Streetcar Named Desire. Her initial audition falls flat as she seemingly has no passion to draw on. She confesses that she's never been in love but that she wants to be. It's not until she reads the script again, with Harry fully in character, that she's able to tap into the emotion necessary for the part. Over the course of the auditions, she falls in love with Harry's onstage persona. After the final performance, she gives him a copy of Romeo and Juliet which they read from and, together, they take on the characters' personas. She stays in North Crawford, marries Harry a week later and they seem to be happy, depending on which play they're reading from that week.

The short story is written from the unnamed director's point of view.

== Adaptations ==
- The short story was made in a short television movie in 1982 starring Christopher Walken and Susan Sarandon and directed by Jonathan Demme.
- In 2008 it was adapted into a radio play for BBC Radio 4 starring Lou Hirsch, Kerry Shale, Joanne Froggatt and Maureen Lipman.
