= Tomorrow and Tomorrow and Tomorrow (short story) =

Short story by Kurt Vonnegut, published in 1954

"Tomorrow and Tomorrow and Tomorrow" is a short story by Kurt Vonnegut originally written in 1953. It was first published in Galaxy Science Fiction magazine in January 1954, where the story was titled "The Big Trip Up Yonder", which is the protagonist's euphemism for dying. A revised version bearing the title "Tomorrow and Tomorrow and Tomorrow" appeared in Vonnegut's collection of short stories, Canary in a Cat House (1961), and was reprinted in Welcome to the Monkey House (1968). The new title comes from the famous line in Shakespeare's play Macbeth starting "Tomorrow and tomorrow and tomorrow".

== Setting ==
The original story is set in 2185 A.D., 102 years after the invention of a medicine called anti-gerasone, which halts the aging process and prevents people from dying of old age as long as they keep taking it. Anti-gerasone is cheap and plentiful, made from mud and dandelions. As a result, the world now suffers from severe overpopulation and shortages of food and resources. With the exception of the wealthy, most of the population appears to survive on a diet of foods made from processed seaweed and sawdust. An outside authority figure within the story, a cautionary tale, admonishes the population that "most of the world's ills can be traced to the fact that Man's knowledge of himself has not kept pace with his knowledge of the physical world".

== Plot ==
The Schwartz family, headed by 172-year-old Harold ("Gramps"), inhabits a three-room apartment in New York City, which has grown so large due to overpopulation that it now spills into the state of Connecticut. Gramps' grandson Louis, his wife Emerald, and 20 other descendants are crowded into the space, perpetually jockeying for Gramps' favor. Gramps gets the best food and the only private bedroom, and controls everyone's life by constantly revising his will to disinherit anyone who earns his displeasure.

An offhand remark by Lou prompts Gramps to disinherit him and exile Lou and Em to the worst sleeping space in the apartment, near the bathroom. Lou then catches his great-grandnephew, newly wed Mortimer, diluting Gramps' anti-gerasone in the bathroom. Fearing Gramps' reaction to such a scheme, Lou tries to empty the bottle and refill it with the full-strength medicine, but accidentally breaks the bottle and is caught by Gramps, who only tells him to clean up the mess. The next morning, the family finds Gramps' bed empty and a note informing them that he is gone; the note also contains a revised will that bequeaths his entire estate to be held in common by his descendants, with no stipulations as to who receives what property.

A riot breaks out as the family members start fighting over who gets the bedroom, leading to everyone being arrested and jailed at the police station. Lou and Em find the cells to be comfortable and spacious compared to the apartment, and hope that they will be sentenced to prison so they can keep these living arrangements. Meanwhile, Gramps has returned to the now-empty apartment, having watched the events unfold from a tavern across the plaza. He has hired the best lawyer in town in order to get everyone convicted, so that he can have the apartment to himself and they can enjoy the relative comfort of jail for a while. Gramps sees a television commercial for a new product called Super-anti-gerasone, which can reverse the aging process instead of just halting it, and starts thinking about being able to enjoy life again.

== Variations between the two versions ==
The main difference between the first and later version of the story is the addition of a long expository section at the beginning, consisting of a conversation between Lou and Em. This prologue makes explicit certain facts that were only implied in the original. Other alterations include changing the year from 2185 to 2158, and changing the family name from Ford to Schwartz.
