= Sucker's Portfolio =

2013 short story collection by Kurt Vonnegut

- First edition
- Author: Kurt Vonnegut
- Language: English
- Genre: Speculative fiction
- Publisher: Amazon Publishing
- Publication date: March 12, 2013
- Publication place: United States
- Media type: Print, E-book
- Pages: 190
- ISBN: 9781480516557

Sucker's Portfolio, by Kurt Vonnegut, is a collection of six short stories, one non-fiction essay, and one unfinished short story written by Vonnegut and published posthumously by Amazon Publishing. The collection was initially made available in episodes as a Kindle Serial on November 20, 2012. The complete book was later released on March 12, 2013.

== Contents ==
1. Between Timid and Timbuktu
2. Rome
3. Eden by the River
4. Sucker's Portfolio
5. Miss Snow, You're Fired
6. Paris, France
7. The Last Tasmanian
8. Robotville and Mr. Caslow
