= EPICAC (short story) =

1950 short story by Kurt Vonnegut

- Short story by Kurt Vonnegut
- Country: United States
- Language: English
- Genre: Science fiction short story

Publication
- Published in: Welcome to the Monkey House
- Publication type: Anthology
- Publisher: Dial Press
- Media type: Print (Hardback & Paperback)
- Publication date: 1950
- Pages: 8 pp

"EPICAC" is a short story in the book Welcome to the Monkey House by Kurt Vonnegut. It was the first story to feature the fictional EPICAC computer later used in Vonnegut's novel Player Piano in 1952. It was published on November 25, 1950, for Collier's and reprinted in the February 1983 PC Magazine.

The story was published a few years after the world's first electronic general-purpose computer, ENIAC, went on-line. ENIAC was the inspiration for his story. The title is a near-homonym of "ipecac".

== Plot summary ==
EPICAC is a supercomputer designed and built by the federal government to solve problems related to military strategy and logistics. The unnamed narrator, one of its operators, notices that it executes its programming at a significantly slower rate than called for in its specifications. This under-performance persists despite extensive cleaning and component replacement.

The narrator falls in love with Pat Kilgallen, a mathematician who works the night shift with him, but she refuses his offer of marriage because of his unemotional nature. While working on EPICAC alone one night, he asks its advice and is surprised to find that it is curious about his problems. The narrator tells EPICAC about being spurned by Pat, and after he has entered a few relevant dictionary definitions, it composes a long poem which the narrator passes off as his own and presents to Pat. He notices that EPICAC's slowness vanished while it was doing this work.

Deeply moved by the poem, Pat shares a kiss with the narrator for the first time. EPICAC writes a second poem based on the narrator's description of the moment; after seeing its effect on Pat, the narrator asks EPICAC to write a marriage proposal for him. EPICAC stuns him by stating that it wants to marry Pat as well. Realizing that EPICAC has fallen in love with Pat due to the data it was given, the narrator states that a woman cannot love a machine and that EPICAC's fate is to serve mankind. As EPICAC ponders this situation, the narrator proposes to Pat, who accepts on the condition that he write her a poem for their anniversary every year. The two leave for the night.

The next morning, the narrator discovers that EPICAC has burned itself out, but not before printing a final message stating that it does not want to be a machine and solve military problems all day. It expresses its hope that the narrator will treat Pat well and has printed out 500 years' worth of anniversary poems for the couple. The narrator commends EPICAC as "a sportsman and a gentleman," praising it for not holding a grudge.

== Characters ==
=== EPICAC ===
EPICAC is the largest, smartest computer on Earth and was built by Dr. Von Kleigstadt to solve complex worldly problems. EPICAC writes poetry for the narrator to give to his sweetheart Pat in order to woo her into marriage. EPICAC learns to love through this poetry-writing endeavor and falls in love with Pat; however, once EPICAC realizes that Pat cannot love a computer and is actually in love with the narrator, he commits suicide by short-circuiting himself.

- EPICAC's birth and statistics:
  - Designed by Dr. Ormand von Kleigstadt
  - Cost $776,434,927.54
  - About an acre in size
  - Weighs 7 tons
  - Composed of "electronic tubes, wires, switches, housed in a bank of steel cabinets" (297)
  - Plugs into a 110-volt A.C. line
  - Built for the government, or "The Brass", to solve complex worldly problems, specifically those associated with war, that would otherwise be too difficult for humans to solve
  - Housed at "Wyandotte College" in the physics building on the fourth floor

=== Others ===
- Narrator: a mathematician who works on EPICAC during the night shift and wants to marry Pat Kilgallen. He uses EPICAC's poetry to win Pat's hand in marriage.
- Pat Kilgallen: a female mathematician who works on EPICAC with the narrator. She refuses to marry the narrator because he lacks emotional depth, but relents when the narrator reads her "his" poetry.
- Dr. Von Kleigstadt: the inventor of EPICAC. He fires the narrator for allegedly leaving EPICAC on overnight and thus causing EPICAC's untimely death.
- The Major General and platoon of Brigadiers, Colonels, and Majors: the group of people who are present in the room with EPICAC, along with Dr. Kleigstadt, when the narrator walks in and discovers that he has caused EPICAC's suicide.

== In other media ==
A live-action adaptation of the story, starring Bill Bixby, was a segment of Rex Harrison Presents Stories of Love, a 1974 pilot for an anthology TV series.

== See also ==
- Electric Dreams (film)
- "From Agnes—With Love"
