= Harrison Bergeron =

1961 short story by Kurt Vonnegut

- Short story by Kurt Vonnegut
- Country: United States
- Language: English
- Genres: Dystopia, science fiction, political fiction, satire

Publication
- Published in: The Magazine of Fantasy and Science Fiction
- Publication type: Periodical
- Media type: Print (magazine)
- Publication date: October 1961
- Award: Prometheus Award: Hall of Fame

"Harrison Bergeron" is a satirical dystopian science-fiction short story by American writer Kurt Vonnegut, first published in October 1961. Originally published in The Magazine of Fantasy and Science Fiction, the story was republished in the author's Welcome to the Monkey House collection in 1968.

== Plot ==
In 2081, the United States Constitution has been amended to require that all Americans are fully equal and must have the same level of intelligence, appearance, and physical ability. Diana Moon Glampers, the Handicapper General, and her agents enforce the equality laws by forcing citizens to wear "handicaps" like ugly masks for those who are too beautiful, earpiece radios for the intelligent that broadcast irritating noises meant to disrupt thoughts, and heavy weights for the strong or athletic.

George and Hazel Bergeron have a 14-year-old son named Harrison. He takes after his father, who is highly intelligent and physically strong. The government removes Harrison from his home. His parents are barely aware of that due to Hazel's low intelligence and George's mandated handicaps.

George and Hazel watch a ballet on TV one day. Some dancers are weighed down to counteract their gracefulness and masked to hide their attractiveness. George's thoughts are continually interrupted by the different noises emitted by his handicap radio. Hazel urges George to lie down and rest his "handicap bag" (a 47-pound (21 kg) cloth bag filled with birdshot and locked around his neck). She suggests taking a few of the lead balls out of the bag, but George resists because it is against the law and he will have to endure two years of prison and pay a $2,000 fine for every lead ball he takes out.

On TV, a reporter with a speech impediment (like every other announcer) struggles to read a bulletin and hands it to the ballerina wearing the ugliest mask and heaviest weights. She begins reading in her natural, beautiful voice before switching and changing to a more unpleasant one, as it would be unfair for her to use such a beautiful voice. Harrison's escape from prison is announced, and a full-body photograph of him is shown upright after several tries to face it upright by the showrunners. He is seven feet (2.1 m) tall and burdened by three hundred pounds (140 kg) of handicaps.

George recognizes his son for a moment, before having the thought eliminated by his radio. Harrison storms the TV studio in an attempt to overthrow the government. He declares himself emperor and rips off both his own handicaps and those of the ballerina who previously read the news bulletin, who is then elected to be his empress when given the option. Harrison then orders the musicians in the studio to play their best music while the two of them dance.

Suddenly, the Handicapper General bursts into the studio and kills Harrison and the empress on the spot with two shotgun blasts while they are in the middle of a long kiss. She threatens the musicians at gunpoint to put on their handicaps again before the TV goes dark. George, who left to get a beer, returns. He asks Hazel why she is crying, to which she replies that something sad happened on television that she cannot remember.

== Characters ==
- Harrison Bergeron is the fourteen-year-old son of George Bergeron and Hazel Bergeron, who is 7 feet (2.1 m) tall, a genius, and an extraordinarily handsome, athletic, strong, and brave person.
- George Bergeron is Harrison's father and Hazel's husband. A very smart and sensitive character, he is handicapped artificially by the government.
- Hazel Bergeron is Harrison's mother and George's wife. Hazel has what is described as perfectly average intelligence, which means that she cannot think deeply about anything.
- The Ballerina, a beautiful dancer who was burdened with an especially ugly mask and excessive weights, as she is the fairest, most beautiful and most graceful of the dancers.
- Diana Moon Glampers is the Handicapper General. Vonnegut re-used the name for a character in God Bless You, Mr. Rosewater.

== Themes ==
=== Equality and Authoritarianism ===
With its satiric exaggerations, “Harrison Bergeron” functions as a reductio ad absurdum argument against egalitarianism. The depictions of excessive handicaps, such as weights and unattractive masks, and “the grimness of the inevitable reduction of the population to something close to its lowest common denominator” reduce the government’s radical egalitarianism to absurdity. Instead of creating fairness by helping citizens with deficiencies or taking an equitable approach, the Handicapper General “levels down” anyone with above-average skills, intelligence, or looks. Additionally, because everyone is equal, people lose their individuality.

== Adaptations ==
The story has been adapted for the screen several times.

- PBS adapted several stories, including Harrison Bergeron, in Between Time and Timbuktu (1972), with Avind Haerum in the title role.
- In 1995, Showtime produced a full-length made-for-television adaptation entitled Harrison Bergeron, starring Sean Astin as the title character and Christopher Plummer as John Klaxon. The adaptation diverged from the plot considerably, featuring Harrison being recruited by the National Administration Center, a secret cabal of geniuses within the government who ensure that the handicapped United States functions. Working for the television division, Harrison becomes dissatisfied with the status quo and attempts to start another American revolution by taking over the nation's television broadcasting. He broadcasts old unhandicapped movies and music, while encouraging people to remove the brain-handicapping "bands" on their heads.
- In 2006, a short film also entitled Harrison Bergeron was released.
- In 2009, another short film called 2081 was based on the original story and starred Armie Hammer as Harrison Bergeron. Joe Crowe, managing editor of the online magazine Revolution Science Fiction, described the movie as "stirring and dramatic" and said it "gets right to the point, and nails the adaptation in about 25 minutes."
- In 2024, an audio-only adaptation of Harrison Bergeron was produced for radio and streaming audiences by Peabody Award-winning audio producer and documentarian Greg Barron.

== Cultural references ==
In 2005, the story was quoted by attorneys in a brief before the Kansas Supreme Court. Vonnegut was quoted as saying that while he did not mind the story being used in the suit, he disagreed with the lawyers' interpretation of it.

U.S. Supreme Court Justice Antonin Scalia quoted the story in his dissenting opinion in PGA Tour, Inc. v. Martin.

A 2013 academic paper criticizing the new hyperandrogenism policies of the International Association of Athletics Federations and the International Olympic Committee was entitled "The Harrison Bergeron Olympics" and several non-academics had similar criticisms.

== See also ==
- Crab mentality
- Dumbing down
- Handicap principle
- Law of Jante
- The Marching Morons
- Procrustes
- The Starlit Corridor
- Tall poppy syndrome
- Anthem (novella)
- The Cutie Map
