= Player Piano (novel) =

First novel published by Kurt Vonnegut in 1952

- First edition, hardcover
- Author: Kurt Vonnegut Jr.
- Language: English
- Genre: Science fiction
- Publisher: Charles Scribner's Sons
- Publication date: August 18, 1952
- Publication place: United States
- Media type: Print (hardback & paperback)
- Pages: 296
- Dewey Decimal: 813.54
- LC Class: PS3572.O5

Player Piano is the debut novel by American writer Kurt Vonnegut Jr., published in 1952. The novel depicts a dystopia of automation partly inspired by the author's time working at General Electric, describing the negative impact technology can have on quality of life. The story takes place in a near-future society that is almost totally mechanized, eliminating the need for human laborers. The widespread mechanization creates conflict between the wealthy upper class, the engineers and managers, who keep society running, and the lower class, whose skills and purpose in society have been replaced by machines. The book uses irony and sentimentality, which were to become hallmarks developed further in Vonnegut's later works.

== Plot ==
While most Americans were fighting in the third world war, the nation's managers and engineers responded by developing ingenious automated systems that allowed factories to operate with only a few workers. Ten years after the war, most workers have now been replaced by machines. The polarization of the population is represented by the division of Ilium, New York, into "Homestead", where every person not a manager or an engineer lives – added to by the growing number of those displaced from that status – and the industrialized north side of the river, inhabited by those who service and develop the machines.

The novel develops two parallel plotlines that converge only briefly at the beginning and the end of the story. The more prominent plot centers on Dr. Paul Proteus, the intelligent, 35-year-old manager of Ilium Works. The secondary plot follows the American tour of the Shah of Bratpuhr, a spiritual leader of six million residents in a distant, underdeveloped nation. These provide contrasting perspectives: that of Paul, as the embodiment of what a man within the American industrial system should strive to be, and the other of a visitor from a contrasting culture, but in which there is also a simple binary social system.

The main story follows Paul's development from an uncritical cog in the system to one of its critics. Paul's father had held a supremo status that had given him almost complete control over the nation's economy. Paul has inherited his father's reputation but harbors an uneasy dissatisfaction with the industrial system and his own contribution to society. His acknowledgment of that feeling is heightened when Ed Finnerty, an old friend whom Paul holds in high regard, informs him that he has quit his important engineering job in Washington, D.C.

Paul and Finnerty visit the "Homestead" section of town, where workers who have been displaced by machines live out their meaningless lives in mass-produced houses. There they meet Lasher, an Episcopal minister with a M.S. in anthropology, who helps the two engineers realize the unfairness of the system from which they have profited. Eventually learning that Lasher is the leader of a rebel group known as the "Ghost Shirt Society", Finnerty instantly takes up with him. Paul is not yet bold enough to make a clean break until his superiors ask him to betray Finnerty and Lasher.

Paul purchases a rundown farm with the intention of starting a new life there with his wife, Anita. She, however, is disgusted by the prospect of such a radically different and less privileged lifestyle. "Of all the people on the north side of the river, Anita was the only one whose contempt for those in Homestead was laced with active hatred.... If Paul …hadn't married her, this was where she'd be, what she'd be." But for the moment, she uses her sexual hold on Paul to convince him to stay and compete with two other engineers, Dr. Shepherd and Dr. Garth, for a more prominent position in Pittsburgh.

While Paul takes part in the annual managerial bonding event at "the Meadows", his superiors tell him that he has been chosen to infiltrate the "Ghost Shirt Society", and rumors of his disloyalty to the system are circulated. Then, after arriving in Homestead, he is kidnapped and drugged by Society operatives and later made the organization's public (but largely nominal) figurehead. Paul's name is famous and so the organization intends to use it to their advantage. However, in the first committee meeting that Paul attends, he is captured during a police raid.

Paul is now put on public trial, but as the general population begins to riot, destroying the automated factories, he is freed. The mob, once unleashed, now goes further than the leaders had planned, destroying all means of production regardless of usefulness. Despite the brief and impressive success of the rebellion, the military quickly surrounds the town, while the population begin to use their innate abilities to rebuild the machines of their own volition. Paul, Finnerty, Lasher, and other committee members of the Society acknowledge that at least they have stood against the government's oppressive system before surrendering themselves.

== Major themes ==
The automation of industry and the effect that it has on society are the predominant themes of Player Piano. It is "a novel about people and machines, and machines frequently got the best of it, as machines will." More specifically, it delves into a theme to which Vonnegut returns, "a problem whose queasy horrors will eventually be made world-wide by the sophistication of machines. The problem is this: How to love people who have no use." Unlike much dystopian fiction, the novel's society was created by indifference, both of the populace and the technology that replaced it. As such, it is the sense of purposelessness of those living in a capitalistic society that has outgrown a need for them that must be rectified.

Mankind's blind faith in technology and its usually-disastrous effect on society as well as the dehumanization of the poor or oppressed later became common themes throughout Vonnegut's work. Throughout his life, Vonnegut continued to believe the novel's themes were of relevance to society, writing, for example, in 1983 that the novel was becoming "more timely with each passing day".

== Style ==
Player Piano displays the beginnings of the idiosyncratic style that Vonnegut developed and employed throughout much of his career. It has early inklings of the hallmark Vonnegutian flair of using meta-fiction, such as when a writer's wife describes her husband's dilemma to the Shah of Bratpuhr in the back of the limousine: that the writer's "anti-machine" novel cannot get a passing "readability quotient" under the reading machine's scoring algorithm. However, the fourth wall does not get broken, as in later writings. His style of self-contained chapters "of no more than five hundred words, often as few as fifty", which would come to define his writing, had yet to be developed.

== Background ==
=== Influences ===
In a 1973 interview, Vonnegut discussed his inspiration to write the book:

I was working for General Electric at the time, right after World War II, and I saw a milling machine for cutting the rotors on jet engines, gas turbines. This was a very expensive thing for a machinist to do, to cut what is essentially one of those Brâncuși forms. So they had a computer-operated milling machine built to cut the blades, and I was fascinated by that. This was in 1949 and the guys who were working on it were foreseeing all sorts of machines being run by little boxes and punched cards. Player Piano was my response to the implications of having everything run by little boxes. The idea of doing that, you know, made sense, perfect sense. To have a little clicking box make all the decisions wasn't a vicious thing to do. But it was too bad for the human beings who got their dignity from their jobs.

In the same interview, he acknowledges that he "cheerfully ripped off the plot of Brave New World, whose plot had been cheerfully ripped off from Yevgeny Zamyatin's We."

=== Title ===
A player piano is a modified piano that "plays itself". The piano keys move according to a pattern of holes punched in an unwinding scroll. Unlike a music synthesizer, the instrument actually produces the sound itself, with the keys moving up and down, driving hammers that strike the strings. Like its counterpart, a player piano can be played by hand as well. When a roll is run through the instrument, the movement of its keys produce the illusion that an invisible performer is playing the instrument. Vonnegut uses the player piano as a metaphor to represent how even the most simple of activities, such as teaching oneself how to play the piano in one's spare time, has been replaced by machines instead of people. Early in the book, Paul Proteus's friend and future member of the Ghost Shirt Society, Ed Finnerty, is shown manually playing a player piano, suggesting the idea of humans reclaiming their animus from the machines. The book's most tragic character is Rudy Hertz, the machinist who was the prototype recorded by the machines. They are player pianos replicating his physical motions.

== Publication history ==
This satirical take on industrialization and the rhetoric of General Electric and the big corporations, which discussed arguments very topical in the postwar United States, was instead advertised by the publisher with the more innocuous and marketable label of "science fiction", a genre that was booming in mass popular culture in the 1950s. Vonnegut, surprised by that reception, wrote, "I learned from reviewers that I was a science-fiction author. I didn't know that." He was distressed because he felt that science fiction was shoved in a drawer which "many serious critics regularly mistake... for a urinal" because "[t]he feeling persists that no one can simultaneously be a respectable writer and understand how a refrigerator works."

Cover of Utopia 14, as the novel was titled for a 1954 release

Player Piano was later released in paperback by Bantam Books in 1954 under the title Utopia 14 in an effort to drive sales with readers of science fiction. Paul Proteus' trial was dramatized in the 1972 TV movie Between Time and Timbuktu, which presented elements from various works by Vonnegut.

In 2009, Audible.com produced an audio version of Player Piano, narrated by Christian Rummel, as part of its Modern Vanguard line of audiobooks.

In the Italian translation, Player Piano is rendered as Piano meccanico, a double-entendre, which, by itself, can mean either "player piano" or "mechanical plan".

== Reception ==
The science fiction anthologist Groff Conklin reviewed the novel in Galaxy Science Fiction, declaring it "a biting, vividly alive and very effectively understated anti-Utopia." The founding editors of The Magazine of Fantasy & Science Fiction, Anthony Boucher and J. Francis McComas, named Player Piano to their "year's best" list, describing it as "Human, satirical, and exciting;... by far the most successful of the recent attempts to graft science fiction onto the serious 'straight' novel." They praised Vonnegut for "blending skillfully a psychological study of the persistent human problems in a mechanistically 'ideal' society, a vigorous melodramatic story-line, and a sharp Voltairean satire.

Player Piano was nominated for the International Fantasy Award in 1953.

== See also ==
- 1952 in science fiction
- Technological unemployment
