= Happy Birthday, Wanda June =

1971 film by Mark Robson

- First edition
- Directed by: Mark Robson
- Written by: Kurt Vonnegut (play and screenplay)
- Produced by: Lester M. Goldsmith
- Starring: Rod Steiger; Susannah York
- Cinematography: Fred J. Koenekamp
- Edited by: Dorothy Spencer
- Production companies: Red Lion; Sourdough; The Filmakers Group
- Distributed by: Columbia Pictures
- Release date: December 9, 1971
- Running time: 105 minutes
- Country: United States
- Language: English

Happy Birthday, Wanda June is a 1971 American comedy-drama film directed by Mark Robson, based on a 1970 play by Kurt Vonnegut.

== Plot ==
The opening of this play is "This is a simple-minded play about men who enjoy killing, and those who don't."

Big-game hunter and war hero Harold Ryan returns home to America, after having been presumed dead for several years. During the war, he killed over 200 men and women, and countless more animals — for sport. He was in the Amazon rainforest hunting for diamonds with Colonel Looseleaf Harper, a slow-witted aviation hero, who had the unhappy task of dropping the atomic bomb on Nagasaki. Harold finds that his wife Penelope has developed relationships with men very much unlike himself, including a vacuum cleaner salesman called Shuttle and a hippie doctor called Dr. Woodly, who later becomes Ryan's foe. He also finds that his son, Paul, has been pampered and grown unmanly. Set in 1960s America, Ryan feels the country has become weak, all the heroes have been replaced by intolerable pacifists, and that in postwar America, no proper enemy is available for him to vanquish.

Wanda June is a young girl who died before she could celebrate her birthday when a drunk ice cream truck driver ran her over. She is very pleased with her situation in Heaven, and feels that dying is a good thing: in Heaven, everyone loves the person who sent them there. Her birthday cake was subsequently purchased by one of Penelope's lovers, for a celebration of Ryan's birthday in his absence. Wanda June and several other deceased connections to Ryan (including his ex-wife Mildred who drank herself to death because she could not stand Harold's premature ejaculation, and Major Siegfried von Konigswald, the Beast of Yugoslavia, Ryan's most infamous victim) speak to the audience from Heaven, where Jesus, Judas Iscariot, Adolf Hitler, and Albert Einstein are happily playing shuffleboard.

== Cast ==
- Rod Steiger as Harold Ryan
- Susannah York as Penelope Ryan
- George Grizzard as Dr. Norbert Woodley
- Don Murray as Herb Shuttle
- William Hickey as Looseleaf Harper
- Steven Paul as Paul Ryan
- Pamelyn Ferdin as Wanda June
- Pamela Saunders as Mildred Ryan
- Louis Turenne as Major von Koningswald

== Productions and adaptations ==
Happy Birthday, Wanda June originated as a play titled Penelope, first performed at the Orleans Arena Theater in Orleans, Massachusetts. An interview with Vonnegut about the premiere of his play at the Arena Theatre is part of the film about the Arena entitled "Stagestruck: Confessions from Summer Stock Theatre", available on PBS.

Vonnegut and composer Richard Auldon Clark collaborated on an opera adaptation which was debuted at Butler University in 2016, nine years after Vonnegut's death.

The Gene Frankel Theater staged an Off-Off-Broadway revival in April 2018, directed by Jeff Wise and featuring Jason O'Connell, Kate MacCluggage, and Matt Harrington. and a later off-Broadway revival, in November 2018, with the same performers, by the Wheelhouse Theater Company, at The Duke on 42nd Street.

== See also ==
- List of American films of 1971
