= Who Am I This Time? (film) =

- Genre: Comedy; Drama
- Written by: Neal Miller
- Story by: Kurt Vonnegut
- Directed by: Jonathan Demme
- Starring: Christopher Walken; Susan Sarandon
- Music by: John Cale
- Country of origin: United States
- Original language: English

Production
- Producer: Neal Miller
- Cinematography: Paul Vombrack
- Editor: Mark Leif
- Running time: 53 minutes
- Production company: Rubicon Film Productions

Original release
- Network: PBS
- Release: February 2, 1982

Who Am I This Time? is a 1982 American made-for-television comedy-drama film directed by Jonathan Demme and based on the 1961 short story of the same name by Kurt Vonnegut. It is the fourth episode of the first season of PBS' American Playhouse series which aired on February 2, 1982.

== Plot ==
Harry Nash, a hardware store clerk, has achieved a degree of local celebrity due to his powerful performances in community theatre. Yet when not on the stage or in a rehearsal, Harry retreats into an insecure and painfully shy personality. He remains unsocial most of the time. Typically, after a performance of Cyrano de Bergerac, Harry is not equipped to handle being besieged by local fangirls, and he retreats in panic, as is his custom.

Helene Shaw, a telephone company billing expert intending to stay in town for only eight weeks, is persuaded by a customer (the play's director) into auditioning for the role of Stella, opposite Harry's Stanley Kowalski in a production of A Streetcar Named Desire. Initially during the audition Helene is stiff and awkward, but when Harry arrives, already immersed in his Stanley Kowalski persona, fireworks result between them as they relate as Stanley and Stella during the audition, continuing during rehearsals.

The first night’s performance of Streetcar is sold out, with Harry and Helene in top form and acclaimed by enthusiastic applause. Once again, Harry disappears as soon as the performance ends, before the applause even dies down. Ignoring warnings of Harry's introverted personality, Helene falls in love with Harry's "Stanley" persona. She arranges to stay in town permanently, determined to draw Harry out of his shell. Her attempts to get to know Harry better are thwarted when he continues to immediately disappear after each performance. When Helene succeeds in getting him to share a sandwich and asks him about his family, he replies that he grew up as an orphan, and quickly retreats despite her apology for prying. She mistakes his cluelessness and shyness for rejection.

The awkwardness between them results in a clumsy and uneven performance on the second night of the play, but Helene bounces back in time for closing night, due to an inspiration: her closing-night gift to Harry is a copy of Romeo and Juliet. Stepping into the Romeo role, Harry is able to read the lines and speak of love with confidence. After a series of such recitals—with Harry as Mark Antony, Henry Higgins, and Henry V—Harry proposes to Helene as Ernest Worthing, in character, acting out a scene from Oscar Wilde's The Importance of Being Earnest. Their friends, who witness the “performance,” applaud their engagement. The director informs Helene and Henry that the community is looking forward to their playing the leads in the company’s next production. Harry, who has Helene in his embrace, whispers in Helene’s ear and Helene interprets, “Who are we this time?”

== Cast ==
- Susan Sarandon as Helene Shaw
- Christopher Walken as Harry Nash
- Robert Ridgely as George Johnson
- Dorothy Patterson as Doris
- Caitlin Hart as Lydia
- Les Podewell as Les
- Aaron Freeman as Andrew

== Production ==
=== Music ===
The film's score was composed by John Cale of The Velvet Underground.

=== Locations ===
Hinckley, Illinois served as stand-in for fictional North Crawford. Oakton School in Evanston, Illinois was used for the school building, including the library and playgrounds.

=== Writing ===
The quotations recited by the actors, from Cyrano de Bergerac to The Importance of Being Earnest, are often paraphrased. In the opening act, Harry Nash delivers the final lines of Cyrano, which were taken not from the well-known translations of the standard texts, but from the film adaptation Cyrano de Bergerac (1950), with translation by Brian Hooker. Edmond Rostand's final two words in the original French version were My panache!, which is usually used in translations.

Hooker's version, which Christopher Walken/Cyrano declaims, changes his final phrase to "My white plume!" Panache means plume; here, the literary reference is to King Henry IV of France, who was famous for wearing a white plume in his helmet and for his war cry: "Follow my white plume!" (French: Ralliez-vous à mon panache blanc!).

Another slight variation occurs in the final lines, when Helene accepts Harry's proposal of marriage and says, "I hope that after we marry, you'll always look at me just like this... especially in front of other people!" In the original play by Oscar Wilde, the line is, "I hope you will always look at me just like that, especially when there are other people present."

In Vonnegut's short story, the character George Johnson is the first-person narrator. He meets Helene while trying to sort out a phone bill and asks her to try out for the local play.

== Reception ==
The New York Times published a review saying that the script was "touchingly adapted" from Vonnegut's story.

Howard Rosenberg of the Los Angeles Times called Who Am I This Time? "a smashing adaptation of a Kurt Vonnegut story." Daily Variety praised Demme, saying he "directed with finesse," and said that producer Neal Miller "coaxes his characters along with becoming humor."

Joe Meyers, host of the debut of the second annual "Short Cuts" series celebrating the art of the short film at the Garden Cinema festival in Norwalk, Connecticut in 2011, described the film as "one of the most charming short films of the modern era."

Time Out (London) called the film "totally delightful" with "a great deal of charm and wit."

Dramatist/reviewer Sheila O'Malley writes that Who Am I This Time? is "one of the best movies about acting, and what it is, and why, that I have ever seen... it is a funny and accurate look at why grown men and women put on costumes and cavort about with fake swords for a paying populace."

== Accolades ==
Who Am I This Time? won the "Best Television Production Award" at the Semana Internacional De Cinema de Barcelona, invitational screenings in Russia (ACT I) and Italy (Venice Film Festival), and at the San Francisco International Film Festival.
