= 2 B R 0 2 B =

1962 short story by Kurt Vonnegut

- Short story by Kurt Vonnegut
- Country: United States
- Language: English
- Genre: Science fiction

Publication
- Published in: Worlds of If Science Fiction
- Publication type: Magazine
- Publication date: January 1962

2 B R 0 2 B
An audio recording of 2 B R 0 2 B

"2 B R 0 2 B" is a science fiction short story by American author Kurt Vonnegut. It was first published in the January 1962 issue of If: Worlds of Science Fiction and later collected in Vonnegut's Bagombo Snuff Box (1999). The title is pronounced "2 B R naught 2 B" and references the famous phrase "to be, or not to be" from William Shakespeare's Hamlet.

In the story, the title is a telephone number used to schedule an assisted suicide with the Federal Bureau of Termination. Vonnegut's 1965 novel God Bless You, Mr. Rosewater mentions a story of the same name and attributes it to his recurring character Kilgore Trout, but its plot more closely resembles that of the title story from Vonnegut's collection Welcome to the Monkey House.

== Plot summary ==
The setting is a society in which aging has been cured, people can live indefinitely, and population control is used to limit the population of the United States to 40 million, a figure maintained through a combination of infanticide and government-assisted suicide. For someone to be born, someone else must first volunteer to die. As a result, births are rare, and deaths occur primarily by accident.

The scene is a waiting room at the Chicago Lying-In Hospital, where Edward K. Wehling Jr. learns that his wife is about to give birth to triplets, but he has found only one person, his maternal grandfather, who will volunteer to die. A painter on a stepladder is redecorating the room with a mural depicting hospital employees, including Dr. Benjamin Hitz, the hospital's chief obstetrician. Leora Duncan, from the Service Division of the Federal Bureau of Termination, arrives to pose for the mural. It is a picture of a well-tended garden, and a metaphor for the United States at the time. Dr. Hitz later enters and speaks with everyone except the painter.

It becomes apparent to all that Wehling is in a state of despair, since he does not want to send his grandfather and two of his children to death. Dr. Hitz questions Wehling's belief in the system and tries to make Wehling feel better by explaining how the surviving child will "live on a happy, roomy, clean, rich planet". Suddenly, Wehling draws a revolver and kills Dr. Hitz and Leora Duncan. He then kills himself, "making room for all three children".

The painter, who is about 200 years old, reflects on life, war, plague, and starvation. After descending the stepladder, he picks up the revolver and considers killing himself but cannot do so. Instead, he calls the Bureau of Termination to make an appointment. The story ends with the receptionist's response:

"Thank you, sir," said the hostess. "Your city thanks you; your country thanks you; your planet thanks you. But the deepest thanks of all is from all of the future generations."

== Adaptations ==
Vonnegut's story was the basis for the 2016 Canadian short film 2BR02B: To Be or Naught to Be, directed by Marco Checa Garcia, which premiered at the Sci-Fi-London festival in April 2016.
