= Kurt Vonnegut's Monkey House =

- Presented by: Kurt Vonnegut
- Composer: Doug Macaskill
- Country of origin: Canada
- Original language: English
- No. of episodes: 7

Production
- Executive producers: Michael MacMillan; Harold Lee Tichenor
- Production locations: British Columbia, Canada (1991); Auckland, New Zealand (1992)
- Running time: 30 minutes
- Production company: Alliance Atlantis

Original release
- Network: Showtime
- Release: May 12, 1991 – April 4, 1993

Kurt Vonnegut's Monkey House is a Canadian television anthology series which aired on the Showtime network from 1991 to 1993. Author Kurt Vonnegut hosted the series himself, presenting dramatizations of several of his short stories from the 1968 collection Welcome to the Monkey House.

== Episodes ==
Each Monkey House adaptation was 30 minutes long.

The first three stories were produced as a television pilot in British Columbia, Canada, and broadcast together from 9:00–10:30pm on May 12, 1991. The four subsequent episodes were filmed and produced in New Zealand in 1992, as a co-production with South Pacific Pictures. The latter episodes were broadcast monthly.

=== Season 1 ===
No. overall	No. in season	Title	Original release date
1	1	"Next Door"	May 12, 1991
2	2	"The Euphio Question"	May 12, 1991
3	3	"All The King's Horses"	May 12, 1991

=== Season 2 ===
No. overall	No. in season	Title	Original release date
4	1	"Fortitude"	21 December 1992
5	2	"More Stately Mansions"	3 January 1993
6	3	"Epicac"	21 February 1993
7	4	"The Foster Portfolio"	4 April 1993
