= Deer in the Works =

1955 short story by Kurt Vonnegut

"Deer in the Works" is a 1955 science fiction short story by American writer Kurt Vonnegut, about a newspaperman considering a career at a local industrial corporation. A film adaptation was made in 1980.

== Publication history ==
"Deer in the Works" first appeared in Esquire in April 1955, and was anthologized in Welcome to the Monkey House.

In 1980, the story was made into a short film with a running length of 25 minutes. The film stars Dennis Dugan in the lead role with supporting roles played by Gordon Jump, Bob Basso, Richard Kline and Bill Walker. The film was directed by Ron Underwood and the screenplay adaptation was written by Brent Maddock and S. S. Wilson. The film was produced by Barr Films.

== Plot ==
David Potter, owner of a weekly newspaper in a small town, decides to get a more secure job so he can support his growing family. Despite his wife's misgivings, he applies at the mammoth Ilium Works and is offered a position as a publicist. Although shaken at seeing how the company immediately plans out his entire career, he accepts the offer. He is then given his first assignment, recording the capture of a deer that has slipped onto the grounds of the Works. After he and a photographer finish their jobs, the deer will be killed and served at a company dinner.

Getting hopelessly lost on the grounds, Potter views the utter dehumanization of the workers. Mistaken for a visiting scientist, he joins a party and has several drinks before finding a skirmish line of employees closing in on the deer at the edge of a softball field. He opens a fence gate, lets the deer escape into the woods beyond, and follows it without looking back.
