= Bagombo Snuff Box =

1999 short story collection by Kurt Vonnegut

- First edition
- Author: Kurt Vonnegut
- Language: English
- Publisher: G. P. Putnam's Sons
- Publication date: August 30, 1999
- Publication place: United States
- Media type: Print
- Pages: 295
- ISBN: 0-399-14505-2
- OCLC: 40683538
- Dewey Decimal: 813/.54 21
- LC Class: PS3572.O5 B34 1999

Bagombo Snuff Box is a collection of 23 short stories written by Kurt Vonnegut. The stories were originally published in US periodicals between 1950 and 1963 and consisted of virtually all of Vonnegut's previously published short fiction of the 1950s and 1960s that had not been collected in 1968's Welcome to the Monkey House. This collection was published in 1999 by G. P. Putnam's Sons.

Vonnegut revised three stories for publication in this collection: "The Powder-Blue Dragon" (1954), "The Boy Who Hated Girls" (1956), and "Hal Irwin's Magic Lamp" (1957). The unrevised version of "Hal Irwin's Magic Lamp" was anthologized in Canary in a Cat House (1961). The final work in the collection, "Coda to My Career as a Writer for Periodicals", is an essay in which Vonnegut reflects on the writing of the stories in this collection and the person he was at the time.

The title story, "Bagombo Snuff Box", was adapted into a short film by Igor Stanojević. The film, called Čovek iz Bagomba, or The Man from Bagombo, stars Dragan Jovanović and Gala Videnović; it premiered in 2010.

== Stories ==
| № | Title | Date first published | First published in | Refs |
|---|---|---|---|---|
| 1 | "Thanasphere" | September 2, 1950 | Collier's | |
| 2 | "Mnemonics" | April 28, 1951 | Collier's | |
| 3 | "Any Reasonable Offer" | January 19, 1952 | Collier's | |
| 4 | "The Package" | July 26, 1952 | Collier's | |
| 5 | "The No-Talent Kid" | October 25, 1952 | The Saturday Evening Post | |
| 6 | "Poor Little Rich Town" | October 25, 1952 | Collier's | |
| 7 | "Souvenir" | December 1952 | Argosy | |
| 8 | "The Cruise of the Jolly Roger" | April 1953 | Cape Cod Compass | |
| 9 | "Custom-made Bride" | March 27, 1954 | The Saturday Evening Post | |
| 10 | "Ambitious Sophomore" | May 1, 1954 | The Saturday Evening Post | |
| 11 | "Bagombo Snuff Box" | October 1954 | Cosmopolitan | |
| 12 | "The Powder-Blue Dragon" | November 1954 | Cosmopolitan | |
| 13 | "A Present for Big Saint Nick" | December 1954 | Argosy | |
| 14 | "Unpaid Consultant" | March 1955 | Cosmopolitan | |
| 15 | "Der Arme Dolmetscher" | July 1955 | The Atlantic Monthly | |
| 16 | "The Boy Who Hated Girls" | March 31, 1956 | The Saturday Evening Post | |
| 17 | "This Son of Mine" | August 13, 1956 | The Saturday Evening Post | |
| 18 | "A Night for Love" | November 23, 1957 | The Saturday Evening Post | |
| 19 | "Find Me a Dream" | February 1961 | Cosmopolitan | |
| 20 | "Runaways" | April 15, 1961 | The Saturday Evening Post | |
| 21 | "2 B R 0 2 B" | January 1962 | Worlds of If | |
| 22 | "Lovers Anonymous" | October 1963 | Redbook | |
| 23 | "Hal Irwin's Magic Lamp" | June 1957 | Cosmopolitan | |
