= Armageddon in Retrospect =

2008 collection of short stories and essays by Kurt Vonnegut

- Cover of Armageddon in Retrospect
- Author: Kurt Vonnegut
- Language: English
- Genre: Fiction, Anthology
- Publisher: G. P. Putnam's Sons
- Publication date: 2008
- Publication place: US
- Pages: 234
- ISBN: 978-0-399-15508-6
- Followed by: Look at the Birdie

Armageddon in Retrospect is a collection of short stories and essays about war and peace written by Kurt Vonnegut. It is the first posthumous collection of his previously unpublished writings. The book includes an introduction by Mark Vonnegut, a letter from Kurt to his family about his experiences as an American prisoner of war in Nazi Germany, and the fire-bombing of Dresden. Like many of Vonnegut's other books, Armageddon in Retrospect is laden with handwritten quotations and rough drawings by the author.

== Contents ==
1. Vonnegut's Speech at Clowes Hall, Indianapolis, April 2007
2. Letter from PFC Kurt Vonnegut, Jr., to his family, May 29, 1945 (not included in audio edition)
3. "Wailing Shall Be in All Streets"
4. "Great Day"
5. "Guns Before Butter"
6. "Happy Birthday, 1951"
7. "Brighten Up"
8. "The Unicorn Trap"
9. "Unknown Soldier"
10. "Spoils"
11. "Just You and Me, Sammy"
12. "The Commandant's Desk"
13. "Armageddon in Retrospect"
