= Report on the Barnhouse Effect =

- Short story by Kurt Vonnegut
- Country: USA
- Language: English
- Genre: Short story

Publication
- Published in: Collier's Weekly (1st release)
- Publication type: Magazine
- Media type: Print (Periodical)
- Publication date: 1950

"Report on the Barnhouse Effect" is the first short story written and published by American writer Kurt Vonnegut. It originally appeared in the February 11, 1950 issue of Collier's Weekly. In 1952, the story was included in the science fiction anthology Tomorrow, the Stars, edited by Robert A. Heinlein. It is also part of the collection Welcome to the Monkey House, published in 1968.

The story was adapted for broadcast on NBC's Dimension X radio program. The episode first aired on April 8, 1950.

== Plot summary ==
The story takes the form of a report written by an ex-student of the story's titular character, Professor Arthur Barnhouse. A year and a half before the writing of the report, Barnhouse develops the ability to affect physical objects and events through the force of his mind; he comes to call this power "dynamopsychism", while the press adopts the term "the Barnhouse effect". When Barnhouse makes the mistake of informing the US government of his newfound abilities, they try to turn him into a weapon. During a test of his powers, he successfully destroys a fleet of bomber planes and a swarm of rockets and disables the guns on a fleet of battlships. Declaring himself the world's 'first superweapon with a conscience', Barnhouse flees and goes into hiding.

While remaining out of the public eye, Barnhouse uses his dynamopsychic powers to destroy all nuclear and conventional weapon stockpiles, along with other military technologies. Occasional rumors of his death are swiftly followed by talk of rearming nations and the resumption of warfare. The narrator realizes that the world will return to its old ways after Barnhouse dies. He receives an unsigned note one day and determines after several weeks that it was sent by Barnhouse as a set of instructions for manifesting dynamopsychism. Once the narrator discovers that he too can use the power, he goes into hiding and warns the world that the Barnhouse effect will live on even after the death of its originator.
