= Between Time and Timbuktu =

- Written by: David Odell; Kurt Vonnegut Jr.
- Directed by: Fred Barzyk
- Country of origin: United States
- Original language: English

Production
- Producer: David Loxton
- Cinematography: Boyd Estus
- Editor: Dick Bartlett
- Running time: 90 minutes

Original release
- Release: March 13, 1972

Between Time and Timbuktu is a television film directed by Fred Barzyk and based on a number of works by Kurt Vonnegut. Produced by National Educational Television and WGBH-TV in Boston, Massachusetts, it was telecast March 13, 1972 as a NET Playhouse special. The television script was also published in book form in 1972, illustrated with photographs by Jill Krementz and stills from the production.

The first draft of the script was written by David Odell, with contributions from Bob Elliott and Ray Goulding, and the film's director. Vonnegut himself served as an "advisor and contributor to the script." The primary title refers to a collection of poetry written by one of the main characters in Vonnegut's second novel, The Sirens of Titan.

== Plot ==
Stony Stevenson, a young poet living with his mother, receives notice on nation-wide TV that he has won the grand prize in the Blast-Off Space Food jingle contest. The prize is a trip on the Prometheus-5 rocket into the Chrono-Synclastic Infundibulum. TV reporter Walter Gesundheit and ex-astronaut Bud Williams, Jr. explain that Stevenson was chosen for this mission because it is believed that only a poet could find the words to describe the Chrono-Synclastic Infundibulum, a type of time warp, which may hold the answer to all creation. Bud Williams, Jr. recalls that he had trouble describing Mars, comparing it to his driveway back home.

- On the island of San Lorenzo, he meets Bokonon (Cat's Cradle), leader of a religious cult, who has given his followers a religion of harmless lies because the truth of their lives is so difficult.
- He appears among jurors at the trial of Dr. Paul Proteus (Player Piano), who is accused of waging war against modern technology and the industrial system.
- He finds himself with Dr. Hoenikker (Cat's Cradle) and a General who discuss the military application of Ice Nine, which could freeze all water on a battlefield so soldiers would never have to fight in mud.
- He lands in a society where no one is allowed to be superior to anyone else. He sees dancers hobbled with weights struggling to perform a ballet until one dancer ("Harrison Bergeron") rebels by removing the handicaps from himself and his partner so they can dance freely.
- He visits an Ethical Suicide Parlor in an overpopulated world ("Welcome to the Monkey House") and meets Lionel J. Howard who wants to know one thing before he dies: "What are people for?"
- In the final episode, he hitches a ride on a fire truck with a young girl, Wanda June, who was hit by an ice-cream truck before her birthday party (Happy Birthday, Wanda June), and confronts his own death.

== Cast ==
The televised production of the play starred William Hickey as Stony Stevenson. The rest of the cast included:

- Bruce Morrow as Contest Announcer
- Dortha Duckworth as Mrs. Stevenson (Stony's mother)
- Ray Goulding as Walter Gesundheit
- Bob Elliott as Bud Williams, Jr. (the ex-astronaut)
- Franklin Cover as Col. Donald "Tex" Pirandello
- Russell Morash as Sandy Abernethy
- John Devlin as Dr. Bobby Denton
- Kevin McCarthy as Bokonon
- Edie Lynch as Island Girl
- Jerry Gershman as Soldier
- James Sloyan as Dr. Paul Proteus
- George Serries as Prosecutor
- Ashley Westcott as Deaf Juror
- John Peters as Drunk
- Helen Stenborg as Miss Martin
- Hurd Hatfield as Dr. Hoenikker
- Dolph Sweet as General
- Hariet Hamilton as Lead Caroler
- Sam Amato as Policeman
- Benay Venuta as Diana Moon Glampers
- Carlton Power as First Stagehand
- Jean Sanocki as Larry
- Jack Shipley as News Announcer
- Alexis Hoff as Ballerina
- Avind Haerum as Harrison Bergeron
- Frank Dolan as Short Order Cook
- Susan Sullivan as Nancy
- Charles White as Lionel J. Howard
- Philip Bruns as Announcer
- Ariane Munker as Wanda June
- Page Johnson as Hitler
- MacIntyre Dixon as Cemetery Gardener

== See also ==
- List of American films of 1972
