= All the King's Horses (short story) =

1968 short story by Kurt Vonnegut

- Short story by Kurt Vonnegut
- Country: USA
- Language: English
- Genres: Psychological thriller, short story

Publication
- Published in: Welcome to the Monkey House
- Publication type: Anthology
- Publisher: Delacorte Press
- Media type: Print (Paperback)
- Publication date: 1968

"All the King's Horses" is a short story written in or before 1951 by Kurt Vonnegut. It can be found in his 1968 collection of short stories Welcome to the Monkey House. It derives its title from a line in the Humpty Dumpty nursery rhyme.

== Plot summary ==
The story takes place in the early years of the Cold War and centers on U.S. Army Colonel Bryan Kelly, whose plane has crash-landed on the Asiatic mainland. With him are his two sons, his wife, the pilot and co-pilot, and ten enlisted men. The sixteen prisoners are held captive by the Communist guerrilla chief Pi Ying, who forces Kelly to play a game of chess using his family and men as the white pieces, and himself as the king. Any American pieces that Pi Ying captures will be executed immediately; if Kelly wins, he and his surviving pieces will be freed. A Russian military officer, Major Barzov, and Pi Ying's female companion are present to watch the game.

Pi Ying takes a sadistic pleasure in pointless exchanges of pieces meant to wear down Kelly, who begins to doubt himself over every move he makes. Eventually, he realizes that his only chance to win involves sacrificing one of his knights, played by his sons. Pi Ying captures the piece; before he can order the boy's execution, though, his companion stabs him and herself to death. Barzov then takes over for Pi Ying, but is defeated by Kelly's trap. He spares the captured son's life and offers to transport the twelve surviving group members to safety, saying that since the United States and USSR are not officially at war, he would have let them go even if Kelly had lost. Not wanting Kelly to leave thinking he is a better chess player, Barzov suggests a rematch with no lives at stake. Kelly declines, but says he will play at a later time if Barzov insists on it.
