= Look at the Birdie =

2009 collection of short stories by Kurt Vonnegut

- Cover of Look at the Birdie
- Author: Kurt Vonnegut
- Language: English
- Genre: Fiction, anthology
- Publisher: Delacorte Press
- Publication date: 2009
- Publication place: United States
- Pages: 256
- ISBN: 978-0-385-34371-8

Look at the Birdie is a collection of fourteen previously unpublished short stories by Kurt Vonnegut, released on October 20, 2009. It is the second posthumously published Kurt Vonnegut book, the first being Armageddon in Retrospect.

== Contents ==
1. Letter from Kurt Vonnegut, Jr., to Walter J. Miller, 1951.
2. "Confido"
3. "F U B A R"
4. "Shout About It from the Housetops"
5. "Ed Luby's Key Club"
6. "A Song for Selma"
7. "Hall of Mirrors"
8. "The Nice Little People"
9. "Hello, Red"
10. "Little Drops of Water"
11. "The Petrified Ants"
12. "The Honor of a Newsboy"
13. "Look at the Birdie"
14. "King and Queen of the Universe"
15. "The Good Explainer"
