= Welcome to the Monkey House =

1968 collection of short stories by Kurt Vonnegut

- First edition cover
- Author: Kurt Vonnegut
- Language: English
- Genre: Speculative fiction • literary fiction
- Publisher: Delacorte Press
- Publication date: 1968
- Publication place: United States
- Media type: Print
- Pages: 352 pp
- ISBN: 0-385-33350-1

Welcome to the Monkey House is a collection of 25 short stories written by Kurt Vonnegut, published by Delacorte in August 1968. The stories range from wartime epics to futuristic thrillers, given with satire and Vonnegut's unique edge. The stories are often intertwined and convey the same underlying messages on human nature and mid-twentieth century society.

== Contents ==
- "Where I Live" (Venture- Traveler's World, October 1964)
- "Harrison Bergeron" (The Magazine of Fantasy and Science Fiction, October 1961)
- "Who Am I This Time?" (The Saturday Evening Post, December 16, 1961)
- "Welcome to the Monkey House" (Playboy, January 1968)
- "Long Walk to Forever" (Ladies' Home Journal, August 1960)
- "The Foster Portfolio" (Collier's Magazine, September 8, 1951)
- "Miss Temptation" (The Saturday Evening Post, April 21, 1956)
- "All the King's Horses" (Collier's Magazine, February 10, 1951)
- "Tom Edison's Shaggy Dog" (Collier's Magazine, March 14, 1953)
- "New Dictionary" (The New York Times, October 1966)
- "Next Door" (Cosmopolitan, April 1955)
- "More Stately Mansions" (Collier's Magazine, December 22, 1951)
- "The Hyannis Port Story" (Set to be published in The Saturday Evening Post, it was removed when John F Kennedy was assassinated)
- "D.P." (Ladies' Home Journal, August 1953)
- "Report on the Barnhouse Effect" (Collier's Magazine, February 11, 1950)
- "The Euphio Question" (Collier's Magazine, May 12, 1951)
- "Go Back to Your Precious Wife and Son" (Ladies' Home Journal, July 1962)
- "Deer in the Works" (Esquire, April 1955)
- "The Lie" (The Saturday Evening Post February 24, 1962)
- "Unready to Wear" (Galaxy Science Fiction, April 1953)
- "The Kid Nobody Could Handle" (The Saturday Evening Post, September 24, 1955)
- "The Manned Missiles" (Cosmopolitan, July 1958)
- "EPICAC" (Collier's Magazine, November 25, 1950)
- "Adam" (Cosmopolitan, April 1954)
- "Tomorrow and Tomorrow and Tomorrow" (Galaxy Science Fiction, January 1954)

The story "Der Arme Dolmetscher" is listed in the book's copyright notice as being included in this collection, but it was ultimately omitted, and does not appear in any edition of Welcome To The Monkey House. It does appear in Vonnegut's later collection Bagombo Snuff Box.

== Adaptations in other media ==
In 1970, Christopher Sergel adapted the collection of stories into a play, also called Welcome to the Monkey House. The play was staged at Carolina Actors Studio Theatre in 2010. In 1991, a short-lived television series titled Kurt Vonnegut's Monkey House aired on the United States Showtime channel. It was based on Vonnegut's stories and hosted by Vonnegut himself.

"Who Am I This Time?" was made into a 53-minute television movie in 1982 starring Christopher Walken and Susan Sarandon and directed by Jonathan Demme.

The story "D.P." has been adapted to screen twice. Vonnegut co-wrote the first adaptation, "Auf Wiedersehen", which aired on October 5, 1958, as part of the Ronald Reagan-hosted television anthology series General Electric Theater. The episode starred Sammy Davis Jr. The second adaptation, "Displaced Person", aired on May 6, 1985, as part of the television anthology series American Playhouse, meeting with critical success. The episode was directed by Alan Bridges and starred Stan Shaw, and won an Emmy for "Outstanding Children's program" for its producers, including Barry Levinson.

"Deer in the Works" was made into a 25-minute short film in 1980 by Barr Films. It starred Dennis Dugan as David Potter as well as a cast that included Richard Kline, Gordon Jump, Bob Basso and Bill Walker. It was written by Brent Maddock and S. S. Wilson and directed by Ron Underwood.

== References in popular culture ==
- "Happiness By The Kilowatt", a song by Canadian post-hardcore band Alexisonfire, makes several references to "The Euphio Question".
- The Philadelphia-area based hardcore/post-hardcore band This Day Forward included a mostly instrumental song called "Euphio Question" on their 2003 release In Response.
- American hardcore band Snapcase has a song titled "Harrison Bergeron" on their 1997 album Progression Through Unlearning.
- American rock band The Dandy Warhols's fourth studio album is called Welcome to the Monkey House.
- The character Mae rather appropriately picks up a copy of "Welcome to the Monkey House" in the film Kingdom of the Planet of the Apes

== Other short story collections ==
- This collection includes all but one of the twelve stories in Vonnegut's previous short story collection Canary in a Cat House, published in 1961.
- Other short stories Vonnegut wrote during the same time period are collected in a second anthology, Bagombo Snuff Box, published in 1999.
