= Phil Hanley =

Canadian comedian and actor

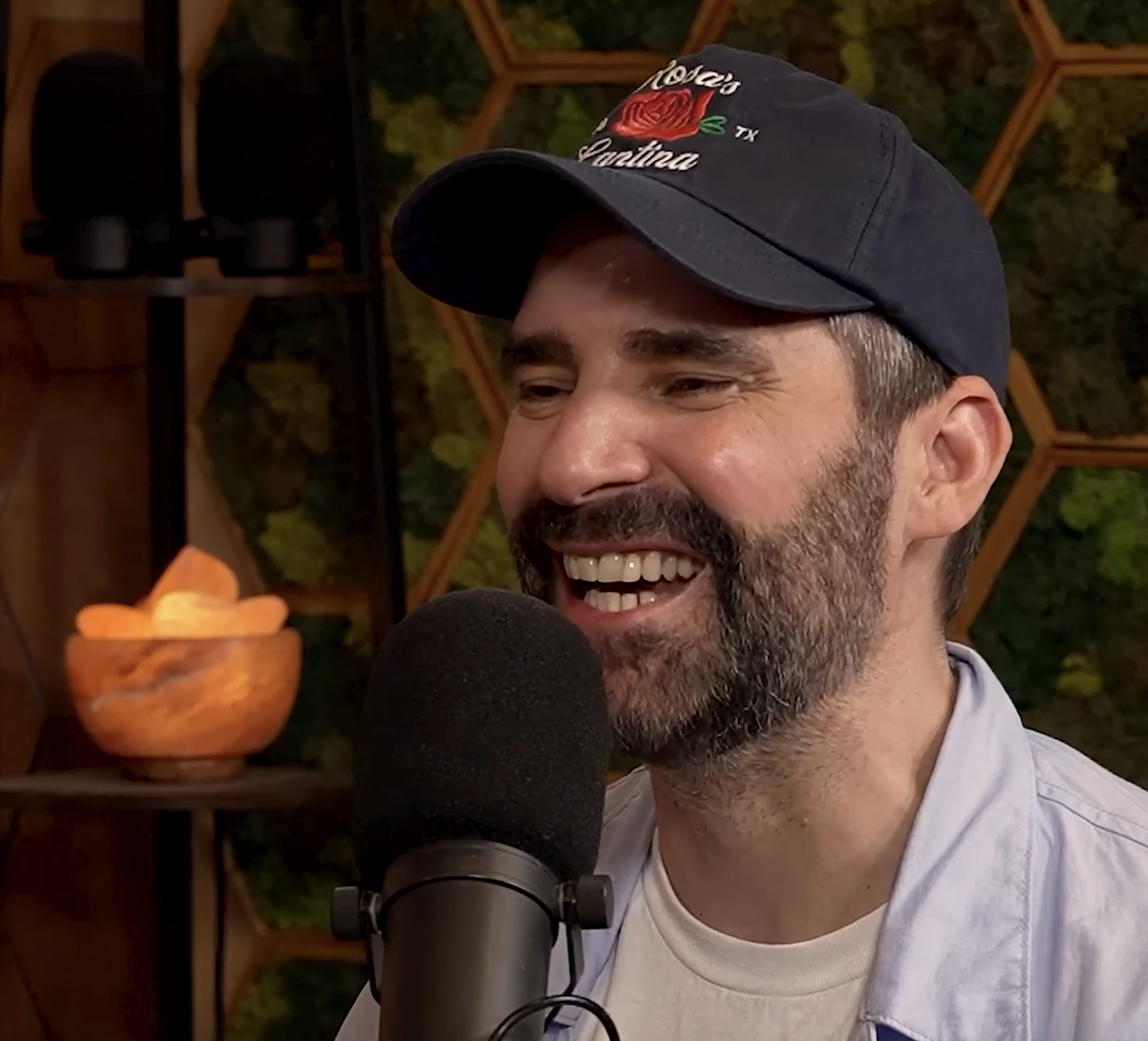
- Hanley in 2026
- Born: Canada

Comedy career
- Medium: Stand-up; film; television

Phil Hanley is a Canadian stand-up comedian and actor. He had a half-hour special on Comedy Central in 2015 and released an hour-long stand-up special Ooh La La on his YouTube channel in 2022. Time Out described him as a "master of crowdwork".

== Early life ==
Phil Hanley was raised in Oshawa, Ontario. He was diagnosed with dyslexia at age 10 and used comedy as a way to cope with his learning disability. He moved to Vancouver in 2003.

== Career ==
Prior to performing stand-up, Hanley worked as a model in New York and Europe for clients such as Giorgio Armani, Levi's, Fred Perry, and British GQ. After improvising on the set of a car commercial, he took an improv class in England and then tried improv comedy, including at the Vancouver TheatreSports League and the Upright Citizens Brigade in New York.

He moved back to Vancouver and started performing stand-up, giving up on improv. He found that he liked the control and preparation that went into stand-up as opposed to improv. Eventually he was touring festivals in Canada and appeared on national TV and radio. He had his first screenwriting credit for the 2006 film Air Buddies.

Hanley moved to New York in 2011 and became a regular at the Comedy Cellar. He made his U.S. network debut on The Late Late Show with Craig Ferguson in March of that year. He appeared on season four of John Oliver's New York Stand-Up Show in 2013. From 2014 to 2016, he hosted the We Know Nothing podcast with Anya Marina and Sam Morril. In 2015, he had a half-hour special released on Comedy Central. He also hosted Time Out's first New York Comedy Showcase.

Hanley starred in the comedy film Sundowners in 2017. The film was written and directed by Pavan Moondi and also starred Tim Heidecker and Luke Lalonde. Prior to the role, Hanley had no acting experience. From 2017 to 2020, he hosted the podcast Keeping Joe with Sam Morril and Joe Machi.

In 2018, Hanley released a comedy album, Please Don't Chit Chat While I'm Pursuing My Dream. Hanley also appeared in I Feel Pretty, starring Amy Schumer. He had previously worked with Schumer on her series Inside Amy Schumer. In 2022, Hanley released his first hour-long stand-up special, Ooh La La on his YouTube channel.

In March 2025, Hanley published his first book entitled Spellbound: My Life as a Dyslexic Wordsmith.

== Reception ==
His stand-up performances feature extensive audience interaction, and Time Out described him as a "master of crowdwork". In 2015, the wife of a heckler rushed the stage at one of his performances and had to be removed by the bouncers. Vulture described his joke delivery as having a "cool, collected pacing". The Georgia Straight describe his stage presence as portraying a "nebbishy persona with a misplaced confidence".

== Personal life ==
Hanley is an ambassador for organizations that address learning disabilities, including Eye to Eye, Dyslexia Canada, and Choose Your Own ADDventure.

Hanley is a fan of The Grateful Dead.

== Filmography ==
=== Films ===
Year	Title	Role	Notes
2006	Air Buddies		Writer
2017	Sundowners	Alex Hopper	
2018	I Feel Pretty	Group date #3	

=== Television ===
Year	Title	Role	Notes
2015–2022	Inside Amy Schumer	Karl, father	2 episodes

=== Stand-up ===
Year	Title	Notes
2015	The Half Hour	Comedy Central special
2022	Ooh La La	YouTube special
