= Bokonon =

Bokonon may refer to:

- Bokonon, a character in the book Cat's Cradle
- Bokonon (Fon), a priest among the Fon people
