= The Mohawk Lodge =

Canadian musical group

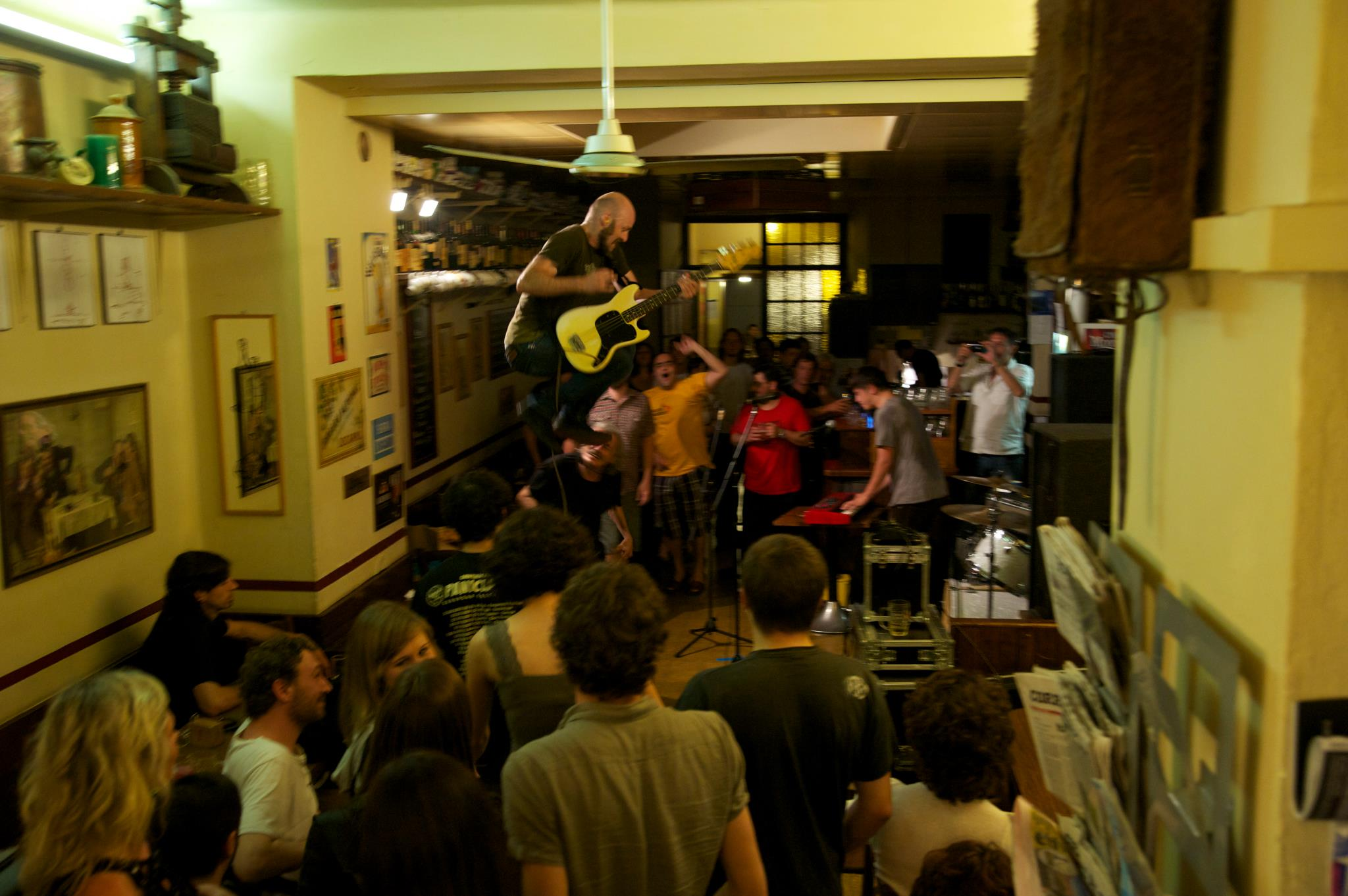
- Performing in Locarno, Switzerland, 2010

Background information
- Origin: Vancouver, British Columbia
- Genres: Indie rock
- Years active: 2003–present
- Labels: White Whale Records; First Love Records
- Members: Ryder Havdale; Danny Miles (drums); Clay Jones (bass); Scott Freeman (bass/vox); Arch (guitar/vox); Cory Price (guitar/vox); Paul Goertzen (bass); Samir Mallal (bass); Kemal Sev (bass); Rob Josephson (drums); Josh Lindstrom (drums); Jon Pearce (guitar/vox); Matt Godin (drums); Eamon McGrath (guitar)
- Website: The Mohawk Lodge

The Mohawk Lodge is a Canadian indie rock group, fronted by singer and songwriter Ryder Havdale, who tours with different collaborators and guests.

Formerly based in Vancouver, British Columbia, the band was formed in the early 2000s as a side project for songs Havdale did not feel fit with his other bands, Kids These Days and Second Narrows. Their first album, Rare Birds, was released in 2004 on Havdale's own label, White Whale Records. The Mohawk Lodge subsequently became Havdale's primary project after the earlier bands broke up, and followed up with Wildfires in 2007.

Havdale relocated to Toronto, Ontario, in 2008. The band's third album, Crimes, followed in 2010, and was supported by two European tours with Toronto's Eamon McGrath who also played lead guitar for Havdale in the 2010 incarnation of the band. Other members on those tours included Peter Dreimanis and Danny Miles of July Talk, Tim McCready, Lee Klippenstein of Slates, and Rob Josephson who also formerly played with Havdale in Kids These Days.

2011 began the recording of the follow-up to Crimes, entitled Damaged Goods, which was self-recorded in Havdale's Toronto Bloor Street apartment and featured songs that were written and arranged on the 2010 European tours. The album was released in Canada on Havdale's own White Whale imprint and in Australia on First Love Records.

Inspired by the frequent visits to Europe, Havdale uprooted to Berlin in early 2012 where he lived at the famous Schokoladen squat in Mitte and focused on an international touring schedule which took him to the US, Canada, the UK, Australia and across Europe until the end of 2013. In 2013 the Mohawk Lodge played nearly 100 shows and continued to commit to the fierce DIY ethic that Havdale has commonly espoused.

Although historically the Mohawk Lodge has been a primarily guitar-driven group, citing Swervedriver and Neil Young as influences, Havdale hinted in 2013 that upcoming music would feature a more electronic influence and make use of "drum machines and synths".

== Discography ==
- Rare Birds (2004)
- Wildfires (2007)
- Crimes (2010)
- Damaged Goods (2012)
