= Cat's Cradle =

1963 novel by Kurt Vonnegut

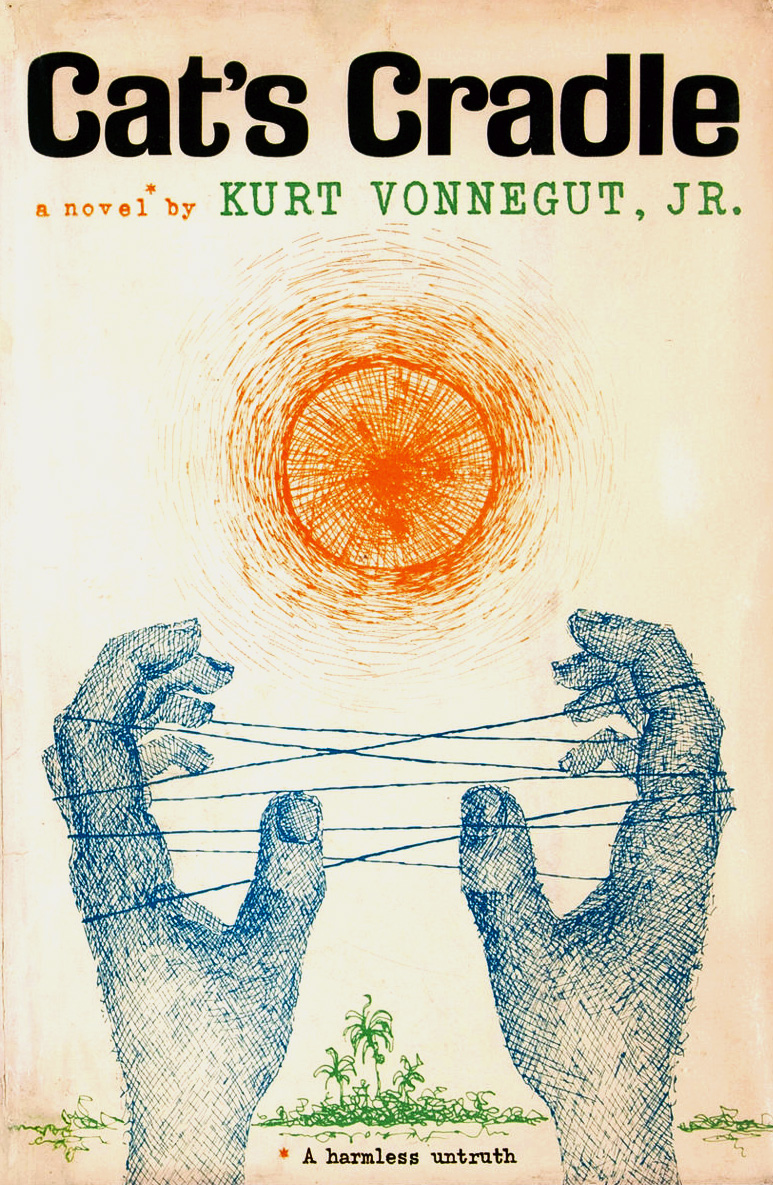
- First edition hardback cover
- Author: Kurt Vonnegut
- Original title: Cat's Cradle
- Language: English
- Genre: Satire, science fiction
- Publisher: Holt, Rinehart and Winston
- Publication date: March 18, 1963
- Publication place: United States
- Media type: Print (hardcover and paperback)
- Pages: 304
- ISBN: 0-385-33348-X
- OCLC: 40067116
- LC Class: PS3572.O5

Cat's Cradle is a satirical postmodern novel, with science fiction elements, by American writer Kurt Vonnegut. Vonnegut's fourth novel, it was first published on March 18, 1963, exploring and satirizing issues of science, technology, the purpose of religion, and the arms race, often through the use of morbid humor. The novel was nominated for the Hugo Award for Best Novel in 1964.

== Synopsis ==
=== Background ===
The first-person everyman narrator opens the novel with "Call me Jonah. My parents did, or nearly did. They called me John," though neither name appears again throughout the novel. The narrator is a professional writer who frames the plot as a flashback set in the mid-20th century, when he was planning to write a book called The Day the World Ended. He describes his concept for that book as an account of what people were doing on the day of the atomic bombing of Hiroshima. Throughout, he also intersperses meaningful as well as sarcastic passages and sentiments from an odd religious scripture known as The Books of Bokonon. Most of the events of the novel occur before the narrator was converted to his current religion, Bokononism.

=== Plot summary ===
While researching for his upcoming book, the narrator writes a letter to Newt Hoenikker, the younger son of the late Felix Hoenikker, a co-creator of the atomic bomb and Nobel laureate physicist, asking Newt to describe what he remembers about the day when the first bomb was dropped. Newt recounts that his father was doing nothing more than playing the string game "cat's cradle." About a year later, the narrator travels to (fictional) Ilium, New York to interview Felix Hoenikker's coworkers and other acquaintances. There, he learns of a substance called ice-nine, conceptualised for military use by Hoenikker and unbeknownst to the narrator, currently in the possession of his three adult children. Ice-nine is an alternative structure of water that is solid at room temperature and acts as a seed crystal upon contact with ordinary liquid water, causing that liquid water to instantly freeze and transform into more ice-nine.

Eventually, a magazine assignment takes the narrator to the (fictional) Caribbean island of San Lorenzo, one of the poorest countries on Earth. On the plane ride, the narrator is surprised to meet Newt and Angela, Felix's only daughter. He also meets the newly appointed US ambassador to San Lorenzo, who provides a comprehensive guidebook on San Lorenzo's unusual culture and history. The guidebook describes a locally influential semi-parody religious movement called Bokononism, which combines irreverent, nihilistic, and cynical observations about life and God's will; an emphasis on coincidences and serendipity; and both thoughtful and humorous sayings and rituals into a holy text called The Books of Bokonon. Bokonon, the religion's founder, was a former leader of the island who created Bokononism as part of a utopian project to give people purpose and community in the face of the island's unsolvable poverty and squalor. As a deliberate attempt to give Bokononism an alluring sense of forbidden glamor and hope, the religion is nominally outlawed, which forced Bokonon to live in "hiding" in the jungle. The current dictator, "Papa" Monzano, threatens all Bokononists with impalement on a large hook. Intrigued by Bokononism, the narrator later discovers the strange reality that nearly all residents of San Lorenzo, even including "Papa" Monzano himself, practice it in secret, and punishment by the hook is, in actuality, quite rare.

On San Lorenzo, the plane passengers are greeted by "Papa" Monzano, his beautiful adopted daughter Mona (whom the narrator intensely lusts after), and a crowd of some five thousand San Lorenzans. Monzano is ill from cancer and wants his successor to be Frank Hoenikker: Monzano's personal bodyguard and, coincidentally, Felix Hoenikker's other son. Frank achieved this position by giving "Papa" Monzano a piece of ice-nine. However, Frank, uncomfortable with leading, confronts the narrator in private and somewhat randomly offers him the presidency. Startled at first, the narrator grudgingly accepts after he is promised the beautiful Mona for his bride. Newt reiterates the idea of the cat's cradle, implying that the game, with its invisible cat, is an appropriate symbol for the meaninglessness of life. Soon after, the bedridden "Papa" Monzano takes his own life by swallowing ice-nine, whereupon his corpse instantly turns into solid ice-nine. Frank Hoenikker admits to giving Monzano ice-nine, and the Hoenikkers explain that when they were young their father would give them hints about the existence of ice-nine while experimenting with it in the kitchen. After their father's death, they gathered chunks of the substance into thermos flasks and have kept them ever since.

Festivities for the narrator's presidential inauguration begin, but during an air show performed by San Lorenzo's fighter planes, one of the planes malfunctions and crashes into the seaside palace, causing Monzano's still-frozen body to fall into the sea. Instantly, all the water in the world's seas, rivers, and groundwater transforms into solid ice-nine. The freezing of the world's oceans immediately causes violent tornadoes to ravage the Earth, but the narrator manages to escape with Mona to a secret bunker beneath the palace. When the initial storms subside after several days, they emerge. Exploring the island for survivors, they discover a mass grave where all the surviving San Lorenzans died by suicide via touching ice-nine from the landscape to their mouths on the facetious advice of Bokonon, who has left a note of explanation. Displaying a mix of grief for her people and resigned amusement, Mona promptly follows suit and dies.

The horrified narrator is discovered by a few other survivors, including Newt and Frank Hoenikker, and he lives with them in a cave for several months, during which time he writes the contents of the book. Driving through the barren wasteland one day, he spots Bokonon himself, who is contemplating what the last words of The Books of Bokonon should be. Bokonon states that if he were younger, he would place a book about human stupidity on the peak of San Lorenzo's highest mountain, rest his head on it, swallow ice-nine, and die while thumbing his nose at God. (The implication is that Jonah, the narrator, followed Bokonon's direction and has died on Mount McCabe with the novel itself as his pillow.)

== Themes ==
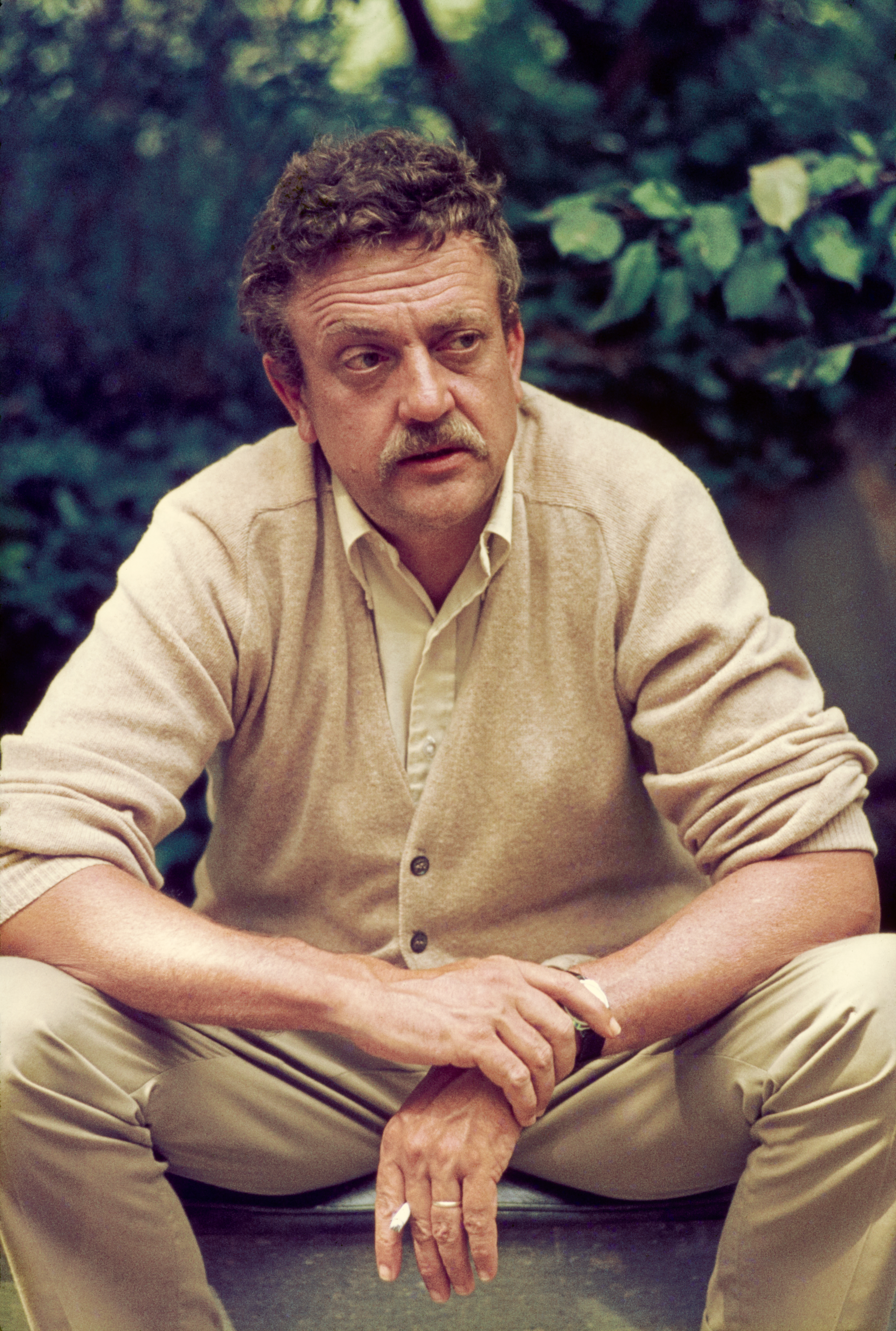
A 1965 photograph of Vonnegut by Bernard Gotfryd

Many of Vonnegut's recurring themes are prevalent in Cat's Cradle, most notably the issues of free will and man's relation to technology. The former is embodied in the creation of Bokononism, an artificial religion created to make life bearable to the beleaguered inhabitants of San Lorenzo through acceptance and delight in the inevitability of everything that happens. The latter is demonstrated by the development and exploitation of ice-nine, which is conceived with indifference but is misused to disastrous ends. In his 1969 address to the American Physical Society, Vonnegut describes the inspiration behind ice-nine and its creator as the type of "old-fashioned scientist who isn't interested in people," and draws connections to nuclear weapons.

More topically, Cat's Cradle takes the threat of nuclear destruction in the Cold War as a major theme. The Cuban Missile Crisis, in which world powers collided around a small Caribbean island, bringing the world to the brink of mutual assured destruction, occurred in 1962, and much of the novel can be seen as allegorical.

== Style ==
Like most of Vonnegut's work, irony, morbid humor, and parody are used heavily throughout. Cat's Cradle, despite its relatively short length, contains 127 discrete chapters, some of which are verses from the Book of Bokonon. Vonnegut himself claimed that his books "are essentially mosaics made up of a whole bunch of tiny little chips... and each chip is a joke."

== Background ==
After World War II, Kurt Vonnegut worked in the public relations department for General Electric research company. GE hired scientists and let them do pure research, and his job was to interview these scientists and find good stories about their research. Vonnegut felt that the older scientists were indifferent about the ways their discoveries might be used. When science fiction author H. G. Wells visited the labs in the 1930s, the Nobel Prize-winning chemist Irving Langmuir suggested to him the idea of a story about a form of ice stable at room temperature. Wells never took it any further, but Vonnegut's older brother Bernard, who was Langmuir's junior colleague at GE, remembered and told him about it. After both the author and the scientist had died, Vonnegut thought to himself "Finders, keepers – the idea is mine." Langmuir himself would become the model for Dr. Felix Hoenikker. Vonnegut said in an interview with The Nation that "Langmuir was absolutely indifferent to the uses that might be made of the truths he dug out of the rock and handed out to whoever was around, but any truth he found was beautiful in its own right, and he didn't give a damn who got it next." Dr. Felix Hoenikker's fictional invention of ice-nine was similar in name only to the real substance Ice IX, one of a number of variant structures for ice. Langmuir had worked on seeding ice crystals to diminish or increase rain or storms.

=== Setting ===
San Lorenzo
- Cat's Cradle location
- General location of San Lorenzo

- Flag of San Lorenzo
- Created by: Kurt Vonnegut
- Genre: Satire

In-universe information
- Other name: Republic of San Lorenzo
- Type: Dictatorship
- Ruled by: "Papa" Monzano
- Locations: Bolivar (capital)
- Anthem: San Lorenzan National Anthem
- Language(s): San Lorenzan dialect of English
- Currency: Corporal

The Republic of San Lorenzo is a fictional country where much of the book's second half takes place.

San Lorenzo is a tiny, rocky island nation located in the Caribbean Sea, positioned in the relative vicinity of Puerto Rico. San Lorenzo has only one city, its seaside capital of Bolivar. The country's form of government is a dictatorship, under the rule of ailing president "Papa" Monzano, who is a staunch ally of the United States and a fierce opponent of communism. No legislature exists. The infrastructure of San Lorenzo is described as being dilapidated, consisting of worn buildings, dirt roads, an impoverished populace, and having only one working automobile taxi in the entire country.

The language of San Lorenzo is a fictitious English-based creole language (for example "twinkle, twinkle, little star" is rendered "tsvent-kiul, tsvent-kiul, lett-pool store") that is referred to as "the San Lorenzan dialect." The San Lorenzan national anthem is based on the tune of Home on the Range. Its flag consists of a U.S. Marine Corps corporal's chevrons on a blue field (presumably the flag was updated, since in the 1920s Marine Corps rank insignia did not include crossed rifles). Its currency is named the corporal, at a rate of two corporals for every United States dollar; both the flag and the monetary unit are named after U.S. Marine Corporal Earl McCabe, who deserted his company while stationed at Port-au-Prince during the American occupation in 1922, and in transit to Miami, was shipwrecked on San Lorenzo. McCabe, along with accomplice Lionel Boyd Johnson from Tobago, together threw out the island's governing sugar company and, after a period of anarchy, proclaimed a republic.

San Lorenzo also has its own native religion, Bokononism, a religion based on enjoying life through believing "foma" (harmless lies), and taking encouragement where you can. Bokononism, founded by McCabe's accomplice Boyd Johnson (pronounced "Bokonon" in San Lorenzan dialect), however, is outlawed – an idea Bokonon himself conceived, because forbidding the religion would only make it spread quicker. Bokononists are liable to be punished by being impaled on a hook, but Bokononism privately remains the dominant religion of nearly everyone on the island, including the leaders who outlaw it. Officially, however, San Lorenzo is a Christian nation.

== Characters ==
- The narrator is a writer who claims his parents named him John but begins the book by stating "Call me Jonah," alluding to the first line of Herman Melville's Moby-Dick ("Call me Ishmael"), offering a parallel between Moby-Dick and the biblical Jonah's interaction with the large fish. Beyond the first page, neither name is mentioned again. He describes the events in the book with humorous and sarcastic detail. While writing a book about the day of the atomic bombing of Hiroshima, he becomes involved with the Hoenikker children. Eventually, he is offered the presidency of San Lorenzo by Franklin Hoenikker.
- Felix Hoenikker is the "Father of the Atom Bomb" and an unseen character who died many years before the novel's plot begins. Felix Hoenikker was proclaimed one of the smartest scientists on Earth. An eccentric and emotionless man, he is depicted as amoral and apathetic towards anything other than his research. He needed only something to keep him busy, such as in his role as one of the "Fathers of the Atomic Bomb," and in his creation of "ice-nine," a potentially catastrophic substance with the capability to destroy all life on Earth, but which he saw merely as a mental puzzle (a Marine general suggested developing a substance that could solidify mud so that soldiers could run across it more easily). While experimenting with "ice-nine" in his home at Cape Cod, Felix is said to have taken a nap in his rocking chair and died. It was later revealed that he was actually the first to be killed by ice-nine, being turned into a frozen statue. The narrator's quest for biographical details about Hoenikker provides both the background and the connecting thread between the various subsections of the story.
- Emily Hoenikker was the wife of Felix, and mother to Frank, Angela, and Newt. She died in childbirth with the latter. According to Dr. Asa Breed, a former lover of Emily's, the complications at Newt's birth were the result of a pelvic injury she sustained in a car accident some time before.
- Dr. Asa Breed is Felix Hoenikker's former supervisor. He takes the narrator around Illium and to the General Forge and Foundry Company where the late Felix worked. Later in the tour, Dr. Breed becomes upset with the narrator for misrepresenting scientists.
- Marvin Breed is Asa Breed's brother. He owned and operated the tombstone shop in the city where Felix Hoenikker worked on the atomic bomb. Here, the narrator is shocked to find a tombstone with his own last name on it.
- Newton "Newt" Hoenikker: The dwarf ("midget") son of famed scientist Felix Hoenikker, and a painter. He is the brother of both Frank and Angela Hoenikker. His main hobby is painting minimalist abstract works. He briefly had an affair with a Ukrainian dwarf dancer named Zinka, who turned out to be a KGB agent sent to steal ice-nine for the Soviet Union.
- Franklin "Frank" Hoenikker is Felix Hoenikker's older son, and a Major General in San Lorenzo. He is the brother of Newt and Angela Hoenikker. He is an utterly technically minded person who is unable to make decisions except for giving technical advice. His main hobby is building models. Expected to take over for "Papa" Monzano after his death, he anxiously hands the presidency over to the narrator instead.
- Angela Hoenikker Conners is Felix Hoenikker's daughter and a clarinetist. She is the married sister of Frank and Newt Hoenikker. In contrast to her dwarf brother, Angela is unusually tall for a woman. She used to take care of her father after her mother's death and acts as a mother figure to Newt. She and her brothers all have samples of ice-nine, which they found along with their father's body, dead in his chair. It is implied that she used ice-nine to bargain a marriage with her husband. She dies when she blows on a clarinet contaminated with ice-nine after the apocalyptic event at the end of the novel.
- Bokonon (birth name Lionel Boyd Johnson) co-founded San Lorenzo as a republic, along with Earl McCabe (a now-dead US Marine deserter), and created the religion of Bokononism, which he asked McCabe to outlaw in order to give it an alluringly forbidden sense of mystery, giving some meaning to the miserable lives of San Lorenzo's extremely impoverished citizens. He therefore has lived for years in exile somewhere in San Lorenzo's jungles. He only appears once in the novel in person: in the very final chapter.
- "Papa" Monzano is the ailing dictator of San Lorenzo. He was once Earl McCabe's right-hand man and chosen successor. He appoints Frank Hoenikker as his own successor, and then commits suicide with a piece of ice-nine. He is the adopted father of Mona Monzano.
- Mona Aamons Monzano is the 18-year-old adopted daughter of "Papa" Monzano. A gorgeous black girl with blond hair due to her Finnish biological father, her adoption was a political ploy to integrate different races under Monzano's rule and provide a beloved poster child for his regime. The narrator describes her as "the only beautiful woman on San Lorenzo." She is expected to marry Monzano's successor, and she therefore agrees to marry the narrator before the disaster at the end of the novel.
- Julian Castle is the multi-millionaire ex-owner of Castle Sugar Cooperation, whom the narrator travels to San Lorenzo to interview for a magazine. He eventually changed his outlook in life, abandoning his business ventures to set up and operate a humanitarian hospital in the jungle of San Lorenzo.
- H. Lowe Crosby is a fervently pro-American bicycle manufacturer the narrator meets on his plane ride to San Lorenzo. His main goal is to move his American factory to San Lorenzo, so he can run it with cheap labor.
- Hazel Crosby is married to H. Lowe Crosby, a Hoosier who believes in some cosmic fraternity among Hoosiers and asks all Hoosiers she meets around the globe to call her "Mom."
- Philip Castle is the son of Julian Castle, and the operator of a hotel on San Lorenzo. He also wrote a history of San Lorenzo that the narrator reads on his flight to the island. Bokonon taught both him and Mona when they were young students. Through reading the index of Castle's book, Claire Minton deduces that he's a homosexual.
- Horlick Minton is the new American ambassador to San Lorenzo, whom the narrator meets on his plane ride. He was blacklisted as a Communist sympathizer during the McCarthy era.
- Claire Minton is a writer of book indexes. She is so well versed at indexing that she even claims to be able to deduce strange knowledge about writers based on reading their indexes. She is married to the new American ambassador to San Lorenzo. She and her husband are extremely close, forming what the narrator calls a duprass.

== Bokononism ==
The semi-humorous religion secretly practiced by the people of San Lorenzo, and called Bokononism, encompasses concepts unique to the novel. Many of these concepts use words from the San Lorenzan creole "dialect" of English. Assumed within the religion is the presence of God, who evidently works in mysterious ways. Many of its sacred texts, collectively called The Books of Bokonon, are written in the form of calypso songs. Bokononist rituals are equally strange or absurdist; for example, the supreme religious act consists of any two worshippers rubbing the bare soles of their feet together to inspire spiritual connection.

Bokononist terms include:

- karass – A group of people linked in a cosmically significant manner, even when superficial linkages are not evident.
- duprass – a karass of only two people, who almost always die within a week of each other. The typical example is a loving couple who work together for a great purpose.
- granfalloon – a false karass; i.e., a group of people who imagine they have a connection that does not really exist. An example is "Hoosiers." Hoosiers are people from Indiana, and Hoosiers have no true spiritual destiny in common. They really share little more than a name.
- wampeter – the central theme or purpose of a karass. Each karass has two wampeters at any given time, one waxing and one waning.
- foma – harmless untruths
- wrang-wrang – Someone who steers a Bokononist away from their line of perception. For example, the narrator of the book is steered away from Nihilism when his Nihilist house sitter kills his cat and leaves his apartment in disrepair.
- kan-kan – An object or item that brings a person into their karass. The narrator states in the book that his kan-kan was the book he wrote about the Hiroshima bombing.
- sinookas – The intertwining "tendrils" of peoples' lives.
- vin-dit – a sudden shove in the direction of Bokononism
- saroon – to acquiesce to a vin-dit
- stuppa – a fogbound child (i.e. an idiot)
- duffle – the destiny of thousands of people placed on one "stuppa"
- sin-wat – a person who wants all of somebody's love for themself
- pool-pah – shit storm, but in some contexts: wrath of God
- Busy, busy, busy – words Bokononists whisper when they think about how complicated and unpredictable the machinery of life really is
- Now I will destroy the whole world – last words of a Bokononist before taking their own life
- boko-maru – the supreme act of worship of the Bokononists, which is an intimate act consisting of prolonged physical contact between the naked soles of the feet of two persons
- zah-mah-ki-bo – Inevitable destiny
- Borasisi and Pabu, the Sun god and lunar goddess; the binary trans-Neptunian object 66652 Borasisi and its moon, 66652 Borasisi I Pabu, now bear their names.†
  - Borasisi, the Sun, held Pabu, the Moon, in his arms and hoped that Pabu would bear him a fiery child. But poor Pabu gave birth to children that were cold, that did not burn...Then poor Pabu herself was cast away, and she went to live with her favorite child, which was Earth.

== Reception ==
After The Sirens of Titan (1959) and Mother Night (1962) received favorable reviews and sold well in paperback, large publisher Holt, Rinehart, and Winston issued Cat's Cradle as a hardcover original. Theodore Sturgeon praised Cat's Cradle, describing its storyline as "appalling, hilarious, shocking, and infuriating," and concluded that "this is an annoying book and you must read it. And you better take it lightly, because if you don't you'll go off weeping and shoot yourself."

According to Indianapolis Monthly, "In 1972, the school board in Strongsville, Ohio, banned the book without stating an official reason. Notes from the meeting include references to the book as 'completely sick' and 'garbage.' The ban was overturned in 1976." The book was also challenged in 1982 at New Hampshire's Merrimack High School.

Cat's Cradle was nominated for a Hugo Award for Best Novel in 1964.

== Film, television, and theatrical adaptations ==
- A theatrical adaptation (1976) by Bruce Pribram and Ken Kuta was presented and toured by Theatre Express, Pittsburgh, Pennsylvania.
- A musical adaptation was staged by Novel Stages in Philadelphia, Pennsylvania in 1995.
- In 2005, the book was optioned by Leonardo DiCaprio's production company, Appian Way Productions. James V. Hart, screenwriter for the film Contact (1997), and his son Jake Hart were linked to the developing script.
- A calypso musical adaptation was presented by the Untitled Theater Company #61 in New York in 2008.
- Noah Hawley has been set to direct a TV adaptation.

== In popular culture ==
- Jack Lancaster fronted a band in the early 1970s named Karass which included Chick Web, Percy Jones, John Goodsall and Robin Lumley.
- A modified version of Bokonon's poem "Nice, Nice, Very Nice" ("53rd Calypso") from the novel was also set to music by the soft rock band Ambrosia, with Vonnegut receiving co-writing credit, and featured as the opening track on their 1975 debut album. Vonnegut wrote to the band after hearing the song on the radio: "I myself am crazy about our song, of course, but what do I know and why wouldn't I be? This much I have always known, anyway: Music is the only art that's really worth a damn. I envy you guys."
- The Grateful Dead's publishing company, Ice Nine, was named after the fictional substance. Between 1983 and 1985, the band's leader Jerry Garcia worked with the scriptwriter and comedian Tom Davis on a screenplay based on the book. The film was never produced.
- Vonnegut collaborated with American composer Dave Soldier for a 1995 CD titled Ice-9 Ballads, featuring nine songs with lyrics taken from Cat's Cradle. Vonnegut narrated his lyrics to Soldier's music.
- The Born Ruffians 2008 album Red, Yellow & Blue includes a track called "Kurt Vonnegut" featuring the line from Cat's Cradle: "Tiger got to hunt bird got to fly Man got to sit and wonder why, why, why Tiger got to sleep bird got to land Man got to tell himself he understand."
- The band Ice Nine Kills derived their name from the fictional substance in Cat's Cradle.
