= Naomi Jaye =

Canadian film director and screenwriter

Naomi Jaye is a Canadian film director and screenwriter from Toronto, Ontario. She is most noted for her 2024 film Darkest Miriam, for which she received Canadian Screen Award nominations for Best Director and Best Adapted Screenplay at the 13th Canadian Screen Awards in 2025.

A graduate of the Canadian Film Centre, she made a number of short films before releasing The Pin, her directorial debut and the first Yiddish language film ever made in Canada, in 2013. She has also created video art installation projects, including MRI.

In 2022 she staged Miriam's World, a multimedia theatrical adaptation of the same Martha Baillie novel that would become Darkest Miriam, at Theatre Passe Muraille.

She won the Directors Guild of Canada award for best direction in a Canadian film at the 2024 Fantasia International Film Festival for Darkest Miriam.

== Filmography ==
- A Dozen for Lulu - 2002
- Peep - 2004
- Seeking Simone - 2009
- The Pin - 2013
- Body Parts - 2014
- Miriam's World - 2019
- MRI - 2021
- Darkest Miriam - 2024
- Pool - TBA
