= Sundowners (2017 film) =

2017 Canadian film

- Directed by: Pavan Moondi
- Written by: Pavan Moondi
- Produced by: Tyler Levine; Brian Robertson; Julia Rosenberg
- Starring: Phil Hanley; Tim Heidecker; Luke Lalonde
- Cinematography: Peter Dreimanis; Scott McClellan
- Edited by: Pavan Moondi
- Music by: Nick Thorburn
- Production companies: Carousel Pictures; Daylight on Mars Pictures; January Films
- Distributed by: Search Engine Films
- Release date: April 22, 2017
- Running time: 98 minutes
- Country: Canada
- Language: English

Sundowners is a 2017 Canadian comedy-drama film, written and directed by Pavan Moondi.

The film stars Phil Hanley as Alex, an aspiring filmmaker who is stuck working as a wedding videographer for unscrupulous boss Tom (Tim Heidecker). Assigned to shoot a destination wedding in Mexico, he enlists his friend Justin (Luke Lalonde) to come along as his assistant only for an endless series of mishaps and snafus to bedevil the proceedings, including Justin's ex-girlfriend (Leah Fay Goldstein) showing up to demand that he pay for the abortion she just had without telling him; groom Mike's (Nick Flanagan) fear that his fiancée Jenny (Cara Gee) will leave him when she finds out he recently declared bankruptcy; and best man Nick (Nicholas Thorburn) planning to break up the wedding because he's in love with Jenny.

The cast also includes Jackie Pirico as Jenny's sex-obsessed sister Sarah, Chris Locke as Randy, and David John Philips as Jenny's gay father who is immediately attracted to Justin.

The film premiered in April 2017 at the Nashville Film Festival, before going into Canadian commercial release in August.

== Cast ==
- Phil Hanley as Alex Hopper
- Chris Locke as Randy
- Luke Lalonde as Justin Brown
- Jill Frappier as Justin's Grandmother
- Tim Heidecker as Tom
- Cara Gee as Jenny

== Production ==
Moondi indicated that he had begun writing the film before his 2015 film Diamond Tongues, but felt that something was missing in the script until deciding that he "needed to go deeper with the characters, with the real intention to engage with the expectations of what a vacation-gone-awry comedy is. We do it on purpose 10, 12 times in the film, where we veer people down a path of where they think they know what's going to happen, but then it doesn't pay off, deliberately."

The scenes set in Mexico were actually shot in Colombia, which was actively trying to recruit film production and offered a number of incentives, including the use of a resort that was much less expensive, and much less busy with real tourist activity that might have interfered with production, than anything Moondi could have found in Mexico. Production locations in Canada included the home of Goldstein's father, Toronto Sun columnist Lorrie Goldstein.

== Critical response ==
Norman Wilner of Now rated the film four N's, writing that "Moondi loves the moment when awkwardness turns to panic, and Hanley and Lalonde are really good at drawing that moment out to excruciating lengths. But keep an eye on Cara Gee as the enthusiastic bride-to-be, also Diamond Tongues’ Goldstein turns up for one solid early scene. And if Diamond Tongues was compassionate about its self-destructive protagonist, Sundowners knows its heroes are dolts – inept with women, sloppy with their equipment, terrible at arranging wake-up calls. They're doofuses but at least they're trying, so we root for them to carve out one tiny victory somewhere, even though we know that's probably not going to happen. But we can still laugh."

For The Hollywood Reporter, Frank Scheck wrote that "Sundowners lacks the uncomfortable edginess of Moondi's last (co-directed) effort, the acclaimed Diamond Tongues. But this film manages to capture millennial angst in subtle, darkly funny fashion. Expertly delivering Moondi's sharp comic dialogue, the two leads, both making their screen acting debuts, make their characters’ haplessness surprisingly endearing, while such supporting players as Heidecker and Pirico prove adept comic scene stealers."

Andy Webster of The New York Times wrote that "Pavan Moondi — the Toronto filmmaker who wrote, edited and directed 'Sundowners' — is fond of setups without payoffs: an exchange between Justin and his ex-girlfriend (Leah Fay Goldstein) about her abortion is not followed up; the best man’s ambition to interrupt the vows is not acted upon; a suggestion from Justin that he and Alex ultimately remain in Mexico instead of returning to their unrewarding routine is shot down. Closure may be missing, but at least glimpses of promising Canadian performers are in abundant supply."

Barry Hertz of The Globe and Mail opined that "where most filmmakers would take such a premise to spin a har-har tale of drunken high jinks, Moondi uses the set-up to subvert expectations and plumb the darkest corners of his leads' insecurities. It is at times extremely uncomfortable, but captivating and engaging all the same."
