= Brian Robertson (filmmaker) =

Canadian producer and director

- Born: Toronto, Canada
- Occupations: Producer, director

Brian Robertson is a Canadian film and television producer and director based in Toronto, Ontario. He is most noted as producer of the 2024 film Darkest Miriam, which was a Canadian Screen Award nominee for Best Picture at the 13th Canadian Screen Awards in 2025.

Between 2020 and 2022, he produced the documentary series Cursed Films for Shudder. The series delves into the myths and legends surrounding iconic horror films. The series premiered at South by Southwest (SXSW) and has been well-received for its deep and insightful exploration of film history.

Although principally a producer, he also co-directed the 2015 film Diamond Tongues.

He is the founder and head of the Toronto film production company Low End.

== Filmography ==
- Freakers - 2010, producer and director
- Everyday Is Like Sunday - 2013, producer
- Diamond Tongues - 2015, producer and co-director
- Sundowners - 2017, producer
- Ordinary Days - 2017, producer
- Birds Without Feathers - 2018, producer
- Cursed Films - 2020-2022, producer
- Cosmic Dawn - 2021, producer
- Tenzin - 2021, producer
- Tramps! - 2022, producer
- Stay the Night - 2022, producer
- V/H/S/Beyond: "Abduction/Adduction" - 2024, producer
- Darkest Miriam - 2024, producer
