= David Dineen-Porter =

Canadian actor and musician

- Born: December 16, 1979 (age 46)
- Origin: Toronto, Ontario, Canada
- Genres: Electronic Music folk music Indie Rock; Chiptune; Pop
- Occupations: Actor; Writer; Filmmaker; Comedian; Musician; Songwriter; Remixer
- Instruments: guitar Game Boy; Commodore 64; Vocals
- Years active: 1998–Present
- Label: Blocks Recording Club

David Dineen-Porter (born 1979) is an actor, comedian and musician from Toronto, Ontario, Canada.

== Career ==
Dineen-Porter has performed stand-up and sketch comedy in Toronto since 1997 and is a regular on Laugh Sabbath. He is former director of the University of Toronto comedy review 'The Bob', and is co-founder of sketch troupes Uncle Sevario, Someone and the Somethings, and The Iliads.

He has also been a featured performer at the Tuesday Riot in Chicago in early 2007. In 2013, David starred in the Canadian independent feature film, Everyday Is Like Sunday, as Mark – a ne'er do well Torontonian trying to get his life together.

He was a writer for The Late Late Show with James Corden.

== Filmography ==
- War of the Dead (2006)
- Blood Creek (2006)
- Chicknapping (2006)
- Screwed Over (3 episodes 2006) (TV)
- L'Brondelle's Universe (2008)
- Everyday Is Like Sunday (2013)

== Discography ==
- "Building Blocks" (upcoming March 25, 2010) Blocks Recording Club
- "Relationships to Me" (2009) Superbutton
- Weezer: The 8-bit Album (2009) Pterodactyl Squad
- "System Override" (2009) Blocks Recording Club
- "The Company (remix)" (2009) (original by Kids on TV)
- "Alice Part 2" (2008) (Limited Edition free CD)
- "Alice Part 1: Fecal Alcohol Syndrome" (2007) Superbutton
