= July Talk (album) =

Studio album by July Talk
- Released: 2012
- Studio: Dreamhouse Studios
- Genre: Indie rock
- Length: 43:21
- Label: Sleepless Records
- Producer: Alexandre Bonenfant

July Talk chronology
July Talk (2012)	Touch (2016)

July Talk is the debut full-length album by Canadian indie rock band July Talk. Originally released in 2012 on Sleepless Records, the album won the Juno Award for Alternative Album of the Year at the Juno Awards of 2015 after the release of an expanded edition in 2013.

== For Your Bloodshot Eyes ==
The album's American release included three songs not on either the original or expanded Canadian editions of the album. These songs, "Gentleman", "Blood + Honey" and "Uninvited", were released in Canada as the separate EP For Your Bloodshot Eyes in 2014.

== Track listing ==
† denotes tracks that were added to the expanded 2013 edition.

1. "Garden"
2. "Guns + Ammunition"
3. "Paper Girl"
4. "Brother"
5. "Someone"
6. "Having You Around"
7. "Headsick" †
8. "Summer Dress" †
9. "My Neck" †
10. "Let Her Know"
11. "Don't Call Home"
12. "Black Lace" †
13. "Come Down Champion"
14. "I've Rationed Well"

== Certifications ==
Region	Certification	Certified units/sales
Canada (Music Canada)	Platinum	80,000^{‡}
^{‡} Sales+streaming figures based on certification alone.
