= Remember Never Before =

Studio album by July Talk
- Released: January 20, 2023
- Studio: Dreamhouse Studios
- Genre: Alternative
- Length: 40:58
- Label: Six Shooter Records
- Producer: Graham Walsh, Ian Docherty, Kevin Drew

July Talk chronology
Pray for It (2020)	Remember Never Before (2023)

Remember Never Before is the fourth full-length album by Canadian indie-rock band July Talk, released January 20, 2023 on Six Shooter Records. The album was produced by Graham Walsh, Kevin Drew and July Talk guitarist Ian Docherty.

The album was previewed in full with a sold-out show at the Horseshoe Tavern in Toronto in October 2022, as well as the release of the songs "After This", "Certain Father" and "Hold" as advance singles.

In 2024, the band also released a deluxe edition of the album, featuring two unreleased songs and four live performances of album tracks.

== Production ==
The band acknowledged that the COVID-19 pandemic was an influence on the album's themes.

Leah Fay Goldstein said that "it's kind of like there's a fork in the road when the path of darkness you've been traveling down feels endless. Eventually it's like 'Okay, do you want to give up or keep going?' Is life worth living? Do you believe in people enough to see how it all turns out? Choose your player: hope or despair. And we unabashedly chose life and love and energy and giving less f***s about what people think and that was liberating for us. That's the energy we tried to capture on Remember Never Before. It's not ignoring anything we're currently dealing with. On the contrary, it's set in the middle of it all."

For his part, Peter Dreimanis stated that "We wanted to put the listener in a position of, ‘OK, well, you can move again … what are you going to do about it?’ We felt the responsibility to inject some joy and hope into whoever would listen. Songs like ‘After This,’ ‘Silent Type’ and ‘When You Stop’ are all putting the listener in the hot seat. ‘Remembering Never Before’ became sort of a thesis as we moved through the making of it, with the idea of, how do we return to something we’ve never experienced yet as people that have learned so much about ourselves? As people who have changed so drastically over the last couple of years, how do we find hope and moments of pure astonishment? I think it’s the listener’s responsibility to find that for themselves."

According to the band, Drew encouraged them to come to the studio without preconceived ideas about the album, and allow it to take shape spontaneously.

Spencer Krug of Wolf Parade appears as a guest vocalist on "Certain Father".

== Critical response ==
Paul Dika of Exclaim! rated the album 7/10, writing that "The album's title bluntly frames the new full-length as something of a re-birth, and the opening track reinforces that sentiment. "After This" kicks things off with a reminder that July Talk are still a rock n' roll band at heart, just not the one they were ten years ago. Goldstein and Dreimanis trade restrained verses with staccato guitars that build to an explosive, urgent chorus. The peaks and valleys of "After This" are a taste of the album as a whole — Remember Never Before is dynamic in a way that wasn't fully realized on their previous effort."

For The Spill Magazine, Gerrod Harris rated it 4/5, writing that "Remember Never Before is perhaps July Talk’s most refined collection of music yet. On their fourth record, the now expanded band is approaching their songwriting in a nearly compositional manner, resulting in fuller arrangements and cinematic tones organically clashing with alternative rock riffs and beats. Remember Never Before marks a step forward for July Talk, one which, for the better, they may never return from."

== Track listing ==
1. "After This"
2. "Certain Father" (featuring Spencer Krug)
3. "Human Side"
4. "Hold"
5. "G-d Mother Fire"
6. "When You Stop"
7. "Silent Type"
8. "Twenty Four Hours"
9. "Repeat"
10. "Raw"
11. "I Am Water"

=== Deluxe edition bonus tracks ===
1. "No Safe + Sound"
2. "Rabbit Side"
3. "After This (Live)"
4. "Human Side (Live)"
5. "I Am Water (Live)"
6. "When You Stop (Piano Version)"
