= Pavan Moondi =

Pavan Moondi (born August 21, 1985) is a Canadian film and television director and screenwriter.

== Biography ==
Originally from Kitchener, Ontario, Moondi made a number of short films before expanding his last short film into the feature film Everyday Is Like Sunday (2013). He followed up in 2015 with Diamond Tongues, which was co-directed by producer Brian Robertson, and in 2017 with Sundowners.

His films have been noted in particular for his frequent casting of musicians with little or no prior acting experience, including Nicholas Thorburn, Dan Werb, Leah Fay Goldstein, Peter Dreimanis and Luke Lalonde.

In television he directed the 2016 CBC Television series Four in the Morning, was a story editor on the writing team for Schitt's Creek, and wrote one episode of the television series Find Me in Paris.

His fourth feature film, Middle Life, premiered at the 2025 Calgary International Film Festival.
