= Everyday Is Like Sunday (film) =

- Directed by: Pavan Moondi
- Written by: Pavan Moondi; Michael Sloane
- Produced by: Brian Robertson; Pavan Moondi
- Starring: David Dineen-Porter; Coral Osborne; Adam Gurfinkel
- Cinematography: Joseph Puglia
- Edited by: Simone Smith
- Music by: Kathryn Calder
- Release date: August 16, 2013
- Running time: 90 minutes
- Country: Canada
- Language: English

Everyday Is Like Sunday is a 2013 Canadian independent film directed by Pavan Moondi. It stars David Dineen-Porter, Coral Osborne and Adam Gurfinkel as twenty-something friends and roommates trying to come to terms with adulthood.

The film had a limited theatrical release in Canada on August 16, 2013, and was acquired for Canadian distribution by Mongrel Media in January 2014.

== Cast ==
- David Dineen-Porter as Mark Stillman
- Coral Osborne as Flora
- Adam Gurfinkel as Jason
- Nick Thorburn as Damien
- Mackenzie Leigh as Amanda
- Bo Martyn as Anelie
- Sarah Ford as Resume Doctor
- Nick Flanagan as Joey
- Dan Werb as Cartwright

== Release ==
The film premiered to generally favorable reviews. Manori Ravindran for the National Post wrote "Millennial angst in gritty urban centres could warrant its own section in The New York Times. We’re poor, we’re jobless, we’re lonely, we get it. But there’s an honesty and whip smart humour to the micro-budget Everyday Is Like Sunday that separates it from similar fare. Exclaim!'s Kevin Scott praised the film as a "fiercely funny depiction of a specific brand of late 20s malaise."
