= Say It (Born Ruffians album) =

Studio album by Born Ruffians
- Released: June 1, 2010
- Recorded: Fall 2009; Canada at Metalworks Studios in Mississauga, Ontario
- Genre: Indie rock
- Length: 38:41
- Label: Warp; Paper Bag Records
- Producer: Rusty Santos

Born Ruffians chronology
| Red, Yellow & Blue (2008) | Say It (2010) | Birthmarks (2013) |

Say It is the second studio album by Canadian rock band Born Ruffians, released on June 1, 2010, by Paper Bag Records in Canada and Warp Records worldwide.

The album was recorded in Toronto and mastered in Brooklyn. The band's first single off the album is “What to Say."

== Background ==
As Born Ruffians confirmed the upcoming release of the album, they announced their intentions for the new album: "If Born Ruffians’ 2008 debut album Red Yellow and Blue was the result of a talented and precocious gang of freshmen, their 2010 follow-up, Say It, would be the project they left school to finish — a declaration that they're smart and ambitious enough to make it on their own, and furthermore, that they're in it for the long haul." Of hopes for the album, Luke Lalonde said, “We don’t want to leave little mistakes on, we want to make it sound pretty clean and pop-music friendly. We’re trying to make a hit record but in the most genuine way-- We just want it to sound like us live … but better.”

== Name ==
The album's name emerged after a rift among the band's members. "'We had a therapeutic talk and put everything on the table,' Lalonde explains. 'We toured too much I think. A lot of stress within our band built up and got blown out of proportion.' They vowed to never let issues go unsaid ever again. To, you know, just say it. 'So Say It has a lot of lyrics about communication and the difficulties of articulating ideas … like I’ve had talking to you this whole time,' Lalonde says. 'That’s our new philosophy, to talk about things before they happen, so we know that we’re on the same page.'

== Track history ==
- "Retard Canard" – In an interview with their PR company 2:30 Publicity, Lalonde recounts some of the ideas and feelings that went into the song: “Retard Canard is about a certain kind of person who feels like they don’t fit in, or can’t fit in and get along in life. That’s where the “not part of the human race” lyric comes from; it's about how you just have to do it, or die trying.” The song's chorus also references The Ink Spots song "I Don't Want to Set the World on Fire".
- "Sole Brother" – An early version of the song can be found on Daytrotter, where Luke discusses its development. "Again a new song though this title will definitely stick. We were working on it in rehearsal and Steve had this melody in his head so I told him he should sing it. His words were all about wanting to be a soul brother, and many of his idols being rappers etc... My half of the song was about my mom nagging me to help my grandfather rake his leaves so I decided to have a transition from one into the other about how I'd like to be an only child and how I was bitter towards my sister because she never had to help do the hard chores. It only seemed logical to me to change soul to sole as a joke. Sole brother/only child."
- What to Say - "'What to Say' is about how much and how little sense we make when we speak," Lalonde told SPIN.com. "It's about the multitude of wrong words and the never-ending search for the right ones. May you choose wisely." Hamelin describes “What To Say” as “one of those songs where we put it together out of a bunch of different ideas, and it really came together as a cohesive whole. Unlike some of the songs we've put together out of a bunch of ideas, and they sound like a bunch of different ideas.”

== Reception ==
Professional ratings
Review scores
| Source | Rating |
|---|---|
| AllMusic | 3.5/5 stars |
| BLARE Magazine | 3.5/5 stars |
| Consequence of Sound | 3/5 stars |
| Drowned in Sound | 8/10 |
| Exclaim! | (positive) |
| NME | 7/10 |
| The Phoenix | 3/4 stars |
| Prefix | 7/10 |
| Pitchfork Media | 3.8/10 |
| Spin | 6/10 |
| Spinner.com | (positive) |
| TORO | 3.5/5 stars |

Say It received a mixed critical reception, with an aggregated rating of 66/100 on Metacritic. Drowned in Sound stated that it was "much more cohesive than its predecessor" and "a much improved piece of art" compared to Red, Yellow & Blue. However Pitchfork described it as "amateurish" and claimed it sounded "rushed and half-finished".

== Track listing ==
| No. | Title | Length |
|---|---|---|
| 1. | "Oh Man" | 4:03 |
| 2. | "Retard Canard" | 4:22 |
| 3. | "Sole Brother" | 4:25 |
| 4. | "What to Say" | 4:32 |
| 5. | "The Ballad of Moose Bruce" | 3:53 |
| 6. | "Higher & Higher" | 3:33 |
| 7. | "Come Back" | 3:46 |
| 8. | "Nova-Leigh" | 4:15 |
| 9. | "Blood, the Sun & Water" | 2:54 |
| 10. | "At Home Now" | 2:58 |
