= CBX: Canadian Ballroom Extravaganza =

Canadian reality competition web series

- Promotional poster
- Country of origin: Canada

CBX: Canadian Ballroom Extravaganza is a Canadian reality competition web series, which premiered on CBC Arts in March 2022. The series features ten Canadian ballroom artists paired with emerging Canadian filmmakers to create short films highlighting their performances in five ball categories, with audience voting to determine the winner of each challenge until the ultimate winner of the competition is decided. Each of the five categories is also paired with a short introductory video which introduces the competing teams and an overview of the category criteria, as well as informational videos on the overall history and culture of ballroom.

The five categories in the competition are Face, Runway, Bizarre, Vogue and Sex Siren.

The final winner of the competition was announced on May 6, judged by a panel comprising ballroom competitor Miyoko, music video director Sammy Rawal and drag queen Kimora Amour.

== Teams ==
The winner of each category is bolded; the winner of the overall competition is highlighted.

| Category | Team | Artist | Filmmaker |
|---|---|---|---|
| Face | **Team Diamond Eyes** | **Mother Juju Telfar** | **Mina Sewell Mancuso** |
| Face | Team Brava | cuartababy | Daniel Lastres |
| Runway | **Team Gagnon** | **James "Songbird" Baley** | **Kyisha Williams** |
| Runway | Team 27.7 | Sileecka | Joshua Rille |
| Bizarre | **Team Best Served Bold** | **Adrienne Pan aka Mookh Dali** | **Adrian Siegel** |
| Bizarre | Team Bog Beast | Ivy Andromeda | Dizzy Ricamara |
| Vogue | **Team Cloak and Dagger** | **Matthew "Snoopy" Cuff** | **Onyeka Oduh** |
| Vogue | Team Love | Ali "Old Navy" Desrosiers | Jontae McCrory |
| Sex Siren | **Team Deviance** | **Amiyah Telfar West** | **Michelle Hanitijo** |
| Sex Siren | Team Ego Death | N9ne Margiela | Alejandra Carranza |
