= Julie Baldassi =

Canadian film producer

Julie Baldassi is a Canadian film producer. She is most noted as a producer of the 2021 film Wildhood, which was a Canadian Screen Award nominee for Best Picture at the 10th Canadian Screen Awards in 2021, and the 2024 film Darkest Miriam, which was a Best Picture nominee at the 13th Canadian Screen Awards in 2025.

The president of Younger Daughter Films, her other credits have included the short films My Dead Dad's Porno Tapes and I Am in the World as Free and Slender as a Deer on a Plain, the feature film Tenzin, and the music video for Jeremy Dutcher's song "Mehcinut".
