= Middle Life =

- Directed by: Pavan Moondi
- Screenplay by: Pavan Moondi
- Produced by: Peter Dreimanis; Pavan Moondi; Jared Raab; Leah Fay Goldstein; Dean Perlmutter
- Starring: Leah Fay Goldstein; Peter Dreimanis; Luke Lalonde
- Cinematography: Jared Raab
- Edited by: Pavan Moondi
- Music by: Ben Fox
- Production companies: Daylight on Mars Pictures; Smash Arts
- Release date: September 20, 2025 (CIFF)
- Running time: 84 minutes
- Country: Canada
- Language: English

Middle Life is a Canadian romantic comedy film, directed by Pavan Moondi and released in 2025. The film stars Leah Fay Goldstein as Andie, a new mother dealing with a lack of fulfillment in her marriage, who saves Ryan (Peter Dreimanis) from an accident and subsequently becomes romantically drawn to his free-spirited and fun-loving nature after they meet again a few months later.

The cast also includes Luke Lalonde, Norah Savada and Colin Burgess.

== Production ==
The film was shot in December 2024 and January 2025 in Toronto and Los Angeles.

== Distribution ==
The film had its world premiere on September 20, 2025, at the Calgary International Film Festival, and screened at the 2025 Vancouver International Film Festival in October.

== Critical response ==
Barry Hertz of The Globe and Mail called it a charming romantic comedy that should probably go into Canadian commercial release as part of a double bill with a July Talk concert.
