= July Talk: Love Lives Here =

2023 Canadian documentary film

July Talk: Love Loves Here
- Directed by: Brittany Farhat
- Written by: Brittany Farhat
- Produced by: Peter Dreimanis; Leah Fay Goldstein
- Starring: July Talk
- Cinematography: Mike McLaughlin; Jared Raab; Adam Crosby; Peter Dreimanis; Brittany Farhat; Matthew Fong
- Edited by: Brittany Farhat
- Music by: July Talk
- Production company: Danuta
- Distributed by: Levelfilm
- Release date: May 3, 2023 (Hot Docs)
- Running time: 83 minutes
- Country: Canada
- Language: English

July Talk: Love Lives Here is a 2023 Canadian documentary film written and directed by Brittany Farhat. The film centres on the rock band July Talk, as they plan and perform a drive-in concert at the Stardust Drive-In in Sharon, Ontario, after the COVID-19 pandemic in Canada upends their plans to undertake a conventional concert tour in support of their album Pray for It.

The film premiered at the 2023 Hot Docs Canadian International Documentary Festival.

== Production ==
In a piece for CBC Arts's Cutaway feature, in which filmmakers write about their process of making the film, Farhat clarified that she had worked separately from the crew that were producing the concert's livestream, and tried to depict the creative process that led up to the performance so that her film would not simply replicate the livestream.

== Critical response ==
Sarah Bea Milner of Exclaim! wrote that "as is often the case with music documentaries, it's not necessary to be an existing fan to enjoy and learn from the film, but it certainly helps. People familiar with July Talk will get more out of the content; the band is known for its live performances, and the chaotic, high-energy vibe does not translate fully in this format. Love Lives Here makes a point to cover the group's past gruelling tour schedule and to discuss how important live shows are to July Talk's ethos, but this can only do so much. Watching clips of a concert just doesn't compare to being there in person, feeling the intimacy of the moment and the energy of the room. July Talk isn't a stadium band — they play the Danforth, not Scotiabank Arena. And they put on a hell of a show."

For That Shelf, Dakota Arsenault wrote that "The band has always been famous for their live-wire concerts, where [Leah Fay] Goldstein and [Peter] Dreimanis get so aggressively into their performances that they look like a fight will break out at any moment. Witnessing the evolution of their live shows is fascinating, but we don’t get enough footage of the headlining event: the drive-in show. We see the band rehearsing songs but as it transitions into the actual performance, we’re shown only a handful of tracks. Love Lives Here allows hard-core fans to see some backstage footage and the band’s process for working, but it doesn’t offer enough for casual listeners or people unfamiliar with their work to stand out as a truly great music documentary."

Andrew Parker of TheGATE.ca opined that "while a bit more focus on one specific area over others might help the flow of Farhat’s film, July Talk: Love Lives Here does a good job of capturing the band’s unique aesthetic and relationships. The drive-in show contrasts starkly with archival footage of pre-COVID concerts, with honking horns and flashing hazard lights taking the place of screaming hordes and cell phone flashlights, but the performance is top notch, and the odd setting suits the band’s new direction. Farhat’s decision to shoot predominantly in black and white also leads to some striking images, particularly during the performances towards the end."
