= Uncle, Duke & The Chief =

Studio album by Born Ruffians
- Released: February 16, 2018
- Genre: Indie rock
- Length: 30:28
- Label: Yep Roc Records; Paper Bag Records
- Producer: Richard Swift

Born Ruffians chronology
RUFF (2015)	Uncle, Duke & The Chief (2018)

Professional ratings
Aggregate scores
Source	Rating
AnyDecentMusic?	6.8/10
Metacritic	71/100
Review scores
Source	Rating
AllMusic	3.5/5 stars
Clash	5/10
DIY Mag	3/5 stars
Exclaim!	8/10

Uncle, Duke & The Chief is the fifth studio album by Canadian rock band Born Ruffians, released on February 16, 2018, by Paper Bag Records in Canada and Yep Roc Records worldwide.

== Track listing ==
No.	Title	Length
1.	"Forget Me"	3:36
2.	"Miss You"	2:59
3.	"Side Tracked"	3:49
4.	"Fade To Black"	4:03
5.	"Love Too Soon"	2:42
6.	"Spread So Thin"	3:18
7.	"Tricky"	3:09
8.	"Ring That Bell"	2:26
9.	"Working Together"	4:32
