= Darkest Miriam =

2024 Canadian drama film

- Directed by: Naomi Jaye
- Written by: Naomi Jaye
- Based on: The Incident Report by Martha Baillie
- Produced by: Julie Baldassi; Brian Robertson
- Starring: Britt Lower; Tom Mercier; Sook-Yin Lee; Jean Yoon
- Cinematography: Michael LeBlanc
- Edited by: Lev Lewis
- Music by: Eliza Niemi; Louie Short
- Production companies: Younger Daughter Films; Low End; Through The Lens Entertainment
- Distributed by: Game Theory Films
- Release date: June 9, 2024 (Tribeca)
- Running time: 90 minutes
- Country: Canada
- Language: English

Darkest Miriam is a 2024 Canadian drama film, directed by Naomi Jaye. Adapted from Martha Baillie's novel The Incident Report, the film stars Britt Lower as Miriam, a librarian in Toronto who leads a closed-off, grief-stricken life after her father's death; amid a series of strange incidents at the library, she meets and begins a romance with Janko (Tom Mercier), a Slovenian immigrant who opens her up to new possibilities.

The cast also includes Sook-Yin Lee, Jean Yoon, Jaimara Beals, Clyde Whitham, Susannah Hoffmann, Scott McCulloch, Igor Shamuilov, Joshua Odjick, Sarah Li Wen Du, Anita Yung, Peter Millard, Danté Prince, Scott Ryan Yamamura, Jamaal Grant, Aviva Armour-Ostroff, and Laura Afelskie.

== Production ==
The film began production in 2022 in Toronto and Hamilton, initially as The Incident Report. American filmmaker Charlie Kaufman is an executive producer.

== Distribution ==
The film premiered at the 2024 Tribeca Film Festival, and had its Canadian premiere at the 28th Fantasia International Film Festival, where it won the 2024 DGC Best Director prize.

It later screened in the Borsos Competition program at the 2024 Whistler Film Festival.

== Critical response ==
Caryn James of The Hollywood Reporter called the film a "small wonder", writing, "there is a dramatic turn at the end that we don't see coming, and Lower allows us to feel Miriam's deep emotional pain, yet the film ends with Miriam pointed toward the future. That mix of the tragic and the hopeful is just the kind of off-kilter balance that makes the film so exceptional and compelling. Charlie Kaufman has lent his name to the project as an executive producer, and while there is a definite sympathy between his imaginative approach and hers, Jaye's artistry comes through as purely hers, a true discovery."

Josh Korngut of Exclaim! gave the film a mixed review, writing, "unfortunately, the film's precociousness bogs it down. Stylistically, Darkest Miriam feels a bit like an approximation of Atom Egoyan, broken into chapters and labelled with pretentious, overly flowery subheadings. Style sometimes suffocates substance to the point that the film occasionally feels more like a Harbourfront modern dance piece than it does an engaging drama with burnt edges. All in all, Darkest Miriam is a somewhat fresh and strange character study worth watching for audiences with the right threshold for arthouse vagueness. Thankfully, Lower's title performance elevates the material, and Jaye's direction shows very real promise."

For Screen Anarchy, Olga Artemyeva wrote, "the film gives us a gentle love story, but it also features a very distinctive artistic voice and style, where opera outbursts and unexpected stills of plants in the middle of the story feel like an organic part of the intricate cinematic language. Like several other films at the Tribeca Film Festival, Darkest Miriam – while aesthetically very different from them – reflects on the necessity to let go of things, both painful and wonderful. As Jaye's movie also talks about art and its influence on how we perceive things, it also seems to frame the same idea this way: the painting of one's life can be dark or light, can be any texture, style or genre – just maybe don't let it become a still life."

== Awards ==
Award	Date of ceremony	Category	Recipient(s)	Result	Ref.
Fantasia International Film Festival	2024	Best Direction in a Canadian Film	Naomi Jaye	Won	
Canadian Film Festival	2025	Best Feature Film	Naomi Jaye	Won	
Canadian Screen Awards	2025	Best Picture	Julie Baldassi, Brian Robertson	Nominated	
Canadian Screen Awards	2025	Best Director	Naomi Jaye	Nominated	
Canadian Screen Awards	2025	Best Lead Performance in a Drama Film	Britt Lower	Nominated	
Canadian Screen Awards	2025	Best Supporting Performance in a Drama Film	Tom Mercier	Nominated	
Canadian Screen Awards	2025	Best Adapted Screenplay	Naomi Jaye	Nominated	
Canadian Screen Awards	2025	Best Sound Editing	Elma Bello	Nominated	
