= James Baley =

Canadian singer and dancer

James Baley is a Canadian singer and dancer from Toronto, Ontario, whose debut album A Story was released in 2021.

A longtime figure in Toronto's ballroom culture scene, Baley first became known as a musician when he contributed vocals to Azari's 2018 single "Gotasoul", which was a Juno Award nominee for Dance Recording of the Year at the Juno Awards of 2019. In 2020 he was a featured vocalist on "Champagne", a single from July Talk's Juno-winning album Pray for It, and has also been a guest vocalist with U.S. Girls, Zaki Ibrahim and Badge Époque Ensemble.

He released A Story in 2021, and promoted the album with an "immersive" live show at Toronto's Great Hall on October 22, which blended live music, ballroom performance and multimedia elements.

In 2022, Baley and filmmaker Kyisha Williams created a performance video for the ballroom competition series CBX: Canadian Ballroom Extravaganza.

He is out as gay.
