= Tenzin (film) =

- Directed by: Michael LeBlanc; Josh Reichmann
- Written by: Michael LeBlanc; Josh Reichmann; Tenzin Choekyi; Norbu Dhundup; Tenzin Kelsang; Salden Kunga; Chemi Lhamo; Yeshi Tenzin
- Produced by: Brian Robertson; Julie Baldassi; Andrew Nicholas McCann-Smith; Laura Perlmutter; Nick Sorbara
- Starring: Tenzin Kelsang; Tenzin Choekyi; Salden Kunga; Yeshi Tenzin; Chemi Lhamo
- Cinematography: Michael LeBlanc
- Edited by: Michael LeBlanc
- Music by: Colin Stetson
- Production companies: Low End; Younger Daughter Films
- Distributed by: Game Theory Films
- Release dates: November 2021 (Tallinn); March 17, 2023
- Running time: 74 minutes
- Country: Canada
- Languages: Tibetan; English

Tenzin is a 2021 Canadian drama film, directed by Michael LeBlanc and Josh Reichmann and released theatrically in Canada in 2023. The film stars Tenzin Kelsang as Tenzin, a young Tibetan Canadian man who is struggling to come to terms with the death of his older brother by self-immolation at a Tibetan independence movement demonstration.

The film's cast also includes Tenzin Choekyi, Salden Kunga, Yeshi Tenzin, Chemi Lhamo, Norbu Dhundup, Mr. Tibet Sangyal, Ivan Mendez Romero and Tsesang Wangmo. The screenplay was written collaboratively by the directors and the main cast members.

The film premiered in 2021 at the Tallinn Black Nights Film Festival. It had its Canadian premiere at the 2022 Canadian Film Festival, where Kelsang won the award for Best Breakthrough Performance.

Mara Zigler received a Canadian Screen Award nomination for Best Costume Design at the 11th Canadian Screen Awards in 2023.
