= Birthmarks (Born Ruffians album) =

Studio album by Born Ruffians
- Released: April 16, 2013
- Genre: Indie rock
- Length: 43:46 (standard); 73:08 (deluxe)
- Label: Yep Roc Records; Paper Bag Records
- Producer: Roger Leavens

Born Ruffians chronology
| Say It (2010) | Birthmarks (2013) | Ruff (2015) |

Alternate cover
- Deluxe Edition Cover Art

Birthmarks is the third studio album by Canadian rock band Born Ruffians, released on April 16, 2013, by Paper Bag Records in Canada and Yep Roc Records worldwide. The band released a limited edition deluxe version of the album on March 25, 2014 that included a second disc with outtakes, unreleased tracks and acoustic versions. The third track from the second disc "Oh Cecilia" was released only on CD, YouTube, and SoundCloud due to sample use restrictions. On September 13, 2022, they re-released a censored version of the song through audio streaming services for the first time.

== Track listing ==
| No. | Title | Length |
|---|---|---|
| 1. | "Needle" | 3:33 |
| 2. | "6-5000" | 4:33 |
| 3. | "Ocean's Deep" | 2:47 |
| 4. | "Permanent Hesitation" | 4:02 |
| 5. | "Cold Pop" | 3:46 |
| 6. | "Golden Promises" | 4:11 |
| 7. | "Rage Flows" | 3:17 |
| 8. | "So Slow" | 4:04 |
| 9. | "With Her Shadow" | 3:47 |
| 10. | "Too Soaked To Break" | 3:31 |
| 11. | "Dancing On The Edge Of Our Graves" | 3:40 |
| 12. | "Never Age" | 2:31 |

Deluxe Edition (Disc 2)
| No. | Title | Length |
|---|---|---|
| 1. | "Harmony" | 3:39 |
| 2. | "Cherry Wine" | 3:42 |
| 3. | "Oh Cecilia" (Exclusive to CD) | 3:20 |
| 4. | "With An Ax" | 4:15 |
| 5. | "Rage Flows (Acoustic)" | 3:18 |
| 6. | "Wandering Eye" | 4:15 |
| 7. | "Needle (Acoustic)" | 3:51 |
| 8. | "Never Age (Acoustic)" | 3:14 |
| 9. | "Your Suffferin' Heart" | 3:54 |
