= Pray for It =

Studio album by July Talk
- Released: July 10, 2020
- Genre: Indie rock
- Label: Sleepless Records
- Producer: Burke Reid, Graham Walsh, David Plowman, Milan Sarkadi, Ben Fox

July Talk chronology
Touch (2016)	Pray for It (2020)	Remember Never Before (2023)

Pray for It is the third full-length album by Canadian indie rock band July Talk, released July 10, 2020 on Sleepless Records. The album won the Juno Award for Alternative Album of the Year at the Juno Awards of 2021, and Cosette Schulz's video for "Governess Shadow" was longlisted for the 2021 Prism Prize.

In 2023 Brittany Farhat released the concert/documentary film July Talk: Love Lives Here, which profiled the band's attempts to mount a drive-in concert tour to support the album during the COVID-19 pandemic in Canada.

== Track listing ==
No.	Title	Length
1.	"Identical Love"	4:43
2.	"Good Enough"	4:12
3.	"Life of the Party"	3:51
4.	"Pretender"	3:27
5.	"Pay for It"	5:08
6.	"Champagne (feat. Kyla Charter and James Baley)"	5:12
7.	"Friend of Mine"	3:20
8.	"The News"	3:39
9.	"Governess Shadow"	3:17
10.	"See You Thru"	3:42
11.	"Still Sacred"	2:21
