= Touch (July Talk album) =

Studio album by July Talk
- Released: September 9, 2016
- Studio: Jukasa Studios; Dreamhouse Studios
- Genre: Indie rock
- Length: 36 min.
- Label: Sleepless Records
- Producer: Ian Davenport, Alexandre Bonenfant

July Talk chronology
July Talk (2012)	Touch (2016)	Pray for It (2020)

Touch is the second full-length album by Canadian indie rock band July Talk, released September 9, 2016 on Sleepless Records. The album won the Juno Award for Alternative Album of the Year at the Juno Awards of 2017.

Tanya Tagaq appears as a guest vocalist on the album, on the track "Beck + Call".

== Critical reception ==
Sandra Sperounes of the Edmonton Journal described the album as "a thrusting, sweaty, and intimate look at lust, loneliness, obsession, and privacy in a world dominated by cellphones, computers, and consumption." Matt Williams commented in Now that "July Talk's sophomore record bristles with the electricity of connection - between singers Leah Fay and Peter Dreimanis and the characters inside the songs."

== Track listing ==
No.	Title	Length
1.	"Picturing Love"	3:35
2.	"Beck + Call"	3:06
3.	"Now I Know"	3:48
4.	"Johnny + Mary"	2:27
5.	"Strange Habit"	4:34
6.	"Push + Pull"	2:51
7.	"Lola + Joseph"	3:34
8.	"So Sorry"	3:06
9.	"Jesus Said So"	4:23
10.	"Touch"	5:14

== Certifications ==
Region	Certification	Certified units/sales
Canada (Music Canada)	Gold	40,000^{‡}
^{‡} Sales+streaming figures based on certification alone.
