= Born Ruffians =

Canadian indie rock band

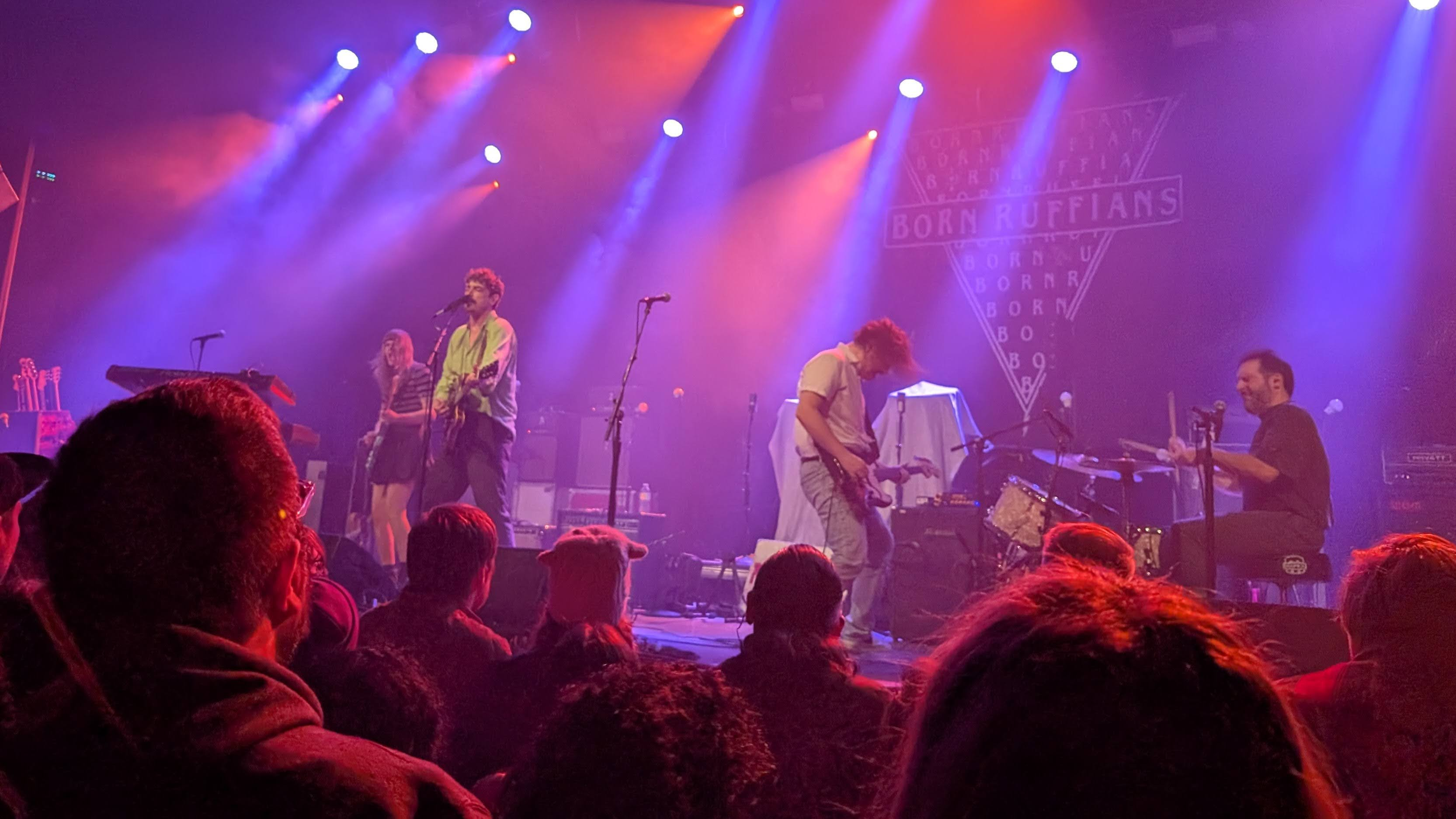
- Born Ruffians performing at History in November 2024. From left to right: Maddy Wilde, Luke Lalonde, Mitch DeRosier, Steve Hamelin

Background information
- Origin: Midland, Ontario, Canada
- Genres: Indie rock, post-punk revival
- Years active: 2002–present
- Labels: Yep Roc, Warp, Wavy Haze, Paper Bag
- Members: Mitch DeRosier; Steve Hamelin; Luke Lalonde; Maddy Wilde
- Past members: Andy Lloyd; Adam Hindle
- Website: www.bornruffians.ca

Born Ruffians are a Canadian indie rock band based in Toronto. Officially founded in 2004 in the Georgian Bay town of Midland, Ontario, the band is composed of frontman Luke Lalonde, bassist Mitch DeRosier, drummer Steve Hamelin, and keyboardist Maddy Wilde. During the 2010s, they were also joined by Andy Lloyd (guitar/keyboards) and Adam Hindle (drums).

Born Ruffians released their debut album Red, Yellow & Blue in 2008, and have since released nine albums in total. Their latest album, Beauty's Pride, was released in 2025.

== History ==
=== Formation, debut records and Red, Yellow & Blue (2000s) ===
The band formed in 2002 when cousins Lalonde and DeRosier met drummer Steve Hamelin at Midland Secondary School. Originally formed under the name Mornington Drive, they self-released an album called Makeshift Metric Catastrophe. In an interview, DeRosier described it as entirely homemade, "It was burned onto CD in Steve's basement, the packaging was sewn by Steve's mom and I think Luke painted the covers."

After renaming themselves Born Ruffians, the band moved from Midland to Toronto in 2004. After some local performances and a growing online reputation, the band was signed to the UK electronic music label Warp Records. They released their self-titled debut EP in 2006. It was recorded by Ryan Mills at Little King Studio (now Sleepytown Sound). They received extensive airplay on CBC Radio 3 with their debut single, "This Sentence Will Ruin/Save Your Life," as well as a cover of Grizzly Bear's single "Knife" which the band recorded live on KEXP.

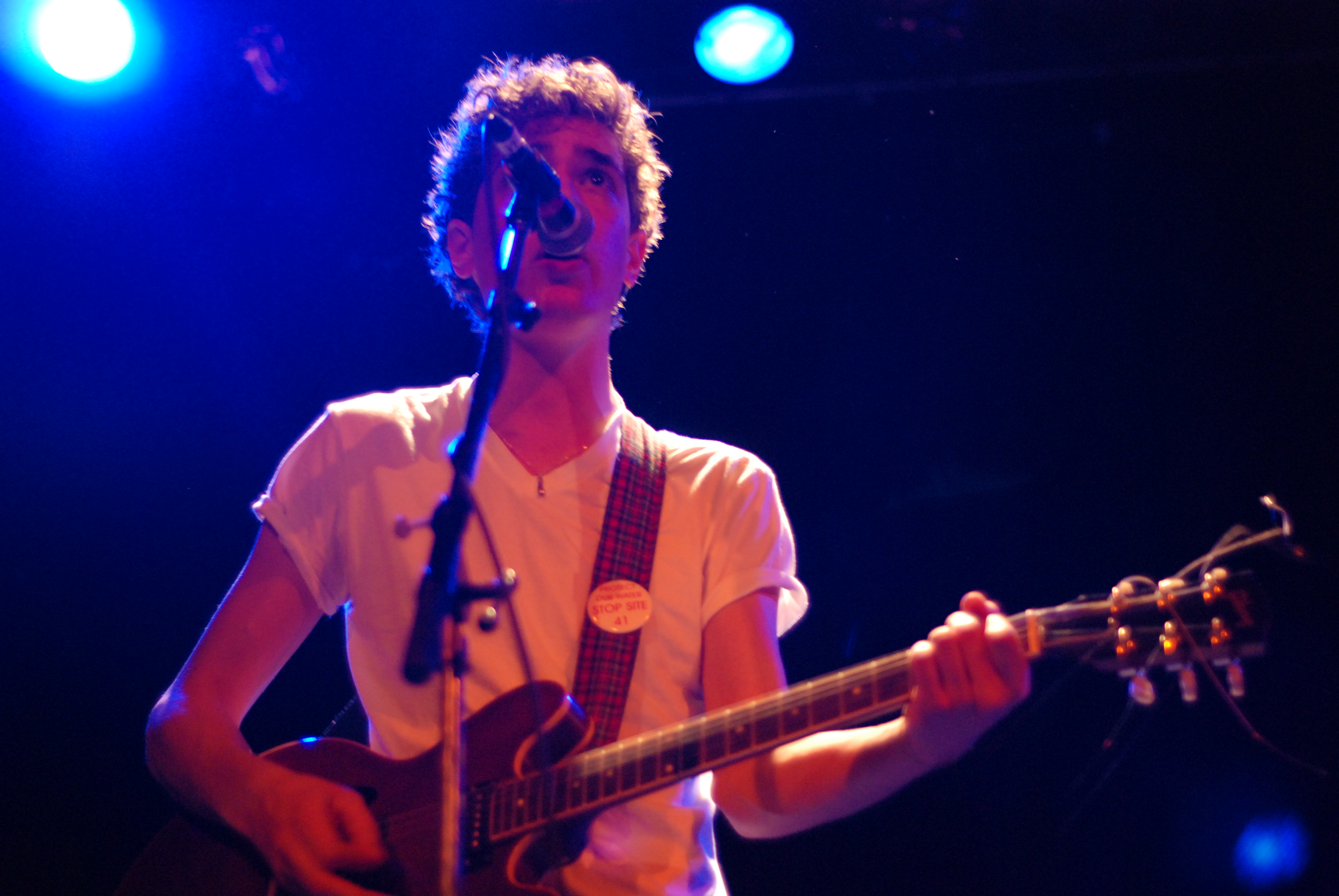
Lead singer Luke Lalonde performing at the Bowery Ballroom in New York City in 2007

In 2007, they released the single "Hummingbird," which was included on their first album Red, Yellow & Blue. Born Ruffians' Red, Yellow & Blue was nominated in the 8th Annual Independent Music Awards for Pop/Rock Album of the year.

In 2009, they recorded a cover of two Aphex Twin songs for Warp20 (Recreated), a compilation.

They appeared in an episode of the second season of British teen drama Skins, playing their song "Hummingbird" in a night club. The song is also featured in a television advert in the UK for Orange mobile telecommunications' "Animal" campaign. "Hummingbird" is also featured in a car advertisement in Australia. The band was featured in episode seven of the comedic web series, Nirvana the Band the Show, playing as themselves as they rehearse with a new member of the band. On July 31, 2009, the Born Ruffians played for Nirvana the Band at The Rivoli for the wrap of their web-series. Footage of this show was included in episode ten.

First tours

They toured with Franz Ferdinand, Caribou, Peter Bjorn and John, Hot Chip, The Hidden Cameras, Tokyo Police Club (with whom they have also performed songs on stage), and The Honorary Title. They toured Canada (mostly Ontario) throughout April 2008, completing the North American leg of their tour on April 26, 2008, with an album release party at Lee's Palace in Toronto. In May and June 2008, they finished their UK tour and continued touring throughout Europe.

They toured Australia in January and February 2009 as part of St Jerome's Laneway Festival along with Girl Talk, Stereolab, Architecture In Helsinki, The Hold Steady, The Drones, Cut Off Your Hands, Four Tet, Tame Impala, El Guincho, Jay Reatard, Buraka Som Sistema Dj/Mc Set, The Temper Trap, No Age, and more.

=== Say It and Birthmarks (2010–2014) ===
The band's second album, entitled Say It, was released June 1, 2010. The album was recorded at Metalworks Studios in Toronto and mastered at Rusty Santos' studio in Brooklyn. The first single from it was "What To Say" followed by "Nova Leigh" and "Oh Man".

In April 2011, their single "Little Garçon" appeared in an American Express commercial, Real Tweets, which included edited versions of tweets from @activecultures and others.

The band's 2013 album, Birthmarks, was released on April 16 via Paper Bag Records. The band spent roughly three years writing all over the world including several months spent living together in an old farmhouse in rural Ontario. The album was recorded at BoomBox Sound with producer/engineer Roger Leavens and engineer Marcel Ramagnano. Following the record, drummer Hamelin took leave of the band to pursue a degree in history and international relations. Drummer Adam Hindle officially joined the band during the second tour to support Birthmarks. At the 2014 Juno Awards, the band was nominated for Breakthrough Group of the Year.

Lalonde revealed in an interview with Revue Magazine that he has been working on an acoustic Born Ruffians EP since the summer after Birthmarks was released. This acoustic EP was released on the band's website, available for free download. A total of nine tracks were released.

=== RUFF and Uncle, Duke & The Chief (2015–2019) ===
On October 2, 2015, the band released their fourth studio album, RUFF. The band fluctuated between a trio and quartet in the following year, with drummer Hamelin rejoining the band and guitarist Andy Lloyd later leaving, following the birth of his daughter.

Lalonde had an acting role in the 2017 film Sundowners.

Born Ruffians released their fifth studio album Uncle, Duke & The Chief in February 2018. The album was the final record produced by Richard Swift.

In 2018, the band hosted their first ever show for Shondi Festoon. In an interview, DeRosier explained, "Shondi Festoon is the biggest inside joke that we share with our fans. [...] It didn’t feel like us to do a branded holiday kind of thing, so we made up our own holiday."

=== JUICE, SQUEEZE and PULP (2020–2024) ===
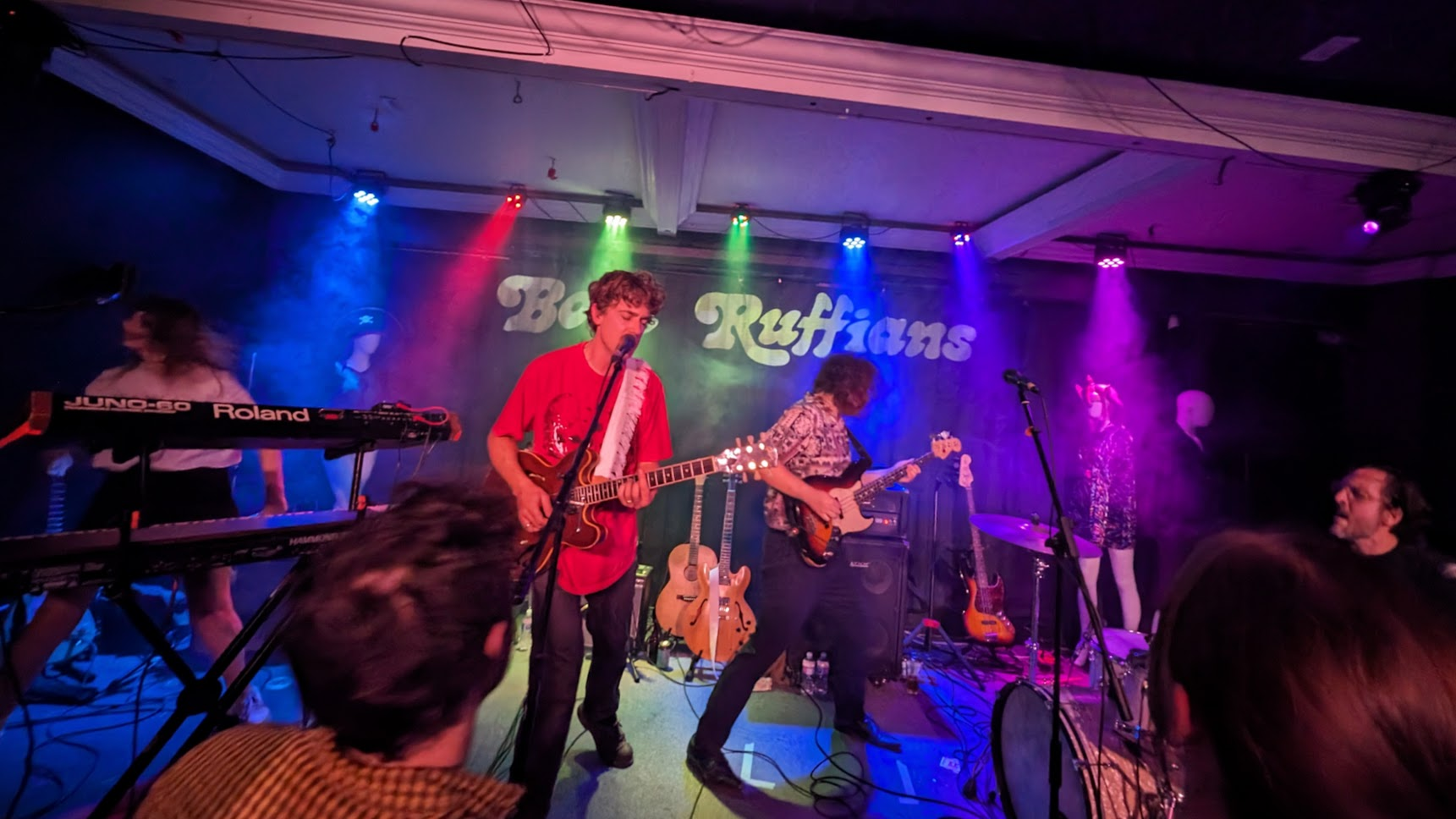
Born Ruffians performing in Windsor, Ontario in 2023

On April 3, 2020, the band released the album JUICE. The album was released on the band's own record label, Wavy Haze Records. The label shares its name with the single "Wavy Haze" off the album JUICE. Its companion SQUEEZE was released later that year on October 2, 2020. On April 16, 2021, the last album of the trilogy was released, PULP. The trilogy of albums was produced by Graham Walsh from band Holy Fuck.

In 2020, the band introduced a fourth member to the group, Maddy Wilde, formerly of the band Moon King, on vocals and keyboards. In an interview, Lalonde says "It feels like Maddy was always meant to be. We've been writing a lot of music together. It's been really great to have her in that process. She has an effortless way of fitting in and playing along. And I love singing with her too."

In 2022, the band released singles "Chrysanthemums" and "Don't Fight The Feeling". In 2023, drummer Steve Hamelin acted in the film BlackBerry.

In 2024, the band joined Tokyo Police Club's final tour and released two new singles. On September 25, they released "What A Ride" and on November 19, they released "Let You Down".

=== Beauty's Pride (2025–present) ===
On May 28, 2025, the short film Beauty's Pride was released. It is described as a cinematic companion to their album Beauty's Pride. The short film was directed by Jared Raab and produced by Peter Dreimanis. The concept for the film was developed in collaboration with Raab, Dreimanis in addition to Leah Fay Goldstein and the band.

On June 6, 2025, the band released their ninth studio album, titled Beauty's Pride. It features the singles "Mean Time", "Supersonic Man", and "Athena", in addition to previously released singles "What A Ride" and "Let You Down".

Lalonde acted alongside Dreimanis and Goldstein in Pavan Moondi's Middle Life, which premiered at the 2025 Calgary International Film Festival. The band also made a cameo appearance in Nirvanna the Band the Show the Movie.

== Band members ==
Current members

- Luke Lalonde – vocals, guitar, keyboards (2002–present)
- Mitch DeRosier – bass guitar (2002–present)
- Steve Hamelin – drums (2002–2009, 2009–2013, 2016–present)
- Maddy Wilde – keyboards, guitar, vocals (2020–present)

Former members

- Andy Lloyd – guitar, keyboards (2010–2018)
- Adam Hindle – drums (2013–2016)

== Discography ==
=== Studio albums ===
List of studio albums, with selected chart positions
Title	Album details	Peak chart positions	
Title	Album details	UK Indie	US Heat.
Red, Yellow & Blue	Released: March 4, 2008; Label: Warp Records, Paper Bag Records; Format: CD, vinyl, digital download	33	—
Say It	Released: June 1, 2010; Label: Warp Records, Paper Bag Records; Format: CD, vinyl, digital download	—	37
Birthmarks	Released: April 16, 2013; Label: Yep Roc Records, Paper Bag Records; Format: CD, vinyl, digital download	—	—
RUFF	Released: October 2, 2015; Label: Yep Roc Records, Paper Bag Records; Format: CD, vinyl, digital download	—	—
Uncle, Duke & The Chief	Released: February 16, 2018; Label: Yep Roc Records, Paper Bag Records; Format: CD, vinyl, digital download	—	—
JUICE	Released: April 3, 2020; Label: Wavy Haze Records, Yep Roc Records; Format: CD, vinyl, digital download	—	—
SQUEEZE	Released: October 2, 2020; Label: Wavy Haze Records, Yep Roc Records; Format: Vinyl, digital download	—	—
PULP	Released: April 16, 2021; Label: Wavy Haze Records, Yep Roc Records; Format: Vinyl, digital download	—	—
Beauty's Pride	Released: June 6, 2025; Label: Wavy Haze Records, Yep Roc Records	—	—
"—" denotes album that did not chart or was not released

=== EPs ===
Title	Details
Born Ruffians EP	Released: 2006; Label: Warp Records; Format: CD, vinyl, digital download
Plinky Plonk EP	Released: 2010; Label: Warp Records, Paper Bag Records; Format: CD, digital download
Acoustics EP	Released: 2014; Label: Paper Bag Records; Format: Digital download
XTRA RUFF	Released: April 22, 2016; Label: Warp Records; Format: Digital

=== Singles ===
Title	Year	Peak chart positions			Album
Title	Year	CAN Rock	UK	UK Indie	Album
"This Sentence Will Ruin/Save Your Life"	2006	—	—	—	Born Ruffians EP
"Piecing It Together"	2006	—	—	—	Born Ruffians EP
"Hummingbird"	2007	—	82	33	Red, Yellow & Blue
"I Need a Life"	2008	—	— (Note: "I Need a Life" did not enter the UK Singles Chart, but peaked at number 80 on the UK Physical Singles Chart Top 100.)	12	Red, Yellow & Blue
"Little Garçon"	2008	—	—	—	Red, Yellow & Blue
"What to Say"	2010	—	— (Note: "What to Say" did not enter the UK Singles Chart, but peaked at number 72 on the UK Physical Singles Chart Top 100.)	—	Say It
"Nova-Leigh"	2010	—	—	—	Say It
"Oh Man"	2010	—	—	—	Say It
"Needle"	2013	—	—	—	Birthmarks
"Slow"	2014	—	—	—	Birthmarks
"We Made It"	2015	—	—	—	RUFF
"When Things Get Pointless I Roll Away"	2015	—	—	—	RUFF
"Don't Live Up"	2015	—	—	—	RUFF
"Love Too Soon"	2017	—	—	—	Uncle, Duke & The Chief
"Forget Me"	2017	—	—	—	Uncle, Duke & The Chief
"Miss You"	2018	—	—	—	Uncle, Duke & The Chief
"I Fall in Love Every Night"	2020	—	—	—	Juice
"Dedication"	2020	—	—	—	Juice
"Wavy Haze"	2020	—	—	—	Juice
"Breathe"	2020	—	—	—	Juice
"30th Century War"	2020	—	—	—	Squeeze
"Waylaid (Edit)"	2020	—	—	—	Squeeze
"Beyond the Lightning"	2021	—	—	—	Pulp
"Checkin' Out"	2021	—	—	—	Pulp
"Chrysanthemums"	2022	—	—	—	Non-album singles
"Don't Fight The Feeling"	2022	—	—	—	Non-album singles
"Oh Cecilia"	2022	—	—	—	Non-album singles
"What A Ride"	2024	38	—	—	Beauty's Pride
"Let You Down"	2024	—	—	—	Beauty's Pride
"Mean Time"	2025	—	—	—	Beauty's Pride
"Supersonic Man"	2025	—	—	—	Beauty's Pride
"Athena"	2025	—	—	—	Beauty's Pride
"—" denotes recording that did not chart or was not released

== See also ==
- List of bands from Canada
- Rock music of Canada
