= Diamond Tongues =

- Film poster
- Directed by: Pavan Moondi; Brian Robertson
- Written by: Pavan Moondi
- Produced by: Sarah Haywood; Brian Robertson; Pavan Moondi
- Starring: Leah Fay Goldstein
- Cinematography: Peter Dreimanis
- Edited by: Pavan Moondi
- Music by: Brendan Canning; Ohad Benchetrit
- Production companies: Draper Street Films; Daylight on Mars
- Distributed by: Mongrel Media
- Release dates: January 25, 2015 (Slamdance); August 7, 2015 (Canada)
- Running time: 100 minutes
- Country: Canada
- Language: English

Diamond Tongues is a 2015 Canadian comedy-drama film directed by Pavan Moondi and Brian Robertson. It stars July Talk band member Leah Fay Goldstein as a Toronto-based struggling actress who descends into a downward spiral of depression, narcissism and cruelty.

== Plot ==
Toronto-based Edith Welland is an aspiring actress willing to do whatever it takes to land a film role, even outright lying, sabotaging other actresses and outright disrespecting her former boyfriend, also an aspiring actor. Throughout the film, it is revealed she might suffer from manic depressive disorders and delusional psychosis.

== Cast ==
- Leah Fay Goldstein as Edith Welland
- Nick Flanagan as Nick
- Leah Wildman as Clare
- Adam Gurfinkel as Ben
- David John Phillips as Derek Neville
- Noah R. Taylor as Christian
- Ryan Wonsiak as Dmitri
- Brendan Hobin as Jason
- Ashley Tredenick as Suzanne
- Bo Martyn as Danielle
- Julian Peter as Darren
- Catherine Stockhausen as Laura
- Matt Hansen as Matt Hansen
- Caley Jones as Receptionist
- Julian Carrington as Nate
- Matt Johnson as John Matheson

== Production ==
Goldstein's July Talk bandmate Peter Dreimanis was involved in the film production, as the film's cinematographer.

== Release ==
Diamond Tongues premiered at the Slamdance Film Festival in Park City, Utah on January 25, 2015, and was acquired by Mongrel Media for distribution in Canada and by Factory 25 for the United States. It had a limited theatrical release in Canada on August 7, 2015.

=== Critical reception ===
On the review aggregator website Rotten Tomatoes, 100% of 10 critics' reviews are positive. Metacritic, which uses a weighted average, assigned the film a score of 75 out of 100, based on seven critics, indicating "generally favorable" reviews.

Norman Wilner of Now calls the script "sharp and thoughtful." The Hollywood Reporter's Frank Scheck praises the film as "a vivid depiction of the city's arts scene," adding, "with the soundtrack consisting of songs by such indie rock bands as Islands and Broken Social Scene adding greatly to the overall atmosphere."

=== Accolades ===
Goldstein was nominated for Best Actress at the 4th Canadian Screen Awards, held on March 13, 2016.
