= July Talk =

Canadian alternative rock band

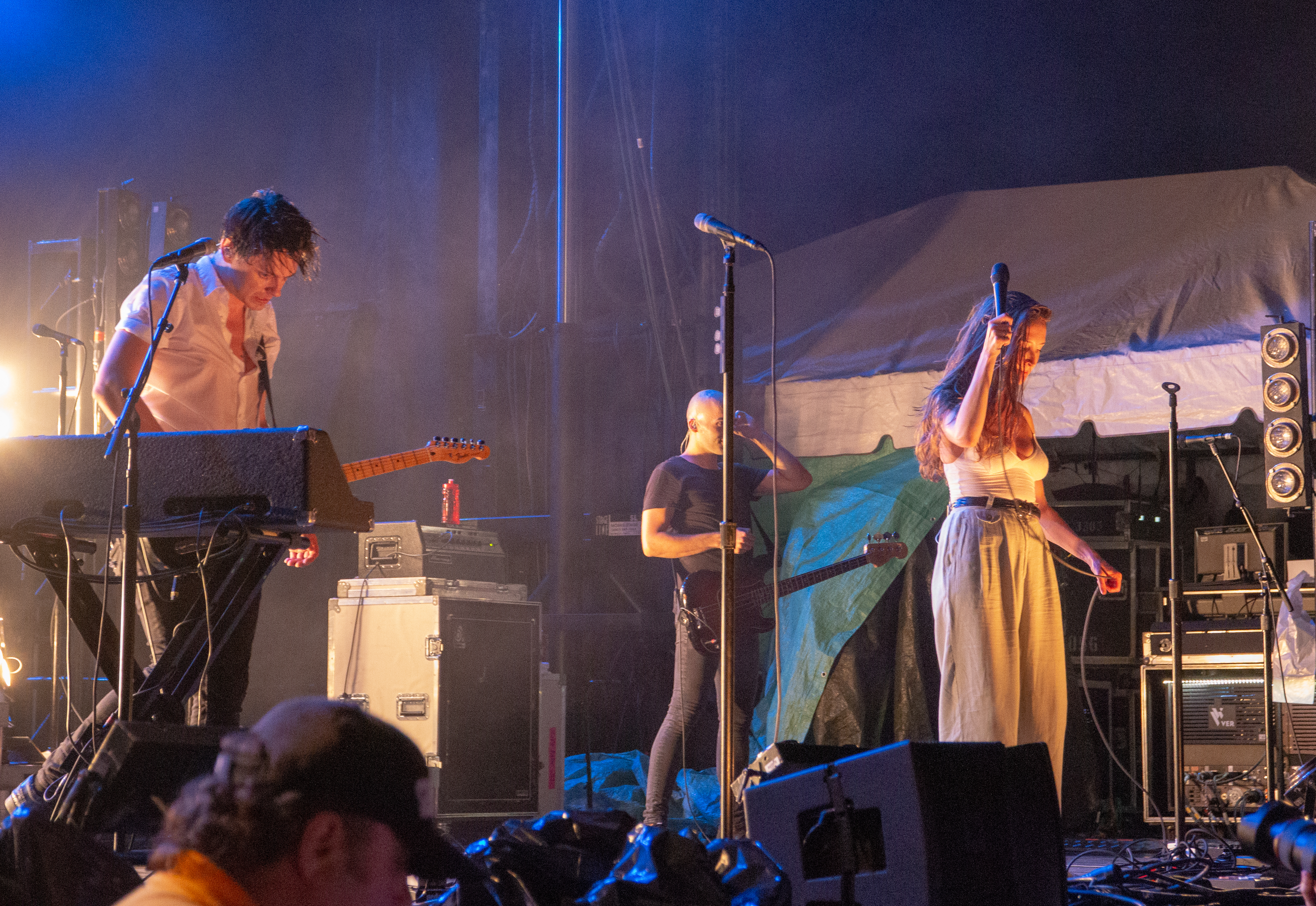
- July Talk at Riverfest Elora 2018

Background information
- Origin: Toronto, Ontario, Canada
- Genres: Indie rock; blues rock; alternative rock
- Years active: 2012–present
- Labels: Six Shooter Sleepless (CAN); Island (US); Universal (UK)
- Members: Peter Dreimanis; Leah Fay Goldstein; Josh Warburton; Danny Miles; Dani Nash
- Past members: Eamon McGrath; Ian Docherty
- Website: julytalk.com

July Talk is a Canadian alternative rock band formed in 2012 in Toronto, Ontario. The band consists of singers Peter Dreimanis and Leah Fay Goldstein, guitarist Ian Docherty, bassist Josh Warburton, drummer Danny Miles and auxiliary musician Dani Nash. The band has also performed and recorded music with artists Kyla Charter and James Baley. July Talk released its self-titled debut album with Sleepless Records on 16 October 2012 and its second album Touch on 9 September 2016.

Universal Music Canada released an extended version of the album in 2013. July Talk received a Juno Award for Alternative Album of the Year in 2015. The album went gold in Canada the same year. It was released to American audiences in the spring of 2015 through Island Records, and was joined by an EP in Canada titled For Your Bloodshot Eyes.

With a reputation for explosive live shows, July Talk has found most of their following on the road. Since the release of their debut album, they have toured Canada, the United States, Europe, and Australia, and played numerous festivals, including the WayHome Music and Arts Festival near Toronto, Ontario; Shaky Knees Music Festival in Atlanta, Georgia; Voodoo Music + Arts Experience in New Orleans, Louisiana; Osheaga in Montreal, Quebec; Isle of Wight Festival in the UK; and Austin City Limits Music Festival in Austin, Texas.

The band's second album, Touch, was released on 9 September 2016 by Sleepless Records in Canada, Island Records in the United States and Universal Music Group/Vertigo Records in Europe. "Push + Pull", the album's first single, held the #1 spot on the Canadian Alternative Radio charts for thirteen weeks in 2016 and was released on American Alternative Radio in September 2016.

== Biography ==
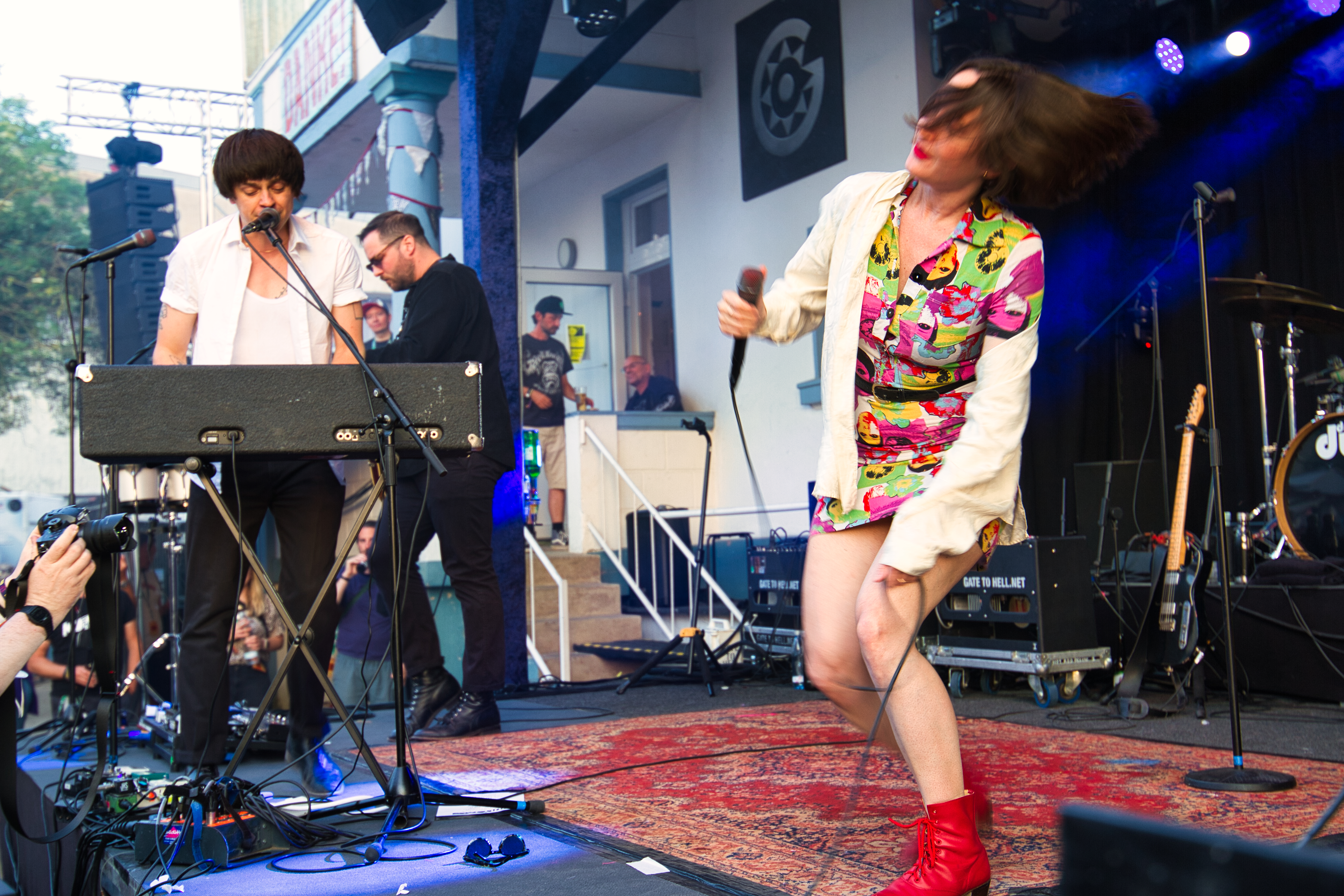
July Talk at Orange Blossom Special Festival, 2022

In 2010, Latvian-Canadian singer Peter Dreimanis approached Leah Fay Goldstein after hearing her sing with art/folk group Mothers of Brides at The Communist's Daughter, a bar in Toronto. Dreimanis had just returned to the city following a European tour with The Mohawk Lodge and Eamon McGrath. Dreimanis and Goldstein began to record demos together, and soon formed July Talk with McGrath, Josh Warburton and Danny Miles. Eight months later, McGrath left the band to focus on his own material and was replaced by Ian Docherty.

Goldstein, the daughter of Toronto Sun columnist Lorrie Goldstein, was usually credited as Leah Fay in the band's earlier years, but has more recently used her full name.

The band's ten-song debut album was released on 16 October 2012, by Sleepless Records. An extended version was released a year later in collaboration with Universal Music Canada. The extended version included four additional songs: "Summer Dress," "My Neck," "Black Lace," and "Headsick." In early 2015, the band recorded three additional songs for an American release with Island Records: "Gentleman," "Blood + Honey," and "Uninvited." These three songs were also released on a Canadian EP entitled For Your Bloodshot Eyes.

In 2013, after releasing their debut album, they toured with Billy Talent, Matt Mays, Arkells, Sam Roberts, The Besnard Lakes, Weezer, Matthew Good, and Tegan and Sara. July Talk was nominated for Breakthrough Group of the Year at the 2014 Juno Awards in Canada. During the live broadcast they presented the award for Group of the Year to Canadian Artists Tegan and Sara, alongside Canadian Rap Artist Shad. In 2015, July Talk won a Juno for Alternative Album of the Year for their debut album July Talk. They have since opened for bands such as Spoon, Red Hot Chili Peppers, Weezer, Alabama Shakes, Frank Turner, Against Me!, and The National.

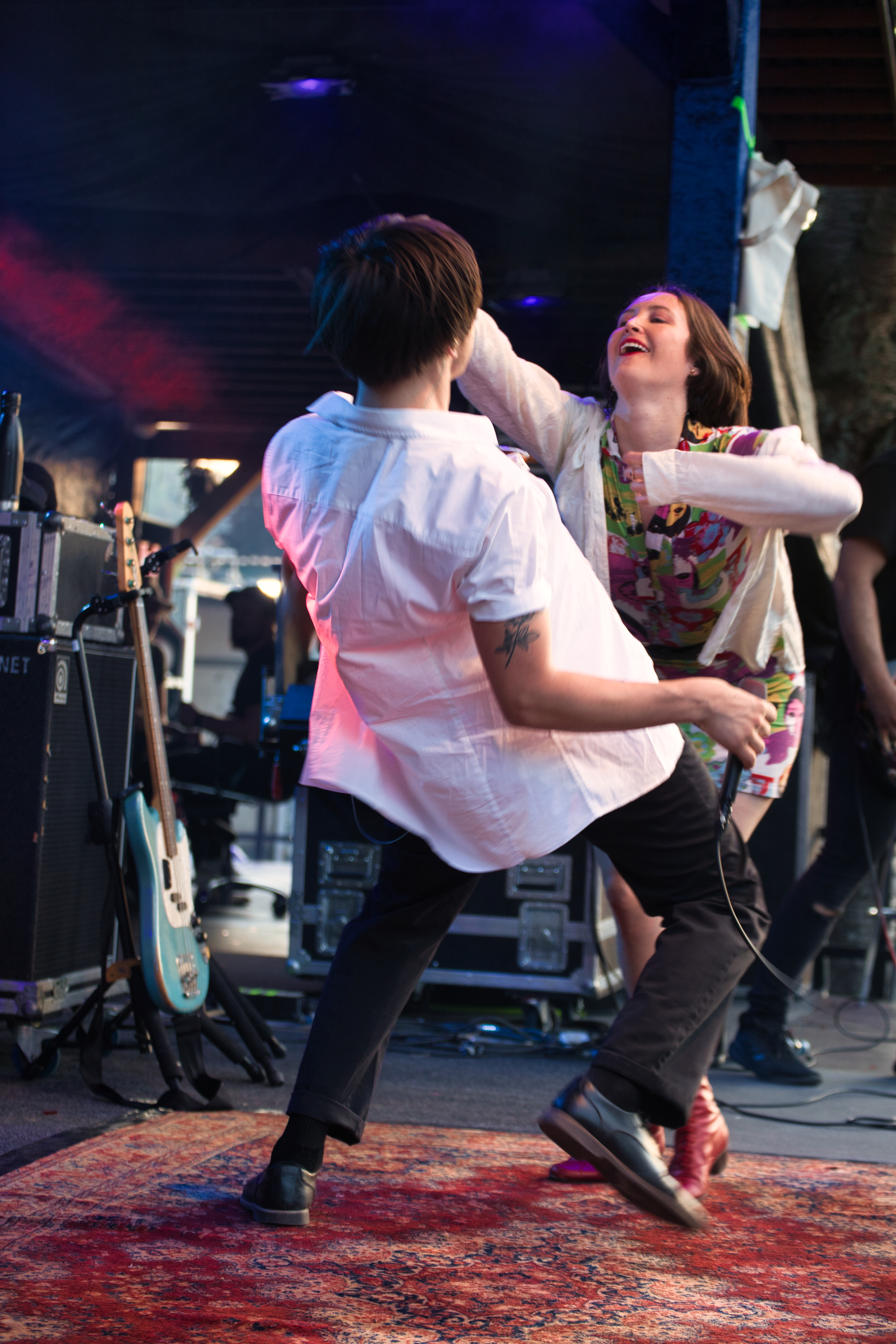
Leah Fay Goldstein and Peter Dreimanis, 2022

In 2015, Dreimanis and Goldstein created July Talk Votes to encourage young voters to participate in the Canadian federal election. More than 1000 voters under 25 tweeted a photo of themselves at a polling station and received a phone call from the band thanking them for their involvement.

Goldstein had the lead role in the 2015 film Diamond Tongues. She received a Canadian Screen Award nomination for Best Actress at the 4th Canadian Screen Awards in 2016. She also had a smaller acting role in Sundowners, the 2017 film by Diamond Tongues director Pavan Moondi.

Peter Dreimanis is also known for his cover of Creedence Clearwater Revival's classic, "Bad Moon Rising" which was used in multiple television shows, films and video games such as The Walking Dead, Green Room, and Teen Wolf. The cover was released under the moniker Mourning Ritual. He has also had a number of film credits as a cinematographer, including both Diamond Tongues and Sundowners.

The band's first three studio albums won the Juno Award for Alternative Album of the Year.

In 2017, the band began putting up posters at their shows titled "Love Lives Here". The posters are put up to help ensure that fans feel they have a safe space at the concerts they are attending- and ones free from sexism, racism, homophobia, ableism, and sexual assault. That year, the band removed itself from dates supporting Nothing but Thieves, who had sexual assault allegations leveled against them. "We can no longer participate due to accounts we've read online of misconduct," they said.

An August 2020 concert, performed by the band at a drive-in venue due to the COVID-19 pandemic in Canada, was filmed by Brittany Farhat for the documentary concert film July Talk: Love Lives Here, which premiered at the 2023 Hot Docs Canadian International Documentary Festival.

In 2024, Dreimanis released "Keep Me Free", his debut single with the side project Peter Dreams. A full Peter Dreams album was released in February 2025.

He had an acting role in Sinners by Ryan Coogler, and contributed to two songs, "Pick Poor Robin Clean" and "Will Ye Go, Lassie Go?", from the film's soundtrack.

Goldstein and Dreimanis both played leading roles in Moondi's film Middle Life, which premiered at the 2025 Calgary International Film Festival.

In November 2025, July Talk announced an upcoming 2026 Canadian tour to celebrate 10 years of their record Touch. They also announced they would be releasing Touch X, a newly recorded anniversary edition of their pivotal album. Through an Instagram post, they later revealed that Touch X would be a double album, including a previously unreleased body of work titled Love's Not Dead, which they recorded at the same time as Touch in 2016 but decided not to release then. The band believed the songs on Love's Not Dead were too revealing of themselves as people, and at the time wanted to preserve some mystery over their band's image.

== Discography ==
=== Studio albums ===
- July Talk (2012)
- Touch (2016)
- Pray for It (2020)
- Remember Never Before (2023)
- Touch X/Love's Not Dead (2026)

July Talk was released on 15 October 2012 by Sleepless Records. An extended version, containing three new songs, was released in 2013. Louis Roberts of CultureFly credits the album as "a tour de force in how to refresh a genre," adding, "the debut album from July Talk is an aggressive, assertive and irresistibly mischievous slice of 21st century blues-rock."

On 30 September 2014, July Talk released an EP titled For Your Bloodshot Eyes, which brought the three new songs included in the extended American album to their Canadian audience. When reviewing the album, Alyson Shane of The Spill Magazine wrote, "For Your Bloodshot Eyes serves two purposes: to continue to showcase the band’s exceptional talent, and to reaffirm that they are on the cusp of absolutely exploding in popularity. It is a must-hear."

On 9 September 2016, July Talk released their second album, Touch.

On 10 July 2020, July Talk released their third studio album, Pray for It, via Sleepless Records/BMG.

On 20 January 2023, July Talk released their fourth studio album, Remember Never Before, via Six Shooter Records. In December they followed up with Solstice, a five-song EP collecting cover versions of songs by James, Wilco, FKA twigs, Mclusky and Floyd Crow Westerman that they had recorded over the past decade for release as one-off non-album singles.

=== Singles ===
Title	Year	Peak chart positions	Album
Title	Year	CAN Rock	Album
"Paper Girl"	2012	—	July Talk
"Let Her Know"	2012	—	July Talk
"Guns + Ammunition"	2013	8	July Talk
"Headsick"	2014	24	July Talk
"Summer Dress"	2014	34	July Talk
"The Garden"	2015	28	July Talk
"Push + Pull"	2016	1	Touch
"Picturing Love"	2016	2	Touch
"Beck + Call"	2017	5	Touch
"Lola + Joseph"	2017	3	Touch
"Pay for It"	2020	—	Pray For It
"Governess Shadow"	2020	8	Pray For It
"Identical Love"	2020	—	Pray For It
"The News"	2020	14	Pray For It
"I Am Water"	2021	10	Remember Never Before
"Certain Father" (featuring Spencer Krug)	2022	3	Remember Never Before
"When You Stop"	2023	20	Remember Never Before
"G-d Mother Fire"	2023	40	Remember Never Before

=== Music videos ===
Before forming July Talk, Dreimanis and Warburton ran Vulture Culture Films, a Toronto-based music video production company. Both brought their creative expertise to July Talk, staying closely involved in the direction, editing, and production of the band's distinctive videos.

Goldstein has a BFA in contemporary dance from Concordia University in Montreal, and co-founded performance art collective WIVES. She choreographed the video for the band's number one single, "Push + Pull".

Title	Director	Director of Photography	Editor	Producer
"Paper Girl"	Peter Dreimanis, Josh Warburton	Adam Crosby	Peter Dreimanis	Peter Dreimanis
"Let Her Know"	Josh Warburton	Adam Crosby	Peter Dreimanis	Peter Dreimanis
"Guns + Ammunition"	Josh Warburton	Adam Crosby	–	Peter Dreimanis
"Summer Dress"	Josh Warburton	Adam Crosby	Peter Dreimanis	Peter Dreimanis
"The Garden"	Evan Morgan	Adam Crosby	–	Peter Dreimanis
"Push + Pull"	Nadia Tan	Adam Crosby, Maya Bankovic, Mike McLaughlin	Nadia Tan	Peter Dreimanis
"Beck + Call"	Jared Raab, Norah Sadava, Amy Nostbakken	Adam Crosby	–	Nicole Powell, Katy Maravala, Peter Dreimanis
"Picturing Love"	Jared Raab	–	Jared Raab	Peter Dreimanis
