= Martha Baillie =

Canadian poet and novelist (born 1960)

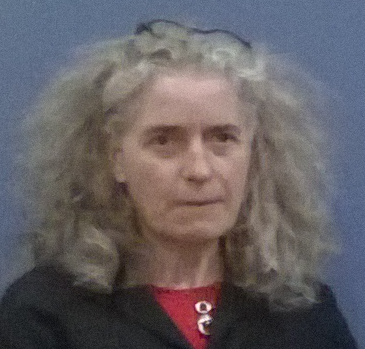
Martha Baillie

Martha Baillie (born 1960) is a Canadian poet and novelist.

== Biography ==
Baillie was born in Toronto, Ontario. She studied history, French and Russian at the University of Edinburgh, and completed her studies at the Sorbonne, Paris and the University of Toronto. It was there that she became involved in theatre. In 1981, after an extended trip through Asia, she decided to shift her focus from acting to writing. After her return – and a brief interlude as a French immersion and ESL teacher – she took up a position at the Toronto Public Library where she is currently employed. Her writing has been published in Canada, Germany and Hungary.

Her most popular novel to date is The Shape I Gave You (2006), listed as a national bestseller by Maclean's magazine in May 2006.

In The Incident Report (2009), Baillie uses the format of 144 short reports to recount incidents from her own experiences as a librarian. As a work of fiction the novel contains conventional elements such as "a love story and a mystery"; as a report, it presents a subtext depicting "how Toronto libraries have become a refuge for the city's marginalized".The Incident Report was longlisted for the 2009 Scotiabank Giller Prize, and was later adapted to film as Darkest Miriam in 2024.

Besides five novels, Baillie has had poems published in journals including Descant, Prairie Fire and The Antigonish Review. Other literary work includes a treatment on The Legacy of Joseph Wagenbach, an installation environment by Iris Häussler, first published in Brick in 2007.

Her book There Is No Blue won the Hilary Weston Writers' Trust Prize for Nonfiction in 2024.

She lives in Toronto.

== Selected works ==
- My Sister, Esther. Turnstone Press, Winnipeg 1995 ISBN 978-0-88801-200-5
- Madame Balashovskaya's Apartment. Turnstone Press, Winnipeg 1999 ISBN 978-0-88801-235-7
- The Shape I Gave You. Knopf Canada, 2006 ISBN 978-0-676-97748-6
- The Incident Report. Pedlar Press, Toronto 2009 ISBN 978-1-897141-25-0
- The search for Heinrich Schlögel : a novel, Pedlar Press, St. John's, 2014 ISBN 9781897141632
- La disparition d'Heinrich Schlögel, roman. Trad. de l'anglais: Paule Noyât. Éditions Jacqueline Chambon, Arles 2017 ISBN 9782330075897; Leméac, Montreal 2017 ISBN 9782760947221 (A novel about Samuel Hearne). Shortlisted 2017 Governor General's Awards, Category Translation English-French
- If Clara. Coach House Books, Toronto, 2017 ISBN 9781552453568
- Sister Language. Pedlar Press, St. John's, 2019 ISBN 9781552453568
- There is No Blue. Coach House Books, Toronto, 2023 ISBN 9781552454749
