= Eamon McGrath =

Canadian musician

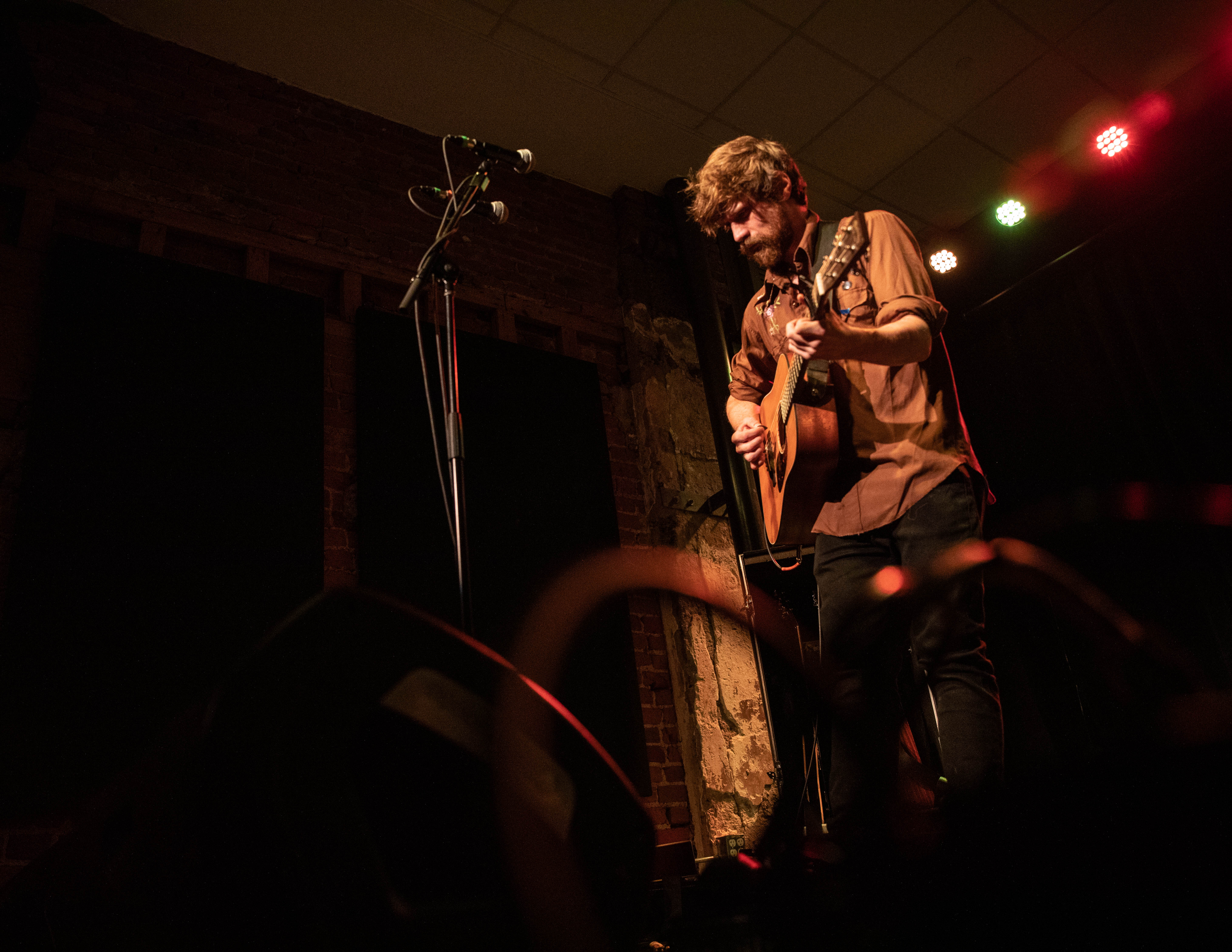
- Eamon McGrath performing live in Hamilton, ON, Canada, 2023

Background information
- Born: Edmonton, Alberta, Canada
- Genres: Punk rock, indie rock, folk
- Years active: 2006–present
- Website: eamonmcgrath.ca

Eamon McGrath is a Canadian musician and writer from Edmonton, Alberta and currently based in Windsor, Ontario. On his own, his live performances are most often folk-oriented, where McGrath plays songs from his discography on acoustic instruments. However, with a band the live show takes on a much more high-energy, punk rock influenced vein.

== Career ==
McGrath began recording on his own at his home in Toronto. In late 2008, he signed with White Whale Records. That year, he also began a rigid touring schedule which has continued for over ten years.

McGrath and White Whale released the album Peace Maker, which appeared on the !Earshot National Top 50 Chart in October 2010.

Young Canadians was released on April 10, 2012. The record is produced by David Carswell and John Collins of The Evaporators.

In 2012, McGrath performed at Sackville, New Brunswick's Sappyfest 7 with Chris Thompson, Julie Doiron and Mark Gaudet of Eric's Trip playing songs from Young Canadians. McGrath also plays guitar in Julie & The Wrong Guys, featuring Julie Doiron and Cancer Bats members Mike Peters and Jaye Schwarzer.

Exile, the follow-up to Young Canadians, was released in the form of three separate digital EPs over the course of nine months, concluding with a full LP in September 2014. Exile - Part One was released on October 15, 2013, followed by the second instalment in March, 2014 while the full-length conclusion was released digitally and in LP format on September 9, 2014. A Canadian and European tour followed. Alongside Dan Mangan, Rae Spoon and Gavin Gardiner of The Wooden Sky, McGrath scored music for North Country Cinema's feature film The Valley Below, which premiered at the Toronto International Film Festival in September, 2014.

On October 21, 2014, Toronto's New Damage Records released a split 7-inch by Eamon McGrath and Edmonton-based punk band SLATES, where both artists cover each other's material.

McGrath's first book, a fictionalized tour memoir entitled Berlin-Warszawa Express, was released in spring 2017 by ECW Press. In the same year, the debut album from Julie Doiron & The Wrong Guys was released on Dine Alone Records. McGrath's sixth full-length record, Tantramar, was released June 1, 2018 on Saved By Vinyl. The follow-up to Tantramar, Guts, was released on September 6, 2019, on Saved By Vinyl and Uncle M Music.

In March 2020, McGrath released the online-only digital full-length The Long Hard Road coinciding with the outbreak of the COVID-19 pandemic. His second book, Here Goes Nothing, was released on ECW Press in September of the same year.

McGrath played over 80 shows across Canada in 2021. Bells of Hope, the follow-up to Guts, was released on February 25, 2022. On December 31, 2022, McGrath released 7 albums of new material via his Cassettes Records imprint. The albums were recorded in collaboration remotely with Danny Miles of July Talk from 2020 to 2021. The all-acoustic A Dizzying Lust was released on Cassettes Records / Saved By Vinyl on March 31, followed by subsequent touring. While on tour supporting A Dizzying Lust, McGrath began releasing the limited edition CD series Lust Never Sleeps, compiled from live recordings and field recordings from the tour. On April 27, McGrath released the collaborative Roaming EP, with Brussels-based experimental folk artist The Hills Mover on Iskra Cassettes, making it his eleventh release of the year.

== Discography ==
- Wild Dogs (Champion City Records, 2008)
- 13 Songs of Whiskey and Light (White Whale, 2009)
- Peace Maker (White Whale, 2010)
- Young Canadians (White Whale, 2012)
- Pegasus (Independent, 2013)
- Exile (Aporia, 2014)
- Tantramar (Saved By Vinyl, 2018)
- Guts (Saved By Vinyl, Uncle M Music, 2019)
- The Long Hard Road (Saved By Vinyl, 2020)
- Range Roads OST (Saved By Vinyl, 2022)
- Bells of Hope (Saved By Vinyl, 2022)
- Death & Taxes (Cassettes Records, 2022)
- Fireworks & Roses (Cassettes Records, 2022)
- Ghosts of the 401 (Cassettes Records, 2022)
- In The Valley Of The Shadow Of Death (Cassettes Records, 2022)
- March 22, 2022 (Cassettes Records, 2022)
- Liar's Paradise (Cassettes Records, 2022)
- Trout River Conspiracy (Cassettes Records, 2022)
- A Dizzying Lust (Cassettes Records / Saved By Vinyl, 2023)
- Lust Never Sleeps, Vol. 1 (Cassettes Records, 2023)
- Lust Never Sleeps, Vol. 2 (Cassettes Records, 2023)
- Lust Never Sleeps, Vol. 3 (Cassettes Records, 2023)
- Roaming EP w/ The Hills Mover (Iskra Cassettes, 2023)
- Lust Never Sleeps, Vol. 4 w/ Jacob Audrey Taves (Cassettes Records, 2023)
- Lust Never Sleeps, Vol. 5 (Cassettes Records, 2023)
- Lust Never Sleeps, Vol. 6 (Cassettes Records, 2025)
- Jet Lag (w/ Oldseed, Cassettes Records, 2025)
- Analog Requiem For A Digital World (2005-2025) (Cassettes Records, 2026)
- Electric Lust (Cassettes Records, 2026)

== Books ==
- Berlin-Warszawa Express (ECW Press, 2017)
- Here Goes Nothing (ECW Press, 2020)
