= Red, Yellow & Blue =

Studio album by Born Ruffians
- Released: March 4, 2008
- Studio: Chemical Sound and Sleepytown Studio in Toronto, Ontario
- Genre: Indie rock, post-punk revival
- Length: 39:24
- Label: Warp
- Producer: Rusty Santos

Born Ruffians chronology
Born Ruffians EP (2006)	Red, Yellow & Blue (2008)	Say It (2010)

Professional ratings
Review scores
Source	Rating
AllMusic	3/5 stars
Filter	8.8/10
Pitchfork Media	8.0/10
Spin	6/10

Red, Yellow & Blue is the debut album by the indie-rock band Born Ruffians. It was released on March 4, 2008, in the United States and Canada and May 26 in the UK/Europe. "Hummingbird" was the first single off the album, followed by "Foxes Mate for Life". The band teamed up with Rusty Santos, collaborator for Animal Collective and Grizzly Bear, to produce this album. It was recorded at Chemical Sound in Toronto, except the track "Hedonistic Me," which was recorded at Sleepytown Studio (Toronto).

== Track listing ==
1. "Red, Yellow & Blue" – 2:32
2. "Barnacle Goose" – 3:39
3. "Hummingbird" – 3:08
4. "I Need a Life" – 3:27
5. "Little Garçon" – 4:10
6. "Badonkadonkey" – 2:57
7. "Foxes Mate for Life" – 4:30
8. "Hedonistic Me" – 2:40
9. "In a Mirror" – 3:05
10. "Kurt Vonnegut" – 4:04
11. "Red Elephant" – 5:19
