= Rabo Karabekian =

Fictional character in the novel Bluebeard

- First appearance: Breakfast of Champions (1973)
- Last appearance: Bluebeard (1987)
- Created by: Kurt Vonnegut

In-universe information
- Gender: Male
- Occupation: Artist
- Spouse: Dorothy (divorced); Edith Taft
- Children: Terry and Henri
- Nationality: American

Rabo Karabekian is a fictional character and the narrator and protagonist of the 1987 novel Bluebeard by American author Kurt Vonnegut. Karabekian is an abstract expressionist artist who appears first in the 1973 novel Breakfast of Champions as the artist of the $50,000 painting The Temptation of Saint Anthony. Vonnegut's 1987 novel Bluebeard is largely a fictional autobiography of Karabekian, and is told primarily as a first person narrative.

== Fictional biography ==
"Reproduction" of The Temptation of Saint Anthony.

Karabekian was born in 1916. His parents were survivors of the Armenian genocide. They moved to San Ignacio, California, where young Rabo's talent as an artist became apparent. However, although capable of incredible photorealism, his teacher generally felt his work had no soul (that is, it failed to invoke an emotional response in the viewer). His father was a cobbler who did repairs until he became obsessed with making elaborate cowboy boots. His mother worked in a cannery and died of a tetanus infection when Rabo was 12 years old.

Before the war, Karabekian wrote to the famous artist Dan Gregory (born Gregorian), showing him his paintings and begging Gregory to mentor Karabekian. Karabekian instead ends up in a relationship with Gregory's assistant Marilee Kemp, who ships Karabekian expensive paints and materials. After Karabekian mails a painting made with the new paints to Gregory, in a rage, Gregory realizes the paintings were made with his paints, and in a drunken rage hits Kemp down the stairs, breaking her legs. Gregory, realizing he could be arrested, tells Kemp she can have one thing she wants as long as she doesn't press charges. Kemp, revealed to be Gregory's mistress instead of his assistant, tells Dan to mentor Karabekian, which he does. Karabekian is later fired after Gregory finds he and Kemp had been sneaking off to the Museum of Modern Art. Although remaining close friends with Karabekian, the older Kemp ends their affair, and remains with the abusive Gregory because he is her provider.

As a young man, he joined the Army to serve in World War II and because of his artistic skills was assigned to a camouflage unit. Unfortunately, while in service near the front, his position was overrun, costing him an eye, over which he wore a patch for the rest of his life. While recovering from his injury at a military hospital, Karabekian met Dorothy, a nurse. They later married, moved to New York City, and had two sons. The two agreed that Rabo would become a businessman to better provide for their family. However, Rabo began neglecting his family to drink at bars with other expressionist artists, and Dorothy eventually leaves him and takes their sons with her. Karabekian later remarries the widowed Edith Taft, grand-niece of former president William Howard Taft, and they remain married for 20 years until her death from a heart attack.

After the war, Karabekian became friends with many abstract expressionists, including Jackson Pollock. Karabekian was able to make some money selling paintings he had bought from civilians during the war and, unlike his friends, was able to support himself while pursuing his art. He could pay other artists' bills, and they paid their debt in art. As a result, he eventually accumulated the world's largest private collection of abstract expressionist works.

Karabekian did have major commissions of his own, including murals. Rejecting his photorealistic roots, his works tended to be abstract, consisting of a revolutionary house paint called Sateen Dura-Luxe on canvas as the background, topped with colored tape. Although he claimed the works were completely abstract, he admitted to himself that the tape represented the aura of living creatures on a landscape. Unfortunately, his choice of materials was a poor one - the not-so-revolutionary Sateen Dura-Luxe and tape eventually fell off, essentially destroying all of his work over time. Sateen Dura-Luxe turned out to be highly toxic when exposed to air, so his leftover stock sits in his basement.

As Karabekian's better-known work looked very simple, many of his friends doubted he had real artistic talent. However, when he was in the mood, he could paint photographically and spent years apprenticing with Dan Gregory, an illustrator. During the preparation of one of his works, he proved his talent to a friend by caricaturing him in dust smeared on canvas.

Karabekian's "secret" in Bluebeard is held in a large old potato barn building on his estate that he never lets anyone enter.

The Temptation of Saint Anthony costs $50,000 and is solid green with one thin, vertical, Day-Glo orange strip of tape. He was met with resentment by people in the book who felt that the purchase of his painting was a waste of money. Karabekian defends the painting at the end of Vonnegut's 1973 novel Breakfast of Champions as a representation of the only pristine element of humanity: "their awareness". Karabekian further describes his views in Bluebeard as seeing every person as a thin and bright neon tube representing their soul and their awareness.

Karabekian's The Temptation of Saint Anthony also appears in Vonnegut's 1982 novel Deadeye Dick.

== The Secret ==
Throughout the novel Bluebeard it is mentioned that Karabekian is housing a secret item inside the potato barn on his property. Eventually, after the insistence of Circe Berman, Karabekian reveals that inside the barn is his last painting, named "Now It's the Women's Turn," which he intended to be shown after his death. The painting is an enormous photo-realistic picture of Karabekian's experience of World War Two where he and five thousand two hundred eighteen other prisoners of war, gypsies, and concentration camp survivors were dumped in a valley when the German forces realized that the war was lost. The painting, which becomes enormously successful as a tourist attraction, is meant to be the only painting that Karabekian created which contained "soul."

== Reception ==
Susan Farrell notes that Karabekian's existence itself begins in tragedy, as his parents met as victims of a genocide. He grows up with a father who has given up on life after losing most of his friends and family, and his more optimistic mother dies when Karabekian is still young. Farrell suggests Karabekian and the women throughout his life incorporate gender disparity in Bluebeard, stating "Rabo's relationships with the various women in his life suggest a longing for nurturing and balance". The grief over his wife's death leads Karabekian to paint his masterpiece, and revealing the painting to the world with help from Berman is symbolic of his rebirth. Karabekian also comes to value both expressionist and realistic art. David Rampton notes that the novel ends with Karabekian turning his mansion into "a museum that serves as a commentary on the art history that the novel explores".

== Appearances in Vonnegut's novels ==
- Breakfast of Champions (1973)
- Deadeye Dick (1982) (mentioned)
- Bluebeard (1987)

== Sources ==
- Farrell, Susan (2009). Critical Companion to Kurt Vonnegut. New York: Facts On File. ISBN 978-0-8160-6598-1.
