= God Bless You, Mr. Rosewater =

1965 novel by Kurt Vonnegut

- Cover of first edition (Hardcover)
- Author: Kurt Vonnegut
- Cover artist: Wayne Anderson (1972)
- Genre: Postmodernism; political satire
- Published: April 5, 1965 (Holt, Rinehart and Winston); 1972 (Panther Books)
- Pages: 218

God Bless You, Mr. Rosewater, or Pearls Before Swine, Kurt Vonnegut's fifth novel, was published on April 5, 1965, by Holt, Rinehart and Winston. A piece of postmodern satire, it gave context to Vonnegut's following novel, Slaughterhouse-Five, and shared in its success.

== Themes and intertextuality ==
Vonnegut's fifth novel, God Bless You, Mr. Rosewater, followed a series with science-fictional subjects. This one, though it features science-fictional writing, is a postmodernist satire based on a humanistic premise. The thesis there is so blatant that the notice in The New York Times opens with the opinion that it "really requires the services of a social historian rather than a book reviewer". One of its targets is the economic inequality resulting from what the book describes as the "savage and stupid and entirely inappropriate and unnecessary and humorless American class system". At the center of the story is the conscience-stricken multi-millionaire Eliot Rosewater, who moves the Rosewater Foundation that he heads to the former family home in Rosewater, Indiana, "where he attempts to dispense unlimited amounts of love and limited sums of money to anyone who will come to his office."

The science-fiction writer Kilgore Trout, who makes his appearance at the end of the novel and is referenced by Eliot Rosewater earlier on, defines the problem that Eliot is trying to address as "How to love people who have no use". Those whom Eliot tries to assist are life's terminal losers, unhinged by their lack of comprehension of the indifferent system that has produced them. "It is in fact the thoroughly sane for whom Vonnegut reserves his disdain", according to one commentator. Another sums up Vonnegut's intention as to expose "Lust for money by despicable people whose only comic attribute is the glee with which the author has created petty indignities for them to suffer".

Several more of Vonnegut's continuing themes come together, some for the first time, in God Bless You, Mr. Rosewater. The character Eliot Rosewater, the novel's focus, reappears incidentally in Slaughterhouse-Five (1969) and Breakfast of Champions (1973). The description of the fire-bombing of Dresden, which Eliot hallucinates as affecting Indianapolis in chapter 13, remains a master theme in Vonnegut's writing from this point on and is central to Slaughterhouse-Five. Equally a matter of history is the pornographic photograph of a woman attempting sex with a pony, given passing mention in chapter 11 of the novel and reappearing in Slaughterhouse-Five. The celebrated trial of French photographer André Lefèvre for selling just such postcards took place in 1841.

The writer Kilgore Trout, Vonnegut's foil and fictional alter-ego, appears in person for the first time in this novel as taking part in the panel that coaches Eliot back to sanity at the end. There are also summaries of five Trout novels, which are mentioned as part of Eliot's reading. One of these is about aliens from the planet Tralfamadore, which plays a role in many Vonnegut novels. And the name Diana Moon Glampers, one of Eliot's main clients, is that of the Handicapper General in Vonnegut's earlier dystopic story "Harrison Bergeron" (1961), but otherwise she is totally different from the character in God Bless You, Mr. Rosewater.

In chapter 11, the young lawyer Norman Mushari visits the Rumfoord Mansion in Newport and speaks to Lance Rumfoord. Members of that family figure in many other Vonnegut short stories and novels, notably in the earlier The Sirens of Titan (1959). Norman Mushari Jr., the presumed son of Norman Mushari, is found in Vonnegut's later Slapstick (1976) where, in similar fashion, he persuades his client to seek restitution from her family for mistreatment. Both Musharis are motivated by the large cut of the profits to be gained by helping people inherit their wealth.

== Plot ==
The Rosewater Foundation was founded by United States Senator Lister Ames Rosewater of Indiana to help Rosewater descendants avoid paying taxes on the family estate in Rosewater County. It is operated by a large legal firm in New York and provides an annual pension of $3.5 million to Eliot, the senator's son.

Eliot, a World War II veteran, alcoholic, and volunteer firefighter, has developed a social conscience and sets out across America to visit various small towns before he lands in Rosewater County. Eliot does his best to help the people there, having an office in the county seat where he gets phone calls from any of the ineffectual townsfolk needing his help or reassurance, much to the displeasure of his father. Meanwhile, the only other branch of the Rosewater family is a distant cousin named Fred Rosewater living in Rhode Island, a depressed life insurance salesman who contemplates suicide every day. Fred is visited by Norman Mushari, defecting from the Rosewater Corporation's legal team. Mushari persuades Fred that, if he can prove Eliot is insane, he can give him control of the family fortune by causing the money to pass to Fred, Eliot's closest oldest male relative.

After his father advises him of the scheme, Eliot suffers a nervous breakdown and is confined to a mental institution for a year. He suffers a bout of amnesia, recovers and is informed of the present situation, including the fact that he is set to appear the following day in court to defend himself at a proceeding intended to prove his insanity. He also learns that dozens of people from Rosewater are now falsely claiming that Eliot fathered their children. Eliot devises a way out of his predicament: he writes Fred a $100,000 check, and then orders his lawyer to draw up legal papers acknowledging that he is the father of all of his alleged children in Rosewater, thereby creating a county full of heirs with a greater claim on the fortune than Fred. This will foil Mushari's plot and ensure that the Rosewater family fortune will be distributed among the people of the county.

== Etymology and symbolism ==
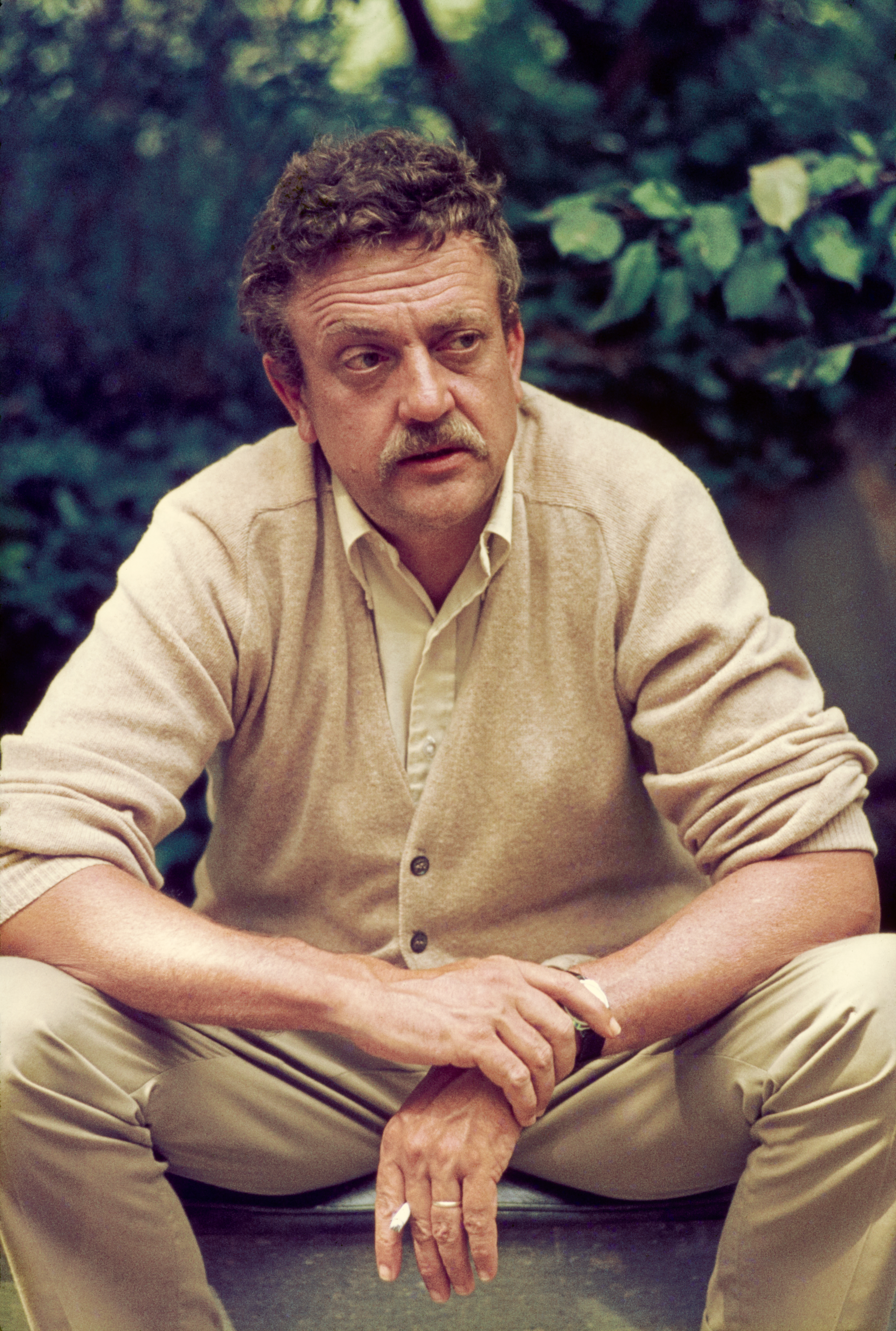
A 1965 photograph of Vonnegut by Bernard Gotfryd

The name Eliot Rosewater suggests a yoking together of opposites. "Eliot" connects the young altruist to T. S. Eliot and his depiction of modern life as a spiritual wasteland devoid of love but surfeited with lust. "Rosewater" can be seen as a combination of the names of the liberal Franklin Delano Roosevelt and the conservative Barry Goldwater. "It becomes apparent that Vonnegut was very much aware of the 1964 US presidential election while writing this novel."

"A Sum of Money is the leading character in this tale about people", and "has a sterilizing effect on everyone it touches in the novel." Money is clearly a dehumanizing force for Vonnegut, as is the class system that begat families like the Rosewaters and the Rockefellers. "The American dream turned belly up, turned green, bobbed to the scummy surface of cupidity unlimited, filled with gas, went bang in the noonday sun", Vonnegut remarks.

== Musical adaptation ==
In 1979, the novel was adapted into a stage musical with a book and lyrics by Howard Ashman, music by Alan Menken, and additional lyrics by Dennis Green. The musical opened at off-Broadway's Entermedia Theatre on October 14, 1979, and ran for 49 performances.

In July 2016, the New York City Centers Encores! Off-Center concert did a revival of the show. The cast album of this revival was released on July 28, 2017, by Ghostlight Records.
