= Breakfast of Champions =

1973 American novel by Kurt Vonnegut

Breakfast of Champions, or Goodbye Blue Monday
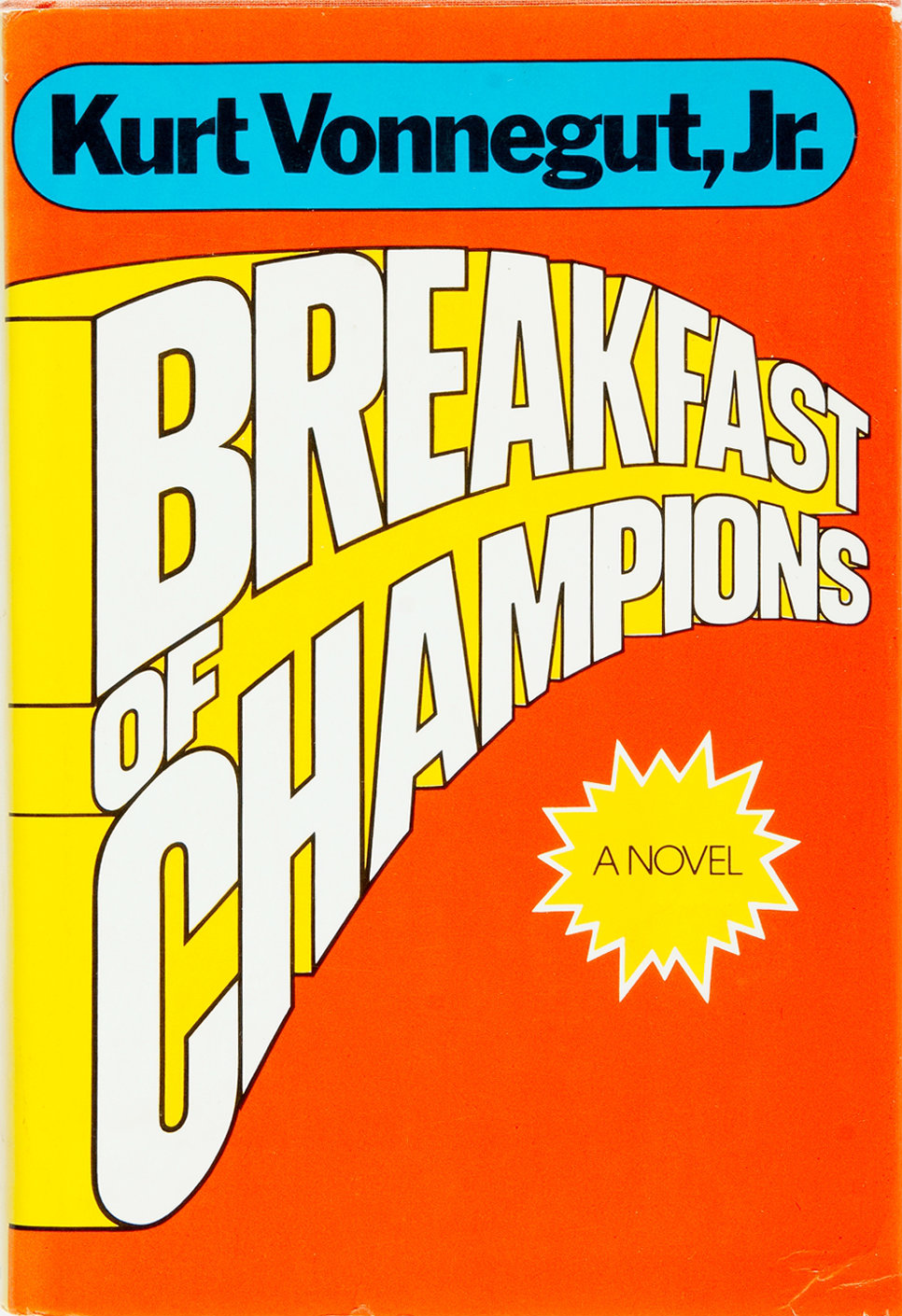
- Cover of first edition (1973)
- Author: Kurt Vonnegut
- Language: English
- Genre: Metafiction; postmodernism; satire
- Publisher: Delacorte Press
- Publication date: 1973
- Publication place: United States
- ISBN: 0-385-28089-0
- OCLC: 524241
- Dewey Decimal: 813.54
- LC Class: PS3572.O5 B7

Breakfast of Champions, or Goodbye Blue Monday is a 1973 novel by the American author Kurt Vonnegut. His seventh novel, it is set predominantly in the fictional town of Midland City, Ohio, and focuses on two characters: Dwayne Hoover, a Midland resident, Pontiac dealer and affluent figure in the city, and Kilgore Trout, a widely published but mostly unknown science fiction author. Breakfast of Champions deals with themes of free will, suicide, and race relations, among others. The novel is full of playful drawings made by the author.

== Plot ==
Breakfast of Champions tells the story of the events that lead up to the chance encounter of Kilgore Trout and Dwayne Hoover, the meeting itself, and the immediate aftermath. Trout is a struggling science fiction writer who, after their fateful meeting, becomes successful and goes on to win a Nobel Prize; Hoover is a wealthy businessman who is going insane, sent over the brink by his encounter with Trout.

Trout, who believes himself to be completely unknown as a writer, answers an invitation to appear at the Midland City arts festival. First he goes to New York City, where he is abducted and beaten up by a group of anonymous, faceless characters who through the media gain the moniker "The Pluto Gang". Trout hitches a ride first with a truck driver, with whom he discusses everything from politics to sex to the destruction of the planet. Then he hops a ride with the only clearly happy character in the book, the driver of a Ford Galaxie who works for himself as a traveling salesman.

Hoover gradually becomes insane as the book progresses. He terrifies his employee at the Pontiac dealership, Harry LeSabre, by criticizing his clothes. LeSabre is afraid Hoover has discovered that he is a closeted transvestite. A recent prison parolee named Wayne Hoobler attempts to find work with Hoover, but is rebuffed. With nowhere else to go, Hoobler hangs around the car lot. Hoover then gets into a fight with his mistress and secretary, Francine Pefko, because he accuses her of asking him to buy her a Kentucky Fried Chicken franchise.

Trout and Hoover meet in the cocktail lounge of the new Holiday Inn, where Hoover's gay estranged son, Bunny, plays the piano. When the bartender turns on the black lights and Trout's white shirt glows brilliantly, Hoover is entranced by it. He accosts Trout and speed-reads his novel, Now It Can Be Told. The premise of the novel is that there is only one creature with free will in the universe (the reader of the novel) and everyone else is a robot. Hoover interprets its message as addressed to him from the Creator of the Universe and goes on a violent rampage, injuring many people around in the belief they are unfeeling robots, including Bunny, Pefko, and Trout. Hoover is eventually institutionalized and winds up a homeless derelict.

In the epilogue, Trout is released from the hospital after Hoover partly bit off his finger in the rampage, and is wandering back to the arts festival, which unbeknownst to him has been canceled. The narrator, who has become an interactive character in the universe of his own creation, watches Trout and then chases him down. He proves that he is the Creator of the Universe by sending Trout all around the world, through time and back. Then he returns to his own universe, presumably, through the "void", while Trout yells after him, "Make me young!"

== Themes ==
Free will, mental illness, and social and economic cruelty are the novel's main themes.

The novel is critical of America's society and treatment of its citizens, many of whom Vonnegut writes "were so ignored and cheated and insulted that they thought they might be in the wrong country." He focuses largely on race, the poor, and the destruction of the environment. He criticizes the hypocrisy of a land that claims to be based on the principles of freedom, since it was founded by people who had "used human beings for machinery, and, even after slavery was eliminated...continued to think of ordinary human beings as machines." The incidents in the life of Wayne Hoobler, a black resident of Midland City, are frequently contrasted with those of the similarly named white man Dwayne Hoover, emphasizing the significance of race in America, a place where "[skin] color was everything".

As in Vonnegut's previous novels The Sirens of Titan (1959) and Slaughterhouse-Five (1969), the text questions the nature of free will. In the preface, Vonnegut states that he tends "to think of human beings as...test tubes...with chemical reactions seething inside" and he applies that idea in Breakfast of Champions. The character Kilgore Trout has written a novel in which humans are portrayed as being mere biological machines, and he gives a copy to Dwayne Hoover. The narrator says "bad chemicals and bad ideas were the Yin and Yang of madness" and that this is the cause of the mental illnesses of Hoover and of society-at-large. Regarding bad ideas and America, the text remarks on how

natural it was for [Americans] to behave so abominably, and with such abominable results: They were doing their best to live like people invented in story books. This was the reason Americans shot each other so often: It was a convenient literary device for ending short stories and books.

Later in the novel, the importance of humans' physical aspect is countered by the character Rabo Karabekian, an abstract artist who says "Our awareness is all that is alive and maybe sacred in any of us. Everything else about us is dead machinery."

== Style ==
The novel is simple in syntax and sentence structure, part of Vonnegut's signature style. Likewise, irony, sentimentality, dark humor, and didacticism are prevalent throughout the work. Like much of his oeuvre, Breakfast of Champions is broken into very small pieces, in this case separated by three dots. Vonnegut himself has claimed that his books "are essentially mosaics made up of a whole bunch of tiny little chips ... and each chip is a joke." Characteristically, he makes heavy use of repetition, in this case starting many sections with "Listen" and ending many with "And so on."

The novel is full of drawings by the author, intending to illustrate various aspects of life on Earth, are sometimes pertinent to the story line and sometimes tangential. They include renderings of an anus, flags, the date 1492, a beaver, a vulva, a flamingo, little girls' underpants, a torch, headstones, the yin-yang symbol, guns, trucks, cows and the hamburgers that are made from them, chickens and the Kentucky Fried Chicken that is made from them, an electric chair, the letters ETC, Christmas cards, a right hand that has a severed ring finger, the chemical structure of a plastic molecule, an apple, pi, zero, infinity, and the sunglasses the author himself wears as he enters the storyline.

Breakfast of Champions makes heavy use of metafiction, with Vonnegut appearing as the narrator/creator of the work, explaining why and how he makes this world as it is, changing things when and as he sees fit, and even being surprised by events.

The novel also makes use of intertextuality with Vonnegut's other works. In addition to Kilgore Trout, characters from other Vonnegut books which appear here include Eliot Rosewater and Rabo Karabekian. Rosewater was the main character in God Bless You, Mr. Rosewater (1965) and a minor character in Slaughterhouse-Five (1969), while Karabekian later became the main character in Bluebeard (1987). Hoover's secretary, Francine Pefko, previously appeared in Cat's Cradle (1963), where she performed secretarial duties at General Forge and Foundry, in Ilium, New York. (Pefko also appears in "Fubar", a story released posthumously in Look at the Birdie.) Vonnegut uses the name "Khashdrahr Miasma" for a minor character, in reference to a character in Player Piano. The vicious guard dog, Kazak, was Winston Niles Rumfoord's pet in The Sirens of Titan (1959) and Selena MacIntosh's guide dog in Galápagos (1985). Many of Midland City's inhabitants reappear in Deadeye Dick (1982), which locates the city in Ohio.

== Background ==
=== Title ===
The title, taken from the well-known slogan for Wheaties breakfast cereal, crops up in a key scene late in the novel when a waitress, apparently ironically, says "Breakfast of Champions" each time she serves a customer a martini. Vonnegut, in his typical ironic manner, mocks the legal and copyright systems as he notes meticulously that Breakfast of Champions is a registered trademark of General Mills, Inc. for its breakfast cereal products, and that his use of the term is not "intended to disparage their fine products."

Vonnegut refers to himself as "Philboyd Studge" in the preface, a name which he claims his friend Knox Burger associated with cumbersome writing. The name appears to have been borrowed from a short story by Edwardian satirist Saki. ("Filboid Studge, the Story of a Mouse That Helped", describes the success of the eponymous breakfast food through bizarrely counter-intuitive advertising.)

=== Doubts about publication ===
According to a January 1971 article in The New York Times Magazine, "Vonnegut says repeatedly he is through writing novels... After Slaughterhouse-Five, Vonnegut began work on a novel called Breakfast of Champions, about a world in which everyone but a single man, the narrator, is a robot. He gave it up, however, and it remains unfinished. I asked him why, and he said, 'Because it was a piece of ----.'" This view persisted, with Harlan Ellison claiming that Vonnegut's submission in the 1972 short-story anthology Again, Dangerous Visions, would be "the last new piece of fiction you will ever read by Kurt Vonnegut, Jr." After the publication of Breakfast of Champions, Vonnegut stopped publishing short stories, and many believed he had given up writing altogether, with The New York Times book review stating

Vonnegut's persona gives up fiction before our very eyes. ... When he self-destructs himself as a novelist by first warning us in the middle of his book that 'Once I understood what was making America such a dangerous, unhappy nation of people who had nothing to do with real life, I resolved to shun story-telling.'

In the preface, Vonnegut states that as he reached his fiftieth birthday he felt a need to "clear his head of all the junk in there"—which includes the various subjects of his drawings, and the characters from his past novels and stories. To this end, he sprinkles plot descriptions for Trout's stories throughout the novel, illustrates the book with his own simple felt-tip pen drawings, and includes a number of characters from his other novels and short stories.

== Reception ==
Breakfast of Champions spent a total of 56 weeks on The New York Times Best Seller list, 28 weeks for the hardcover edition and 28 for the paperback edition. The novel was panned by The New York Times but received positive reviews from Time and Publishers Weekly. Vonnegut himself was unhappy with Breakfast of Champions and gave it a C grade on a report card he made of his published work which was included in his 1981 collection Palm Sunday. However, it remains one of his best-known and most influential works.

== Adaptation ==
In 1999, the novel was made into a film of the same name, starring Bruce Willis, Albert Finney, Nick Nolte and Omar Epps. The movie was widely panned by critics and never went into wide release.
