= Bluebeard (Vonnegut novel) =

1987 novel by Kurt Vonnegut

- Cover of first edition (hardcover)
- Author: Kurt Vonnegut
- Language: English
- Genre: Novel
- Publisher: Delacorte Press
- Publication date: 1987
- Publication place: United States
- Pages: 336 pp
- ISBN: 0-385-29590-1
- OCLC: 15859716
- Dewey Decimal: 813/.54 19
- LC Class: PS3572.O5 B5 1987

Bluebeard, the Autobiography of Rabo Karabekian (1916–1988) is a 1987 novel by American author Kurt Vonnegut. Told in first-person narrative, it describes the later years of fictional Abstract Expressionist painter Rabo Karabekian, who first appeared as a minor character in Vonnegut's Breakfast of Champions (1973). The novel’s circumstances bear a rough resemblance to the fairy tale of Bluebeard, popularized by Charles Perrault, a connection that Karabekian mentions once in the novel.

== Plot summary ==
At the opening of the book, the narrator, Rabo Karabekian, apologizes to the arriving guests: "I promised you an autobiography, but something went wrong in the kitchen..." He describes himself as a museum guard who answers questions from visitors coming to see his priceless collected art. He shares the lonely home with his live-in cook and her daughter, Celeste.

One afternoon, Circe Berman, a woman living nearby, wanders onto Karabekian's private beach. When he reaches out to greet her, she catches him by surprise with the forward statement "Tell me how your parents died." He tells her the story and proceeds to invite her back to his home for a drink. After a drink and supper, Karabekian invites her to stay with him, as Paul Slazinger, a friend of Karabekian does. After a time, he begins to find her charm "manipulative", as she typically gets her way. Mrs. Berman does not respect his abstract art collection, including works by Jackson Pollock. She explores every inch of Karabekian's home, constantly asking him questions. The only place that is off-limits to her is the potato barn.

The potato barn is the home of Karabekian's studio and holds his "secret". The barn has no windows, and Karabekian has gone through the trouble of nailing one end shut and immobilizing the other with six padlocks. The mystery of the potato barn has enticed collectors to make outrageous offers and to raise suspicions of stolen masterpieces. Upon help from Berman, Karabekian comes to a realization in his life, that he was merely afraid of people, and opens the painting in the potato barn to the public.

== Characters ==
- Rabo Karabekian — Karabekian is a 71-year-old, one-eyed, first-generation Armenian-American painter. He lives in a 19-room house on the waterfront of East Hampton, Long Island, which he has inherited from his second wife Edith.
- Circe Berman - Circe selects Rabo's home as a place to research and write about working-class adolescents living with multi-millionaires. While living there she more or less takes charge of Rabo's life and tells him to start writing an autobiography, which he does. After she impulsively renovates Rabo's foyer without his permission—removing many of the things Rabo's dead wife had used to decorate it in doing so—the two get into a heated argument which results in her departure, although she soon returns and is accepted back. This is the most notable example of Circe's disregard for other people's privacy and personal space. Although Rabo does most of the things she wants him to, he will not tell her what is in the potato barn no matter how much she pressures him to do so. She is a well-published novelist under the pen name "Polly Madison." Her novels, although very popular, are criticized for tainting the world's youth.
- Paul Slazinger - Slazinger is a poor, wounded World War II veteran. Though he owns his own home, he stays with Rabo and eats from his kitchen. He refuses permanent residence on the grounds that "he can only write at home". He has had eleven novels published, but is not in the league of Circe Berman. Circe is pretending not to be Polly Madison, so Paul looks down on her and condescendingly gives her writing advice.
- Dan Gregory - Originally named Dan Gregorian before moving to America and changing his name. A magazine article estimates him to be the highest-paid artist in American history. That he is Armenian like Rabo's family causes Rabo's mother to believe he is a great man, an example of an Armenian who has become a success in America. She insists that her son write to "Gregorian", as she calls him, to ask for an apprenticeship. Rabo became "Gregorian's" apprentice at the age of 17. He is extremely pro-fascist and is obsessed with Benito Mussolini, whom he greatly admires. His high opinion of Mussolini results in him getting into arguments with such men as W.C. Fields and Al Jolson, who subsequently refuse to associate with him. He eventually goes to Italy to work directly for Mussolini during the Second World War. He is accepted by Mussolini, who welcomes the public support of such a famous artist, but is finally killed in battle by British troops.
- Marilee Kemp - Marilee is Dan Gregory's mistress, who persuades Gregory to take Rabo as his apprentice. She eventually becomes Rabo's love interest and later the two of them are expelled from Gregory's studio when he catches them leaving the Museum of Modern Art together. They have a very brief affair which Marilee ends, claiming that Rabo is not the man she needed at the time. Through a series of events she becomes a rich countess in Italy.
- Edith Taft - Edith is Rabo's second wife of twenty years.
- Dorothy Roy - Dorothy is Rabo's first wife. She has left with their two boys, Terry and Henri.
- Rabo's Parents - Rabo's parents are survivors of the Armenian genocide who are then tricked by a con man into buying a fake deed for a house in San Ignacio, California, where they move in order to create a better life. His father, having been a teacher in Turkey, ends up becoming a cobbler when they reach their new home. When the Great Depression hits the family falls on very hard times.
- Allison White - She is Rabo's live-in cook, though he never refers to her as anything besides that until she becomes upset with him for never using her name. She has a daughter, Celeste, who also lives with them.

== Major themes ==
A number of critics have suggested that the possibility of creating art with meaning is a major theme in Bluebeard. According to David Rampton in "Studies in Contemporary Fiction," Circe Berman's approaching Rabo with the challenge of making meaningful, moral art is Vonnegut himself directly addressing meaninglessness in art by asking for "committed art." Rampton also proposed that Vonnegut may be questioning the possibility of truly moral art by writing about the lack of morality in the lives of many artists. Critics have also said that meaningful art is Karabekian's way of battling his own demons. Donald Morse said that Karabekian's accomplishment in the novel is realising that "through self-acceptance, and the serious use of imagination and creativity, human beings can become reconciled to their weaknesses while still remaining outraged at human greed." Morse added that Karabekian's final masterpiece, "Now It's the Women's Turn," achieves the goal of meaningful art by developing a backstory for each of the 5,219 characters in the composition before painting it.

Other themes that critics have discussed are Survivor's syndrome, family, and relationships with women. One critic wrote that Rabo escapes the Survivor's syndrome that his parents suffered from by painting "Now It's the Women's Turn." It has also been said that Karabekian's mission in the narrative is to find a family that he feels a part of, which he achieves with the army and the Abstract Expressionism community. Lastly, women are certainly a theme in Bluebeard. New York Times reviewer Julian Moynahan said that Circe Berman sees Karabekian's main life struggle as strained relationships with women.

== Literary significance and reception ==
Bluebeard received positive reviews from many critics. Some considered the novel a milestone in Vonnegut's career; Philadelphia Inquirer called it "Vonnegut at his edifying best," and the Chicago Tribune said it was "a major breakthrough for Vonnegut," and "a new and vital phase in his career." Newsday said it was "worth reading twice," and Atlanta Journal & Constitution wrote that "Bluebeard ranks with [Vonnegut's] best and goes one step beyond."

Bluebeard was also met with significantly negative reception. Julian Moynahan wrote in a New York Times book review that Bluebeard was a "minor achievement" and that Vonnegut "isn't moving ahead." In Library Journal, the novel is identified as "not among [Vonnegut's] best."

== Style ==
There were several unique aspects of the style in which Vonnegut wrote Bluebeard. Donald Morse identified a difference between Bluebeard and other Vonnegut's novels, which was that the protagonist was happy and satisfied at the end of the narrative. Morse also said that Karabekian as a writer is very similar to Vonnegut as a writer, and that the criticism Circe Berman gives to Karabekian about his writing is a parallel to the issues critics have with Vonnegut's writing.

== Paintings ==
In the novel, several of Karabekian's paintings are described in detail. The first is a photo-realistic painting of Dan Gregory's studio. The second is an abstract painting of a lost Arctic explorer and a charging polar bear. It consists of a white background with two strips of tape, one white, one orange. The third painting is of six deer and a hunter, titled "Hungarian Rhapsody Number Six" which later fell apart in storage at the Guggenheim Museum. The scene is represented by a greenish-orange background with six strips of brown tape for the deer on one side, and one strip of red tape on the opposite side for the hunter. His most famous, which once hung in the lobby of GEFFCo headquarters on Park Avenue, is titled "Windsor Blue Number Seventeen." The entire painting consisting of eight 8×8 panels hung side by side displays nothing but the paint by Sateen Dura-Luxe in the shade of the title of the work. However, the painting literally fell apart when the Sateen Dura-Luxe began to shred itself from the canvas upon which it was painted becoming Rabo Karabekian's biggest embarrassment as an abstract expressionist. These very panels upon which Windsor Blue used to cover fully became the canvases Karabekian would prime back to pure white and use for his last work locked within his potato barn.

The last painting is the secret in the potato barn. The painting is an enormous photo-realistic picture of Karabekian's experience of World War II where he and 5,219 other prisoners of war, Romani people, and concentration camp victims were dumped in a valley when the German forces realized that the war was lost. The painting, which has become a successful tourist attraction, is meant to be the only painting that Karabekian created which contained "soul".
