= Eliot Rosewater =

Character in the novels of Kurt Vonnegut

- Created by: Kurt Vonnegut

In-universe information
- Species: Human
- Gender: Male
- Nationality: American

Eliot Rosewater is a recurring character in the novels of American author Kurt Vonnegut. He appears throughout various novels as an alcoholic, and a philanthropist who claims to be a volunteer fireman. He runs the Rosewater Foundation, an organization created to keep the family's money in the family. He is among the few fans of the novels of Kilgore Trout (another of Vonnegut's creations).

== God Bless You, Mr. Rosewater ==
God Bless You, Mr. Rosewater, or, Pearls Before Swine, the first of Vonnegut's novels to feature the character of Eliot Rosewater, is also the one in which he is the most prominent.

The 1965 novel follows much of his life as the liberal son of a rich, conservative Senator from Rosewater County, Indiana who founded the Rosewater Foundation. Eliot Rosewater is convinced that he should spend the family riches to help the poor and uses the Foundation to this end, an idea looked down upon by his father. Norman Mushari, an opportunistic former associate of the Rosewater family lawyer, attempts to have Eliot declared insane so that the family wealth can be inherited by his new client, a distant relative to the east. This and other crises lead to a year-long mental blackout, after which Rosewater's favorite writer, Kilgore Trout, tries to explain to the Senator that Eliot's actions were sane and compassionate.

The New York Times called it "[Vonnegut] at his wildest best" and Conrad Aiken said that it's "a brilliantly funny satire on almost everything".

== Slaughterhouse-Five ==
Slaughterhouse-Five, or The Children's Crusade, first published in 1969, features Eliot Rosewater in Chapter Five. Billy Pilgrim, the main character of the novel, has committed himself to a psychiatric hospital during his last year of optometry school, and finds himself sharing a room with Eliot Rosewater. Eliot introduces Billy Pilgrim to the works of Kilgore Trout, which set the foundation for Billy's adventures through time and with the Tralfamadorians, aliens that Billy claims abducted him.

== Film appearances ==
- Slaughterhouse-Five (1971), played by Henry Bumstead
- Breakfast of Champions (1999), played by Ken Hudson Campbell

== Appearances in Vonnegut's novels ==
- God Bless You, Mr. Rosewater (1965)
- Slaughterhouse-Five (1969)
- Breakfast of Champions (1973)
- Hocus Pocus (1990)

== Namesake award ==
The Eliot Rosewater Indiana High School Book Award (often shortened to Rosie Award) is given to one young adult book each year as selected by Indiana high school students.
