= Deadeye Dick =

1982 novel by Kurt Vonnegut

- Cover of first edition (hardcover)
- Author: Kurt Vonnegut
- Language: English
- Genre: Novel
- Publisher: Delacorte Press
- Publication date: 1982
- Publication place: United States
- Media type: Print (hardback & paperback)
- ISBN: 0-440-01780-7
- OCLC: 8629582
- Dewey Decimal: 813/.54 19
- LC Class: PS3572.O5 D4 1982

Deadeye Dick is a novel by Kurt Vonnegut originally published in 1982.

== Plot summary ==
The novel's main character, Rudy Waltz, or "Deadeye Dick" as he is nicknamed in his hometown, commits accidental manslaughter as a child when he shoots a gun out of a window and fatally strikes a pregnant woman. His father, a failed artist who lived in Austria as a young man and was friends with Adolf Hitler before his rise to power, takes responsibility for the accident because he gave Rudy access to his firearm collection. He and Rudy's mother lose their wealth in a lawsuit to the victim's husband and must fire their servants, after which Rudy becomes their cook and housekeeper. Rudy has no social life and as an adult identifies as a non-sexual "neuter."

In the present, Rudy is a middle-aged expatriate hotel manager in Haiti, which according to the book's preface symbolizes New York City. After he and his brother Felix, the former president of NBC, moved there, a neutron bomb killed everyone in their hometown, the generic Midwestern town of Midland City, Ohio, which is also the setting of Vonnegut's novel Breakfast of Champions. The book ends with the two visiting the now-empty city.

== Place in the Vonnegut universe ==
Deadeye Dick is set mostly within fictional Midland City, Ohio, which is also the setting for one of Vonnegut's other seminal works, Breakfast of Champions. Several characters, locations, or concepts from that novel are mentioned in passing or have an active role in the story (e.g. Rabo Karabekian, Dwayne and Celia Hoover, the Mildred Barry Memorial Center for the Arts, and Barrytron Ltd., amongst others).

== Reception ==
Dave Langford reviewed Deadeye Dick for White Dwarf #56, and stated that "The Vonnegut idiom of brief, flip, casual paragraphs lets him sneak through some shrewd blows under the lighthearted camouflage, but though often moving the technique sometimes rings hollow [...] Read the book, but warily."

== Reviews ==
- Review by Loree Rackstraw (1990) in Critical Essays on Kurt Vonnegut
