= Bernard Gotfryd =

Polish-American photographer (1924–2016)

- Gotfryd, c. 1968
- Born: May 25, 1924; Radom, Poland
- Died: June 3, 2016 (aged 92); New York City, U.S.
- Occupation: Photographer

Bernard Gotfryd (May 25, 1924 – June 3, 2016) was a Polish-born American photographer, primarily associated with Newsweek, for which he photographed celebrities, politicians, artists, and writers.

== Early life ==
Born into a Jewish family in Radom, Gotfryd was 15 at the time of the German invasion of Poland in 1939. He watched his mother taken away, eventually to die in a concentration camp, and his grandmother's remains roll past in a pile of Jewish bodies on a cart. He spent most of the war working at a photo laboratory that developed pictures taken by German officers, some of which he smuggled to members of the Polish resistance. He was eventually captured, and spent the final period of the war as a slave laborer in the quarries of the Gusen concentration camp at Mauthausen. He reunited with his brother, whom he initially failed to recognize, and sister after the war. Several years later, in 1947, he emigrated to the United States, where he married a fellow survivor from Radom, in March 1952. He was drafted into the United States Army Signal Corps in 1949, where he was trained as a combat photographer.

== Career ==
Following his army service, Gotfryd was hired as a photographer by Newsweek. Though many of his assignments consisted of photographing movie stars and newsmakers wherever he could find them, his distinctive perspective was more apparent when he had more time. Assigned to photograph the controversial novelist William Styron, as Styron's daughter Alexandra later remembered, Gotfryd went beyond the assignment to capture the "cultural dissonance" of family life at Styron's home with "subtle candor." In some cases he developed personal relationships with his famous subjects. Sent by Newsweek to shoot Nina Simone, he eventually became a close friend; Simone introduced him to James Baldwin as "the best photographer in the world." A print of Gotfryd's photograph of Simone and Baldwin is now housed at the Smithsonian National Museum of African American History and Culture.

== Late writing ==
Inspired by a 1983 visit to Poland, his first since his emigration, and his mother's exhortation the last day he saw her to "tell the world what the Nazis were doing," Gotfryd began writing brief stories of his memories of his childhood and the Holocaust. These stories were eventually published as Anton, the Dove-Fancier: And Other Tales of the Holocaust in 1990. A selection of his photographs, with the title The Intimate Eye, was published in 2006. Upon his death, his photographs, which he willed to the public, were donated to the Library of Congress.

== Gallery ==
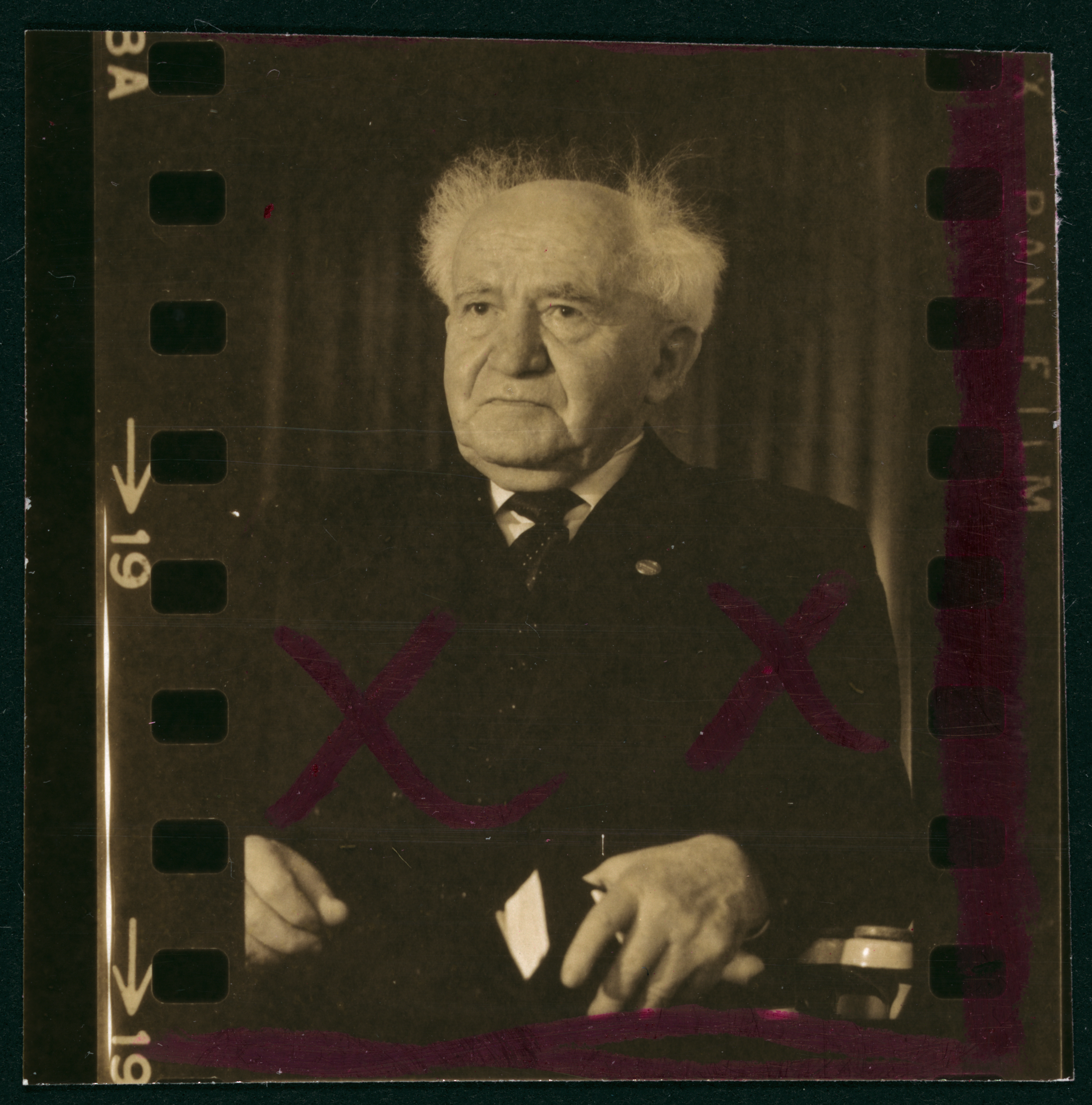
David Ben-Gurion

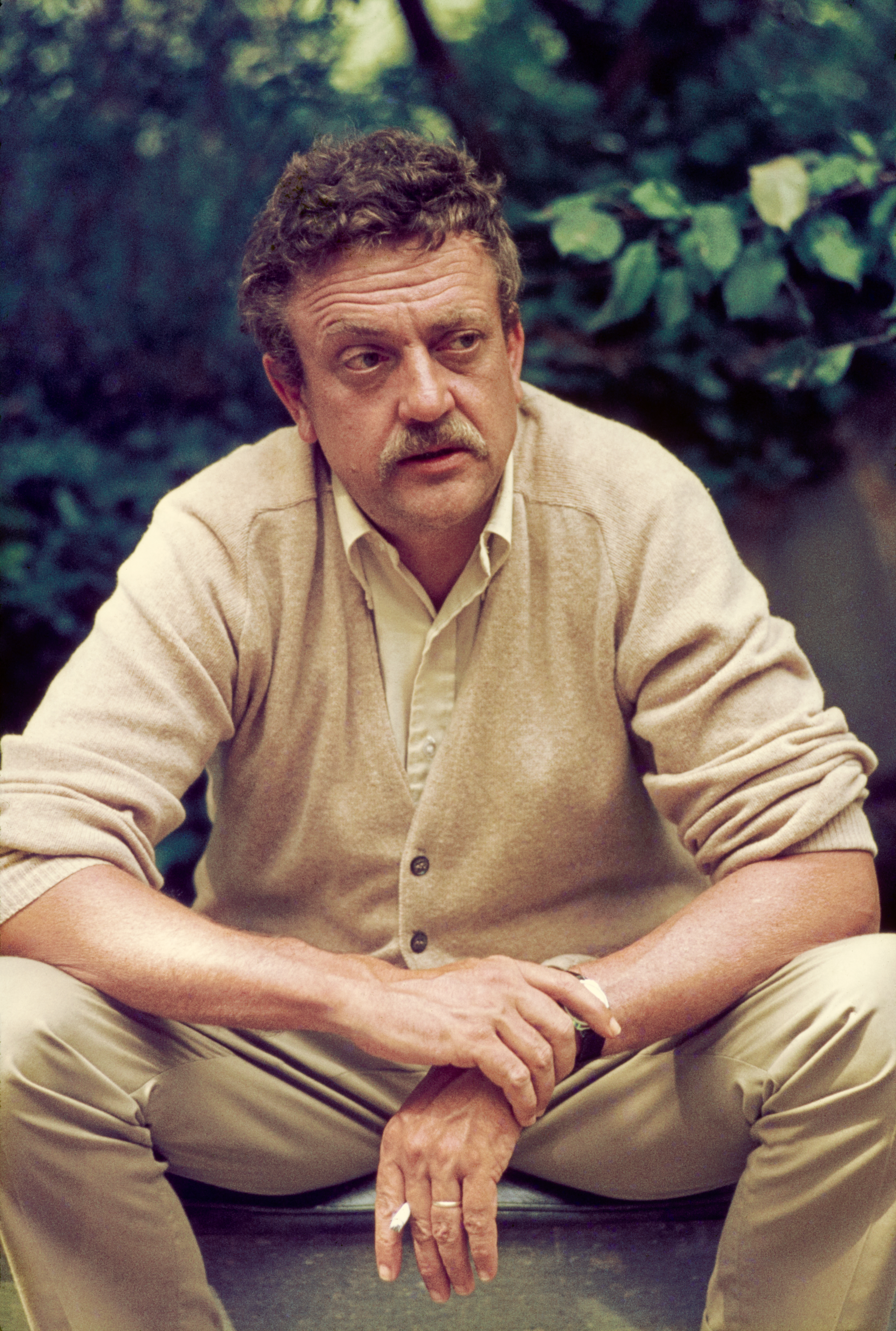
Kurt Vonnegut

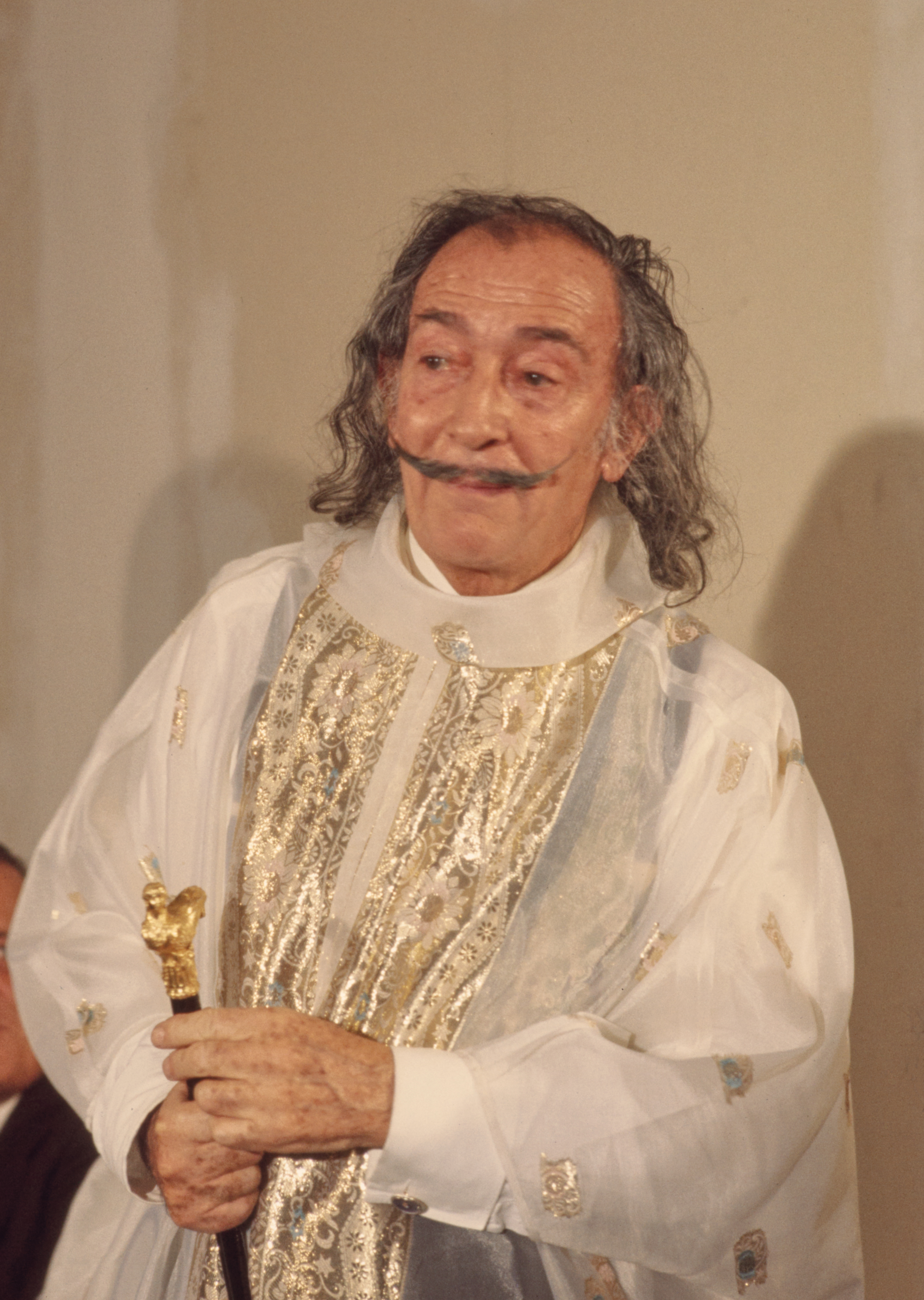
Salvador Dalí

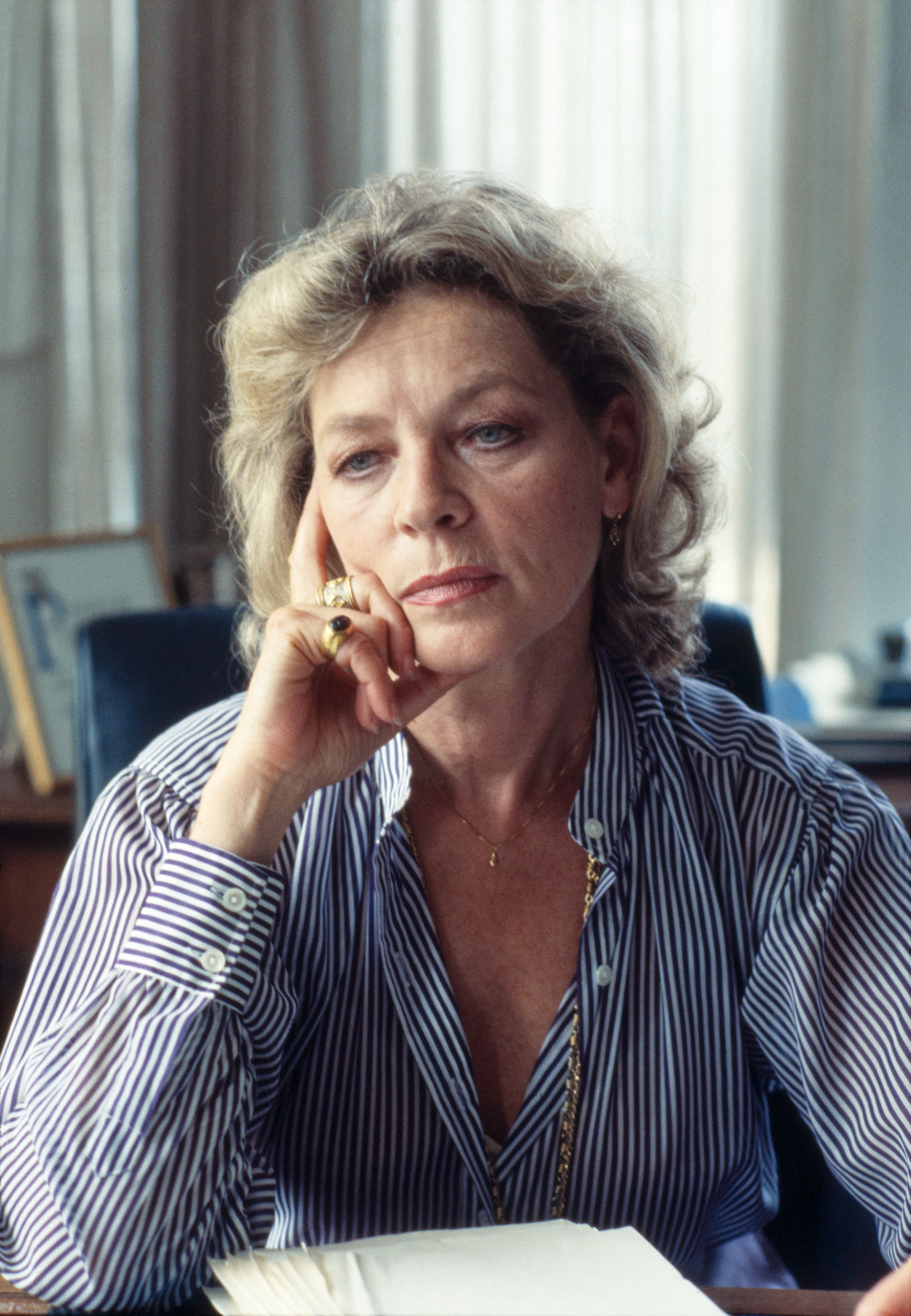
Lauren Bacall

Steve Jobs

Catherine Deneuve

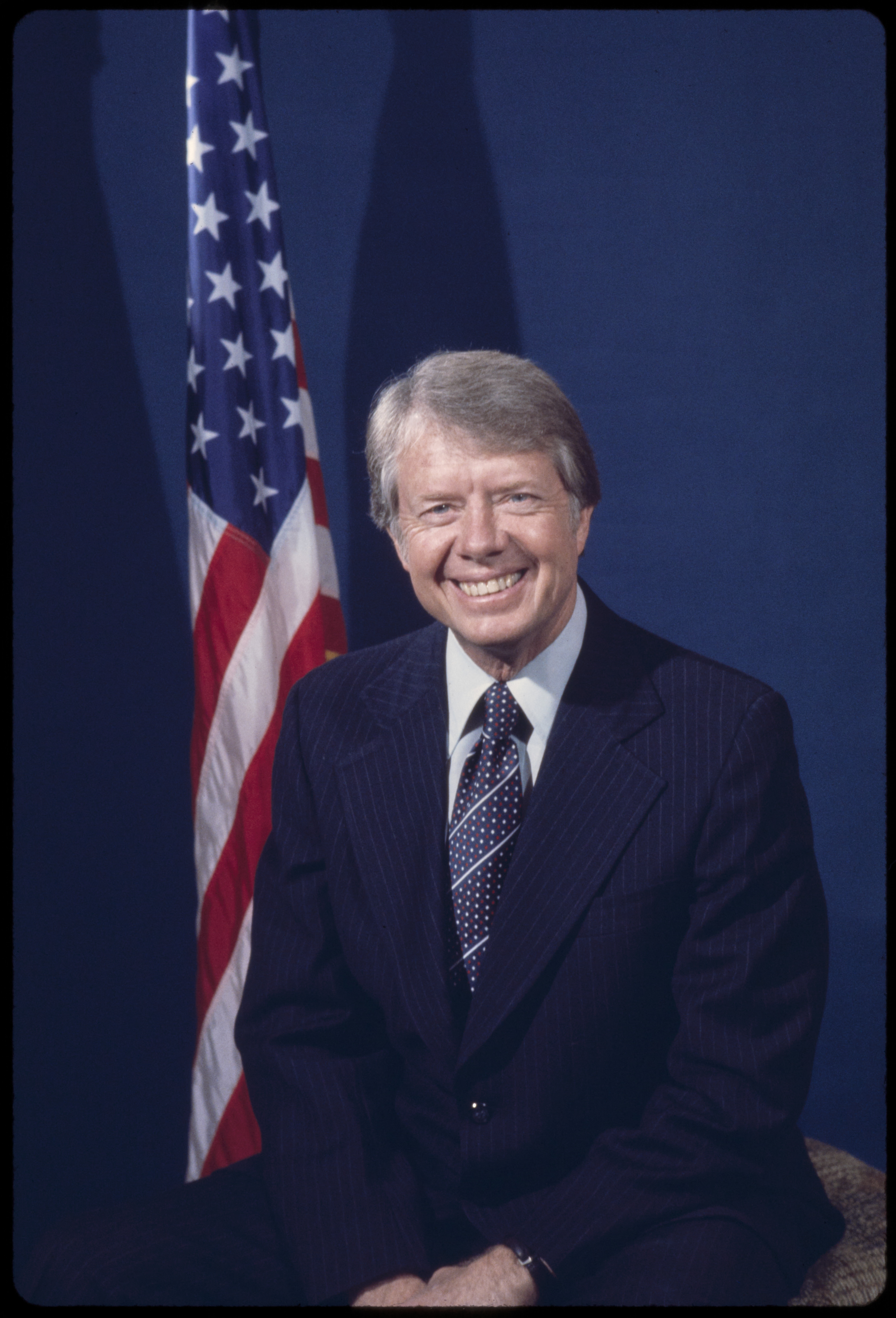
Jimmy Carter
